= Susanna Zerbini =

Italian geodesist

Susanna Zerbini (born 1948) is an Italian geophysicist, geodesist, and geodynamicist. She is known as a pioneer in developing and applying satellite geodesy for research in geodynamics and Earth system sciences.

== Education and career ==
Zerbini completed classical secondary school education (including Latin and Greek) and then decided to become a scientist. In 1972 she graduated from the University of Bologna with a Ph.D. (Laurea) in physics. From 1973 to 1981 she was supported by fellowships from the Consiglio Nazionale delle Ricerche (Italian National Council of Research) and Zonta International. From 1975 to 1976 and again from 1978 to 1979 she held appointments as a visiting scientist in geoastronomy at the Harvard-Smithsonian Center for Astrophysics. At the University of Bologna, she was from 1981 to 1987 a research associate, from 1987 to 2011 an associate professor of geodesy, and from 2011 to 2018 a full professor in the department of physics. In 2018 she retired as professor emerita.

Zerbini played a key role in explaining anomalous orbital effects for PAGEOS (PAssive Geodetic Earth Orbiting Satellite) — a balloon satellite was launched by NASA in June 1966. PAGEOS was important in research on direct solar radiation and terrestrial albedo radiation. She identified the flux of micrometeoroids in the near-Earth environment as the cause of unexpected oblateness and precession of PAGEOS. She developed models for precise computations of the orbits of LAGEOS-1 and LAGEOS-2. Her research was important for using the LAGEOS data for precisely determining Earth's crustal motion, especially for the Mediterranean region and the San Andreas Fault. She was the leader for Italy's science participation in the LAGEOS-2 mission jointly sponsored by the USA (via NASA) and by Italy.

Beginning in the 1990s, much of Zerbini's research has focused on studies of changes in sea levels. She was one of the main organizers of the European Union project SEa Level Fluctuations (SELF), consisting of two parts: SELF-1 and SELF-2, designed to study sea-level variations of the Mediterranean Sea and the Black Sea. In the SELF project from 1993 to 1998, scientists from Spain, France, Italy, Greece, Bulgaria, and Russia used GPS techniques to measure sea-level variations to an accuracy of a few millimeters per year. The SELF scientists made use of tide gauges, satellite-oriented reference and intermediate stations, and water vapor radiometers (WVRs). The basic aim of SELF-1 and SELF-2 was the synchronization by GPS of a large, coordinated ensemble of tide gauges surrounding the Mediterranean Sea and the Black Sea – thus allowing, in data analysis, the separation of sea-level changes from tectonic movements. In the first decade of the 21st century, she and her colleagues used GPS and large, coordinated ensembles of superconducting gravimeters to study changes in Earth's mascons for the purpose of better understanding of tectonic movements.

In more recent years, she has done research on sea-level changes by rescuing and analyzing data from tide gauge data dating back to 1873. For better understanding of climate change, she and her colleagues compare tide gauge data with long-period time series of GPS heights and gravity data acquired at the radio observatory in Medicina.

Zerbini has served on numerous scientific committees, panels, and advisory boards. She was from 2007 to 2008 a member of the Board of Administrators of the Italian Space Agency (ASI), from 2008 to 2010 a member of the Waldo E. Smith Medal Committee of the American Geophysical Union (AGU), and from 2009 to 2011 the chair of the Vening Meinesz Medal Committee of the European Geosciences Union (EGU). She was from 1992 to 1996 an associated editor for geodesy in the AGU's Journal of Geophysical Research-Solid Earth. For Elsevier's Journal of Geodynamics, she was from 1996 to 2002 an associate editor and is since 2002 a member of the journal's editorial board.

Zerbini was elected in 1999 a Fellow of the International Association of Geodesy (IAG). In 2001 she was awarded the "Gold Badge" of the European Geophysical Society (EGS), which was merged in 2002 into the European Geosciences Union (EGU). In 2009 she was awarded the EGU's Vening Meinesz Medal.

== Selected publications ==
=== Articles ===
- Bilham, Roger; Zerbini, Susanna (1989). "Space geodesy and the global forecast of earthquakes". Eos, Transactions American Geophysical Union. 70 (5): 65–73. Bibcode:1989EOSTr..70...65B. doi:10.1029/89EO00038.
- Zerbini, S. (October 1991). "Earth physics: State-of-the-art and main issues". Report of the Earth Observation User Consultation Meeting (SEE N92-22826 13-42). European Space Agency (ESA). pp. 220–225. Bibcode:1991eouc.rept..220Z.
- Anderson, Allen Joel; Klingele, E.; Sabadini, R.; Tinti, S.; Zerbini, Suzanna (December 1991). "The geophysical impact of the Aristoteles mission". The Solid-Earth Mission Aristoteles (SEE N92-23910 14-12). European Space Agency (ESA). pp. 45–50. Bibcode:1991ssma.rept...45A.
- Zerbini, Susanna; Plag, Hans-Peter; Baker, Trevor; Becker, Matthias; Billiris, Harris; Bürki, Beat; Kahle, Hans-Gert; Marson, Iginio; Pezzoli, Laura; Richter, Bernd; Romagnoli, Claudia; Sztobryn, Marzenna; Tomasi, Paolo; Tsimplis, Michael; Veis, George; Verrone, Grazia (1996). "Sea level in the Mediterranean: A first step towards separating crustal movements and absolute sea-level variations". Global and Planetary Change. 14 (1–2): 1–48. Bibcode:1996GPC....14....1Z. doi:10.1016/0921-8181(96)00003-3.
- Zerbini, S.; Baker, T.; Negusini, M.; Plag, H.-P.; Romagnoli, C. (1998). "Height variations and secular changes in sea level". Journal of Geodynamics. 25 (3–4): 241–262. Bibcode:1998JGeo...25..241Z. doi:10.1016/S0264-3707(97)00038-0.
- Zerbini, S.; Negusini, M.; Romagnoli, C.; Domenichini, F.; Richter, B.; Simon, D. (2002). "Multi-parameter continuous observations to detect ground deformation and to study environmental variability impacts". Global and Planetary Change. 34 (1–2): 37–58. Bibcode:2002GPC....34...37Z. doi:10.1016/S0921-8181(02)00105-4.
- Wöppelmann, Guy; Zerbini, Susanna; Marcos, Marta (2006). "Tide gauges and Geodesy: A secular synergy illustrated by three present-day case studies". Comptes Rendus Geoscience. 338 (14–15): 980–991. Bibcode:2006CRGeo.338..980W. doi:10.1016/j.crte.2006.07.006.
- Zerbini, Susanna; Richter, Bernd; Rocca, Fabio; Van Dam, Tonie; Matonti, Francesco (2007). "A Combination of Space and Terrestrial Geodetic Techniques to Monitor Land Subsidence: Case Study, the Southeastern Po Plain, Italy". Journal of Geophysical Research: Solid Earth. 112 (B5) 2006JB004338. Bibcode:2007JGRB..112.5401Z. doi:10.1029/2006JB004338.
- Zerbini, S.; Raicich, F.; Richter, B.; Gorini, V.; Errico, M. (2010). "Hydrological signals in height and gravity in northeastern Italy inferred from principal components analysis". Journal of Geodynamics. 49 (3–4): 190–204. Bibcode:2010JGeo...49..190Z. doi:10.1016/j.jog.2009.11.001. S2CID 140189580.
- Zerbini, Susanna; Raicich, Fabio; Errico, Maddalena; Cappello, Giovanni (2013). "An EOF and SVD analysis of interannual variability of GPS coordinates, environmental parameters and space gravity data". Journal of Geodynamics. 67: 111–124. Bibcode:2013JGeo...67..111Z. doi:10.1016/j.jog.2012.04.006.
- Zerbini, Susanna; Bruni, Sara; Errico, Maddalena; Santi, Efisio (2015). "Space geodetic activities, from the early days to present, with focus on the northeastern Adriatic". Rendiconti Lincei. 26: 43–51. doi:10.1007/s12210-015-0399-0. S2CID 140163854.
- Zerbini, Susanna; Bruni, Sara; Errico, Maddalena; Santi, Efisio (2018). "Observing the earth at regional and local scale by means of space geodetic techniques". Rendiconti Lincei. Scienze Fisiche e Naturali. 29: 41–49. Bibcode:2018RLSFN..29...41Z. doi:10.1007/s12210-017-0638-7. S2CID 134288088.

=== Books ===
- Baldi, Paolo; Zerbini, Susanna, eds. (1988). Proceedings on the Third International Conference on WEGENER/MEDLAS Project: Bologna, May 25, 26, 27, 1987. Vol. 3. University of Bologna. Bologna: Esculapio Editore. ISBN 8885040071. OL 17697461M.
- Mueller, Ivan I.; Zerbini, Susanna, eds. (1989). The Interdisciplinary Role of Space Geodesy: Proceedings of an international workshop held at "Ettore Majorana" Center for Scientific Culture, International School of Geodesy, Director, Enzo Boschi, Erice, Sicily, Italy, July 23-29, 1988. Lecture Notes in Earth Sciences. Vol. 22. Springer. ISBN 3-540-51161-X. LCCN 89011266. ebook edition
- Smith, David E.; Raper, Sarah B.; Zerbini, Susanna; et al., eds. Sea level change and coastal processes. Implications for Europe. Office for Official Publications of the European Communities. 2000. ISBN 9789282890233.
