= List of passive satellites =

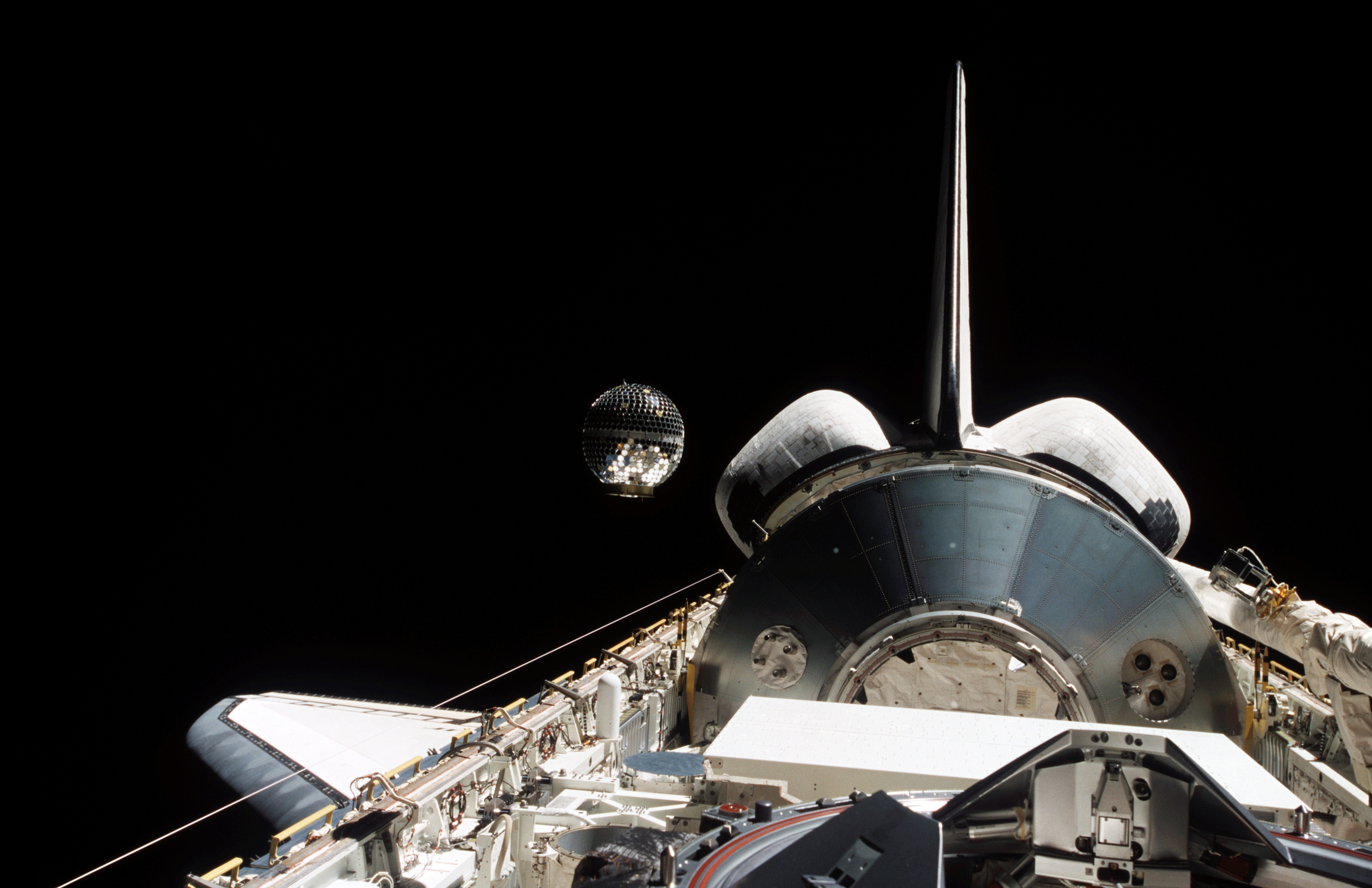
STARSHINE deployed from Endeavour during STS-108 in 2001.

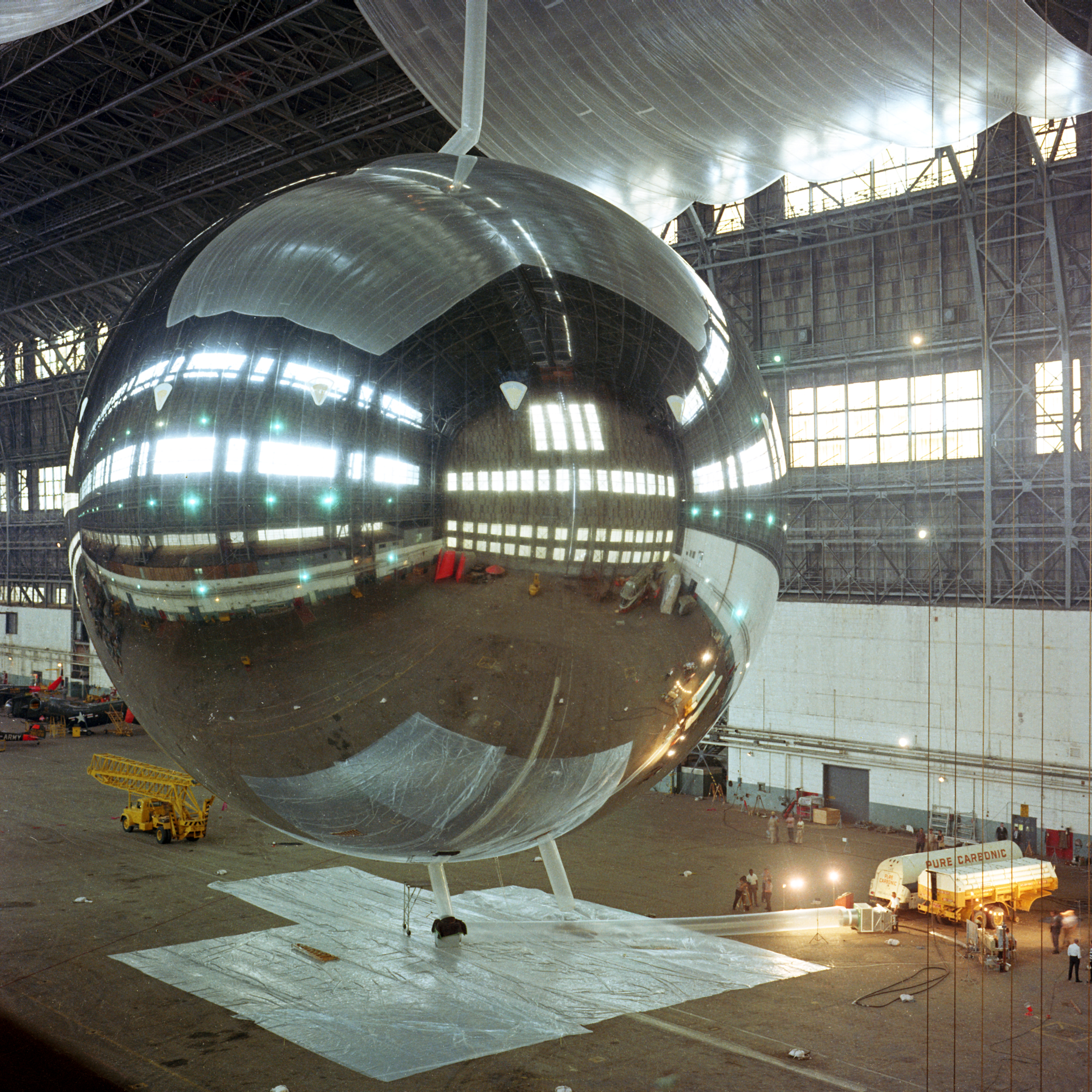
PAGEOS test

This is a listing of passive satellites – inert or mostly inert satellites, mainly of the Earth. This includes various reflector type satellites typically used for geodesy and atmospheric measurements.

== Passive satellites ==
- Calsphere
  - Calsphere 1A
  - Calsphere 2
  - Calsphere 3
  - Calsphere 4
  - Calsphere 4A
  - Calsphere 5
- Dragsphere 1
- Dragsphere 2
- Enoch
- Explorer 9
- GFZ-1
- Humanity Star
- LCS-1
- PAGEOS
- PAMS-STU, see STS-77
- POPACS
- Reflector
- PasComSat
- Rigid Sphere 1 (AVL-802H)
- Rigid Sphere 2
- Sfera

=== Dedicated laser ranging satellites ===
Several dedicated laser ranging satellites were put in orbit:

- Ajisai (Experimental Geodetic Payload)
- BLITS
- Calsphere satellites
- Etalon
  - Kosmos 1989
  - Kosmos 2024
- LAGEOS
  - LAGEOS 1
  - LAGEOS 2, see STS-52
- LARES
  - LARES 1
  - LARES 2
- Larets
- STARSHINE
  - Starshine 1, see STS-96
  - Starshine 2, see STS-108
- Starlette and Stella

== Mostly passive satellites ==
- Echo project
  - Echo 1 (Echo 1A)
  - Echo 2
- Elon Musk's Tesla Roadster
- Starshine 3
- Hayabusa2
  - Deployable camera 3 (DCAM3)
  - Small Carry-On Impactor (SCI)
  - Target Marker B
  - Target Marker A
  - Target Marker E (Explorer)
  - Target Marker C (Sputnik/Спутник)
- IKAROS
  - Deployable camera 1 (DCAM1)
  - Deployable camera 2 (DCAM2)
- SpaceTuna1
- Tianwen-1
  - Tianwen-1 Deployable Camera 1
  - Tianwen-1 Remote Camera
  - Tianwen-1 Deployable Camera 2

== See also ==
- List of laser ranging satellites
- Lunar Laser Ranging experiment
- Balloon satellites
- Satellite geodesy
