= Ivan I. Mueller =

Ivan Istvan Mueller (9 January 1930, Budapest – 12 April 2023, Bloomfield, Connecticut) was a Hungarian-American geodesist and professor at Ohio State University, a leading training center for geodesy in the USA.

== Biography ==
Ivan I. Mueller and his wife Marianne were married in 1950. He graduated from the Technical University of Budapest (now renamed the Budapest University of Technology and Economics). He, with his family, left Hungary immediately after the Hungarian Revolution of 1956. He graduated from Ohio State University's Department of Geodetic Science and Surveying in 1960 with a Ph.D. in geodesy. His Ph.D. thesis is entitled The gradients of gravity and their applications in geodesy. Upon the recommendation of his thesis advisor, Veikko Heiskanen, Mueller was appointed to a faculty position at Ohio State University and continued there until his retirement in 1992 as professor emeritus and department chair emeritus.

Mueller shaped satellite geodesy from its beginnings and, in particular, designed several projects for intercontinental networks of satellite triangulation. One such project (1973/74) involved the use of Doppler instrumentation aboard satellites and is considered groundbreaking. The project's innovations were combined with the Worldwide Geometric Satellite Triangulation Program, with Hellmut Schmid as technical director, to produce the most accurate coordinate determination to date across all seas and achieved a standard deviation of approximately ±3 m, which was about 20 times more accurate than the terrestrial methods, which at the time required extremely lengthy measurements over island chains.

Another among Mueller's many ideas and projects involved Satellite Laser Ranging (SLR) to investigate the geodynamics of California. Mueller proposed that for geodynamics and geodesy, instead of recording laser-distance measurements solely from numerous ground stations using signal-relaying satellites, a considerable improvement would be to integrate the ground stations with the development of an active laser-carrying satellite system with time-of-flight measurement on board. This could result in significant improvements in measurements in terms of speed and accuracy. The idea had some problems with technical feasibility, but was adopted in a similar form around 1990 for the French DORIS Doppler measurement system.

At Ohio State University, Mueller was the thesis advisor for 25 doctoral students. He was the author or coauthor of 5 books and more than 220 scientific articles. His 1969 book Spherical and Practical Astronomy As Applied to Geodesy became a standard text. He served as an associate editor for the Journal of Geophysical Research and from 1975 to 1987 as editor-in-chief of the Bulletin Géodésique (now merged into the Journal of Geodesy).

Mueller was elected in 1978 a Fellow of the American Geophysical Union (AGU), in 1983 a Corresponding Member of the Austrian Academy of Sciences, and in 1988 an Honorary Member of the Hungarian Academy of Sciences. In 1993 his alma mater, the Technical University of Budapest, awarded him an honorary D.Sc. From 1987 to 1991 he was the president of the International Association of Geodesy (IAG). He was awarded in 2000 the Vening Meinesz Medal of the European Geosciences Union (EGU) and in 2002 the Waldo E. Smith Medal of the American Geophysical Union (AGU). In 2013 the AGU established the Ivan I. Mueller Award for Distinguished Service and Leadership.

Ivan and Marianne Mueller greatly enjoyed opera, as well as orchestral and chamber music. Upon his death in 2023, he was survived by his widow, their two daughters, and four grandchildren.

== Selected publications ==
=== Articles ===
- Mueller, Ivan I. (1961). "The determination of the regional part of the vertical gradient anomaly by a geodetic method". Geofisica Pura e Applicata. 48 (1): 1–6. Bibcode:1961GeoPA..48....1M. doi:10.1007/BF01992361. S2CID 140196421.
- Mueller, Ivan I. (1963). "Geodesy and the Torsion Balance". Journal of the Surveying and Mapping Division. 89 (3): 123–155. doi:10.1061/JSUEAX.0000117.
- Mueller, Ivan I. (1974). "Global satellite triangulation and trilateration results". Journal of Geophysical Research. 79 (35): 5333–5347. Bibcode:1974JGR....79.5333M. doi:10.1029/JB079i035p05333.
- Grafarend, Erik W.; Mueller, Ivan I.; Papo, Haim B.; Richter, Burghard (1979). "Concepts for reference frames in geodesy and geodynamics: The reference directions". Bulletin Géodésique. 53 (3): 195–213. Bibcode:1979BGeod..53..195G. doi:10.1007/BF02523950.
- Soler, T.; Mueller, I. I. (1978). "Global plate tectonics and the secular motion of the Pole". Bulletin Géodésique. 52 (1): 39–57. Bibcode:1978BGeod..52...39S. doi:10.1007/BF02521791. hdl:2060/19770014827.
- Mueller, Ivan I. (1980). "Reference Coordinate Systems for Earth Dynamics: A Preview". International Astronomical Union Colloquium. 56: 1–22. doi:10.1017/S0252921100081069.
- Mueller, Ivan I. (1985). "Reference coordinate systems and frames: Concepts and realization". Journal of Geodesy. 59 (2): 181–188. Bibcode:1985BGeod..59..181M. doi:10.1007/BF02520609. S2CID 122296234.
- "Chapter 5 instrumentation". The Interdisciplinary Role of Space Geodesy. Lecture Notes in Earth Sciences. Vol. 22. 1989. pp. 131–184. doi:10.1007/BFb0049648. ISBN 3-540-51161-X.
- Beutler, Gerhard; Mueller, Ivan I.; Neilan, Ruth E. (1996). "The International GPS Service for Geodynamics (IGS): The Story". GPS Trends in Precise Terrestrial, Airborne, and Spaceborne Applications. International Association of Geodesy Symposia. Vol. 115. pp. 3–13. doi:10.1007/978-3-642-80133-4_1. ISBN 978-3-540-60872-1.
- Mueller, Ivan I. (2000). "The First Decade of the IERS". International Astronomical Union Colloquium. 178: 201–213. doi:10.1017/S0252921100061340. S2CID 129735196. 2000
- Beutler, Gerhard; Moore, Angelyn W.; Mueller, Ivan I. (2009). "The international global navigation satellite systems service (IGS): Development and achievements". Journal of Geodesy. 83 (3–4): 297–307. Bibcode:2009JGeod..83..297B. doi:10.1007/s00190-008-0268-z. S2CID 121034882.

=== Books ===
- Mueller, Ivan Istvan (1964). Introduction to satellite geodesy. New York: Frederick Ungar Publishing Co. LCCN 64015693; xxi+415 pages, illustrated
- Mueller, Ivan Istvan; Rockie, John D. (1966). Gravimetric and celestial geodesy; a glossary of terms. New York: F. Ungar Publishing Co. LCCN 66019470; xi+129 pages, illustrated
- Mueller, Ivan Istvan (1969). Spherical and practical astronomy, as applied to geodesy. New York: F. Ungar Publishing Co. ISBN 0804446679. LCCN 68031453; with a contribution by Heinrich Eichhorn, xxx+615 pages; 2nd edition 1977; 615 pages)
- Mueller, Ivan I.; Ramsayer, Karl H. (1979). Introduction to surveying. F. Ungar Publishing Co. ISBN 0804446660. LCCN 79004835; xvii+324 pages, illustrated
- Moritz, Helmut; Mueller, Ivan I. (1987). Earth rotation: theory and observation. New York: F. Ungar Publishing Co. ISBN 0804446717. LCCN 86030756; xx+617 pages, illustrated
- Kovalevsky, Jean; Mueller, Ivan Istvan; Kołaczek, Barbara, eds. (1989). Reference frames in astronomy and geophysics. Astrophysics and Space Science Library, volume 154. Dordrecht [Holland]; Boston: Kluwer Academic Publishers. ISBN 079230182X. LCCN 89002582; x+474 pages, illustrated; 2012 pbk reprint of 1989 1st edition. Springer. 6 December 2012. ISBN 9789400909335.
- Mueller, Ivan I.; Zerbini, Susanna, eds. (1989). The Interdisciplinary role of space geodesy : proceedings of an international workshop held at "Ettore Majorana" Center for Scientific Culture, International School of Geodesy, Director, Enzo Boschi, Erice, Sicily, Italy, July 23-29, 1988. Lecture Notes in Earth Sciences; 22. Berlin; New York: Springer-Verlag. ISBN 038751161X. LCCN 89011266; xv+300 pages, illustrated
- Mueller, Ivan I.; Kołaczek, Barbara, eds. (1993). Developments in astrometry and their impact on astrophysics and geodynamics : proceedings of the 156th Symposium of the International Astronomical Union held in Shanghai, China, September 15-19, 1992. Dordrecht; Boston: Kluwer Academic. ISBN 0792322371. LCCN 93016750; xxxi+440 pages, illustrated
