= Balloon satellite =

Satellite inflated with gas after being put into orbit

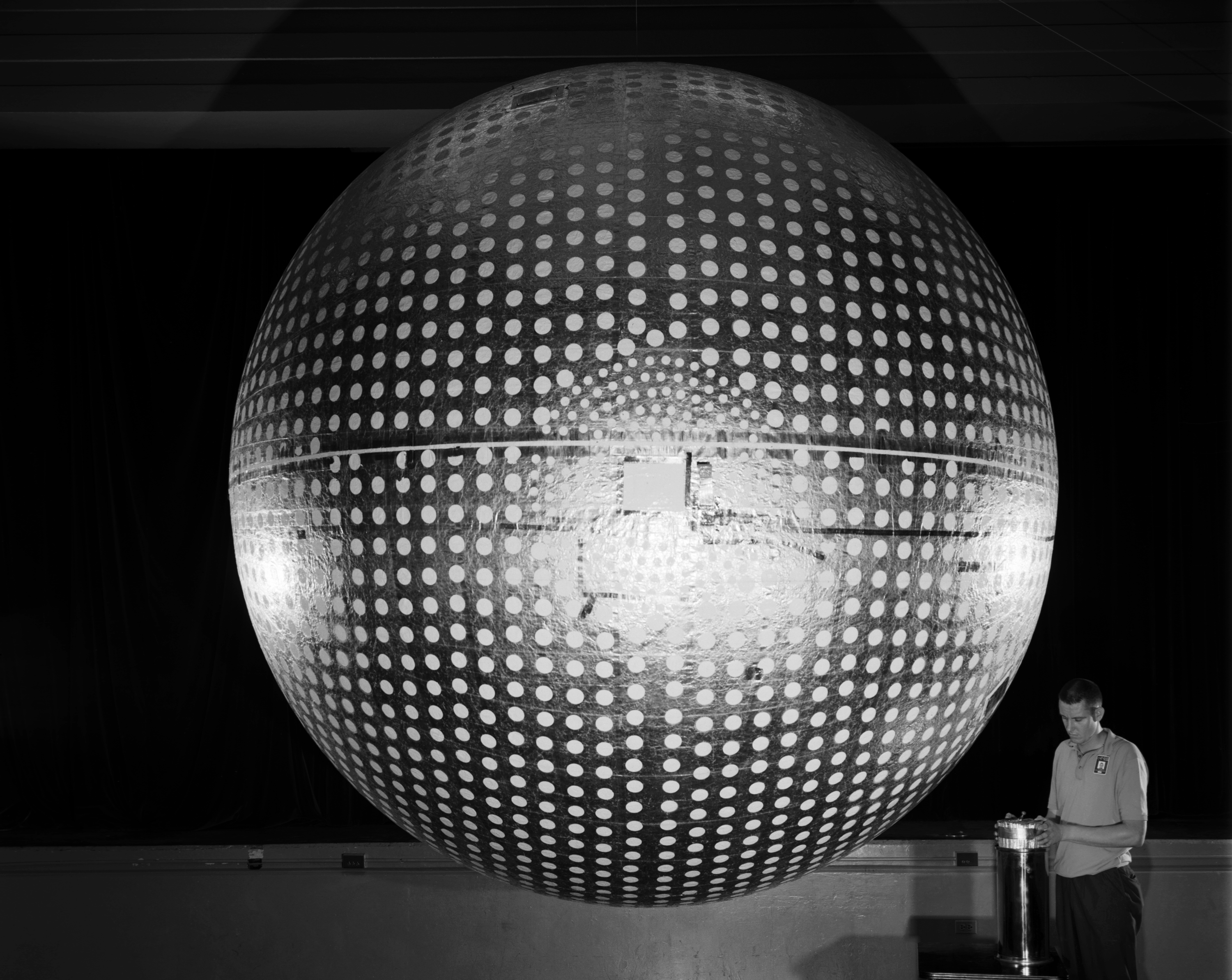
Explorer 24 satellite

A balloon satellite, sometimes referred to as a "satelloon", is a satellite inflated with gas after it has been put into orbit.

== Echo 1 and Echo 2 balloon satellites ==
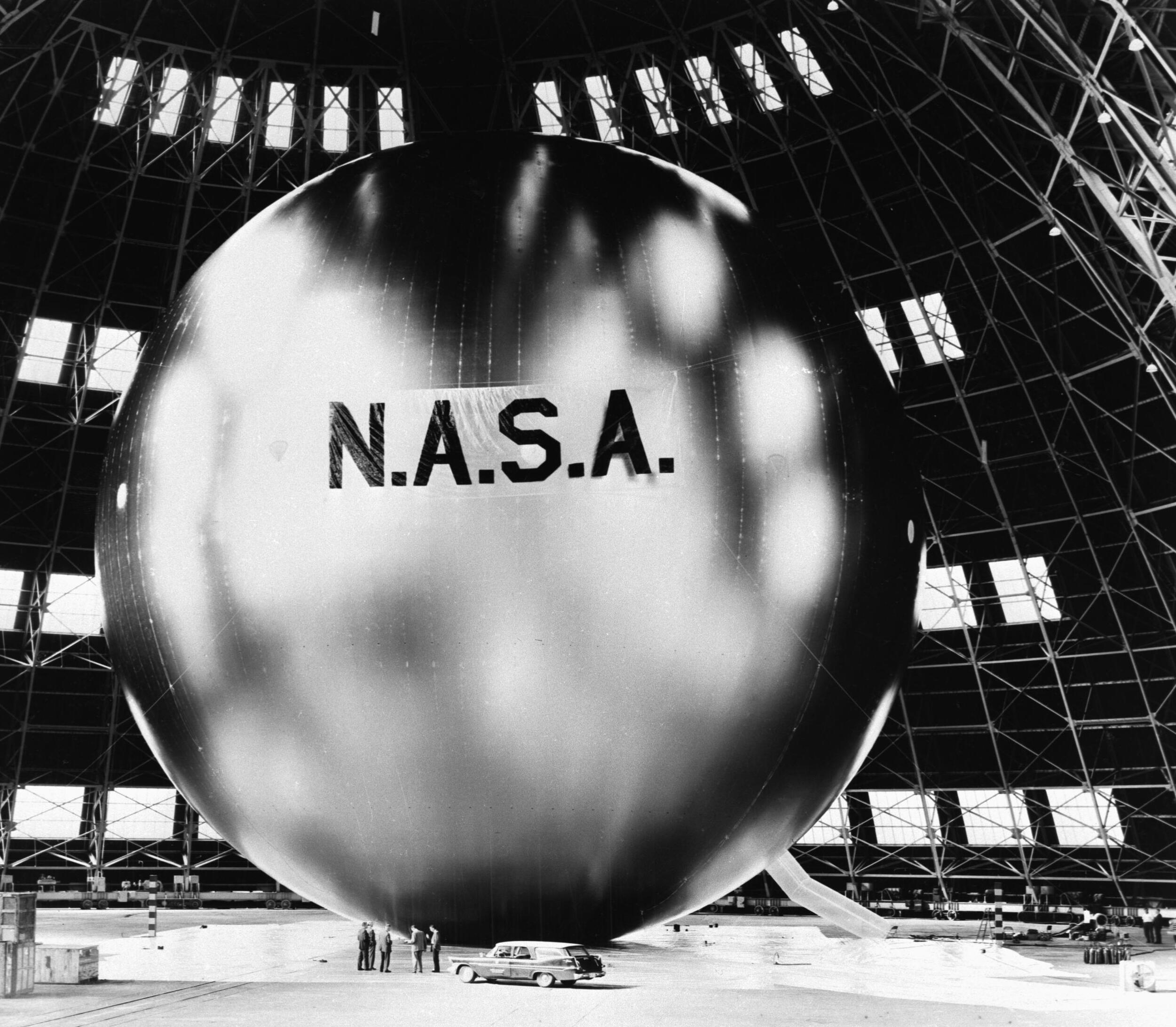
Echo inflation test

The first flying body of this type was Echo 1, which was launched into a 1,600-kilometer (990 mi) high orbit on August 12, 1960, by the United States. It originally had a spherical shape measuring 30 meters (98 ft), with a thin metal-coated plastic shell made of Mylar. It served for testing as a "passive" communication and geodetic satellite.

One of the first radio contacts using the satellite was successful at a distance of nearly 4,000 kilometers (2,500 mi) (between the east coast of the US and California). By the time Echo 1 burned up in 1968, the measurements of its orbit by several dozen earth stations had improved our knowledge of the precise shape of the planet by nearly a factor of ten.

Its successor was the similarly built Echo 2 (1964 to about 1970). This satellite circled the Earth about 400 kilometers (250 mi) lower, not at an angle of 47° like that of Echo 1, but in a polar orbit with an average angle of 81°. This enabled radio contact and measurements to be made at higher latitudes. Taking part in the Echo orbit checks to analyze disturbances in its orbit and in the Earth's gravitational field were thirty to fifty professional earth stations, as well as around two hundred amateur astronomers across the planet in "Moonwatch" stations; these contributed around half of all sightings.

== Range of radio waves, visibility ==
The Pythagorean theorem allows us to calculate easily how far a satellite is visible at such a great height. It can be determined that a satellite in a 1,500-kilometer (930 mi) orbit rises and sets when the horizontal distance is 4,600 kilometers (2,900 mi). However, the atmosphere causes this figure to vary slightly. Thus if two radio stations are 9,000 kilometers (5,600 mi) apart and the satellite's orbit goes between them, they may be able to receive each other's reflected radio signals if the signals are strong enough.

Optical visibility is, however, lower than that of radio waves, because

- the satellite must be illuminated by the sun
- the observer needs a dark sky (that is, they must be in the Earth's own shadow on the planet's twilight or night side)
- the brightness of a sphere depends on the angle between the incident light and the observer (see phases of the moon)
- the brightness of a sphere is much reduced as it approaches the horizon, as atmospheric extinction swallows up as much as 90% of the light

Despite this there is no problem observing a flying body such as Echo 1 for precise purposes of satellite geodesy, down to a 20° elevation, which corresponds to a distance of 2,900 kilometers (1,800 mi). In theory this means that distances of up to 5,000 kilometers (3,100 mi) between measuring points can be "bridged", and in practice this can be accomplished at up to 3,000–4,000 kilometers (1,900–2,500 mi).

For visual and photographic observation of bright satellites and balloons, and regarding their geodetic use, see Echo 1 and Pageos for further information.

== Other balloon satellites ==
For special testing purposes two or three satellites of the Explorer series were constructed as balloons (possibly Explorer 19 and 38).

Echo 1 was an acknowledged success of radio engineering, but the passive principle of telecommunications (reflection of radio waves on the balloon's surface) was soon replaced by active systems. Telstar 1 (1962) and Early Bird (1965) were able to transmit several hundred audio channels simultaneously in addition to a television program exchanged between continents.

Satellite geodesy with Echo 1 and 2 was able to fulfill all expectations not only for the planned 2–3 years, but for nearly 10 years. For this reason NASA soon planned the launch of the even larger 40-meter (130 ft) balloon Pageos. The name is from "passive geodesic satellite", and sounds similar to "Geos", a successful active electronic satellite from 1965.

=== Pageos and the global network ===
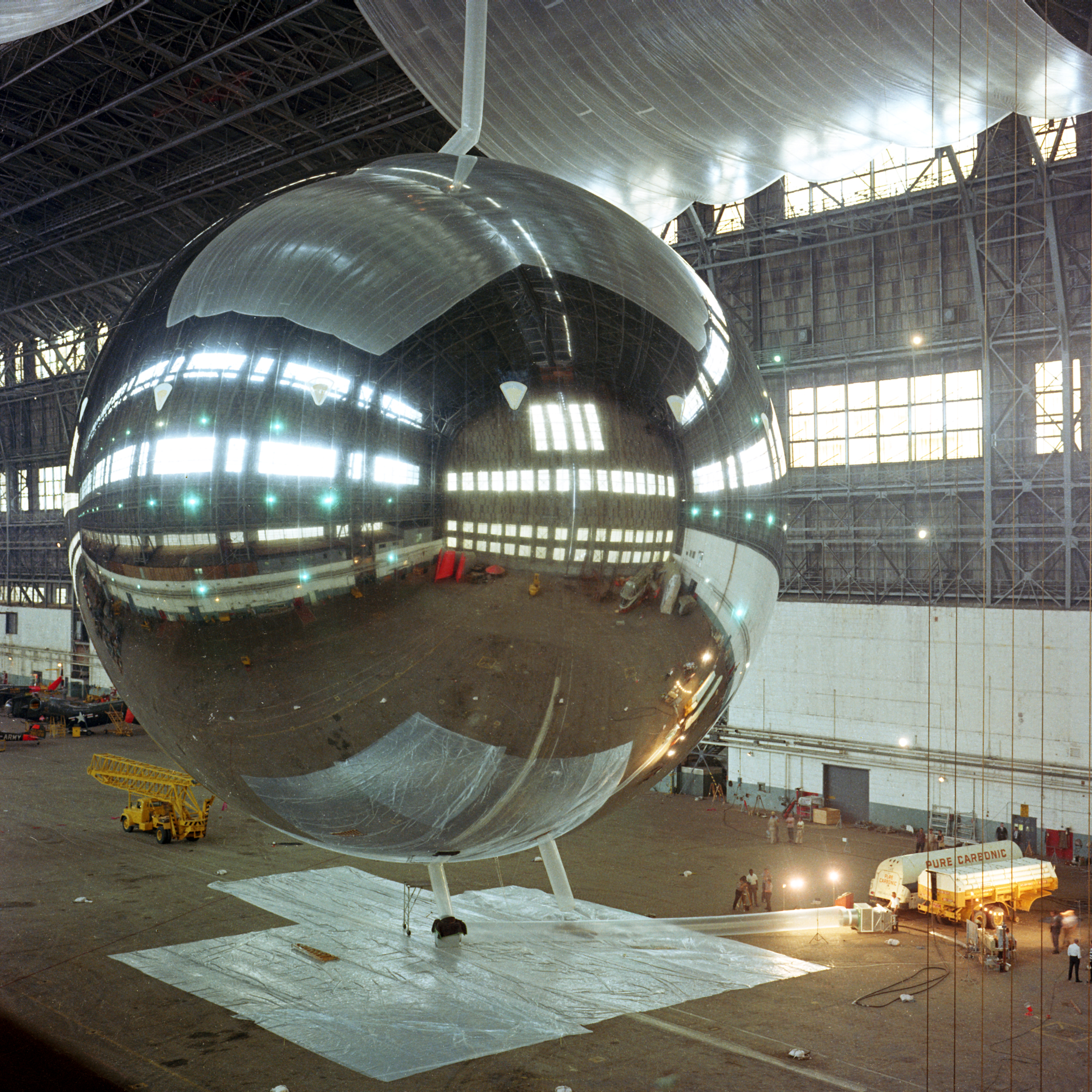
Test inflation of PAGEOS

Pageos was specially launched for the "global network of satellite geodesy", which occupied about 20 full-time observing teams all over the world until 1973. All together they recorded 3000 usable photographic plates from 46 tracking stations with calibrated all-electronic BC-4 cameras (1:3 / focal length 30 and 45 cm (12 and 18 in)). From these images they were able to calculate the stations' position three-dimensionally with a precision of about 4 meters (13 ft). The coordinator of this project was Professor Hellmut Schmid, from the ETH Zurich.

Three stations of the global network were situated in Europe: Catania in Sicily, Hohenpeißenberg in Bavaria and Tromsø in northern Norway. For the completion of the navigational network exact distance measurements were needed; these were taken on four continents and across Europe with a precision of 0.5 millimeters (0.020 in) per kilometer.

The global network enabled the calculation of a "geodetic date" (the geocentric position of the measurement system) on different continents, within a few meters. By the early 1970s reliable values for nearly 100 coefficients of the Earth's gravity field could be calculated.

=== 1965–1975: Success with flashing light beacons ===
Bright balloon satellites are well visible and were measurable on fine-grained (less sensitive) photographic plates, even at the beginning of space travel, but there were problems with the exact chronometry of a satellite's track. In those days it could only be determined within a few milliseconds.

Since satellites circle the earth at about 7–8 kilometers per second (4.3–5.0 mi/s), a time error of 0.002 second translates into a deviation of about 15 meters (49 ft). In order to meet a new goal of measuring the tracking stations precisely within a couple of years, a method of flashing light beacons was adopted around 1960.

To build a three-dimensional measuring network, geodesy needs exactly defined target points, more so than a precise time. This precision is easily reached by having two tracking stations record the same series of flashes from one satellite.

Flash beacon technology was already mature in 1965 when the small electronic satellite Geos 1 was launched in November 1965. With its companion, Geos 2, that was launched in January 1968, the GEOS system brought about a remarkable increase in measurement precision.

From about 1975 on, almost all optical measurement methods lost their importance, as they were overtaken by speedy progress in electronic distance measurement. Only newly developed methods of observation using CCD and the highly precise star positions of the astrometry satellite Hipparcos made further improvement possible in the measurement of distance.

== List of balloon satellites ==
List of balloon satellites (sorted by launch date)
| Satellite | Launch date (UTC) | Decay | Mass(kg) | Diameter(m) | NSSDC ID | Nation | Usage |
|---|---|---|---|---|---|---|---|
| Beacon 1 | 1958-10-24 03:21 | N/A (launch failure) | 4.2 | 3.66 | 1958-F18 | US | ado |
| Beacon 2 | 1959-08-15 00:31:00 | N/A (launch failure) | 4.2 | 3.66 | 1959-F07 | US | ado |
| Echo 1 | 1960-08-12 09:36:00 | 1968-05-24 | 180 | 30.48 | 1960-009A | US | pcr, ado, spc, tri |
| Explorer 9 | 1961-02-16 13:12:00 | 1964-04-09 | 36 | 3.66 | 1961-004A | US | ado |
| Explorer 19 (AD-A) | 1963-12-19 18:43:00 | 1981-10-05 | 7.7 | 3.66 | 1963-053A | US | ado |
| Echo 2 | 1964-01-25 13:55:00 | 1969-06-07 | 256 | 41 | 1964-004A | US | pcr, tri |
| Explorer 24 (AD-B) | 1964-11-21 17:17:00 | 1968-10-18 | 8.6 | 3.6 | 1964-076A | US | ado |
| PAGEOS 1 | 1966-06-24 00:14:00 | 1975-07-12 | 56.7 | 30.48 | 1966-056A | US | tri |
| PasComSat (OV1-8) | 1966-07-14 02:10:02 | 1978-01-04 | 3.2 | 9.1 | 1966-063A | US | pcr |
| Explorer 39 (AD-C) | 1968-08-08 20:12:00 | 1981-06-22 | 9.4 | 3.6 | 1968-066A | US | ado |
| Mylar Balloon | 1971-08-07 00:11:00 | 1981-09-01 | 0.8 | 2.13 | 1971-067F | US | ado |
| Qi Qiu Weixing 1 | 1990-09-03 00:53:00 | 1991-03-11 | 4 | 3 | 1990-081B | PRC | ado |
| Qi Qiu Weixing 2 | 1990-09-03 00:53:00 | 1991-07-24 | 4 | 2.5 | 1990-081C | PRC | ado |
| Naduvaniy gazovoy balloon | 1991-03-30 (?) | | | | 1986-017FJ | RU | |
| Orbital Reflector | 2018-12-03 | | | | | US | sculpture |

abbreviations:

- ado = atmospheric density observations
- pcr = passive communications reflector, satellite reflects microwave signals.
- spc = solar pressure calculations, estimate impact of solar wind on orbit.
- tri = satellite triangulation, measuring the Earth's surface.

== See also ==
- Balloon-borne telescope
- Project Beacon
- Telecommunications
- Ionosphere
- Satellite geodesy
- List of passive satellites

== Sources ==
- NSSDC Master Catalog
- Heavens-Above
- Jonathan's Space Report (HUGE: 5MB!)
- Astronautix, Mir EO-9
