= Thomas A. Herring =

Thomas A. Herring (born 17 July 1955 in Cooroy, Queensland, Australia) is a geophysicist, known for developing and applying systems of space geodesy to high-precision geophysical measurements and geodynamic research.

== Education and career ==
At the University of Queensland, Herring graduated in surveying with a bachelor's degree in 1976 and a master's degree in 1978. At Massachusetts Institute of Technology (MIT), he graduated in 1983 with a Ph.D. in Earth and Planetary Sciences. His Ph.D. thesis entitled The precision and accuracy of intercontinental distance determinations using radio interferometry was supervised by Irwin I. Shapiro. Herring was from 1979 to 1983 a research assistant in MIT's Department of Earth and Planetary Sciences and from 1983 to 1989 a research associate at Harvard University. At MIT, he was from 1989 to 1997 an associate professor in the department of Earth, atmospheric, and planetary sciences and is since 1997 a professor of geophysics. In 1986 he was a visiting scientist in the Division of National Mapping of the Australian Department of Energy and Resources.

Herring is one of the pioneers of using very-long-baseline interferometry (VLBI) for centimeter-precision measurements of intercontinental distances and several other geophysical applications. Using VLBI, he and his colleagues published conclusive, high-precision evidence of tectonic plate motions. As part of a four-member team, Herring used VLBI data to publish an empirical nutation model, which was used by the International Earth Rotation Service for a considerable time. In 2002, the Mathews-Herring-Buffett transfer function was introduced for determining the Free Core Nutation (FCN) resonance from VLBI observation of nutation, thus significantly improving the accuracy of determining important properties of the Earth's core. Herring was among the pioneers who used the global positioning system (GPS) for better understanding of geodynamics, including highly accurate measurements of variations of the rate of Earth's rotation. He has used GPS, VLBI, and InSar in his research on atmospheric water vapor. In earthquake research, he has been a member of teams that used GPS and VLBI data to determine velocity fields for crustal deformations in southern and central California. In 2012 he was the principal investigator for a project on reservoir modeling.

Herring and his colleagues at MIT have developed computer software that uses Global Navigation Satellite System (GNSS) data to analyze GNSS measurements, primarily for the purpose of studying deformations in the Earth's crust. The software GAMIT/GLOBK (GNSS At MIT/Global Kalman filter) was developed at MIT. GAMIT accepts phase data and returns estimates of "three-dimensional relative positions of ground stations and satellite orbits, atmospheric zenith delays, and Earth orientation parameters." GLOBK accepts as input computed derivations from "GPS, VLBI, and SLR experiments" and, by means of a Kalman filter algorithm, gives output consisting of statistical estimates from various combinations of such derivations. GAMIT/GLOBK requires a basic Unix- or Linux-based operating system, as well as several software prerequisites.

Herring is the author or co-author of more than 80 scientific publications. He has served as a member of many scientific working groups, panels, and committees. From 1994 to 1996 he served on the editorial board of the Journal of Geodynamics. He was an associate editor from 1989 to 1992 for the Journal of Geophysical Research, from 1994 to 1996 the Journal of Geophysical Research: Solid Earth, and from 1999 to 2009 for the Journal of Geodesy.

Herring received in 1991 the Macelwane Medal from the American Geophysical Union (AGU), of which he is a Fellow. In 1992 he gave the AGU's Francis Birch Lecture. He received in 1995 the Bomford Prize of the International Association of Geodesy (IAG). and in 2007 the Vening Meinesz Medal of the European Geosciences Union (EGU). He was elected a Fellow in 1999 of the IAG and in 2013 of the American Association for the Advancement of Science (AAAS).

== Selected publications ==
- Davis, J. L.; Herring, T. A.; Shapiro, I. I.; Rogers, A. E. E.; Elgered, G. (1985). "Geodesy by radio interferometry: Effects of atmospheric modeling errors on estimates of baseline length". Radio Science. 20 (6): 1593–1607. Bibcode:1985RaSc...20.1593D. doi:10.1029/RS020i006p01593.
- Herring, T. A.; Gwinn, C. R.; Shapiro, I. I. (1986). "Geodesy by radio interferometry: Studies of the forced nutations of the Earth: 1. Data analysis". Journal of Geophysical Research: Solid Earth. 91 (B5): 4745–4754. Bibcode:1986JGR....91.4745H. doi:10.1029/JB091iB05p04745.
- Bevis, Michael; Businger, Steven; Herring, Thomas A.; Rocken, Christian; Anthes, Richard A.; Ware, Randolph H. (1992). "GPS meteorology: Remote sensing of atmospheric water vapor using the global positioning system". Journal of Geophysical Research: Atmospheres. 97 (D14): 15787–15801. Bibcode:1992JGR....9715787B. doi:10.1029/92JD01517.
- Herring, T. A. (1992). "Modelling atmospheric delays in the analysis of space geodetic data" (PDF). In De Munck, J. C.; Spoelstra, T. A. Th. (eds.). Proceedings of Refraction of Transatmospheric Signals in Geodesy. Vol. 36. Netherlands Geodetic Commission Publications on Geodesy. pp. 157–164. (invited lecture)
- Bevis, Michael; Businger, Steven; Chiswell, Steven; Herring, Thomas A.; Anthes, Richard A.; Rocken, Christian; Ware, Randolph H. (1994). "GPS Meteorology: Mapping Zenith Wet Delays onto Precipitable Water". Journal of Applied Meteorology. 33 (3): 379–386. Bibcode:1994JApMe..33..379B. doi:10.1175/1520-0450(1994)033<0379:GMMZWD>2.0.CO;2. JSTOR 26186685.
- Lebach, D. E.; Corey, B. E.; Shapiro, I. I.; Ratner, M. I.; Webber, J. C.; Rogers, A. E. E.; Davis, J. L.; Herring, T. A. (1995). "Measurement of the Solar Gravitational Deflection of Radio Waves Using Very-Long-Baseline Interferometry". Physical Review Letters. 75 (8): 1439–1442. Bibcode:1995PhRvL..75.1439L. doi:10.1103/PhysRevLett.75.1439. PMID 10060299.
- Chen, G.; Herring, T. A. (1997). "Effects of atmospheric azimuthal asymmetry on the analysis of space geodetic data". Journal of Geophysical Research: Solid Earth. 102 (B9): 20489–20502. Bibcode:1997JGR...10220489C. doi:10.1029/97JB01739.
- Dong, D.; Herring, T. A.; King, R. W. (1998). "Estimating regional deformation from a combination of space and terrestrial geodetic data". Journal of Geodesy. 72 (4): 200–214. Bibcode:1998JGeod..72..200D. doi:10.1007/s001900050161. S2CID 121266793.
- Tregoning, P.; Herring, T. A. (2006). "Impact of a priori zenith hydrostatic delay errors on GPS estimates of station heights and zenith total delays". Geophysical Research Letters. 33 (23). Bibcode:2006GeoRL..3323303T. doi:10.1029/2006GL027706. hdl:1885/23882. S2CID 31692738.
- Herring, Thomas A.; Melbourne, Timothy I.; Murray, Mark H.; Floyd, Michael A.; Szeliga, Walter M.; King, Robert W.; Phillips, David A.; Puskas, Christine M.; Santillan, Marcelo; Wang, Lei (2016). "Plate Boundary Observatory and related networks: GPS data analysis methods and geodetic products". Reviews of Geophysics. 54 (4): 759–808. Bibcode:2016RvGeo..54..759H. doi:10.1002/2016RG000529. hdl:1721.1/118401. S2CID 92984118.
