= Stellar triangulation =

Stellar triangulation is a method of geodesy and of its subdiscipline space geodesy used to measure Earth's geometric shape. Stars were first used for this purpose by the Finnish astronomer Yrjö Väisälä in 1959, who made astrometric photographs of the night sky at two stations together with a lighted balloon probe between them.

Even this first step showed the potential of the method, as Väisälä got the azimuth between Helsinki and Turku (a distance of 150 km) with an accuracy of 1″. Soon the method was successfully tested by ballistic rockets and for some special satellites.

Adequate computer programs were written for

- the astrometric reduction of the photographic plates,
- the intersection of the "observation planes" containing the stations and the targets,
- and the least-squares adjustment of stellar-terrestrial networks with redundancy.

The advantages of stellar triangulation were the possibility to cross far distances (terrestrial observations are restricted to approx. 30 km, and even in high mountains to 60 km), and the independency of the Earth's gravity field. The results are azimuths between the stations in the stellar-inertial navigation system, despite no direct line of sight.

In 1960, the first appropriate space probe was launched: Project Echo, a 30 m diameter balloon satellite. By then the whole of Western Europe could be linked together geodetically with accuracies 2–10 times better than by classical triangulation.

During the late 1960s, a global project was begun by H.H. Schmid (Switzerland) to connect 45 stations all over the continents, with distances of 3000–5000 km. It was finished in 1974 by precise reduction of some 3000 stellar plates and network adjustment of 46 stations (2 additional ones in Germany and the Pacific, but without the areas of Russia and China). The mean accuracy was between ±5 m (Europe, USA) and 7–10 m (Africa, Antarctica), depending on weather and infrastructure conditions. Combined with Doppler measurements (such as from Transit) the global accuracy was even 3 m. This is more than 20 times better than previously, because the gravity field up to 1974 couldn't be calculated better than 100 meters between distant continents.

The use of stars as a reference system was expanded in the 70s and early 80s for continental networks, but then the laser and electronic distance measurements became better than 2 m and could be carried out automatically. Nowadays some similar techniques are carried out by interferometry with very distant radio quasars (VLBI) instead of optical satellite & star observations. The geodetic connection of radio telescopes is now possible up to mm–cm precision as published periodically by the community. This global project group was founded in 2000 by Harald Schuh (Munich/TU Vienna) and some dozen research projects worldwide, and is now a permanent service of International Union of Geodesy and Geophysics (IUGG) and International Earth Rotation and Reference Systems Service (IERS).

The photographic observations as done in 1959–1985 are considered irrelevant now because of their expense, but they have led to a revival of electro-optical techniques like CCD.

== See also ==
- Figure of the Earth
- Fundamental station
- Triangulation
- Trilateration
- Satellite geodesy
  - Satellite geodesy#Optical triangulation
- PAGEOS satellite
- Satellite laser ranging (SLR)
- Stellar parallax for distances to stars
