= Vening Meinesz Medal =

European award for research in geodesy

The Vening Meinesz Medal is an annual award for outstanding research in geodesy.

== Background ==
The medal, inaugurated in 1994, has been awarded by the European Geosciences Union (EGU) since 2004, and before that by the European Geophysical Society (EGS). The medal is named in honor of Felix Andries Vening Meinesz, a Dutch geophysicists and geodesist, famous for his invention enabling precise measurements of gravity at sea. The portrait medal was designed by the Hungarian artist József Kótai, renowned for his work as a medalist, goldsmith, and silversmith.

The medal should not be confused with the NWO Vening Meinesz Prijs, a prize given, every two years, to outstanding young scientists who work in the geosciences and are employed in the Netherlands.

== Recipients ==
- 1998 Reiner Rummel
- 1999 Anny Cazenave
- 2000 Ivan I. Mueller
- 2002 Georges Balmino
- 2002 Christoph Reigber
- 2003 Véronique Dehant
- 2004 John M. Wahr
- 2005 Martine Feissel-Vernier
- 2006 Gerhard Beutler
- 2007 Thomas A. Herring
- 2008 Carl Christian Tscherning
- 2009 Susanna Zerbini
- 2010 Philip L. Woodworth
- 2011 Harald Schuh
- 2012 Che-Kwan Shum
- 2013 Zuheir Altamimi
- 2014 Reinhard Dietrich
- 2015 Geoffrey Blewitt
- 2016 Srinivas Bettadpur
- 2017 Isabella Velicogna
- 2018 Markus Rothacher
- 2019 Tonie van Dam
- 2020 Willi Freeden
- 2021 Christopher Jekeli
- 2022 Peter J. G. Teunissen
- 2023 Jürgen Müller
- 2024 Jeffrey T. Freymueller
