= S56 =

S56 may refer to:

== Aircraft ==
- Blériot-SPAD S.56, a family of prototype French airliners
- Savoia-Marchetti S.56, an Italian flying boat
- Sikorsky S-56, an American helicopter
- Sukhoi S-56, a proposed Russian carrier fighter

== Other uses ==
- S56 (Long Island bus)
- S56 (New York City bus) serving Staten Island
- County Route S56 (Bergen County, New Jersey)
- Explorer S-56 (satellite), a failed American spacecraft
- GER Class S56, a British steam locomotive
- INS Sindhudhvaj (S56), a submarine of the Indian Navy
- Prince Skyline (S56), a Japanese automobile
- S56: Dispose of this material and its container at hazardous or special waste collection point, a safety phrase
- Soviet submarine S-56
- Siemens S56, a Siemens mobile phone
