= Tonie van Dam =

Geophysicist

Tonie Marie van Dam (born April 19, 1960) is an American geophysicist and geodesist, known for her pioneering research on solid Earth deformations due to loads from atmospheric and hydrologic pressures. She and her collaborators used space geodetic observations and modeling for increased precision in measuring and understanding such loads.

== Biography ==
Tonie van Dam graduated in 1982 with a B.S. in physics and geology from Mary Washington College (now renamed the University of Mary Washington). At the University of Colorado Boulder, she graduated in 1991 with a Ph.D. in geophysics. Her Ph.D. thesis Atmospheric Load Response of the Solid Earth and Oceans was supervised by John M. Wahr. From 1991 to 1993 she was a postdoc at Massachusetts Institute of Technology (MIT). From 1993 to 2000 she worked for the U.S. civil service as a research geophysicist at the Geosciences Laboratory of the National Geodetic Survey (part of the National Oceanic and Atmospheric Administration). In the Faculté des Sciences, de la Technologie et de la Communication at the University of Luxembourg, she was an associate professor from 2006 to 2013 and a full professor from 2013 to 2019. (In language skills, she has functional ability in French and basic skills in both Luxembourgish and Spanish.) In 2020 she was appointed to a full professorship in the University of Utah's Department of Geology and Geophysics.

Van Dam is the author or coauthor of more than 120 publications. Her research focuses on the geodesy and geophysics of loads from atmospheric and hydrologic pressures. Her 2001 article Crustal displacements due to continental water loading (written with six collaborators, including John M. Wahr, Geoffrey Blewitt, and Kristine M. Larson) is considered a classic in geodesy. Van Dam has served the community of geophysicists and geodesist in several capacities and since 2019 is a member of the board of directors of UNAVCO. She is an associate editor for the Institute of Geophysics of the Czech Academy of Sciences's Studia Geophysica et Geodaetica from 2010 to the present and for the International Association of Geodesy's Journal of Geodesy from 2015 to the present.

In 2017 van Dam was awarded Luxembourg's Grand Prix en Sciences de l'Institut Grand-ducal, Science Geologiques/Prix Feidt. The American Geophysical Union (AGU) in 2017 appointed her the Bowie Lecturer and in 2020 elected her a Fellow of the AGU. She received in 2019 the European Geosciences Union's Vening Meinesz Medal.

== Selected publications ==
- Lavallée, David A.; Van Dam, Tonie; Blewitt, Geoffrey; Clarke, Peter J. (2006). "Geocenter motions from GPS: A unified observation model". Journal of Geophysical Research: Solid Earth. 111 (B5). Bibcode:2006JGRB..111.5405L. doi:10.1029/2005JB003784. (See Global Positioning System (GPS).)
- Ray, J.; Altamimi, Z.; Collilieux, X.; Van Dam, T. (2008). "Anomalous harmonics in the spectra of GPS position estimates". GPS Solutions. 12 (1): 55–64. Bibcode:2008GPSS...12...55R. doi:10.1007/s10291-007-0067-7. S2CID 9929944.
- Tesmer, Volker; Steigenberger, Peter; Van Dam, Tonie; Mayer-Gürr, Torsten (2011). "Vertical deformations from homogeneously processed GRACE and global GPS long-term series". Journal of Geodesy. 85 (5): 291–310. Bibcode:2011JGeod..85..291T. doi:10.1007/s00190-010-0437-8. S2CID 121704976. (See GRACE and GRACE-FO.)
- Wu, Xiaoping; Ray, Jim; Van Dam, Tonie (2012). "Geocenter motion and its geodetic and geophysical implications". Journal of Geodynamics. 58: 44–61. Bibcode:2012JGeo...58...44W. doi:10.1016/j.jog.2012.01.007.
- Li, Bailing; Rodell, Matthew; Zaitchik, Benjamin F.; Reichle, Rolf H.; Koster, Randal D.; Van Dam, Tonie M. (2012). "Assimilation of GRACE terrestrial water storage into a land surface model: Evaluation and potential value for drought monitoring in western and central Europe". Journal of Hydrology. 446–447: 103–115. Bibcode:2012JHyd..446..103L. doi:10.1016/j.jhydrol.2012.04.035. hdl:2060/20120010402. S2CID 16249455.
- Van Dam, T.; Collilieux, X.; Wuite, J.; Altamimi, Z.; Ray, J. (2012). "Nontidal ocean loading: Amplitudes and potential effects in GPS height time series". Journal of Geodesy. 86 (11): 1043–1057. Bibcode:2012JGeod..86.1043V. doi:10.1007/s00190-012-0564-5.
- Wahr, John; Khan, Shfaqat A.; Van Dam, Tonie; Liu, Lin; Van Angelen, Jan H.; Van Den Broeke, Michiel R.; Meertens, Charles M. (2013). "The use of GPS horizontals for loading studies, with applications to northern California and southeast Greenland" (PDF). Journal of Geophysical Research: Solid Earth. 118 (4): 1795–1806. Bibcode:2013JGRB..118.1795W. doi:10.1002/jgrb.50104.
- Jiang, Weiping; Li, Zhao; Van Dam, Tonie; Ding, Wenwu (2013). "Comparative analysis of different environmental loading methods and their impacts on the GPS height time series". Journal of Geodesy. 87 (7): 687–703. Bibcode:2013JGeod..87..687J. doi:10.1007/s00190-013-0642-3. S2CID 121416391.
- Jin, Shuanggen; Van Dam, Tonie; Wdowinski, Shimon (2013). "Observing and understanding the Earth system variations from space geodesy". Journal of Geodynamics. 72: 1–10. Bibcode:2013JGeo...72....1J. doi:10.1016/j.jog.2013.08.001.
- Khan, Shfaqat A.; Sasgen, Ingo; Bevis, Michael; Van Dam, Tonie; Bamber, Jonathan L.; Wahr, John; Willis, Michael; Kjær, Kurt H.; Wouters, Bert; Helm, Veit; Csatho, Beata; Fleming, Kevin; Bjørk, Anders A.; Aschwanden, Andy; Knudsen, Per; Munneke, Peter Kuipers (2016). "Geodetic measurements reveal similarities between post–Last Glacial Maximum and present-day mass loss from the Greenland ice sheet". Science Advances. 2 (9) e1600931. Bibcode:2016SciA....2E0931K. doi:10.1126/sciadv.1600931. PMC 5031466. PMID 27679819.
