= Explorer 39 =

NASA satellite of the Explorer program

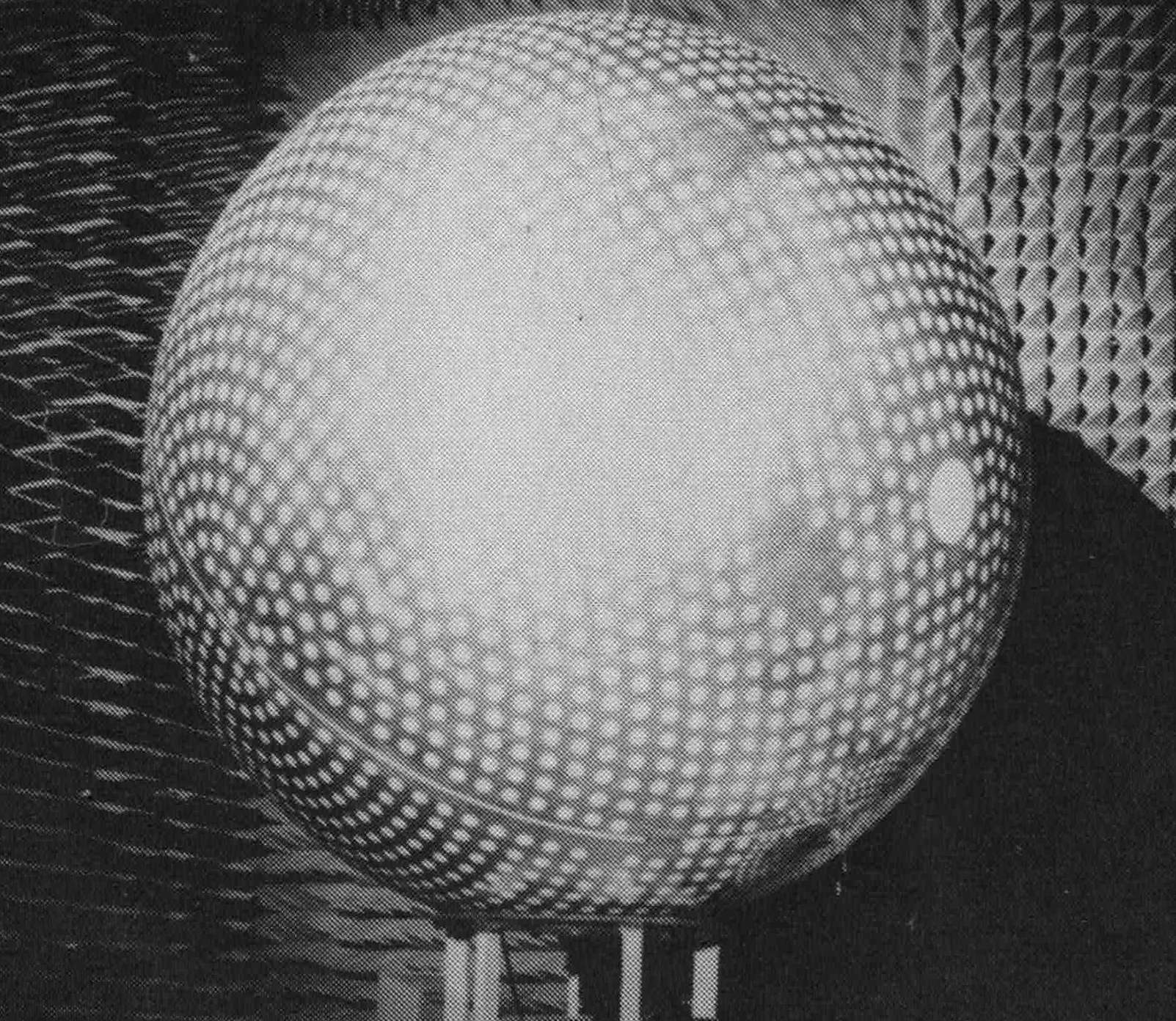
- Explorer 39 satellite
- Names: AD-C; Air Density experiment-C
- Mission type: Air density
- Operator: NASA
- COSPAR ID: 1968-066A
- SATCAT no.: 03337

Spacecraft properties
- Spacecraft: Explorer XXXIX
- Spacecraft type: Explorer
- Bus: AD
- Manufacturer: Langley Research Center
- Launch mass: 9.4 kg (21 lb)
- Dimensions: 3.6 m (12 ft) diameter
- Power: Solar cells and rechargeable batteries

Start of mission
- Launch date: 8 August 1968, 20:12:00 GMT
- Rocket: Scout B (S-165C)
- Launch site: Vandenberg, SLC-5
- Contractor: Vought
- Entered service: 8 August 1968

End of mission
- Last contact: June 1971
- Decay date: 22 June 1981

Orbital parameters
- Reference system: Geocentric orbit
- Regime: Low Earth orbit
- Perigee altitude: 670 km (420 mi)
- Apogee altitude: 2,538 km (1,577 mi)
- Inclination: 80.60°
- Period: 118.20 minutes

Instruments
- Nonsystematic Changes of Air Density; Systematic Changes of Air Density

Explorer 39, also known as AD-C (Air Density experiment-C), was a NASA scientific satellite belonging to series Air Density. It was launched on 8 August 1968, join with Explorer 40, from Launch Complex 5 of the Vandenberg Air Force Base, through a Scout launch vehicle.

== Spacecraft ==
Explorer 39 was an inflatable sphere, 3.6 m (12 ft) in diameter. It was orbited to make atmospheric density determinations. The satellite was successfully launched into a nearly polar, highly elliptical orbit. It was folded and carried into orbit, together with ejection and inflation equipment, as part of the payload of Explorer 40. Two density experiments were performed.

== Launch ==
Explorer 39 orbited the Earth once every 118.20 minutes, at an inclination of 80.60°. Its perigee was 670 km (420 mi) and apogee was 2,538 km (1,577 mi).

== Mission ==
One involved the study of systematic density variation, and the other was concerned with nonsystematic density changes. The upper atmospheric densities were derived from sequential observations of the sphere by use of an attached 136.620-MHz radio tracking beacon and by optical tracking. The radio beacon ceased transmitting in June 1971. Since that time it has been necessary to rely solely on the Smithsonian Astrophysical Observatory (SAO) Baker-Nunn camera network for tracking.

== Experiments ==
=== Nonsystematic Changes of Air Density ===
This experiment was designed to determine nonsystematic upper atmospheric density changes. The data are derived from studies of the drag on a 3.6 m (12 ft) in diameter low-density sphere caused by short-term differences in solar activity. Density values near perigee were deduced from sequential observations of the spacecraft position using optical (Baker-Nunn camera network) and radio and/or radar tracking techniques. This experiment has determined reasonable density values, and it is capable of yielding long-term atmospheric density values, as Explorer 39 has an expected orbital lifetime of 50 years.

=== Systematic Changes of Air Density ===
This experiment was designed to determine systematic changes of air density as a function of altitude, latitude, and time of day, by measuring the drag on a 3.6 m (12 ft) in diameter low-density sphere with ground tracking.

== Decay ==
Explorer 39 reentered the atmosphere on 22 June 1981.

== See also ==
- Explorer 19
- Explorer 24
- Explorer program
