= Hellmut Schmid =

Hellmut H. Schmid (12 September 1914 – 27 April 1998) was a Swiss professor of geodesy and photogrammetry. He taught at ETH Zürich (Switzerland). In the 1950s, he worked on space exploration in the United States. Between 1968 and 1974, he promoted the first intercontinental network of satellite geodesy.

== Research ==
- Geodetic measurement methods at the V2 project in Peenemünde (~1942)
- Beginnings of satellite geodesy 1959
- Theory of analytical photogrammetry and matrix/IT developments (1950s, USA)
- High precision evaluation of photogram (ca. 1965-1978)
- Worldwide Satellite Triangulation Network (1969-1973 (publ. 1974): first regular intercontinental network, 46 stations (3000–5000 km apart), pioneering accuracy (±3m)
- Contributions to the least-squares adjustment, network optimization, Block triangulation
- Optimization of coordinate transformations (~1975)
- Development of 3D intersection methods in analytical photogrammetry

== See also ==
- PAGEOS, balloon satellites, stellar triangulation
- Global reference ellipsoid, "Earth polyhedron", geodetic system, WGS84
- ETH Zürich, Ohio State University, Friedrich Hopfner

== Literature ==
- K.Ledersteger: "'Astronomische und Physikalische Geodäsie (Erdmessung)", JEK Vol.V (870 S., espec. §§ 2, 5, 13), J.B.Metzler, Stuttgart 1968
- H.H. Schmid: "Das Weltnetz der Satellitentriangulation". Wiss. Mitteilungen ETH Zürich and Journal of Geophysical Research, 1974.
- Klaus Schnädelbach et al.: Western European Satellite Triangulation Programme (WEST), 2nd Experimental Computation. Mitteilungen Geodät.Inst. Graz 11/1, Graz 1972
- Nothnagel, Schlüter, Seeger: Die Geschichte der geodätischen VLBI in Deutschland, Bonn 2000
- ZfV 1998: Hellmut H. Schmid † (obituary).
- Professor Dr. h.c. HellmutH. Schmid (1914- 1998)
- "Dr. Schmid leaves Aberdeen after 12 year to join staff at GIMRADA": United States. Department of the Army (1960). Army Research and Development. Department of Defense, Department of the Army, Army Materiel Development and Readiness Command, Development and Engineering Directorate.
