= John M. Wahr =

John Matthew Wahr (June 22, 1951, Ann Arbor, Michigan – November 11, 2015, Boulder, Colorado) was an American geophysicist and geodesist, known for his research on Earth's rotation, Earth tides, ocean tides, post-glacial rebound, and other topics in the geosciences.

== Biography ==
Wahr grew up in Midland, Michigan. He graduated in 1973 from the University of Michigan with a B.S. in physics and mathematics. In September 1974 he married Ann Carol Brady. At the University of Colorado Boulder he graduated in physics with an M.S. in 1976 and a Ph.D. in 1979. As a postdoc Wahr was from 1980 to 1982 a visiting scientist in the Geophysical Fluid Dynamics Program of Princeton University's Department of Geological and Geophysical Sciences. In the Department of Physics of the University of Colorado Boulder, he was from 1983 to 1986 an assistant professor, from 1986 to 1992, from 1992 to 2013 a full professor, and from 2013 until his death in 2015 a research professor in semi-retirement. From 1983 to 2015 he held an appointment as a Fellow of the Cooperative Institute for Research in Environmental Sciences at the University of Colorado Boulder. For many years beginning in 1989, he held an appointment as Distinguished Visiting Scientist at the Jet Propulsion Laboratory in Pasadena. His Ph.D. thesis The Tidal Motions of a Rotating, Elliptical, Elastic and Oceanless Earth was supervised by Martin L. Smith.

Wahr's research dealt with applications of satellite geodesy to geophysics and geophysical aspects of hydrology, glaciology, and oceanography. He had important involvement in NASA's satellite mission Gravity Recovery and Climate Experiment (GRACE), as well as the mission Ice, Cloud, and land Elevation Satellite (ICESat) and the mission TOPEX/Poseidon. He and his collaborators used satellite geodesy to investigate ice melting and mass losses in the ice sheets of Greenland and Antarctica and to determine distributions of ocean mass. Several of Wahr's papers have more than 400 citations. He was the author or coauthor of more than 170 scientific publications.

Wahr received in 1983 the International Association of Geodesy's Guy Bomford Prize. The American Geophysical Union (AGU) awarded him in 1985 the James B. Macelwane Medal, elected him in 1985 a Fellow of the AGU, in 1994 appointed him the William Bowie Lecturer, and in 2006 awarded him the Charles A. Whitten Medal. In 1991 he was elected a Fellow of the International Association of Geodesy (IAG). In 2004 the European Geosciences Union (EGU) awarded him the Vening Meinesz Medal. In 2012 he was elected a Member of the National Academy of Sciences.

Wahr's doctoral students include Tonie van Dam.

Upon his death in 2015 from pancreatic cancer, he was survived by his widow Ann and their daughter and son.

== Selected publications ==
- Wahr, John M. (1981). "A normal mode expansion for the forced response of a rotating earth". Geophysical Journal of the Royal Astronomical Society. 64 (3): 651–675. Bibcode:1981GeoJ...64..651W. doi:10.1111/j.1365-246X.1981.tb02689.x.
- Wahr, J. M. (1982). "The effects of the atmosphere and oceans on the Earth's wobble -- I. Theory". Geophysical Journal International. 70 (2): 349–372. Bibcode:1982GeoJ...70..349W. doi:10.1111/j.1365-246X.1982.tb04972.x.
- Carton, J. A.; Wahr, J. M. (1986). "Modelling the pole tide and its effect on the Earth's rotation". Geophysical Journal International. 84: 121–137. Bibcode:1986GeoJ...84..121C. doi:10.1111/j.1365-246X.1986.tb04348.x.
- Wahr, J. M. (1988). "The Earth's Rotation". Annual Review of Earth and Planetary Sciences. 16: 231–249. Bibcode:1988AREPS..16..231W. doi:10.1146/annurev.ea.16.050188.001311. S2CID 54540284.
- De Vries, Dan; Wahr, John M. (1991). "The effects of the solid inner core and nonhydrostatic structure on the Earth's forced nutations and Earth tides". Journal of Geophysical Research: Solid Earth. 96 (B5): 8275–8293. Bibcode:1991JGR....96.8275D. doi:10.1029/90JB01958.
- Trupin, Andrew S.; Meier, Mark F.; Wahr, John M. (1992). "Effect of melting glaciers on the Earth's rotation and gravitational field: 1965-1984". Geophysical Journal International. 108: 1–15. Bibcode:1992GeoJI.108....1T. doi:10.1111/j.1365-246X.1992.tb00835.x.
- Celaya, Michael A.; Wahr, John M.; Bryan, Frank O. (1999). "Climate-driven polar motion". Journal of Geophysical Research: Solid Earth. 104 (B6): 12813–12829. Bibcode:1999JGR...10412813C. doi:10.1029/1999JB900016.
- Jayne, Steven R.; Wahr, John M.; Bryan, Frank O. (2003). "Observing ocean heat content using satellite gravity and altimetry". Journal of Geophysical Research: Oceans. 108 (C2): 3031. Bibcode:2003JGRC..108.3031J. doi:10.1029/2002JC001619.
- Mitrovica, Jerry X.; Wahr, John; Matsuyama, Isamu; Paulson, Archie (2005). "The rotational stability of an ice-age earth". Geophysical Journal International. 161 (2): 491–506. Bibcode:2005GeoJI.161..491M. doi:10.1111/j.1365-246X.2005.02609.x.
- Wahr, J. M.; Zuber, M. T.; Smith, D. E.; Lunine, J. I. (2006). "Tides on Europa, and the thickness of Europa's icy shell" (PDF). Journal of Geophysical Research: Planets. 111 (E12). Bibcode:2006JGRE..11112005W. doi:10.1029/2006JE002729.
- Ashby, Neil; Bender, Peter L.; Wahr, John M. (2007). "Future gravitational physics tests from ranging to the BepiColombo Mercury planetary orbiter". Physical Review D. 75 (2) 022001. Bibcode:2007PhRvD..75b2001A. doi:10.1103/PhysRevD.75.022001.
