= Irwin I. Shapiro =

American astrophysicist

- Born: Irwin Ira Shapiro; 1929 (age 96–97); New York City, New York, U.S.
- Education: Cornell University; Harvard University
- Known for: Shapiro time delay
- Awards: Albert A. Michelson Medal (1975); Dannie Heineman Prize (1983); Brouwer Award (1987); Charles A. Whitten Medal (1991); William Bowie Medal (1993); Albert Einstein Medal (1994); Gerard P. Kuiper Prize (1997); Einstein Prize (2013)
- Scientific career
- Fields: Astrophysics
- Thesis: Methods of Approximation for High Energy Nuclear Scattering (1955)
- Notable students: Thomas A. Herring; Steven J. Ostro; Alyssa A. Goodman

Irwin Ira Shapiro is an American astrophysicist and Timken University Professor at Harvard University. He has been a professor at Harvard since 1982. He was the director of the Center for Astrophysics | Harvard & Smithsonian from 1982 to 2004.

== Career ==
A native of New York, Shapiro graduated from Brooklyn Technical High School in New York City. He later received his B.A. in Mathematics from Cornell University, and later a M.A. and Ph.D in Physics from Harvard University. He joined the Massachusetts Institute of Technology's Lincoln Laboratory in 1954 and became a professor of physics there in 1967. In 1982, he took a position as professor and Guggenheim Fellow at his alma mater, Harvard, and also became director of the Center for Astrophysics | Harvard & Smithsonian. In 1997, he became the first Timken University Professor at the university.

Shapiro's research interests include astrophysics, astrometry, geophysics, gravitation, including the use of gravitational lenses to assess the age of the universe. In 1981, Edward Bowell discovered the 3832 main belt asteroid and it was later named after Shapiro by his former student Steven J. Ostro.

== Recognition ==
=== Honors and awards ===
- Albert A. Michelson Medal from the Franklin Institute (1975)
- Dannie Heineman Prize for Astrophysics from the American Astronomical Society (1983)
- Golden Plate Award of the American Academy of Achievement (1984)
- Brouwer Award from the American Astronomical Society's Division on Dynamical Astronomy (1988)
- Charles A. Whitten Medal from the American Geophysical Union (1991)
- William Bowie Medal from the American Geophysical Union (1993)
- Albert Einstein Medal from the Albert Einstein Society (1994)
- Gerard P. Kuiper Prize from the American Astronomical Society's Division for Planetary Sciences (1997)
- Einstein Prize from the American Physical Society (2013)
- Elected Member of the American Philosophical Society in 1998.
- Elected a Legacy Fellow of the American Astronomical Society in 2020.

=== Eponyms ===
- Shapiro time delay, discovered by Shapiro in 1964
- 3832 Shapiro, asteroid named after Shapiro in 1981
