= Peter Teunissen =

Dutch geodesist (born 1957)

Peter J. G. Teunissen
- Born: 9 October 1957 (age 68); Owerri, Nigeria
- Education: Delft University of Technology
- Known for: LAMBDA method, GNSS ambiguity resolution
- Awards: Vening Meinesz Medal, Johannes Kepler Award, IUGG Honorary Fellow
- Scientific career
- Fields: Geodesy, Satellite Navigation
- Workplaces: Delft University of Technology, Curtin University

Peter J. G. Teunissen (born 9 October 1957) is a Dutch geodesist, known for his contributions to satellite navigation and Earth observation.

He would be recognized for inventing the LAMBDA (Least-squares AMBiguity Decorrelation Adjustment) method, which has become the standard technique for solving integer ambiguities in GNSS carrier‑phase measurements.

== Early life and education ==
Teunissen was born in Owerri, Nigeria, on 9 October 1957. He earned his BSc (1978), MSc (1980, cum laude), and PhD (1985, cum laude) in Mathematical and Physical Geodesy from Delft University of Technology.

== Academic career ==
Teunissen has held several academic and leadership positions at Delft University of Technology (TU Delft), including Head of the Department of Geodesy, Vice-Dean of the Faculty of Civil Engineering and Geosciences, and Director of Education.

He led the Earth Observation and Space Systems Department in the Faculty of Aerospace Engineering and later joined Curtin University in Perth, Australia, where he was the Foundation Head of the GNSS Research Centre and served as Science Director of the Cooperative Research Centre for Spatial Information (2009–2019).

He has also served as Distinguished Visiting Chair Professor at Hong Kong Polytechnic University.

Teunissen is currently emeritus Professor of Geodesy and Satellite Navigation at TU Delft and Vice-President of the International Association of Geodesy. He was the founding Editor-in-Chief of the Journal of Geodesy and serves on several editorial boards.

== Research ==
Teunissen is the originator of the Least-squares AMBiguity Decorrelation Adjustment (LAMBDA) method, a key development in GNSS positioning. His research focuses on satellite navigation, mixed-integer estimation, quality control, and precise positioning with multi-GNSS constellations, including GPS, GLONASS, Galileo, BeiDou, and IRNSS.

He has authored and co-authored numerous publications, including:

- GPS for Geodesy (with A. Kleusberg)
- Adjustment Theory and Testing Theory
- Springer Handbook of Global Navigation Satellite Systems (with O. Montenbruck)

== Awards and honours ==
Teunissen has received multiple international awards, including:

- Vening Meinesz Medal, European Geosciences Union (2022)
- Johannes Kepler Award, Institute of Navigation (2019)
- Honorary Fellow, International Union of Geodesy and Geophysics (IUGG, 2023)
- Member, Royal Netherlands Academy of Arts and Sciences (2000)
- Fellow, Institute of Navigation (2014)
- Fellow, Royal Institute of Navigation (2016)
- Honorary Doctorate, Chinese Academy of Sciences (2014)
- Alexander von Humboldt Research Award

== Selected publications ==
- Teunissen, P.J.G. & Kleusberg, A. (Eds.), GPS for Geodesy, Springer.
- Teunissen, P.J.G. & Montenbruck, O. (Eds.), Springer Handbook of Global Navigation Satellite Systems, Springer.
- Multiple journal articles on GNSS ambiguity resolution, integer estimation, and geodetic theory.

== See also ==
- Sphere_decoding (Lattice_problem)
