= Helmut Moritz =

Austrian geodesist (1933–2022)

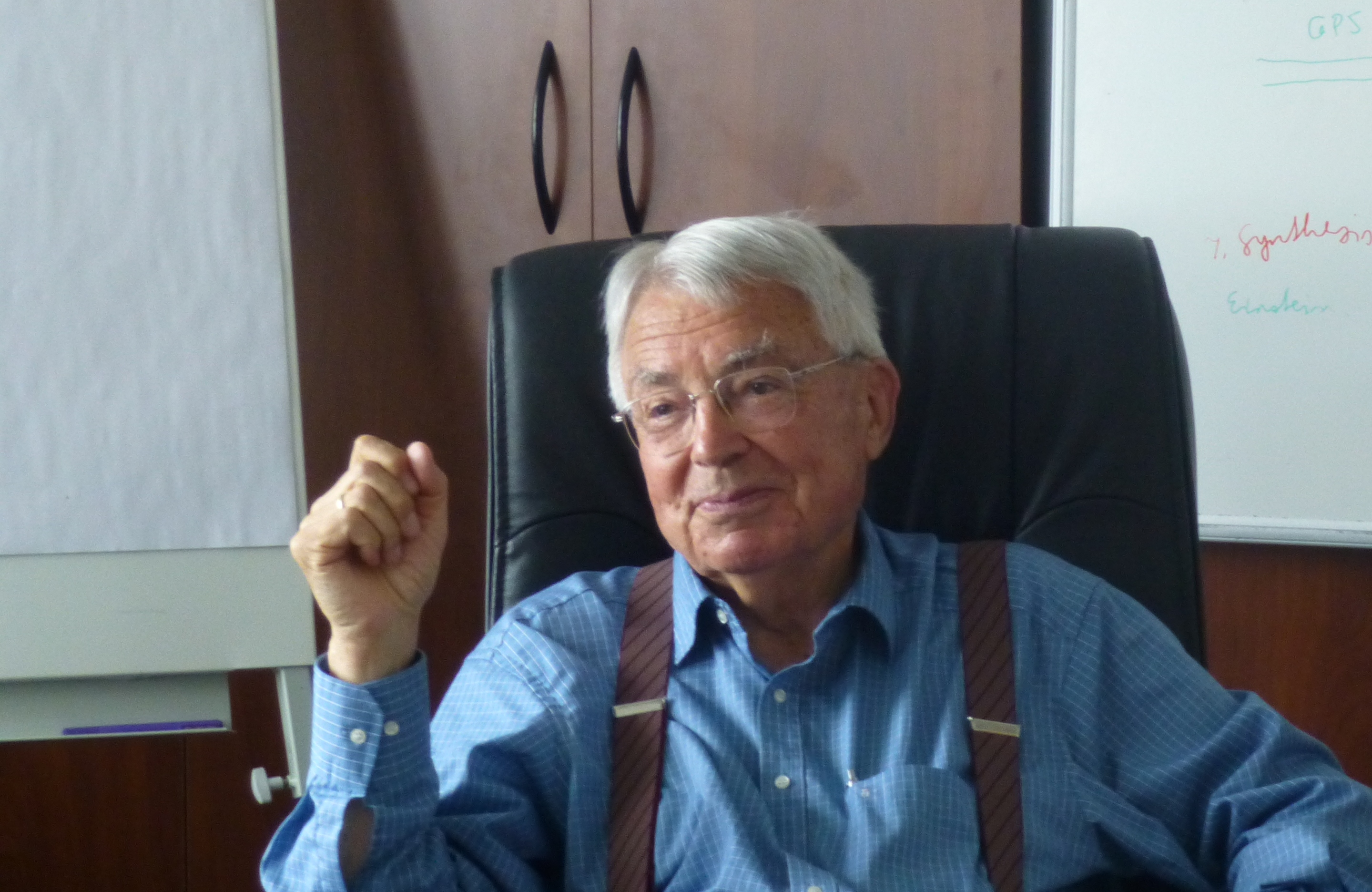
Helmut Moritz, 2012

Helmut Moritz (1 November 1933 – 21 October 2022) was an Austrian physical geodesist. He became internationally known for his fundamental work on error propagation in geodesy. He was a member of the Austrian Academy of Sciences and many other international academies and societies. From 1991 to 1995, he was president of the International Union of Geodesy and Geophysics (IUGG).

== Early life and education ==
Moritz was born in Graz, Austria as the only son of Josef and Karoline Moritz. His father was a calibration officer who was killed in action in France during the Second World War in 1944. Helmut studied geodesy at the Graz University of Technology (TH Graz) from 1951 to 1956, graduating in 1956 with a degree in Surveying. From 1955 to 1958, he worked as a research assistant at the TH Graz; in 1959, he was awarded a Dr. techn. degree by Sub auspiciis Praesidentis. From 1958 to 1964 he was employed in Graz as an official of the Federal Office of Metrology and Surveying (Bundesamt für Eich- und Vermessungswesen, BEV). In 1960, he received his habilitation at the Graz University of Technology.

== Career ==
In 1962, he became a Visiting Research Associate at the Department of Geodetic Science at Ohio State University (OSU) in Columbus, Ohio, US. His research was strongly supported by Professor Weikko A. Heiskanen. Moritz became internationally known for his fundamental work on error propagation in geodesy. He studied publications by the mathematicians and cyberneticists Norbert Wiener and Andrei Nikolayevich Kolmogorov, and expanded his academic teaching in theoretical geodesy. This was later reflected in the book Physical Geodesy, co-authored with Heiskanen; this work was translated from English into Chinese, Serbo-Croatian, Spanish, and Turkish and became a geodetic bestseller. His first research appointment at Ohio State University thus opened up long-term perspectives for Moritz; he remained in professional contact with this university for more than 20 years.

In 1964, he initially returned to the BEV in Graz, and soon after became a private lecturer at the TH Hannover. Here he continued his work on the geodetic boundary value problem of the great Russian geodesist Mikhail Molodenskii for the determination of the Earth's shape from measurements of gravity and gravitational potential. Moritz was appointed Full Professor of Physical Geodesy at Technische Universität Berlin in 1964. In 1971, Moritz received a call to be a full Professor at the Graz University of Technology where he remained until his retirement in 2002.

During his time in Graz, Moritz compiled and carefully structured the mathematical and statistical foundation of collocation in all its facets in his fundamental book Advanced Physical Geodesy (1980). Jointly with Ivan I. Mueller he wrote the volume Earth Rotation: Theory and Observation (1987). His book Geometry, Relativity, and Geodesy (1992), jointly written with Bernhard Hofmann-Wellenhof, may be considered a sort of bridge building, starting from the curved surface, known to every contemporary geodesist, towards the curved space. His book Science, Mind and the Universe (1995) can be understood as a demanding journey into the vast dimensions of our universe, and its reflection in our human mind, enriched by a glimpse into the special and general theories of relativity and quantum physics. And finally, a strong international demand for a revised new edition of his fundamental early book Physical Geodesy, now jointly with B. Hofmann-Wellenhof, closed the circle of his scientific volumes.

In Moritz's career, his international activities played an increasing role. He spoke several foreign languages: English, French, Italian, Polish, Russian, Serbian, Croatian, Slovenian, Spanish, and Czech. His early activities in the German Geodetic Commission led to his election as chairman as early as 1965. He became chairman of a study group of the International Association of Geodesy (IAG) on fundamental Earth constants, which have not only geodetic but also astronomical, geophysical, and geographical significance. Moritz served as president of the IAG during the 1979 to 1983 term. From 1991 to 1995, he was president of the International Union of Geodesy and Geophysics (IUGG).

Moritz received three honorary doctorates: in 1981 from the Technical University of Munich, Germany; in 1992 from the Ohio State University, and in 1994 from the Moscow University of Geodesy, Aerophotogrammetry and Cartography, Moscow, Russia.

He received awards worldwide, including the Carl Friedrich Gauss Medal in 1977 and the Alexander von Humboldt Medal. He was a member of many national and international professional associations and academies of sciences.

== Personal life ==
Helmut has been married since 1959 to Gerlinde Moritz, who died in 2002. The couple has two children, Berta (* 1960) and Albrecht (* 1962), who became biologists and biochemists, respectively. Helmut's fields of private interest covered hiking, languages, German literature, the philosophy of science and the dialogue between science and faith. After a reversion to his faith, Moritz was a practicing Catholic.

Moritz died on 21 October 2022 in Graz.

== Honours and awards ==
- 1963 Kaarina and W. A. Heiskanen Award, Ohio State University
- 1977 Carl-Friedrich-Gauss-Medal, Braunschweig. Sci. Society
- 1983 Alexander-von-Humboldt-Medal, Acad. Sci. Berlin
- 1998 Copernicus-Medal, Polish Acad. Sci.
- 2008 Struve-Medaille, Pulkovo Observatory, Russia
- 2008 Tsiolkovsky-Medal, Moscow
- 1981 Dr.-Ing. h. c. Technical University of Munich
- 1992 DSc. h. c. Ohio State University
- 1994 Dr. h. c. of Geodesy, Aerophotogrammetry and Cartography, Moscow
- 1993 Prof. h. c. Wuhan Technical University of Surveying and Mapping, PR China
- 2014 Order of Friendship, Moscow

The asteroid 29250 Helmutmoritz was named after Moritz.

=== Membership in Academies of Sciences ===
Moritz was a member in the following academies of sciences:

- 1970 Finland
- 1974 Italy / Lincei
- 1976 Austria: corresponding, 1988 full member
- 1983 Hungary: honorary member
- 1984 Sweden / Engineering Sciences
- 1984 Spain
- 1984 Germany (Berlin)
- 1987 Germany / Leopoldina, Halle
- 1988 Poland
- 1992 Academia Europaea / London
- 1994 Croatia
- 1985 Royal Astronomical Society
- 2000 China
- 2001 Yugoslavia / Engineering Sciences

== Publications ==
Moritz's research has resulted in 9 books and over 230 publications.

- Together with Weikko A. Heiskanen: Physical Geodesy. Freeman, San Francisco CA u. a. 1967.
- Advanced Physical Geodesy (Wichmann. Vol. 13). Wichmann u. a., Karlsruhe u. a. 1980, ISBN 3-87907-106-3.
- Together with Ivan I. Mueller: Earth Rotation – Theory and Observation. Ungar, New York 1987, ISBN 0-8044-4671-7.
- Together with Bernhard Hofmann-Wellenhof: Geometry, Relativity, Geodesy. Wichmann, Heidelberg, ISBN 3-87907-244-2
- Science, Mind and the Universe. An Introduction to Natural Philosophy. Wichmann, Heidelberg 1995, ISBN 3-87907-274-4.
- Together with Bernhard Hofmann-Wellenhof: Physical Geodesy (New edition). Springer, Wien u. a. 2005, ISBN 3-211-23584-1.
- Berta Moritz, Helmut Moritz: Über Naturgesetze und Evolution. Ein Beitrag zu einem interdisziplinären Dialog. Verleger: IMABE, Wien 2007, ISBN 978-3-85297-004-2.
