= Sfera (calibration satellite) =

Small passive satellite deployed during a spacewalk from the ISS in August 2012

Sfera (TEKh-44) was a small passive satellite deployed during a spacewalk from the ISS in August 2012.

== Description ==
Also called the Vektor-T calibration sphere, the satellite enables operators to track its movement, generate velocity and acceleration estimates to determine to what extent atmosphere is slowing down the sphere as it travels in space. Drag (velocity deceleration) estimates are used to determine localized atmospheric density.

TEKh-44 is a shiny sphere 53 cm (20.8 inches) across weighing 14 kg (~31 pounds). "Sfera" is Russian for sphere.

== Re-entry ==
It re-entered the atmosphere in late November 2012.

== Sfera-53 2 ==
The second satellite, Sfera-53 2 (TS-530-Zerkalo), was launched on 14 June 2017 09:20 UTC, inside the Progress MS-06 cargo spacecraft on the Soyuz 2.1a carrier rocket from Baikonur Cosmodrome Site 31/6. It was deployed on 17 August 2017 15:29 UTC.

== See also ==
- List of passive satellites
