= Isabella Velicogna =

Geoscientist

- Education: University of Trieste, Italy
- Scientific career
- Workplaces: University of California, Irvine; National Aeronautics and Space Administration

Isabella Velicogna is a geoscientist known for her work using gravity measurements from space to study changes in the polar ice sheets and water storage on Earth.

== Education and career ==
Velicogna has a B.S. and M.S. in physics (1995) and a Ph.D. (1999) from the University of Trieste, Italy. Following her Ph.D. she moved to the University of Colorado, Boulder where she worked from 1999 until 2007. Velicogna started an appointment at the National Aeronautics and Space Administration's Jet Propulsion Laboratory in 2006. At the same time, she joined the faculty at the University of California, Irvine where she was appointed professor in 2006.

Velicogna was one of the contributing authors to "Observations: Cryosphere" in the 2013 report from the Intergovernmental Panel on Climate Change (IPCC AR5 WG1 Ch4 2013). In 2020, she was elected a fellow of the American Geophysical Union who cited her "for groundbreaking research to document and explain the evolution of ice sheets and groundwater resources using gravity remote sensing technologies."

== Research ==
Velicogna developed the use of time series analysis of gravity data from the Gravity Recovery and Climate Experiment (GRACE) satellite to track changes in polar ice sheets and in 2006 she used this metric to quantify the loss of ice in Antarctic. By 2009, her data revealed the rate of ice loss is increasing in both Greenland and Antarctica with large losses of ice in Greenland during the 2019 season. Velicogna and her colleagues use data from the GRACE satellite to track sea level rise which allows global estimates of changes in sea level. Velicogna has also applied time series of gravity data to changes in groundwater storage in different geographic locales including India, Texas, and the Canadian Arctic.

=== Selected publications ===
- Velicogna, I. (2006-03-24). "Measurements of Time-Variable Gravity Show Mass Loss in Antarctica". Science. 311 (5768): 1754–1756. Bibcode:2006Sci...311.1754V. doi:10.1126/science.1123785. ISSN 0036-8075. PMID 16513944. S2CID 6373998.
- Rodell, Matthew; Velicogna, Isabella; Famiglietti, James S. (2009). "Satellite-based estimates of groundwater depletion in India". Nature. 460 (7258): 999–1002. Bibcode:2009Natur.460..999R. doi:10.1038/nature08238. ISSN 0028-0836. PMID 19675570. S2CID 4428681.
- Velicogna, I. (2009). "Increasing rates of ice mass loss from the Greenland and Antarctic ice sheets revealed by GRACE". Geophysical Research Letters. 36 (19). Bibcode:2009GeoRL..3619503V. doi:10.1029/2009GL040222. ISSN 1944-8007.

== Awards and honors ==
- Kavli fellow, National Academy of Sciences (2008, 2014, 2015)
- Vening Meinesz Medal for distinguished research in geodesy, European Geosciences Union (2017)
- Fellow, American Geophysical Union (2020)
- Joanne Simpson Medal for mid-career scientists, American Geophysical Union (2020)
- Fellow, American Association for the Advancement of Science (2021)
- Fellow, American Meteorological Society (2024)

== Sources ==
- Vaughan, D. G.; Comiso, J. C.; Allison, I.; Carrasco, J.; et al. (2013). "Chapter 4: Observations: Cryosphere" (PDF). IPCC AR5 WG1 2013. pp. 317–382.
