= Explorer 24 =

NASA satellite of the Explorer program

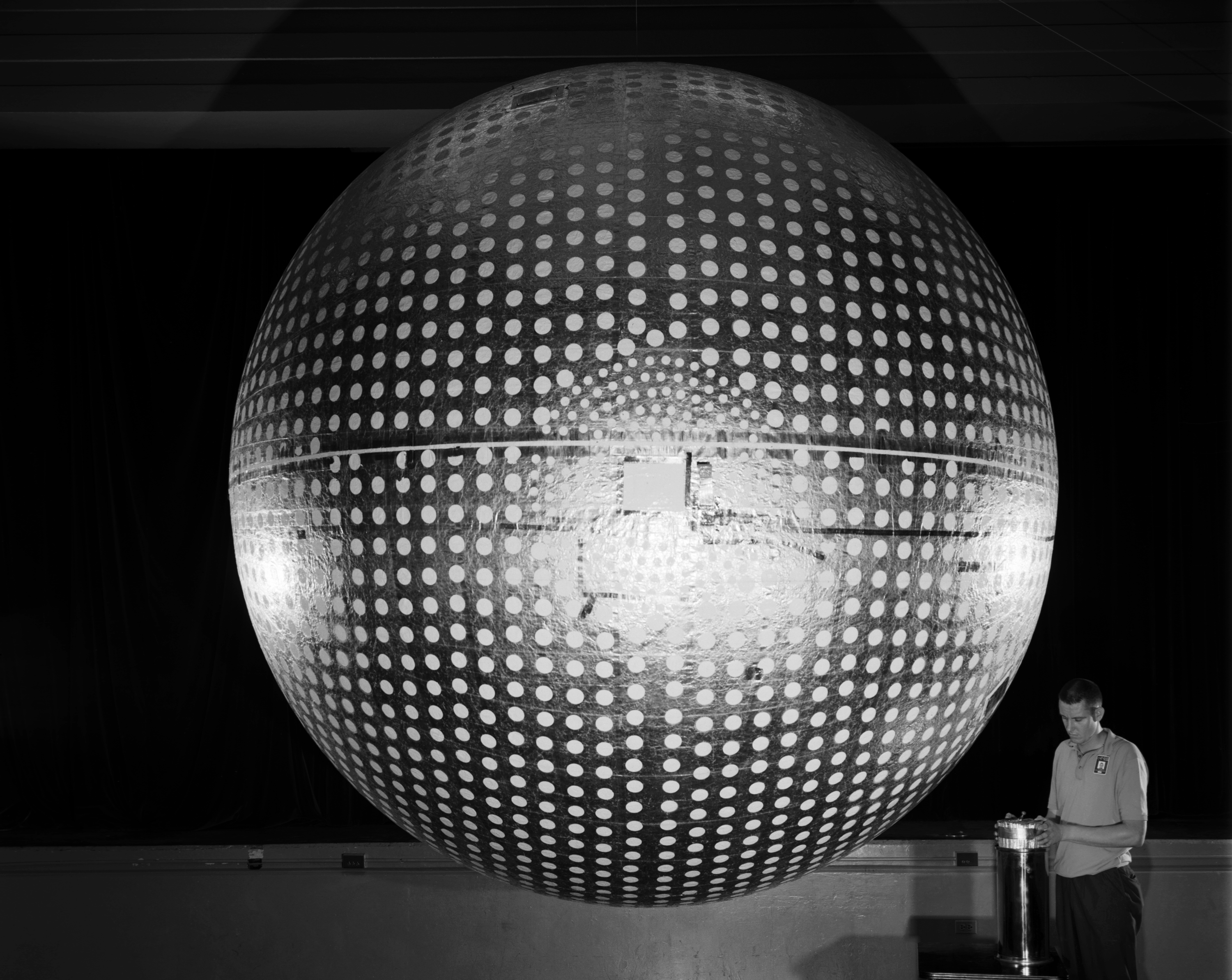
- Explorer 24 satellite
- Names: AD-B; Air Density experiment-B
- Mission type: Air density
- Operator: NASA
- COSPAR ID: 1964-076A
- SATCAT no.: 00931
- Mission duration: 1426 days (achieved)

Spacecraft properties
- Spacecraft: Explorer XXIV
- Spacecraft type: Explorer
- Bus: AD
- Manufacturer: Langley Research Center
- Launch mass: 8.6 kg (19 lb)
- Dimensions: 3.6 m (12 ft) diameter
- Power: Solar cells and rechargeable batteries

Start of mission
- Launch date: 21 November 1964, 17:09:39 GMT
- Rocket: Scout X-4 (S-135R)
- Launch site: Vandenberg, PALC-D
- Contractor: Vought
- Entered service: 21 November 1964

End of mission
- Decay date: 18 October 1968

Orbital parameters
- Reference system: Geocentric orbit
- Regime: Low Earth orbit
- Perigee altitude: 525 km (326 mi)
- Apogee altitude: 2,498 km (1,552 mi)
- Inclination: 81.40°
- Period: 116.30 minutes

Instruments
- Nonsystematic Changes of Air Density; Systematic Changes of Air Density

Explorer 24 (also called AD-B, Air Density experiment-B and S-56C) was a NASA satellite designed for atmospheric studies. Explorer 24 was launched on 21 November 1964 from Vandenberg Air Force Base, Lompoc, California, with a Scout X-4. Explorer 24 was launched along with its successor satellite, Explorer 25.

== Spacecraft ==
Explorer 24 was placed in orbit together with Explorer 25 from a single launch vehicle. Explorer 24 was identical in configuration to the previously launched balloon satellites Explorer 9 and Explorer 19. The spacecraft was 3.6 m (12 ft) in diameter, was built of alternating layers of aluminum foil and plastic film, and was covered uniformly with 5.1 cm (2.0 in) white dots for thermal control. It was designed to yield atmospheric density near perigee as a function of space and time from sequential observations of the sphere's position in orbit. To facilitate ground tracking, the satellite carried a 136-MHz tracking beacon.

== Experiments ==
=== Nonsystematic Changes of Air Density ===
This experiment was designed to determine nonsystematic changes of the density of the upper atmosphere from studies of the drag on a 3.6 m (12 ft) diameter low-density sphere caused by short-term differences in solar activity. Density values near perigee were deduced from sequential observations of the spacecraft position, using optical (Baker-Nunn camera network) and radio and/or radar tracking techniques. This experiment resulted in the successful determination of reasonable density values until spacecraft re-entry.

=== Systematic Changes of Air Density ===
This experiment was designed to determine systematic changes of air density as a function of altitude, latitude, and time of day, by measuring the drag on a 3.6 m (12 ft) diameter low-density sphere with ground tracking.

== Results ==
Explorer 24 helped determine the variation in density between the day and night of the Earth and gave rise to studies on the zone winds in the exosphere, at an altitude of between 450 km (280 mi) and 620 km (390 mi).

The satellite reentered the Earth's atmosphere on 18 October 1968.

== See also ==
- Explorer S-56
- Explorer 9
- Explorer 19
- Explorer program
