= Veikko Aleksanteri Heiskanen =

Finnish geophysicist (1895–1971)

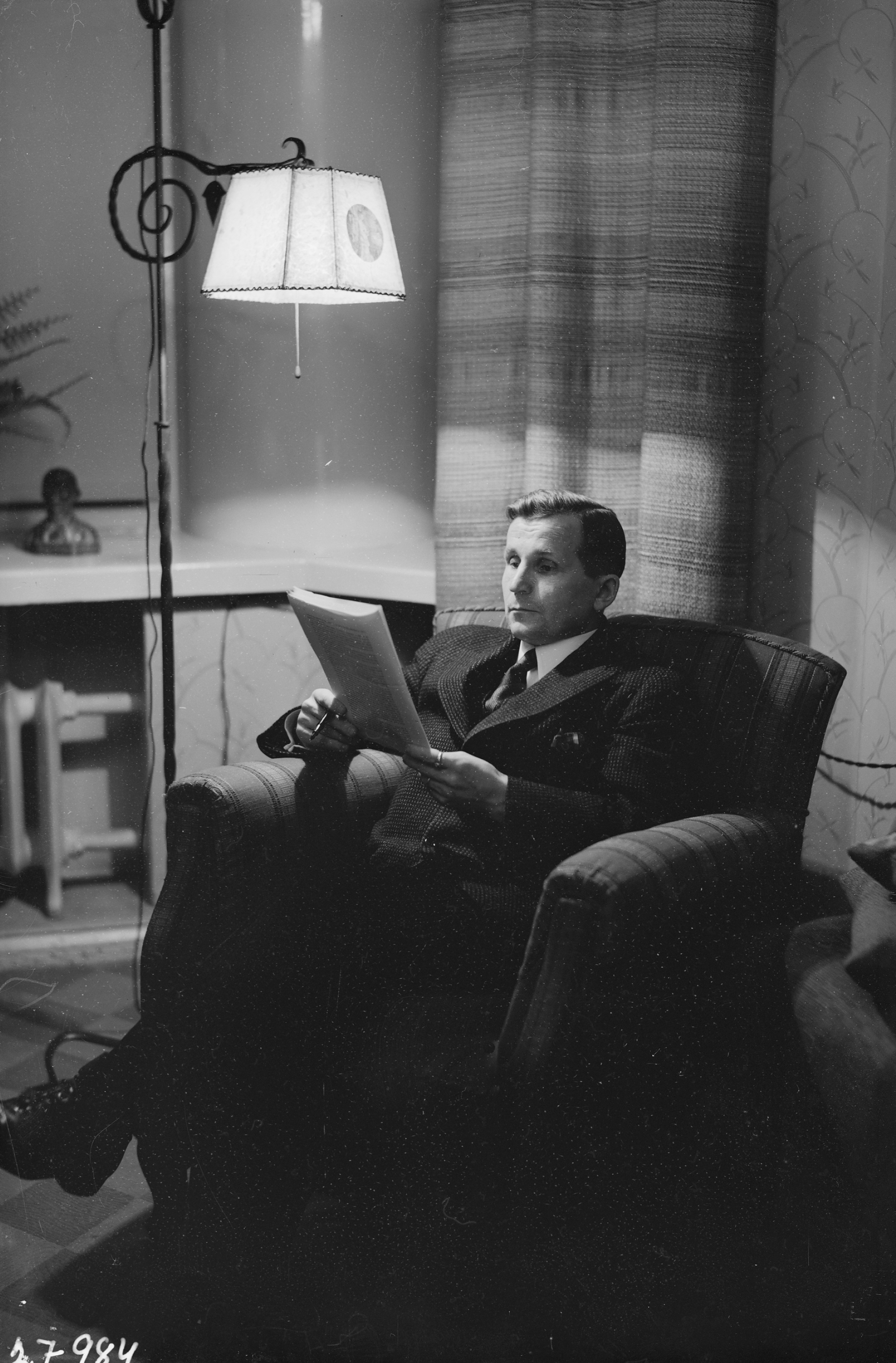
Heiskanen in 1936

Veikko Aleksanteri Heiskanen (V. A. Heiskanen; also spelled Weikko Aleksanteri (or W. A.) Heiskanen; 23 July 1895 – 23 October 1971) was a Finnish geodesist and geophysicist. He was known for his refinement of George Biddell Airy and John Henry Pratt's theories of isostasy into his own, the Heiskanen hypothesis. With Felix Andries Vening Meinesz, he wrote the textbook The Earth and its Gravity Field (1958), and in 1960 a paper by Heiskanen, "The latest achievements of physical geodesy" was discussed in the scientific literature. With Helmut Moritz, Heiskanen wrote the textbook Physical Geodesy (1967), which became a standard text the field of geodesy and for the study of the geoid. Heiskanen's doctoral students include Ivan I. Mueller.

Born c. 23 July 1895 (Note: This is the accepted date in most biographical works.) in Kangaslampi, Finland, he grew up on a small farm. He attended the University of Helsinki and in three years received a Candidate in Philosophy degree (some texts state he received the Master of Science degree). In 1927 he received a Doctor of Philosophy degree from the university.

The Kaarina and Weikko A. Heiskanen Fund endows the Kaarina and Weikko A. Heiskanen Award, which is awarded annually by the Ohio State University. The university hosted the Weikko A. Heiskanen Symposium in Geodesy in 2002 to celebrate that geodesy had been studied at Ohio State for 50 years.

A book, Surveyor of the Globe, was written as a biography of Heiskanen by Juhani A. Kakkuri and published in 2008 and 2017.

== Career chronology ==
- Senior geodesist – Finnish Geodetic Institute (1921–1928)
- Lecturer in geodesy – University of Helsinki (1926–?)
- Professor of geodesy – Finland Institute of Technology (1928–1949)
- Chief of the Geodetic Section – Finland Institute of Technology (1935–1949)
- Director – International Isostatic Institute (1936–?)
- Member – Finnish Parliament (1933–1936)
- Chairman – Finnish Geographical Society (1941–1942)

Source: Nature, 1949.
