= SpaceTuna1 =

Japanese satellite launched in 2022

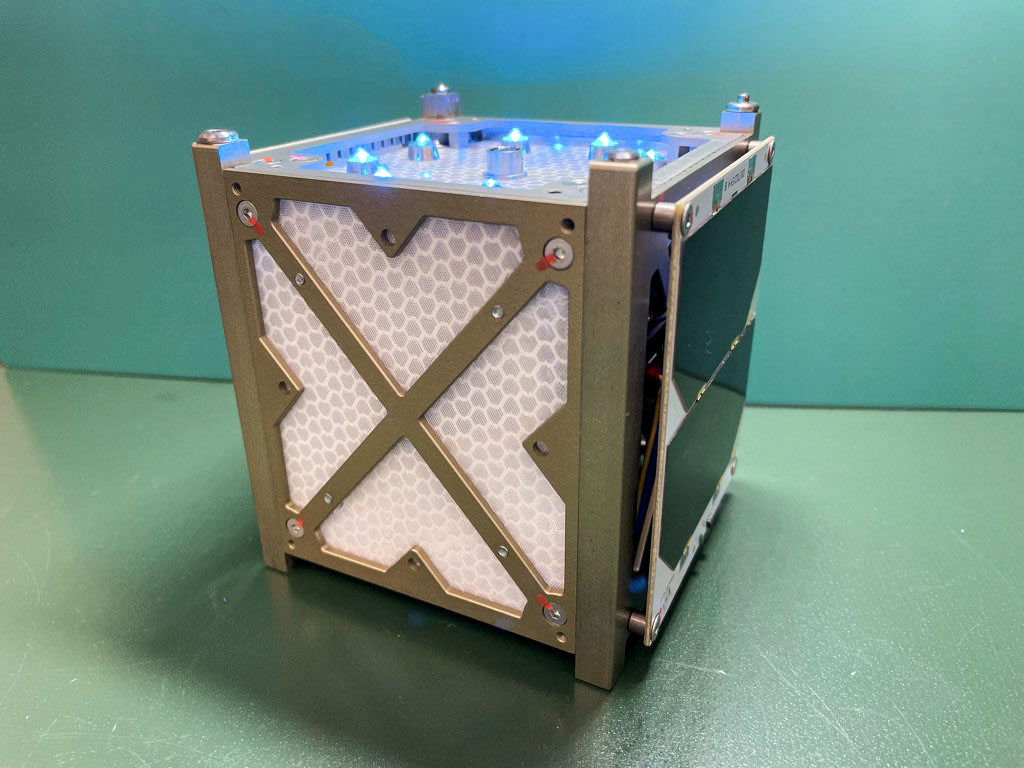
- The SpaceTuna1 CubeSat prior to launch
- Mission type: Technology demonstration
- Operator: Kindai University

Spacecraft properties
- Spacecraft type: CubeSat

Start of mission
- Launch date: 7 November 2022, 10:42:32 UTC
- Rocket: Antares 230+
- Launch site: MARS, Pad 0A
- Deployed from: ISS Kibō; Delivered by Cygnus NG-18
- Deployment date: 2 December 2022

Orbital parameters
- Reference system: Geocentric
- Regime: Low Earth
- Inclination: 51.6°

SpaceTuna1 is a nanosatellite developed by Kindai University to test the properties of reflective materials in space.The project aims to use this technology to monitor tunas as an alternative to the use of tags for biologging. SpaceTuna1 has been launched from Wallops Flight Facility on board a Cygnus spacecraft on 7 November 2022, and will later be deployed from the International Space Station (ISS).

== Overview ==
SpaceTuna1 was jointly developed by Kindai University, EXEDY Corporation and Nippon Carbide Industries. The spacecraft is a 10 cm size cube, or a 1U size CubeSat. The satellite frame was developed by EXEDY Corporation.

The project started from 2016, and is the first satellite developed by Kindai University. Kindai University is known in Japan for its extensive research on farming bluefin tuna, with the school earning the nickname 'tuna university'.

The retroreflective sheet had reflection properties optimised for the experiment. The plan was to fire a laser from the ground at the satellite, in orbit about 400 km above the Earth, and measure how strong a reflection could be observed by telescope, giving basic data for the future tuna-tracking idea. The laser was to be fired from a large telescope at the optical ground station of NICT's space communication systems laboratory, which cooperates with Kindai University on joint research, and the reflected light was to be observed with the telescope's receiver. The CubeSat also carried blue LEDs so that it could be seen through ground telescopes.

== Mission ==
Ecological survey of bluefin tuna is typically conducted by attaching a tag to the fish which will then take records of its position. The usefulness of the tags are limited by its battery life, and data cannot be gained in actual time but only after the tag is recovered. Furthermore attaching the tag can put a strain on the tuna as it necessitates processes such as laparotomy or attaching the tag to the fish's spine using a wire. Kindai University is proposing an alternative to the tags, a reflective sheet that can be attached to the fish. The movement of the tunas will be monitored from space by using a satellite equipped with a laser to irradiate the sheets. SpaceTuna1 will be used to test if the sheets can be observed from 300 km away.

While in orbit, SpaceTuna1 will be irradiated with a laser sent from the ground. The spacecraft is covered with a retroreflector sheet, and ground-based receivers will measure the reflected light. An optical ground station operated by Japan's National Institute of Information and Communications Technology (NICT) capable of tracking satellites will be used to irradiate SpaceTuna1. Observations will be conducted for over a year to monitor how the sheet deteriorates in space. The sheet was developed by Kindai University and Nippon Carbide Industries.

On one side of the CubeSat light-emitting diodes (LEDs) are attached so that ground-based telescoped can optically detect its position in orbit.
