= Journal of Geodynamics =

- Language: English

Publication details
- Publisher: Elsevier

Standard abbreviations
- ISO 4: J. Geodyn.

Indexing
- ISSN: 0264-3707 (print); 1879-1670 (web)

Journal of Geodynamics is an academic journal published by Elsevier about geodynamics.

From the journal scope description: "The Journal of Geodynamics is an international and interdisciplinary forum for the publication of results and discussions of Solid Earth research covering the entire multitude of scientific methods aimed at understanding deep and shallow processes in various tectonic settings and acting at different time- and length-scales. The Journal publishes results based on a multitude of research disciplines, including geophysics, geodesy, geochemistry, geology, and based on field observations, laboratory experiments, and numerical simulations".

Journal editor-in-chief is Irina M. Artemieva (2016-2025).

Founding editor: A.L. Hales (Australia), 1984

Previous editors-in-chief:

- Wolfgang Jacoby (Germany)

- Randell Stephenson (the Netherlands)

- Wouter Schellart (Australia)

Journal metrics in 2024:

Impact Factor = 2.1,

CiteScore = 4.0.
