= Explorer 9 =

NASA satellite of the Explorer program

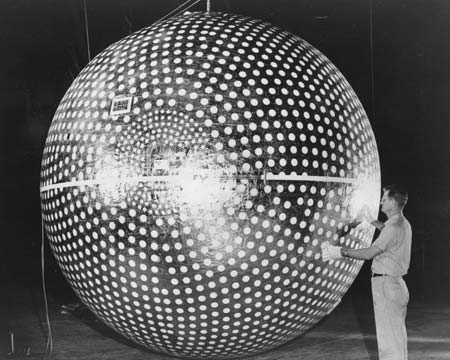
- Explorer 9 before launch
- Names: S-56A; Explorer IX; NASA S-56A
- Mission type: Air density research
- Operator: NASA
- Harvard designation: 1961 Delta 1
- COSPAR ID: 1961-004A
- SATCAT no.: 00081
- Mission duration: 3 years (achieved)

Spacecraft properties
- Spacecraft: Explorer IX
- Spacecraft type: Air Density Explorer
- Bus: S-56
- Manufacturer: Langley Research Center
- Launch mass: 7 kg (15 lb)
- Dimensions: 3.66 m (12.0 ft) diameter
- Power: solar cells and rechargeable batteries

Start of mission
- Launch date: 16 February 1961, 13:05:00 GMT
- Rocket: Scout X-1 (ST-4)
- Launch site: Wallops Flight Facility, LA-3
- Contractor: Vought
- Entered service: 16 February 1961

End of mission
- Decay date: 9 April 1964

Orbital parameters
- Reference system: Geocentric orbit
- Regime: Medium Earth orbit
- Perigee altitude: 545 km (339 mi)
- Apogee altitude: 2,225 km (1,383 mi)
- Inclination: 38.91°
- Period: 118.6 minutes

Instruments
- Satellite Drag Atmospheric Density

Explorer 9, known as S-56A before launch, was a NASA satellite which was launched in February 1961 to study the density and composition of the upper thermosphere and lower exosphere. It was a reflight of the failed Explorer S-56 mission, and consisted of a 7 kg (15 lb), 3.66 m (12.0 ft) balloon which was deployed into a medium Earth orbit. The mission was conducted by NASA's Langley Research Center.

== Spacecraft ==
The spacecraft consisted of alternating layers of aluminium foil and Mylar polyester film. Uniformly distributed over the aluminium surface were 5.1 cm (2.0 in)-diameter dots of white paint for thermal control. The sphere was packed in a tube 21.6 cm (8.5 in) in diameter and 48.3 cm (19.0 in) long and mounted in the nose of the fourth stage of its Scout X-1 launch vehicle.

== Experiment ==
=== Satellite Drag Atmospheric Density ===
Because of its symmetrical shape, Explorer 9 was selected for use in determining upper atmospheric densities as a function of altitude, latitude, season, and solar activity. Density values near perigee were deduced from sequential observations of the spacecraft position, using optical (Baker-Nunn camera network) and radar tracking techniques. A good discussion of the general techniques used to deduce density values from satellite drag data can be found in L. G. Jacchia and J. Slowey, "Accurate drag determination for eight artificial satellites of atmospheric densities and temperatures", Smithsonian Astrophysical Observatory special report n. 100, Cambridge, Massachusetts, July 1962. This experiment resulted in the successful determination of reasonable density values until the satellite reentered the Earth's atmosphere on 9 April 1964.

== Launch ==
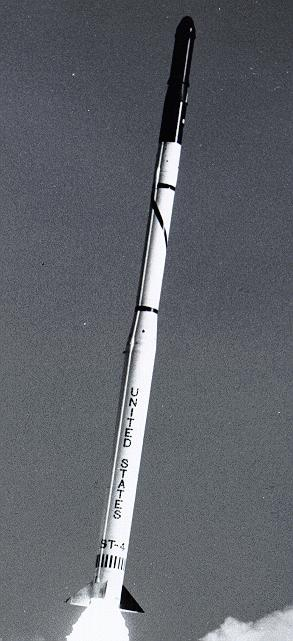
Launch of Explorer 9 on a Scout X-1 (ST-4) on 16 February 1961.

Explorer 9 was launched from Launch Area 3 at the Wallops Flight Facility (WFF), atop a Scout X-1 launch vehicle with the serial number ST-4. It was the first spacecraft launched from Wallops Island to achieve orbit, with one previous attempt having failed. The launch occurred at 13:05:00 GMT on 16 February 1961, and resulted in Explorer 9 being deployed into an orbit with an apogee of 2,225 km (1,383 mi), a perigee of 545 km (339 mi), 38.91° of inclination and a period of 118.6 minutes. It was assigned the Harvard designation 1961 Delta 1.

Upon separation of the fourth stage, the sphere was inflated by a nitrogen gas bottle, and a separation spring ejected it out into its own orbit. The two hemispheres of aluminium foil were separated with a gap of Mylar at the spacecraft's equator and served as the antenna. A 136 MHz, 15 mW beacon was carried for tracking purposes, but the beacon failed on the first orbit and the SAO Baker-Nunn camera network had to be relied upon for tracking. Power was supplied by solar cells and rechargeable batteries.

The second of six identical air density research satellites to be launched, Explorer 9 was the first to successfully reach orbit. It was still operational when the next satellite in the series, Explorer 19, was launched, allowing simultaneous readings to be taken and compared.

== Mission results ==
Careful and continuous photographic observation of the satellite allowed scientists to conduct an unprecedented survey of the Earth's exosphere. The satellite first confirmed the daily bulge in the upper atmosphere caused by the Sun's heating the air during the day and verified the model of exospheric temperature developed according to other satellite data. It was later discovered that the temperature of the exosphere increased after geomagnetic disturbances in the ionosphere, peaking around five hours after each event. With three years of data, scientists were able to discern a seasonal variation to the exosphere's density, with an increase of 25% observed in winter over summer at a reference latitude of 39°. The delay in the temperature increase resulting from magnetic disturbances was further refined to 5.2 ± 0.4 hours.

Explorer 9 was the first spacecraft placed in orbit by an all-solid launch vehicle and the first spacecraft successfully launched into orbit from Wallops Island. The spacecraft reentered the Earth's atmosphere on 9 April 1964.

== Legacy ==
A replica of the spacecraft, possibly a flight backup, is currently located in the Smithsonian Institution's National Air and Space Museum, although it is not on display.

== See also ==
- Explorer S-56
- Explorer program
