= Explorer S-56 (satellite) =

American air density research satellite launched in 1960

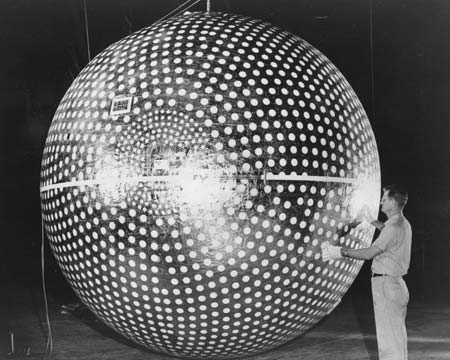
- The identical Explorer 9 satellite
- Names: NASA S-56
- Mission type: Air density research
- Operator: NASA
- COSPAR ID: EXS-56
- Mission duration: Failed to orbit

Spacecraft properties
- Spacecraft: Explorer S-56
- Spacecraft type: Air Density Explorer
- Bus: S-56
- Manufacturer: Langley Research Center
- Launch mass: 7 kg (15 lb)
- Dimensions: 3.66 m (12.0 ft) diameter
- Power: solar cells and rechargeable batteries

Start of mission
- Launch date: 4 December 1960, 21:14 GMT
- Rocket: Scout X-1 (ST-3)
- Launch site: Wallops Flight Facility, LA-3
- Contractor: Vought

End of mission
- Destroyed: Failed to reach orbit

Orbital parameters
- Reference system: Geocentric orbit (planned)
- Regime: Medium Earth orbit
- Perigee altitude: 545 km (339 mi)
- Apogee altitude: 2,225 km (1,383 mi)
- Inclination: 38.91°
- Period: 118.6 minutes

Explorer S-56 was a NASA satellite launched on 4 December 1960, at 21:14 GMT as part of the Explorer program. The satellite was composed of a 3.66 m (12.0 ft) diameter inflatable sphere, and was intended to study the density of the upper atmosphere. The Scout X-1 rocket used to launch Explorer S-56 failed in flight, and the satellite never reached orbit.

== Spacecraft design ==
The spacecraft consisted of alternating layers of aluminium foil and Mylar polyester film. Uniformly distributed over the aluminium surface were 5.1 cm (2.0 in)-diameter dots of white paint for thermal control. The sphere was packed in a tube 21.6 cm (8.5 in) in diameter and 48.3 cm (19.0 in) long and mounted in the nose of the fourth stage of its Scout X-1 launch vehicle.

Upon separation of the fourth stage, the sphere will be inflated by a nitrogen gas bottle, and a separation spring will eject it out into its own orbit. The two hemispheres of aluminium foil will be separated with a gap of Mylar at the spacecraft's equator and will serve as the antenna. A 136 MHz, 15 mW beacon will be carried for tracking purposes, the beacon and the SAO Baker-Nunn camera network will be relied upon for tracking. Power will be supplied by solar cells and rechargeable batteries.

== Launch ==
Explorer S-56 was launched, at 21:14 GMT on 4 December 1960, from Launch Area 3 at the Wallops Flight Facility (WFF), atop a Scout X-1 launch vehicle with the serial number ST-3. It was the first attempt to place a satellite in orbit using an all-solid propellant launch vehicle and the first orbital attempt made from NASA's Wallops Island facility. It was the first spacecraft launched from Wallops Island, but failed to reach orbit due to the second stage not igniting and impacting in the Atlantic Ocean, at 130 km (81 mi) at east of Wallops Island. It was replaced by the identical Explorer 9 (1961-004A) spacecraft.

The first of six identical air density research satellites to be launched.

== See also ==
- Explorer 9
- Explorer program
