= PAGEOS =

Passive geodetic satellite launched by NASA in 1966

Passive Geodetic Earth Orbiting Satellite (PAGEOS)
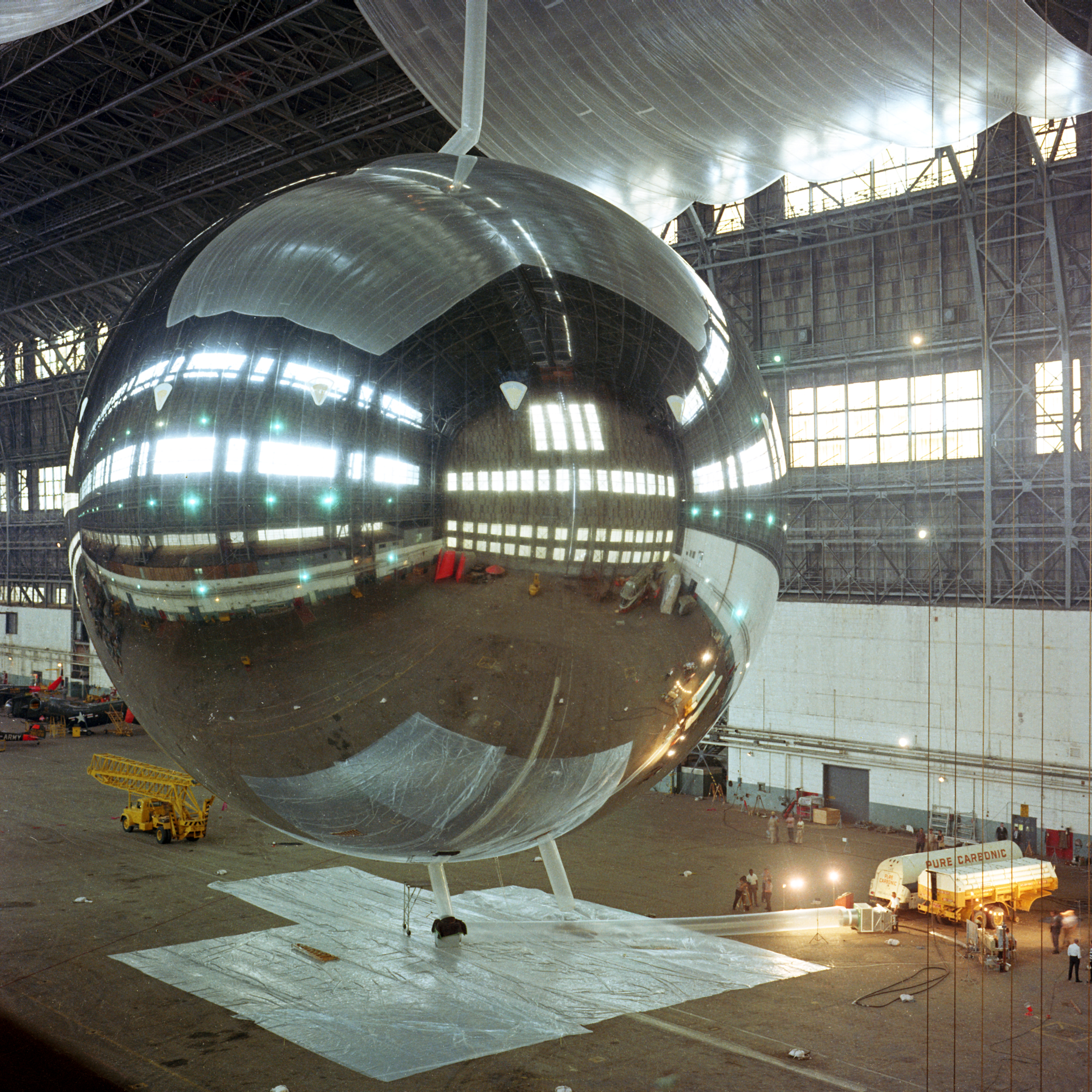
- Test inflation of PAGEOS, 5 August 1965
- Names: PAGEOS-A
- Operator: NASA Office of Space Applications
- COSPAR ID: 1966-056A
- SATCAT no.: 02253

Spacecraft properties
- Launch mass: 56.7 kg (125 lb)
- Dimensions: 30.48 m (100.0 ft) diameter

Start of mission
- Launch date: 00:14, June 24, 1966 (UTC)
- Rocket: Thrust augmented Thor-Agena D
- Launch site: Vandenberg AFB

End of mission
- Destroyed: partially disintegrated July 1975

Orbital parameters
- Reference system: Geocentric
- Eccentricity: 0.00301
- Perigee altitude: 4,207 km (2,614 mi)
- Apogee altitude: 4,271 km (2,654 mi)
- Inclination: 87.14°
- Period: 181.43 min
- Epoch: 24 June 1966

PAGEOS (PAssive Geodetic Earth Orbiting Satellite) was a balloon satellite which was launched by NASA in June 1966. It was the first satellite specifically launched for use in geodetic surveying, or measuring the shape of the earth, by serving as a reflective and photographic tracking target. At the time, it improved on terrestrial triangulations of the globe by about an order of magnitude. The satellite, which carried no instrumentation, broke up between 1975 and 1976. One of the largest fragments of the satellite finally deorbited in 2016.

PAGEOS was part of a larger program of inflatable satellites that grew from the original concept by William J. O'Sullivan of a 30-inch diameter inflatable satellite in 1956 to measure air drag at high altitudes, called the Sub-Satellite. While the Sub-Satellite failed, the idea of a visible US satellite became very attractive after Sputnik launched in the Cold War, resulting in a program of similar, larger satellites. These included satellites Echo 1 and Echo 2 under Project Echo, which were also used for experiments in geodetic surveying; several air-density-focused Explorer satellites; and finally PAGEOS.

== Design ==
PAGEOS had a diameter of exactly 100 feet (30.48 m), consisted of a 0.5 mils (12.7 μm) thick mylar plastic film coated with vapour deposited aluminum enclosing a volume of about 524,000 cubic feet (14,800 m^{3}) The metal coating both reflected sunlight and protected the satellite from damaging ultraviolet waves. The satellite was launched in a canister, which explosively separated as it was ejected from the rocket. Then, the balloon was inflated through a combination of residual internal air and a mixture of benzoic acid and anthraquinone placed inside, which turned to gas when the satellite was exposed to the heat of the sun. The satellite carried no instrumentation. The study and construction of PAGEOS was done by the Schjeldahl company, which also made Echo 1.

== Usage ==
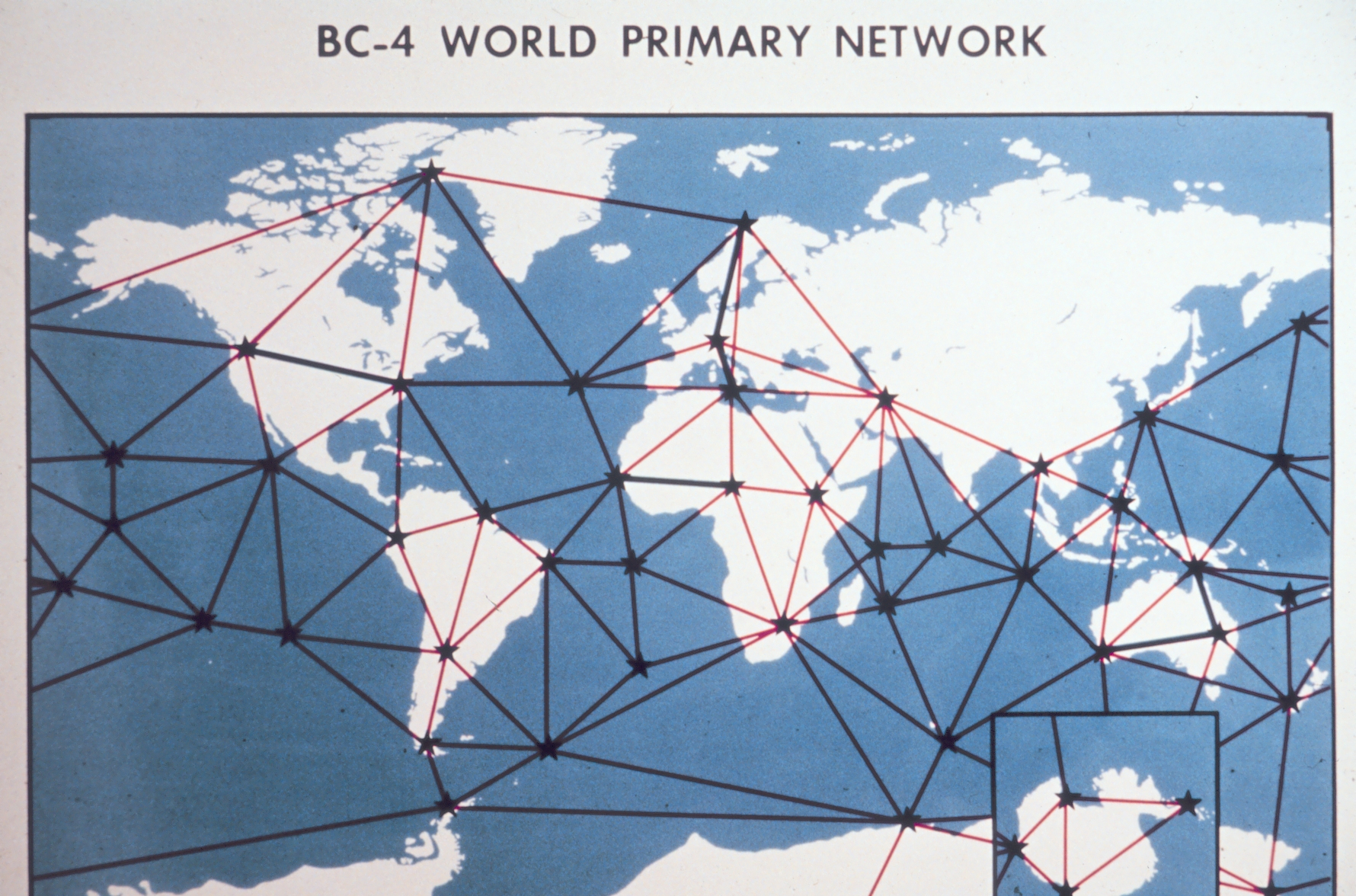
Network of BC4 cameras used to establish the Worldwide Geometric Satellite Triangulation Network

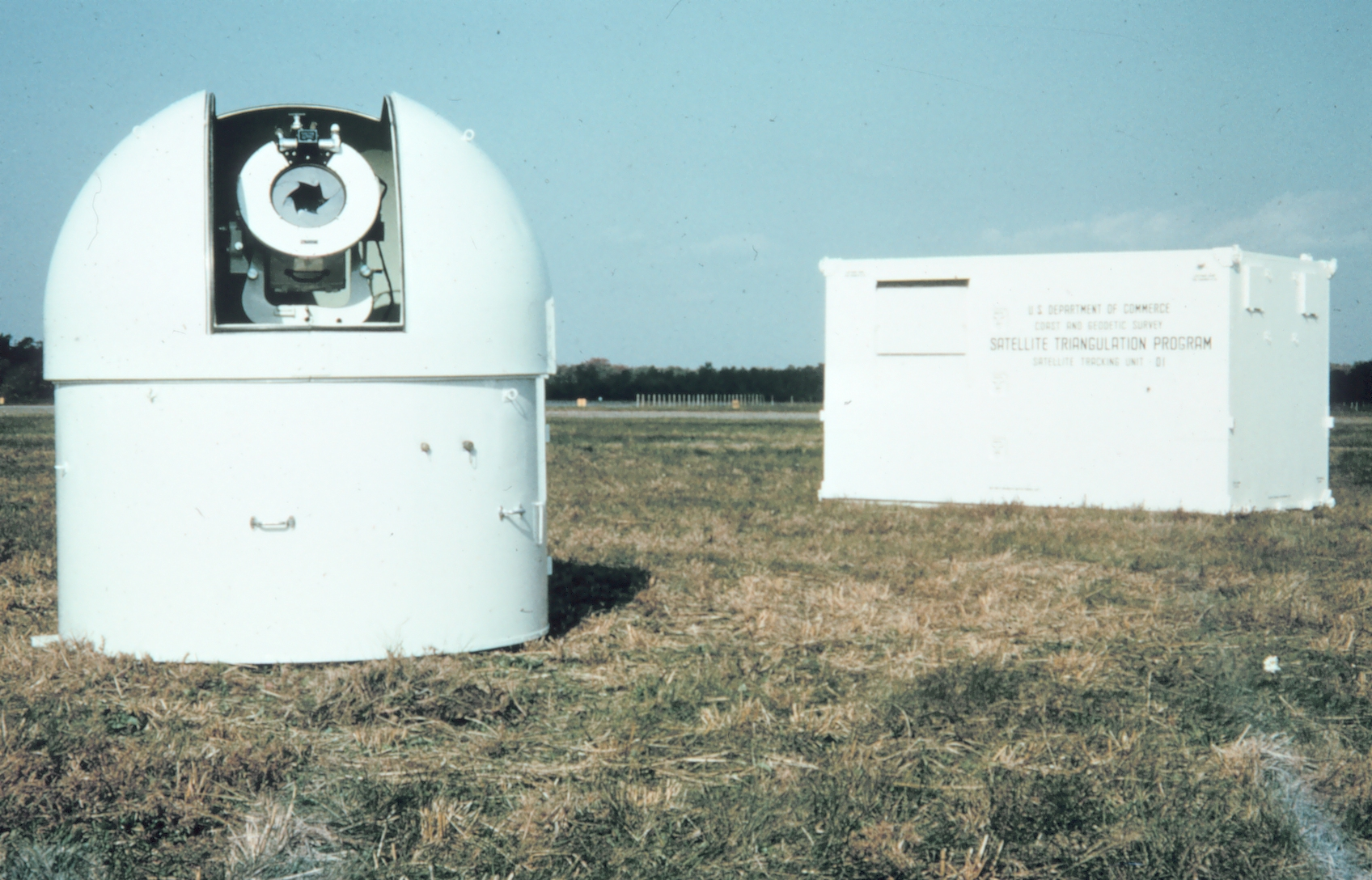
A BC4 (Ballistic Camera-4) camera, inside its observing dome, with instrumentation shelter in background.

PAGEOS was placed into a polar orbit, about 200 nautical miles above the earth, so that the U.S. Coastal and Geodetic Survey could practically apply triangulation techniques developed from experiments with Echo 1. This program was known as the "Worldwide Geometric Satellite Triangulation Program". Because of the satellite's high altitude, the sun illuminated it during the entirety of Earth night, allowing it to be picked out from a background of stars. Over five years, 16 groups conducted observations at 45 globally distributed stations, about 3000-4000 km apart from each other. 12 mobile tracking stations were used, which observed during favorable weather conditions during a few minutes of twilight each evening. BC4 cameras were used to photograph the satellite. Observations were taken when the satellite was visible simultaneously to multiple stations at the same time. This resulted in the fixing of the precise locations of 38 different points around the world. This could be used to help determine the precise locations of the continents relative to each other, and to help determine the precise shape and size of the earth. Some unclassified data was used by scientists studying continental drift, and more classified data was used by US military planners studying intercontinental ballistic missiles. The observations were done with BC4 (Ballistic Camera-4) cameras, and could last more than a year at each station before satisfactory results were obtained. The network reached an accuracy about an order of magnitude better than terrestrial triangulations at the time, and was the first time that a scientific determination had been made with accuracy of a complete global polyhedron.

== Orbit ==
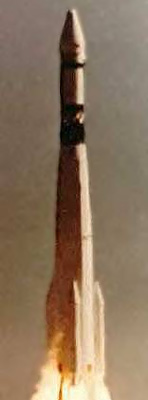
Thor-SLV2A Agena-D launching PAGEOS

The PAGEOS spacecraft was launched by a Thor-SLV2A Agena-D (Thor 473) on June 24, 1966, and placed into a polar orbit (inclination 85–86°) with an initial height of 4200km, which had gradually lowered during its 9 years of operation. The satellite first partly disintegrated in July 1975, which was followed by a second break-up that occurred in January 1976 resulting in the release of a large number of fragments. Most of these re-entered during the following decade. In 2016, one of the largest fragments of PAGEOS de-orbited.

The satellite's orbital period was approximately three hours. It was about as bright as Polaris, and appeared as a slow-moving star. Thanks to its high orbit and its polar inclination, it did not pass through the Earth's shadow and was visible any time of night, unlike lower-orbit satellites which had to be viewed exclusively just before sunrise and after sunset. Its high orbit also allowed it to be seen simultaneously by observers 2000-3000 km apart at optimum distances from the zenith.

== See also ==
- List of passive satellites
- Reference ellipsoid
- World Geodetic System (WGS84)
