= Journal of Geodesy =

- Discipline: Geodesy
- Language: English
- Edited by: Peiliang Xu

Publication details
- Former names: Bulletin Géodésique; manuscripta geodaetica
- Publisher: Springer (Germany)
- Frequency: monthly

Standard abbreviations
- ISO 4: J. Geod.

Indexing
- ISSN: 0949-7714 (print); 1432-1394 (web)
- LCCN: 97646987

The Journal of Geodesy is an academic journal about geodesy published by Springer on behalf of the International Association of Geodesy (IAG). It is the merger and continuation of Bulletin Géodésique and manuscripta geodaetica (both published 1976–1995).

This journal has an impact factor of 4.528 (2018).
