= Explorer 34 =

NASA satellite of the Explorer program

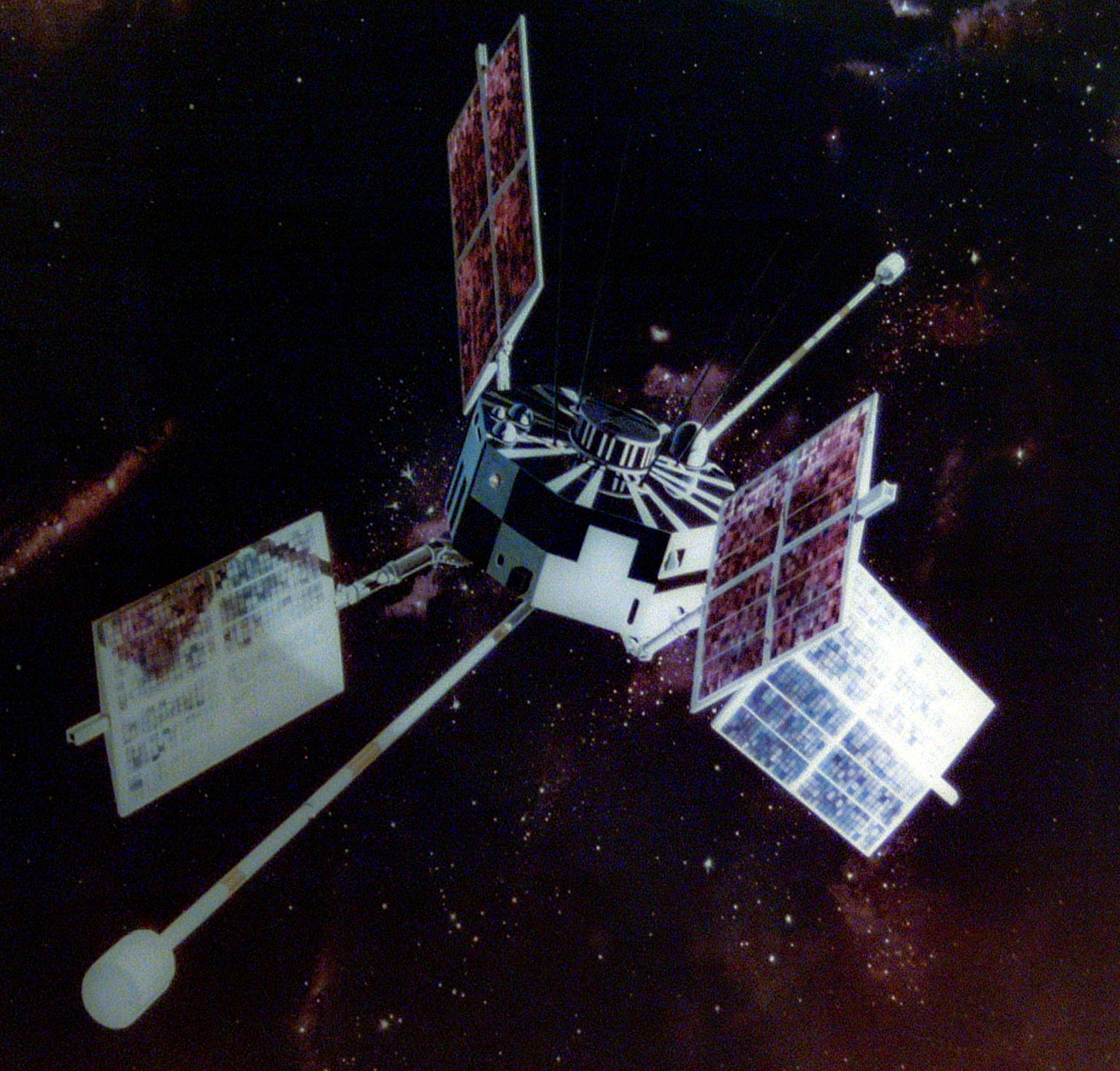
- Explorer 34 satellite
- Names: IMP-F; IMP-4; Interplanetary Monitoring Platform-4
- Mission type: Space physics
- Operator: NASA
- COSPAR ID: 1967-051A
- SATCAT no.: 02817
- Mission duration: 2 years (achieved)

Spacecraft properties
- Spacecraft: Explorer XXXIV
- Spacecraft type: Interplanetary Monitoring Platform
- Bus: IMP
- Manufacturer: Goddard Space Flight Center
- Launch mass: 163 kg (359 lb)
- Dimensions: 71 × 20.3 cm (28.0 × 8.0 in)
- Power: 4 deployable solar arrays and batteries

Start of mission
- Launch date: 24 May 1967, 14:05:54 GMT
- Rocket: Delta E1 (Thor 486 / Delta 049)
- Launch site: Vandenberg, SLC-2E
- Entered service: 24 May 1967

End of mission
- Last contact: 3 May 1969
- Decay date: 3 May 1969

Orbital parameters
- Reference system: Geocentric orbit
- Regime: Highly elliptical orbit
- Perigee altitude: 2,031 km (1,262 mi)
- Apogee altitude: 209,242 km (130,017 mi)
- Inclination: 68.50°
- Period: 6218.30 minutes

Instruments
Instruments
- Cosmic-Ray Anisotropy
- Cosmic-Ray Energy versus Energy Loss
- Cosmic-Ray Proton (R versus DE/DX)
- Electrostatic Analyzer
- Ion Chamber
- Low-Energy Proton and Alpha Detector
- Low-Energy Proton and Electron Differential Energy Analyzer (LEPEDEA)
- Low-Energy Solid-State Telescope
- Solar Proton Monitoring Experiment
- Spherical Electrostatic Analyzer
- Triaxial Fluxgate Magnetometer

Explorer 34 (IMP-F, IMP-4), was a NASA satellite launched as part of Explorer program. Explorer 34 as launched on 24 May 1967 from Vandenberg Air Force Base, California, with Thor-Delta E1 launch vehicle. Explorer 34 was the fifth satellite launched as part of the Interplanetary Monitoring Platform program, but was known as "IMP-4" because the preceding launch was more specifically part of the "Anchored IMP" sub-program. The spacecraft was put into space between the launches of Explorer 33 (IMP-D / AIMP-1) in 1966 and Explorer 35 (IMP-E / AIMP-2) in July 1967, but the next satellite to use Explorer 34's general design was Explorer 41 (IMP-G / IMP-5), which flew in 1969.

== Launch ==
Explorer 34 was placed into a high-inclination, highly elliptical orbit. The apogee point was located near the ecliptic plane and had an initial local time of about 19:00 hours. The spacecraft was spin-stabilized and had an initial spin period of 2.6-seconds. The spin vector was approximately perpendicular to the ecliptic plane. Like the earlier IMPs, this spacecraft was instrumented to study interplanetary magnetic fields, energetic particles, and plasma.

== Experiments ==
=== Cosmic-Ray Anisotropy ===
This experiment was designed to study solar particle anisotropy and its variation with time. A telescope, consisting of three aligned detectors -- (A) solid state, (B) plastic scintillator, and (C) Caesium iodide (CsI) scintillator—and a plastic scintillator anticoincidence shield (D), were used to measure protons from 0.8 to 7.0 MeV—counts in (A) but not in (B) -- and from 35 to 110 MeV—coincident counts in (B), measuring dE/dx, and (C), measuring total energy, but not in (D). Pulse-height analysis yielded six-point spectra within each of these two energy intervals. Protons from 7 to 55 MeV—counts in (A) and (B) -- were also recorded without spectral information. In addition, a proportional counter provided directional measurements of X-rays with energies above 2 keV and electrons above 70 keV. Counts in each particle-counting mode were obtained in each of eight octants in the ecliptic plane. X-ray counts were obtained in the solar octant. A complete set of count rates and spectral data was obtained every 81.9-seconds.

=== Cosmic-Ray Energy versus Energy Loss ===
This experiment used a dE/dx vs E telescope with thin and thick Caesium iodide (CsI) scintillators (one each) and an anticoincidence plastic scintillation counter. The telescope axis was parallel to the spacecraft spin axis. Counts of particles penetrating the thin CsI scintillator and stopping in the thick CsI scintillator were accumulated for a 4.48-seconds interval twice every 2.73 minutes. The relative contribution to the count rate of various species (electrons between 2.7 and 21.5 MeV, nuclei with charge 1 and 2, atomic mass 1, 2, 3, and 4, and energy between 18.7 and 81.6 MeV/nucleon) and energy spectral information were determined by 1024-channel pulse-height analysis performed simultaneously on the output of both CsI scintillators 16 times every 2.73 minutes. Counts of electrons between 0.3 and 0.9 MeV stopping in the thin scintillator were also obtained once each 2.73 minutes. Except as noted above, the experiment performed well from launch until 3 May 1969 (spacecraft reentry date).

=== Cosmic-Ray Proton (R versus DE/DX) ===
The experiment was designed to measure separately the contributions of solar nuclei and of galactic nuclei (Z<=14) using a solid-state cosmic ray telescope designed for energy-loss versus range or total energy measurements. The particle energy per nucleon intervals were approximately proportional to Z squared/A. For example, protons had intervals of 0.8 to 9.6 MeV, 9.6 to 18.8 MeV, 29.5 to 94.2 MeV, and 94.2 to 170 MeV and above. The detector viewing angle was perpendicular to the satellite spin axis. A second, smaller, solid-state telescope mounted parallel to the spacecraft spin axis was used to detect electrons in the ranges 80 to 130 keV and 175 to 390 keV. The electron detector was designed to provide information concerning the shape and intensity of the magnetospheric electron spectra. The detector accumulators for each energy interval were telemetered four times every 20.48-seconds. Each accumulation was 4.8-seconds long (spacecraft initial spin period was about 2.6-seconds). The output from three 256-channel nuclear-particle telescope pulse-height analyzers was obtained every 5.12-seconds and was telemetered along with the detector accumulators. The D3 element of the first telescope began to be intermittently noisy 16 November 1967, necessitating a more complex analysis to maintain data usefulness. After September 1968, no useful data above 30 MeV/nucleon were obtained. Otherwise, this telescope functioned until spacecraft reentry. The electron telescope provided useful data for only the first six days after launch.

=== Electrostatic Analyzer ===
An electrostatic analyzer and an E-cross-B velocity selector normal to the spacecraft spin axis were used to separately determine proton and alpha particle spectra in the solar wind. For each species, measurements in the energy per charge range 310 to 5100 eV were made at 14 points logarithmically equispaced in energy. During individual spacecraft rotations, counts were obtained in each of sixteen 22.5° sectors for a given species and energy. The sum of these counts, the sum of the squares of these counts, and the sector number of maximum counting were telemetered to Earth. After successive 61.44-seconds spectral determinations for protons and alpha particles, 15 consecutive readings for protons at 1408 eV were obtained. A period of 3.07 minutes separated two spectra of the same species. The instrument operated normally until 30 January 1968. At that time, it was turned off as spacecraft apogee had moved into the magnetotail. Later, attempts to reactivate the sensor failed.

=== Ion Chamber ===
The instrumentation for this experiment consisted of a 10 cm (3.9 in), Neher-type ionization chamber and two Lionel type 205 HT Geiger–Müller tubes (GM). The ion chamber responded omnidirectionally to electrons above 0.7 MeV and protons above 12 MeV. Both GM tubes were mounted parallel to the spacecraft spin axis. GM tube A detected electrons above 45 keV that were scattered from a gold foil. The acceptance cone for these electrons had a 70° full-angle and an axis of symmetry that was 20° off the spacecraft spin axis. GM tube B responded to electrons and protons above 22 and 300 keV, respectively, in an acceptance cone of 70° full-angle centered at the spin direction. Both GM tubes responded omnidirectionally to electrons and protons of energies above 2.5 and 50 MeV, respectively. Pulses from the ion chamber and counts from each GM tube were accumulated for 9.92-seconds and read out every 10.24-seconds. The time between the first two ion chamber pulses in an accumulation period was also telemetered. This experiment performed normally from launch through 8 September 1967, when GM tube A failed. On 5 November 1967, GM tube B failed and the experiment was terminated.

=== Low-Energy Proton and Alpha Detector ===
This experiment used a dE/dx versus E telescope with one thin and two thick surface-barrier, solid-state detectors and an anticoincidence plastic scintillator counter. The two thick detectors acted together as one detector. The telescope axis was perpendicular to the spacecraft spin axis. Counts of particles penetrating the thin detector and stopping in a thick detector were accumulated for two 4.48-seconds intervals every 2.73 minutes. The relative contributions to the count rate of protons and alpha particles with energies between 4.2 and 19.1 MeV/nucleon and energy spectral information were determined by 1024-channel pulse-height analysis, which was performed simultaneously on the output of the solid-state detectors eight times every 2.73 minutes. Protons stopping in the thin detector (and particles penetrating it) were measured by passing the output signal through an eight-level energy threshold discriminator. The eight corresponding proton energies ran from 1.1 to about 4 MeV. Data from any one level were transmitted once every 2.73 minutes. The anticoincidence scintillator failed in March 1968. This resulted in somewhat higher background count rates, which rendered isotopic (but not charge) separation more difficult. Except as already noted, the experiment performed well from launch until 3 May 1969 (spacecraft reentry date).

=== Low-Energy Proton and Electron Differential Energy Analyzer (LEPEDEA) ===
This experiment was designed to separately measure low-energy electron and proton intensities inside the magnetosphere and in the interplanetary region. The instrumentation system consisted of a cylindrical electrostatic analyzer (LEPEDEA or low-energy proton and electron differential energy analyzer) and a Bendix continuous channel multiplier (channeltron) array, and, in addition, an Anton 213 Geiger–Müller tube (GM) designed to survey the intensities of electrons with energies >40 keV in the outer magnetosphere. The electrostatic analyzer was capable of measuring the angular distributions and differential energy spectra of proton (25 eV to 47 keV) and electron (33 eV to 57 keV) intensities, separately, within 15 contiguous energy intervals. The analyzer accumulators were read out four times every 20.48-seconds. Each accumulation was about 480 ms long (spacecraft spin period was initially 2.6-seconds). A complete scan of the spectrum for four directions in a plane perpendicular to the spacecraft spin axis required 307.2-seconds for each energy interval. The detector responses for four approximately 60° segments of the angular distribution were slaved to the spacecraft telemetry system. The viewing direction of the segments was calculated from the spacecraft optical aspect information. The instruments performed normally from launch until the satellite decayed on 3 May 1969.

=== Low-Energy Solid-State Telescope ===
A four-element solid-state telescope with an acceptance cone half-angle of 20° was mounted normal to the spacecraft spin axis. During each 2.73-minutes interval, 9.82-seconds accumulations were obtained in each of 16 distinct counting modes. These modes involved protons in five energy intervals covering 0.6 to 18 MeV, alpha particles in four intervals covering 1.7 to 80 MeV, and electrons, deuterons, tritons, and Helium-3 nuclei in the intervals 0.3 to 3, 5 to 20, 5.5 to 25, and 11 to 72 MeV, respectively. Onboard calibration checks were performed every 6 hours. The experiment performed normally from launch to the spacecraft reentry date, 3 May 1969.

=== Solar Proton Monitoring Experiment ===
The solar proton monitoring experiment used four separate detectors, each of which used one or more solid-state sensors. Three detectors measured the omnidirectional fluxes of protons and alpha particles with energy per nucleon values above 10, 30, and 60 MeV. Alpha particle contributions to the total count rates were generally less than 10%. These detectors were also sensitive to electrons above approximately 0.7, 2, and 8 MeV, respectively. The 10-MeV channel was sampled for two 19.2-seconds intervals every 163.8-seconds and the 30- and 60-MeV channels for one 19.2-seconds interval every 163.8-seconds. Resultant hourly averaged fluxes have been published in Solar-Geophysical Data (NOAA, Boulder, Colorado) on a rapid basis. The fourth detector had a 60° full look angle normal to the spacecraft spin axis and measured fluxes of 1- to 10-MeV protons for two 19.2-seconds intervals every 163.8-seconds. Data were obtained from the first three detectors between launch and 3 May 1969. Data from the fourth detector were obtained between launch and 12 June 1968.

=== Spherical Electrostatic Analyzer ===
This experiment used a spherical electrostatic analyzer with an electron multiplier to study the directional properties, absolute intensity, time variations, and energy spectrum of protons, electrons, and alpha particles in the energy range below 10 keV. At launch, it was questionable whether the door on the experiment had opened. Within a week, the experiment failed. No useful data were obtained.

=== Triaxial Fluxgate Magnetometer ===
This experiment used a triaxial fluxgate magnetometer. Each sensor had dual ranges of minus to plus 32 nT and 128 nT and digitization errors of minus to plus 0.16 and 0.64 nT, respectively. The operating range could be changed by ground command. The sensor parallel to the spin axis was on a 1.8-m boom and was flipped every 3.9 d to check the zero level. The other two sensors were on a separate boom. Vector measurements were returned each 2.56 s. An onboard autocorrelation computer was included. Autocorrelation data based on 240 samplings were returned on alternate components each 20.45 s. The experiment worked well throughout the life of the spacecraft. However, failure of the spacecraft optical aspect system on 4 March 1969, rendered impossible the determination of the magnetic field direction over the last 2 months of data acquisition.

== See also ==
- Explorer 18
- Explorer 21
- Explorer 28
- Explorer program
