= Explorer 33 =

NASA satellite of the Explorer program (1966–)

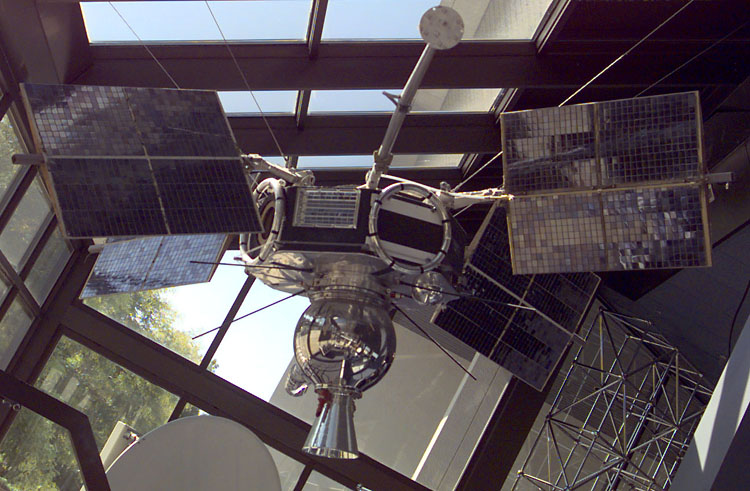
- Explorer 33 satellite
- Names: IMP-D; AIMP-1; Anchored Interplanetary Monitoring Platform-1
- Mission type: Magnetospheric research
- Operator: NASA
- COSPAR ID: 1966-058A
- SATCAT no.: 02258
- Mission duration: 5 years, 2 months and 19 days (achieved); 58 years, 8 months and 4 days (in orbit)

Spacecraft properties
- Spacecraft: Explorer XXXIII
- Spacecraft type: Anchored Interplanetary Monitoring Platform
- Bus: AIMP
- Manufacturer: Goddard Space Flight Center
- Launch mass: 93.4 kg (206 lb)
- Dimensions: 71 × 20.3 cm (28.0 × 8.0 in)
- Power: 43 watts

Start of mission
- Launch date: 1 July 1966, 16:02:25 GMT
- Rocket: Delta E1 (Thor 467 / Delta 039)
- Launch site: Cape Canaveral, LC-17A
- Contractor: Douglas Aircraft Company
- Entered service: 1 July 1966

End of mission
- Last contact: 21 September 1971

Orbital parameters
- Reference system: Geocentric orbit
- Regime: High Earth orbit
- Perigee altitude: 265,680 km (165,090 mi)
- Apogee altitude: 480,763 km (298,732 mi)
- Inclination: 24.40°
- Period: 26d 22hr 32min

Instruments
- Ames Magnetic Fields; Electron and Proton Detectors; GSFC Magnetometer; Ion Chamber and Geiger–Müller Counters; Low-Energy Integral Spectrum Measurement Experiment; Plasma Probe; Solar Cell Damage

Explorer 33, also known as IMP-D and AIMP-1, is a spacecraft in the Explorer program launched by NASA on 1 July 1966 on a mission of scientific exploration. It was the fourth satellite launched as part of the Interplanetary Monitoring Platform series, and the first of two "Anchored IMP" spacecraft to study the environment around Earth at lunar distances, aiding the Apollo program. It marked a departure in design from its predecessors, IMP-A (Explorer 18) through IMP-C (Explorer 28). Explorer 35 (AIMP-E, AIMP 2) was the companion spacecraft to Explorer 33 in the Anchored IMP program, but Explorer 34 (IMP-F) was the next spacecraft to fly, launching about two months before AIMP-E, both in 1967.

== Spacecraft ==
Explorer 33 (IMP-D) is a spin-stabilized (spin axis parallel to the ecliptic plane, spin period varying between 2.2 and 3.6 seconds) spacecraft instrumented for studies of interplanetary plasma, energetic charged particles (electrons, protons, and alphas), magnetic fields, and solar X rays at lunar distances. The spacecraft failed to achieve lunar orbit but did achieve mission objectives. Explorer 33 is also known as Interplanetary Monitoring Platform D (IMP-D) or Anchored Interplanetary Monitoring Platform 1 (AIMP-1).

Explorer 33 is similar in design to Explorer 28. The spacecraft has a mass of 93.4 kg. The main body of the spacecraft is an octagonal prism, 71 cm (28 in) across and 20.3 cm (8.0 in) high. Four n/p solar cell arrays that produced an average of 43 watts, extend from the main bus, along with two 183 cm (72 in) magnetometer booms. Four whip antennas are mounted on top of the spacecraft. A 35.8 kgf (351 N; 79 lbf) thrust retrorocket (Thiokol TE-M-458) is mounted on top of the bus. Power was stored in silver-cadmium batteries (Ag-Cd). Communication (PFM-PM telemetry) was via a 7-watts transmitter and a digital data processor.

== Mission ==
Explorer 33 was intended to be the first U.S. spacecraft to enter lunar orbit. The science objectives were to study the near-lunar magnetic field, ionosphere, solar plasma flux, energetic particle population, cosmic dust, and variations of the gravitational field from lunar orbit. After failing to achieve the intended lunar orbit, it made measurements from a highly elliptical Earth orbit of the interplanetary magnetic and radiation environment.

== Instruments ==
The scientific payload comprised seven experiments: two fluxgate magnetometers, an energetic particles experiment, an electron and proton experiment, a thermal ion and electron experiment, a plasma probe, and a solar cell damage experiment.

== Experiments ==
=== Ames Magnetic Fields ===
The Ames magnetometer experiment consisted of a boom-mounted triaxial fluxgate magnetometer and an electronics package. The sensors were orthogonally mounted with one sensor oriented along the spin axis of the spacecraft. A motor interchanged a sensor in the spin plane with the sensor along the spin axis every 24 hours, allowing inflight zero-level determination. The instrument package included a circuit for spin-demodulating the outputs from the sensors in the spin plane. The noise threshold was about 0.2 nT. The instrument had three ranges covering ± 20, 60, and 200 nT full scale for each vector component. The digitization accuracy for each range was 1% of the entire range covered. The magnetic field vector was measured instantaneously, and the instrument range was changed after each measurement. A period of 2.05-seconds elapsed between adjacent measurements and 6.14-seconds between measurements using the same range.

=== Electron and Proton Detectors ===
Three EON type 6213 Geiger–Müller tubes (GM1, GM2, and GM3) and a silicon solid-state detector (SSD) provided measurements of solar X rays (Geiger–Müller (GM) tubes only, between 2 and 12 A) and of solar, galactic, and magnetospheric charged particles. The Geiger–Müller tubes measured electrons of energies greater than 45 to 50 keV and protons of energies greater than 730 to 830 keV. The SSD output was discriminated at four thresholds: (1) PN1, which detected protons between 0.31 and 10 MeV and alphas between 0.59 and 225 MeV, (2) PN2, which detected protons between 0.50 and 4 MeV and alphas between 0.78 and 98 MeV, (3) PN3, which detected protons between 0.82 and 1.9 MeV and alphas between 1.13 and 46 MeV, and (4) PN4, which detected alphas between 2.1 and 17 MeV. GM1 and the SSD were oriented parallel to the spin axis, and GM3 was oriented antiparallel to the spin axis. Data from GM1 and PN1 were divided into data from quadrants oriented with respect to the Sun (sectors I, II, III, and IV were centered 180°, 270°, 0° and 90° from the Sun, respectively). Data were read out in either 82-seconds or 164-seconds intervals. High temperatures adversely affected the SSD particle data during the periods from 16 September to 14 January and from 16 March to 14 July of each year following 16 September 1966. However, the alpha particle data are believed to be unaffected. On rare occasions (less than 10), a GM tube would produce a high, spurious count rate for a period of several hours. This effect apparently was produced only during periods of extremely high particle and X-ray fluxes. Accumulator failures occurred on 21 July 1967 and 24 September 1967.

=== GSFC Magnetometer ===
The instrumentation for this experiment consisted of a boom-mounted triaxial fluxgate magnetometer. Each of the three sensors had a range of ± 64 nT and a digitization resolution of ± 0.25 nT. Zero-level drift was checked by periodic reorientation of the sensors. Spacecraft fields at the sensors were not greater than the digitization uncertainty. One vector measurement was obtained each 5.12-seconds. The bandpass of the magnetometer was 0 to 5 Hz, with a 20-dB per decade decrease for higher frequencies. The detector functioned well between launch and 10 October 1968, when the DC power converter failed. No useful data were obtained after that date.

=== Ion Chamber and Geiger–Müller Counters ===
This experiment consisted of a 10.2 cm (4.0 in), Neher-type ionization chamber and two Lionel type 205 HT Geiger–Müller tubes (GM). The ion chamber responded omnidirectionally to electrons above 0.7 MeV and protons above 12 MeV. Both GM tubes were mounted perpendicular to the spacecraft spin axis. GM tube A detected electrons above 45 keV which were scattered off a gold foil. The acceptance cone for these electrons had a full-angle of 61° and axis of symmetry which was perpendicular to the spacecraft spin axis. GM tube B responded to electrons and protons above 22 and 300 keV, respectively, in an acceptance cone of 45° full-angle with axis of symmetry perpendicular to the spacecraft spin axis. Both GM tubes responded omnidirectionally to electrons and protons of energies above 2.5 and 35 MeV, respectively. Pulses from the ion chamber and counts from each GM tube were accumulated for 39.72-seconds and read out every 40.96-seconds. The time between the first two ion-chamber pulses in an accumulation period was also telemetered. The ion chamber operated normally from launch through 2 September 1966. From 2 September 1966, the ion chamber operated at a lower threshold voltage.

=== Low-Energy Integral Spectrum Measurement Experiment ===
A wide-aperture, multi-grid potential analyzer was used to observe the intensity of the electron and ion components of the low-energy plasma in interplanetary space and near Earth. Integral spectra were obtained for both ions and electrons in the energy ranges from 0 to 45 eV (15 steps) and 0 to 15 eV (15 steps). Complete spectra for protons and electrons were obtained every 80-seconds. The experiment operated until 29 June 1967.

=== Plasma Probe ===
A split-collector Faraday cup mounted on the spacecraft equator was used to study the directional intensity of solar wind ions and electrons. The following 25-seconds sequence was executed three times for ions and once for electrons each 328-seconds. Twenty-seven directional current samples from the two collectors were taken in the energy per charge (E/Q) window from 80 to 2850 eV. The currents in the two collectors were then sampled in eight E/Q windows between 50 and 5400 eV at the azimuth at which peak current appeared in the previous 27 measurements. Due to telemetry limitations, only the following data were returned to Earth every 328-seconds: for ions, the sums of currents measured on the two collector plates twice and the difference once, and for electrons, the sums once. The experiment worked well from launch until the final spacecraft data transmission (21 September 1971).

== Launch ==
Explorer 33 was launched on 1 July 1966 from Cape Kennedy, Florida. The Thor-Delta E1 second and third stages both delivered too much thrust, resulting in an excess velocity of about 21.3 m/s (70 ft/s) towards the Moon. This was too much for the retrorocket to overcome to put the spacecraft into the intended lunar orbit (1,300 × 6,440 km (810 × 4,000 mi) with 175°. inclination). Instead, the retrorocket was used to put Explorer 33 into a highly elliptical initial Earth orbit of 449,174 × 30,550 km (279,104 × 18,983 mi) with an inclination of 28.9° and an apogee beyond lunar orbit. It came within 35,000 km (22,000 mi) of the Moon on its first orbit, and came within 40,000 × 60,000 km (25,000 × 37,000 mi) on subsequent approaches in September, November and December 1966. All experiments operated successfully until September 1971.

When it was launched, AIMP-1 achieved the highest orbit of any satellite up to that time, with an apogee of 480,763 km (298,732 mi) and a perigee of 265,680 km (165,090 mi).

== Orbit ==
Originally intended for a lunar orbit, mission controllers worried that the spacecraft's velocity was too fast to guarantee lunar capture. Consequently, mission managers opted for a backup plan of placing the craft into an eccentric Earth orbit with a perigee of 265,680 km (165,090 mi) and an apogee of 480,763 km (298,732 mi)—still reaching beyond the Moon's orbit.

Despite not attaining the intended lunar orbit, the mission met many of its original goals in exploring solar wind, interplanetary plasma, and solar X-rays. Principal investigator James Van Allen used electron and proton detectors aboard the spacecraft to investigate charged particle and X-ray activity. Astrophysicists N. U. Crooker, Joan Feynman, and J. T. Gosling used data from Explorer 33 to establish relationships between the Earth's magnetic field and the solar wind speed near Earth.

== MOSFET-based telemetry system ==
The first of Explorer 33's predecessors in the Interplanetary Monitoring Platform series, Explorer 18 (IMP-A), had been the first spacecraft to fly with integrated circuits on board. AIMP-1 advanced the state of the art again when it was the first spacecraft to use the MOSFET (metal–oxide–semiconductor field-effect transistor, or MOS transistor), which was adopted by NASA for the IMP program in 1964. The use of MOSFETs was a major step forward in spacecraft electronics design. The MOSFET blocks were manufactured by General Microelectronics, which had NASA as its first MOS contract shortly after it had commercialized MOS technology in 1964.

MOSFETs had first been demonstrated in 1960 and publicly revealed in 1963. Metal–oxide–semiconductor technology simplified semiconductor device fabrication and manufacturing, enabling higher transistor counts on integrated circuit chips. This resolved a growing problem facing spacecraft designers at the time, the need for greater on-board electronic capability for telecommunications and other functions. The Goddard Space Flight Center used MOSFETs in building block circuits, with MOSFET blocks and resistors accounting for 93% of the AIMP-D's electronics. MOS technology allowed for a substantial increase in the overall number of transistors and communication channels, from 1,200 transistors and 175 channels on the first three IMP spacecraft up to 2,000 transistors and 256 channels on the AIMP-D. MOS technology also greatly reduced the number of electrical parts required on a spaceship, from 3,000 non-resistor parts on IMP-A down to 1,000 non-resistor parts on the AIMP-1, despite the satellite having twice the electrical complexity of IMP-A. While IMP-A through IMP-C had made some use of integrated circuits, the encoders still primarily used discrete transistors (one per package). AIMP-1's design put 4,200 semiconductors into 700 packages, reducing the number of individual components used and the amount of space they occupied. Components were combined into cordwood modules.

AIMP-1 (IMP-D) improved upon its predecessors' Digital Data Processors (DDPs) and had an Optical Aspect Computer capable of operating in different power-saving modes to reduce load on the satellite's batteries and solar panels. As in previous IMP spacecraft, experiments stored data into accumulators which were then read out on a repeating cycle and encoded into pulse-frequency modulation (PFM) signals to be sent to ground stations. This cycle was also interleaved with analog transmissions for certain experiments.

== See also ==
- Explorer 35 (AIMP-2)
- 1966 in spaceflight
- Explorer 18
- Explorer 21
- Explorer 28
- Explorer program
