= Delta C =

American expendable launch vehicle

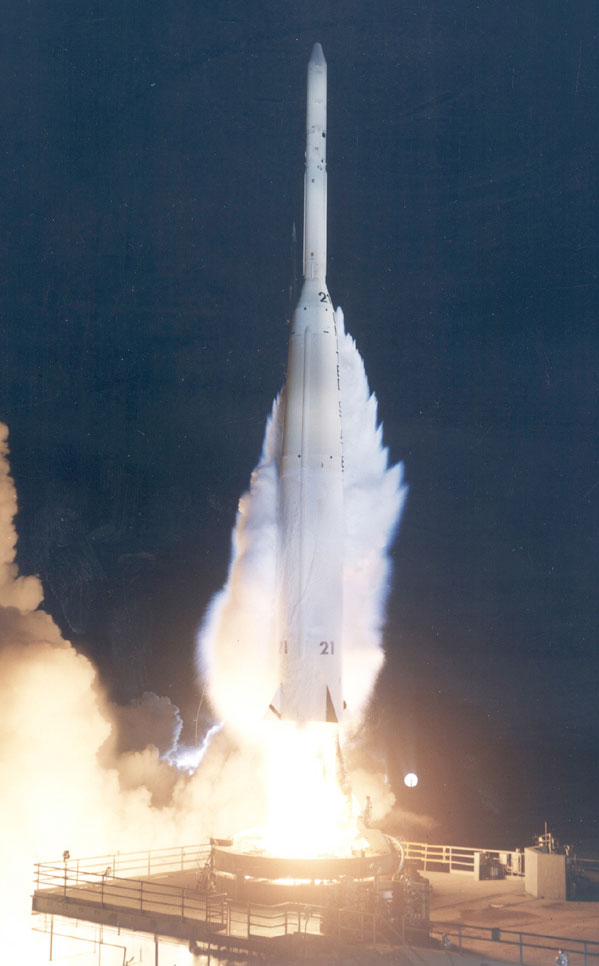
- The first Delta C launches with Explorer 18
- Function: Expendable launch system
- Manufacturer: Douglas Aircraft Company
- Country of origin: United States

Launch history
- Status: Retired
- Launch sites: Cape Canaveral LC-17
- Total launches: 13
- Success(es): 12
- Failure: 1
- First flight: 27 November 1963
- Last flight: 22 January 1969

The Delta C, or Thor-Delta C was an American expendable launch system used for thirteen orbital launches between 1963 and 1969. It was a member of the Delta family of rockets.

== Configuration ==
The first stage was a Thor missile in the DSV-2A (MB-3-II) configuration, and the second stage was the Delta D (AJ-10-118D), which was derived from the earlier Delta. The baseline Delta C used an Altair-2 (X-258) third stage, whilst the Delta C1 had an FW-4D third stage, which provided a higher payload capacity than the Altair. It is unclear whether two or three launches were made using the C1 configuration.

== Launches ==
The Delta C was launched from Cape Canaveral Launch Complex 17. Most launches carried NASA research satellites into low Earth orbit.

Variant	S/N	Date	Launch site	Payload	Result
Delta C	387/D-21	27.11.1963	CC LC-17B	Explorer 18 (IMP A)	Success
Delta C	392/D-26	04.10.1964	CC LC-17A	Explorer 21 (IMP B)	Success
Delta C	393/D-27	21.12.1964	CC LC-17A	Explorer 26 (EPE D)	Success
Delta C	374/D-28	22.01.1965	CC LC-17A	TIROS 9	Success
Delta C	411/D-29	03.02.1965	CC LC-17B	OSO 2	Success
Delta C	441/D-31	29.05.1965	CC LC-17B	Explorer 28 (IMP C)	Success
Delta C	415/D-32	02.07.1965	CC LC-17B	TIROS 10	Success
Delta C	434/D-33	25.08.1965	CC LC-17B	OSO C	Failure
Delta C	445/D-36	03.02.1966	CC LC-17A	ESSA 1	Success
Delta C	431/D-46	08.03.1967	CC LC-17A	OSO 3	Success
Delta C	490/D-53	18.10.1967	CC LC-17B	OSO 4	Success
Delta C1	436/D-38	25.05.1966	CC LC-17B	Explorer 32 (AE B)	Success
Delta C1	487/D-64	22.01.1969	CC LC-17B	OSO 5	Success
