= Explorer 35 =

NASA satellite of the Explorer program

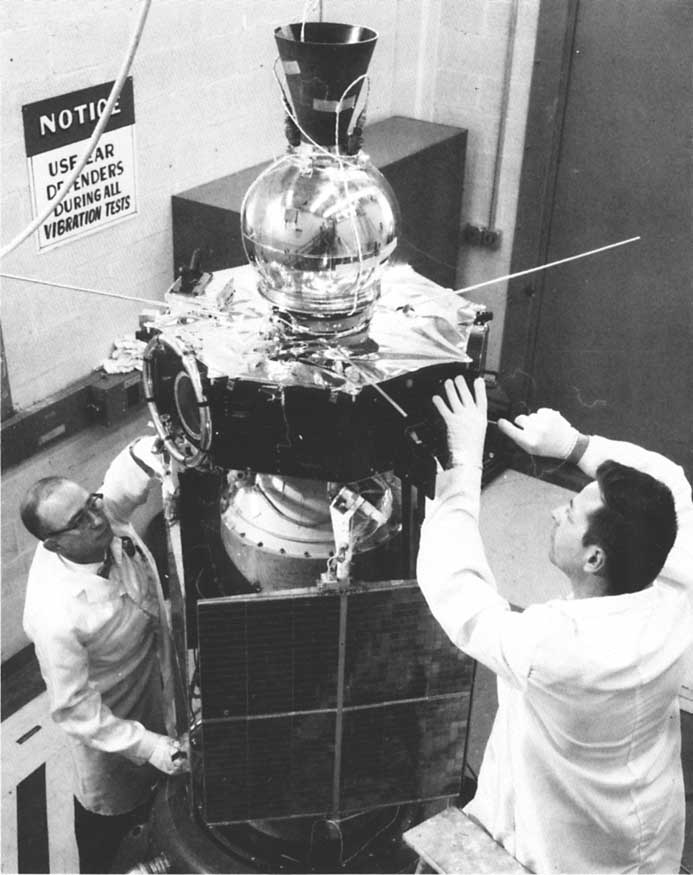
- Explorer 35 satellite
- Names: IMP-E; AIMP-2; Anchored Interplanetary Monitoring Platform-2
- Mission type: Space physics
- Operator: NASA
- COSPAR ID: 1967-070A
- SATCAT no.: 02884
- Mission duration: 2167 days (achieved)

Spacecraft properties
- Spacecraft: Explorer XXXV
- Spacecraft type: Anchored Interplanetary Monitoring Platform
- Bus: AIMP
- Manufacturer: Langley Research Center
- Launch mass: 104.3 kg
- Payload mass: 23.1 kg (51 lb)
- Dimensions: 71 × 20.3 cm (28.0 × 8.0 in)
- Power: 70 watts

Start of mission
- Launch date: 19 July 1967, 14:19:02 GMT
- Rocket: Thor-Delta E1 (Thor 488 / Delta 050)
- Launch site: Cape Canaveral, LC-17B
- Contractor: Douglas Aircraft Company
- Entered service: 19 July 1967

End of mission
- Deactivated: 24 June 1973

Orbital parameters
- Reference system: Selenocentric orbit
- Periselene altitude: 764 km (475 mi)
- Aposelene altitude: 7,886 km (4,900 mi)
- Inclination: 147.30°
- Period: minutes

Lunar orbiter
- Orbital insertion: 21 July 1967

Instruments
- AMES Magnetic Fields; Bistatic Radar Observations of the Lunar Surface; Electron and Proton Detectors; GSFC Magnetometer; Low-Energy Integral Spectrum Measurement Experiment; Micrometeorite Flux; Plasma Probe; Selenodetic Studies; Solar Cell Damage

Explorer 35 (IMP-E, AIMP-2, Anchored IMP-2, Interplanetary Monitoring Platform-E), was a spin-stabilized spacecraft built by NASA as part of the Explorer program. It was designed for the study of the interplanetary plasma, magnetic field, energetic particles, and solar X-rays from lunar orbit.

== Spacecraft ==
Explorer 35 was similar to the earlier Explorer 33. The spacecraft mass was 104.3 kg (230 lb). The main body of the spacecraft was an octagonal prism, 71 cm (28 in) across and 20.3 cm (8.0 in) high. Four arrays containing 6144 n/p solar cells, providing an average of 70 watts of power, extended from the main bus, along with two 183 cm (72 in) magnetometer booms. Four whip antennas are mounted on top of the spacecraft. A retrorocket was mounted on top of the bus. Power was stored in silver-cadmium batteries (Ag-Cd). Communication (PFM telemetry) was via a 7-watt transmitter and a digital data processor. The science payload had a mass of 23.1 kg (51 lb) and included two 3-axis magnetometers, low-energy protons and alpha energy analyzer, a low-energy protons and electrons detector, an energetic particle detector, a plasma probe, a micrometeorite detector, a solar cell damage experiment, and gravity field and bistatic radar experiments.

== Mission ==
Part of the Interplanetary Monitoring Platform program, it was of a design similar to Explorer 33 (IMP-D / AIMP-1), which launched in 1966. However, Explorer 34 (IMP-F), with a different design and mission objectives, was launched about two months prior to IMP-E. Explorer 41 (IMP-G) was the next IMP spacecraft to fly after Explorer 35, in 1969. It was also designed to study the Moon's gravity field, ionosphere, and micrometeorite, and dust distribution. The spin axis direction was nearly perpendicular to the ecliptic plane, and the spin rate was 25.6 rpm.

== Launch ==
Explorer 35 was launched on 19 July 1967 from the Eastern Test Range of Cape Kennedy on a Thor-Delta E1 (Thrust Augmented Delta - TAD). It went on a direct ascent trajectory, reaching the Moon on 22 July 1967. It entered an initial 800 × 7,692 km (497 × 4,780 mi) altitude elliptical lunar orbit at 147° inclination after a 23-second retrorocket burn. The main engine separated 2 hours later. Explorer 35 operated normally in lunar orbit for 6 years until it was shut off on 24 June 1973.

== Experiments ==
=== AMES Magnetic Fields ===
The Ames magnetometer experiment consisted of a boom-mounted triaxial fluxgate magnetometer and an electronics package. The sensors were orthogonally mounted, with one sensor oriented along the spin axis of the spacecraft. A motor interchanged a sensor in the spin plane with the sensor along the spin axis every 24 hours, allowing in-flight calibration. The instrument package included a circuit for demodulating the outputs from the sensors in the spin plane. The noise threshold was about 0.2 nT. The instrument had three ranges covering ± 20, 60, and 200 nT full scale for each vector component. The digitization accuracy for each range was 1% of the entire range covered. The magnetic field vector was measured instantaneously, and the instrument range was changed after each measurement. A period of 2.05 seconds elapsed between adjacent measurements and, a period of 6.14 seconds elapsed between measurements using the same range. The instrument performance was normal.

Explorer 35 provided important reference data for magnetic field measurements taken on the Moon during the Apollo program.

=== Bistatic Radar Observations of the Lunar Surface ===
The purpose of this experiment was to study the electromagnetic reflective properties of the lunar surface. The 136.10-Hz (2.2 m (7 ft 3 in)) telemetry transmissions from the spacecraft were scattered from the lunar surface and then recorded by use of the 46 m (151 ft) Stanford dish antenna. The reflected signal intensity depended upon the lunar reflectivity, the spacecraft altitude above the lunar surface, and the mean curvature of the Moon. The returned signal bandwidth was proportional to the RMS lunar surface slopes. Occultation phenomena permitted a determination of the scattering properties of the lunar limb. The dielectric constant of the lunar subsurface in the scattering region below a depth of about 25 cm (9.8 in) was then determined from a profile of reflectivity values versus the angle of incidence on the Moon. The mean lunar slope over each area from which signals were reflected has also been inferred. The observations were located within about 10° of the lunar equator. Experiment operation was normal as of March 1971.

=== Electron and Proton Detectors ===
Three EON type 6213 Geiger–Müller tubes (GM1, GM2, and GM3) and a silicon solid-state detector (SSD) provided measurements of solar X-rays (GM1 only, between 2 and 12 A) and charged particles in the vicinity of the Moon. GM1 and GM3 measured electrons of energies greater than 48 to 50 keV and protons of energy greater than 740 to 820 keV, while GM2 was shielded by a cap with approximately 1 gram per cm^{2} (limiting its response to protons of energies greater than about 55 MeV). The SSD output was discriminated at four thresholds: (1) PN1, which detected protons between 0.32 and 6.3 MeV, (2) PN2, which detected protons between 0.48 and 3.0 MeV, (3) PN4, which detected alpha particles between 2 and 10.2 MeV, and (4) PN3, which was sensitive to particles of Z greater than 3, including carbon-12 between 0.58 and 9.5 MeV per nucleon, nitrogen-14 between 0.514 and 13.9 MeV per nucleon, and oxygen-16 between 0.466 and 18.8 MeV per nucleon. GM1 and SSD were oriented perpendicular to the spacecraft spin axis, GM2 was oriented parallel to the spin axis, and GM3 was oriented antiparallel to the spin axis. Data from GM1, PN1, and PN4 were divided into data from quadrants oriented with respect to the Sun (sectors I, II, III, and IV were centered 180°, 270°, 0°, and 90° away from the Sun, respectively). Data were read out every 82 or 164seconds, and the experiment's performance was normal.

=== Energetic Particle ===
This experiment consisted of a 12 cm (4.7 in) Neher-type ionization chamber and two Lionel type 205 HT Geiger–Müller tubes (GM). The ion chamber responded omnidirectionally to electrons above 0.7 MeV and protons above 12 MeV. Both GM tubes were mounted parallel to the spacecraft spin axis. GM tube 1 detected electrons above 45 keV that were scattered off a gold foil. The acceptance cone for these electrons had a 70« full-angle and an axis of symmetry that was 20« off the spacecraft spin axis. GM tube 2 responded to electrons and protons above 22 and 300 keV, respectively, in an acceptance cone of 70° full-angle centered at the spacecraft spin axis. Both GM tubes responded omnidirectionally to electrons and protons of energies above 2.5 and 50 MeV, respectively. Pulses from the ion chamber and counts from each GM tube were accumulated for 39.72 seconds and read out every 40.96 seconds. In addition, the time between the first ion chamber pulses in an accumulation period was also telemetered. This experiment performed well initially.

=== GSFC Magnetometer ===
The experiment consisted of a boom-mounted triaxial fluxgate magnetometer. Each sensor had dual ranges of minus to plus 24 nT and 64 nT, with digitization resolutions of ± 0.094 nT and 0.250 nT, respectively. Zero-level drift was checked by periodic reorientation of the sensors until 20 May 1969, when the flipper mechanism failed. Past this point, data analysis was more difficult as the zero-level drift of the sensor parallel to the spacecraft spin axis was not readily determined. Spacecraft interference was less than 0.125 nT. One vector measurement was obtained each 5.12-seconds. The bandpass of the magnetometer was 0 to 5 Hz, with a 20-dB per decade decrease for higher frequencies. Except for the flipper failure, the experiment functioned normally from launch to spacecraft turnoff on 24 June 1973.

=== Low-Energy Integral Spectrum Measurement Experiment ===
A planar multi-grid sensor programmed as a retarding potential analyzer was used to observe the intensity of the electron and ion components of the low energy plasma near the Moon. Integral spectra were obtained for both ions and electrons in the energy range from 1 to 500 eV. A complete spectrum was obtained every 80 seconds.

=== Micrometeorite Flux ===
This experiment was designed to measure the ionization, momentum, speed, and direction of micrometeorites, using thin film charged detectors, induction devices, and microphones.

=== Plasma Probe ===
A multigrid, split-collector Faraday cup mounted on the equator of the spacecraft was used to study the directional intensity of solar wind positive ions and electrons with particular emphasis on the interaction of the solar wind with the moon. Twenty-seven integral current samples (requiring about 4.3 s) were taken in an energy-per-charge window from 80 to 2850 eV. Then the current was sampled in eight differential energy-per-charge windows between 50 and 5400 eV at the azimuth where the peak current appeared in the previous series of integral measurements. These measurements (integral and differential) took about 25 s. Both the sum and difference of collector currents were obtained for positive ions. Only the sum was obtained for electrons. A complete set of measurements (two collector plate sums and one difference for protons, and one collector plate sum for electrons) required 328 s. The experiment worked well from launch until its failure in July 1968.

=== Selenodetic Studies ===
Range and range-rate tracking data of the Explorer 35 satellite as it orbited the Moon were used to obtain selenodetic gravity field information based on the perturbations to the satellite orbit imparted by the lunar mass distribution.

== End of Mission ==
After a successful operation for 6 years, the spacecraft was turned off on 24 June 1973. The orbit would have naturally decayed after this point, resulting in an impact on the Moon at an unknown time and location. Explorer 35 (or Explorer XXXV) was also known as the Anchored Interplanetary Monitoring Platform-2 (AIMP-2 or IMP-E).

== See also ==
- Explorer 33 (AIMP-1)
- Explorer program
