= Interplanetary Monitoring Platform =

NASA program to investigate interplanetary plasma and magnetic field

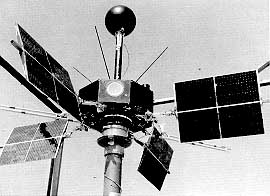
IMP-A/-B/-C design series

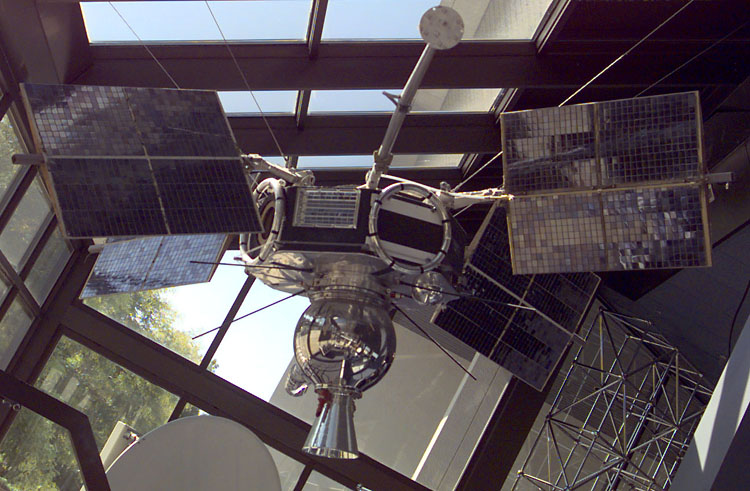
IMP-D/-E design series

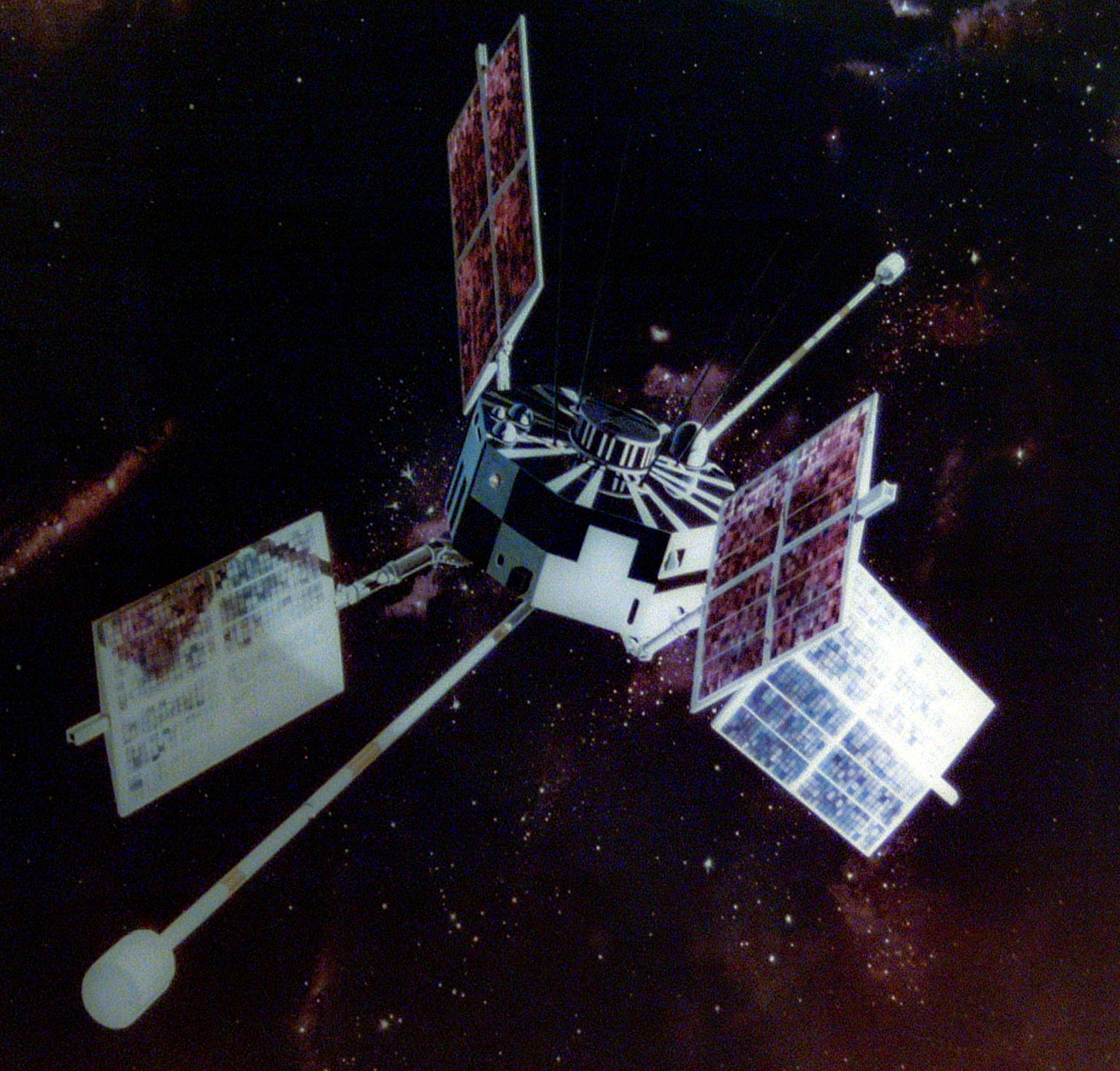
IMP-F/-G design series

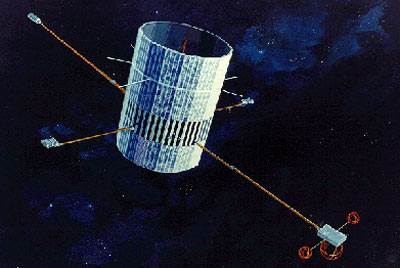
IMP-I/-H/-J design series

Interplanetary Monitoring Platform was a program managed by the NASA Goddard Space Flight Center in Greenbelt, Maryland, as part of the Explorers program, with the primary objectives of investigation of interplanetary plasma and the interplanetary magnetic field. The orbiting of IMP satellites in a variety of interplanetary and earth orbits allowed study of spatial and temporal relationships of geophysical and interplanetary phenomena simultaneously by several other NASA satellites.

== Satellites ==
Launch Date	Launch Place	Satellite		Launch mass	Decay Date	Notes
Launch Date	Launch Place	Explorer	IMP	Launch mass	Decay Date	Notes
27 November 1963, 02:30 UTC	Cape Canaveral LC-17B	Explorer 18	IMP-A	138 kg (304 lb)	December 30, 1965	IMP 1. First use of integrated circuits in a spacecraft. First satellite in IMP-A/-B/-C design series.
4 October 1964, 03:45 UTC	Cape Canaveral LC-17A	Explorer 21	IMP-B	138 kg (304 lb)	January 1, 1966	IMP 2. Second satellite in IMP-A/-B/-C design series.
29 May 1965, 12:00 UTC	Cape Canaveral LC-17B	Explorer 28	IMP-C	128 kg (282 lb)	4 July 1968	IMP 3. Third satellite in IMP-A/-B/-C design series.
1 July 1966, 16:02 UTC	Cape Canaveral LC-17A	Explorer 33	IMP-D / AIMP-D	212 kg (467 lb)	In orbit	AIMP 1. First use of MOSFET integrated circuits in a spacecraft, similar design to IMP-E. Originally intended to orbit the Moon, but placed in an elliptical high orbit instead.
24 May 1967, 14:05 UTC	Vandenberg SLC-2E	Explorer 34	IMP-F	163 kg (359 lb)	May 3, 1969	IMP 4. Similar design to IMP-G.
19 July 1967, 14:19 UTC	Cape Canaveral LC-17B	Explorer 35	IMP-E / AIMP-E	104 kg (229 lb)	After June 24, 1973	AIMP 2, similar design to IMP-D. Positioned in Selenocentric orbit.
21 June 1969, 08:47 UTC	Vandenberg SLC-2W	Explorer 41	IMP-G	175 kg (386 lb)	December 23, 1972	IMP 5. Similar design to IMP-F.
13 March 1971, 16:15 UTC	Cape Canaveral LC-17A	Explorer 43	IMP-I	635 kg (1,400 lb)	October 2, 1974	IMP 6. First spacecraft in IMP-I/-H/-J series.
23 September 1972, 01:20 UTC	Cape Canaveral LC-17B	Explorer 47	IMP-H	390 kg (860 lb)	In orbit	IMP 7. Second spacecraft in IMP-I/-H/-J series.
26 October 1973, 02:26 UTC	Cape Canaveral LC-17B	Explorer 50	IMP-J	410 kg (900 lb)	In orbit	IMP 8. Last satellite IMP, remained in service until 2006. Third spacecraft in IMP-I/-H/-J series.

== Technology ==
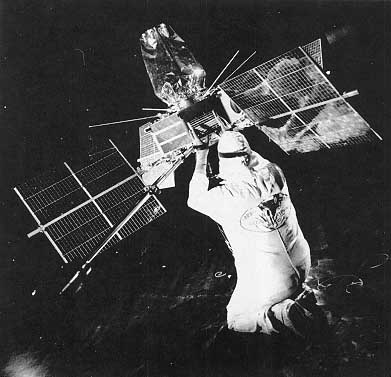
IMP-D was the first spacecraft to use the MOSFET

The IMP program was the first space program to use integrated circuit (IC) chips, which it first launched into space with the IMP-A (Explorer 18) in 1963. This predates the use of IC chips in the Apollo Guidance Computer, used for the Apollo program.

The MOSFET (metal–oxide–semiconductor field-effect transistor, or MOS transistor) was adopted by NASA for the IMP program in 1964. The use of MOSFETs was a major step forward in spacecraft electronics design.

The IMP-D (Explorer 33), launched in 1966, was the first spacecraft to use the MOSFET, which had been first demonstrated in 1960 and publicly revealed in 1963. MOS technology's simplicity of semiconductor device fabrication and manufacturing enabled higher transistor counts on integrated circuit chips. This resolved a growing problem facing spacecraft designers at the time, the need for greater on-board electronic capability for telecommunications and other functions. The Goddard Space Flight Center used MOSFETs in building block circuits, with MOSFET blocks and resistors accounting for 93% of the IMP-D's electronics. MOS technology greatly increased the number of on-board transistors and communication channels, from 1,200 transistors and 175 channels on the first three IMP spacecraft up to 2,000 transistors and 256 channels on the IMP-D. MOS technology also greatly reduced the number of electrical parts required on a spaceship, from 3,000 non-resistor parts on the IMP-A (Explorer 18) down to 1,000 non-resistor parts on the IMP-D, despite the IMP-D having twice the electrical complexity of the IMP-A. The MOSFET blocks were manufactured by General Microelectronics, which had NASA as its first MOS contract shortly after it had commercialized MOS technology in 1964.

== Applications ==
IMPs were used to study the magnetic fields, solar wind and cosmic rays outside the magnetic field of the Earth. It was closely related to the development of the Apollo program. The IMP program consisted of a network of eleven satellites designed to collect data on space radiation in support of the Apollo program. The IMP satellites investigated plasma (ionized gas), cosmic rays, and magnetic fields in interplanetary and cislunar space, from various solar and terrestrial orbits. Data gathered by IMP spacecraft and satellites were used to support the Apollo program, enabling the first human Moon landing with the Apollo 11 mission in 1969.
