= Sidney H. Liebson =

Sidney H. Liebson (July 9, 1920 – February 7, 2017) received his Ph.D. from the University of Maryland in 1947. His thesis was on the discharge mechanism of Geiger–Müller counters. Liebson received a US Navy award for developing the first equipment used to identify enemy radar.

Liebson participated in atomic bomb testing in the Pacific, developing radiation detectors that were used to measure bomb characteristics. In a significant test, his detectors validated the feasibility of making the hydrogen bomb. At a time when electronics had not been able to make measurements with nanosecond accuracy, he developed several techniques to accomplish this accuracy for measuring organic fluorescence decay times and organic scintillation pulse widths by indirect means.

His 1947 invention of the use of halogen gas in Geiger–Müller tubes led to considerable benefits in reducing the voltage of operation and greatly extended the life of the tubes. All modern GM tubes use his halogen-based quench gas. This innovation occurred while he was working on his thesis. Liebson died on February 7, 2017.
