= Explorer 28 =

NASA satellite of the Explorer program

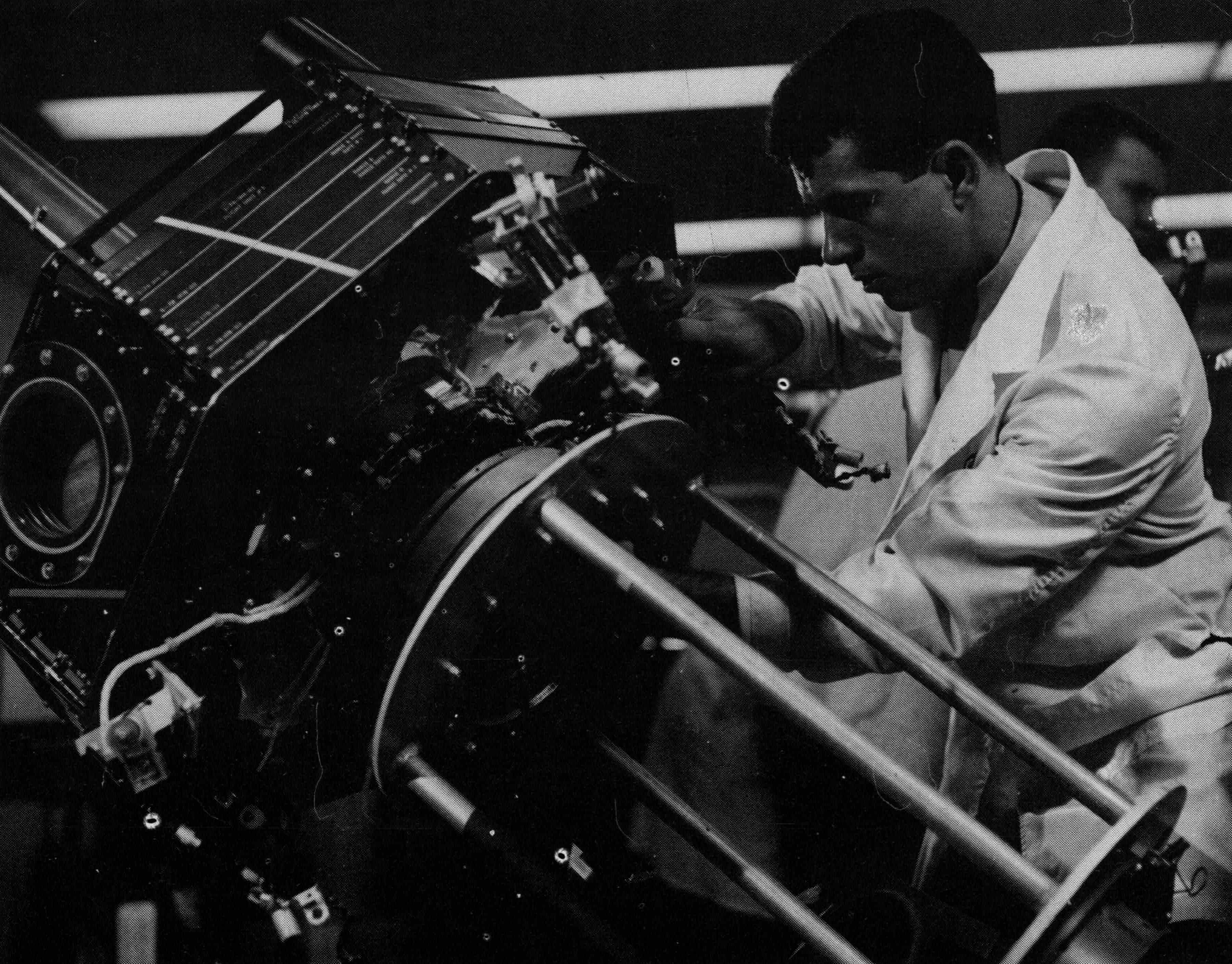
- Explorer 28 satellite
- Names: IMP-C; IMP-3; Interplanetary Monitoring Platform-3
- Mission type: Space physics
- Operator: NASA
- COSPAR ID: 1965-042A
- SATCAT no.: 01388
- Mission duration: 2 years (achieved)

Spacecraft properties
- Spacecraft: Explorer XXVIII
- Spacecraft type: Interplanetary Monitoring Platform
- Bus: IMP
- Manufacturer: Goddard Space Flight Center
- Launch mass: 128 kg (282 lb)
- Dimensions: 71 × 20.3 cm (28.0 × 8.0 in)
- Power: 4 deployable solar arrays and batteries

Start of mission
- Launch date: 29 May 1965, 12:00:00 GMT
- Rocket: Thor-Delta C (Thor 441 / Delta 031)
- Launch site: Cape Canaveral, LC-17B
- Contractor: Douglas Aircraft Company
- Entered service: 29 May 1965

End of mission
- Last contact: 12 May 1967
- Decay date: 4 July 1968

Orbital parameters
- Reference system: Geocentric orbit
- Regime: Low Earth orbit
- Perigee altitude: 32,290 km (20,060 mi)
- Apogee altitude: 227,456 km (141,335 mi)
- Inclination: 53.60°
- Period: 8341.90 minutes

Instruments
- Cosmic-Ray Range versus Energy Loss; Cosmic Rays; Fluxgate Magnetometer; Ion Chamber and Geiger–Müller Counters; Langmuir probe Plasma and Faraday Cup; Retarding Potential Analyzer

Explorer 28, also called IMP-C, IMP-3 and Interplanetary Monitoring Platform-3, was a NASA satellite launched on 29 May 1965 to study space physics, and was the third spacecraft launched in the Interplanetary Monitoring Platform program. It was powered by chemical batteries and solar panels. There were 7 experiments on board, all devoted to particle studies. Performance was normal until late April 1967, when intermittent problems began. It stayed in contact until 12 May 1967, when contact was lost. The orbit decayed until it re-entered the atmosphere on 4 July 1968. The spacecraft design was similar to its predecessors Explorer 18 (IMP-A), launched in November 1963, and Explorer 21 (IMP-B), launched in October 1964, though this satellite was a few kilograms lighter. The successor Explorer 33 (IMP-D) began the use of a new design.

== Mission ==
Explorer 28 (IMP-3) was a solar-cell and chemical-battery powered spacecraft instrumented for interplanetary and distant magnetospheric studies of energetic particles, cosmic rays, magnetic fields, and plasmas. Initial spacecraft parameters included a local time of apogee of 20:20 hours, a spin rate of 23.7 rpm, and a spin direction of 64.9° right ascension and -10.9° declination. Each normal telemetry sequence was 81.9-seconds in duration and consisted of 795 data bits. After every third normal telemetry sequence there was an 81.9-seconds interval of rubidium vapor magnetometer analog data transmission.

== Experiments ==
=== Cosmic-Ray Range versus Energy Loss ===
A charged-particle, solid-state telescope was used to measure range and energy loss of galactic and solar cosmic rays. The experiment was designed to study particle energies (energy per nucleon intervals approximately proportional to Z squared /A; for protons 2.6 to 190 MeV, 13.3 to 26 MeV, 26 to 94 MeV, and 94 to 190 MeV) and charge spectra (Z<=6). The detector was oriented normal to the spacecraft spin axis. The detector accumulators for each energy interval were telemetered six times every 5.46 minutes. Each accumulation was about 40-seconds long (initial spacecraft spin period was about 3.3-seconds). The output from two 128-channel, pulse-height analyzers was obtained for one incident particle every 41-seconds and was read out along with the detector accumulators. The experiment performed normally until 21 April 1966, after which several problems with the instrumentation developed, causing spikes in the count rate data, especially in the lowest energy channel. The date of transmission of the last useful information was 29 April 1967.

=== Cosmic Rays ===
This experiment consisted of two detector systems. The first was a dE/dx versus E telescope with thin and thick Caesium iodide (CsI) scintillators (one each) and an anticoincidence plastic scintillator counter. The telescope axis was normal to the spacecraft spin axis. Counts of particles penetrating the thin CsI scintillator and stopping in the thick CsI scintillator were accumulated during one 39.36-seconds interval every 5.46 minutes. The relative contribution to the count rate of various species (electrons between 3 and 12 MeV, ions with charge = 1 or 2, atomic mass = 1, 2, 3 or 4, and energy between 18.7 and 81.6 MeV/nucleon) and energy spectral information were determined by 512-channel, pulse-height analysis performed simultaneously on the output of both CsI scintillators six times every 5.46 minutes. The second detector system consisted of two Geiger–Müller tube (GM) telescopes oriented parallel to and perpendicular to the spacecraft spin axis. Each telescope consisted of two colinear GM tubes. The parallel and perpendicular telescopes measured the sum of counts due to protons above 70 MeV and electrons above 6.5 MeV and the sum of counts due to protons above 65 MeV and electrons above 6 MeV, respectively. Counts registered in any one of the four GM tubes were also accumulated. These omnidirectional counts were due to protons above 50 MeV plus electrons above 4 MeV. The parallel, perpendicular, and omnidirectional count rates were obtained for one 40-seconds accumulation interval during successive normal 81.9-seconds telemetry sequences. Thus, any one count rate was measured for 40-seconds once each 5.46 minutes. Both detector systems worked well from launch until 11 May 1967.

=== Fluxgate Magnetometer ===
Each of two uniaxial fluxgate magnetometers had a dynamic range of plus or minus 40 nT and a sensitivity of plus or minus 0.25 nT. One fluxgate magnetometer failed at launch, but the other performed normally, sampling the magnetic field 30 times within each of six 4.8-s intervals every 5.46 min. Uncertainties in data were plus or minus 1.0 nT. Useful data were transmitted until May 11, 1967. A rubidium vapor magnetometer was included in the experiment package, but it produced no useful data.

=== Ion Chamber and Geiger–Müller Counters ===
This experiment, designed to measure fluxes of geomagnetically trapped particles, consisted of a 7.6 cm (3.0 in)-diameter, Neher-type ionization chamber and two Anton 223 Geiger–Müller tubes. The ion chamber responded to electrons and protons with energies greater than 1 and 17 MeV, respectively. Both GM tubes were mounted parallel to the spacecraft spin axis. GM tube A detected electrons greater than 45 keV scattered off a gold foil. The acceptance cone for these electrons had a full-angle of 61 deg, and its spin axis of symmetry made an angle of 59.5° with the spacecraft spin axis. GM tube A responded omnidirectionally to electrons and protons with energies greater than 6 and 52 MeV, respectively. GM tube B looked directly into space through a hole in the spacecraft skin. The acceptance cone for GM tube B had a full-angle of 38°, and its axis of symmetry was parallel to the spacecraft spin axis. Omnidirectionally, GM tube B responded to electrons and protons with energies greater than 6 and 52 MeV, respectively. Directionally, GM tube B responded to electrons and protons with energies greater than 40 and 500 keV, respectively. Pulses from the ion chamber were accumulated for 326.08-seconds and read out once every 327.68-seconds. Counts from GM tube A were accumulated for 39.36-seconds and read out six times every 327.68-seconds. Counts from GM tube B were accumulated for 39.36-seconds and read out five times every 327.68-seconds. This experiment performed normally from launch through 11 May 1967, the date of the last useful data transmission.

=== Plasma and Faraday Cup ===
The Faraday cup was a multi-element split collector instrument intended to make differential energy spectrum measurements of interplanetary and magnetospheric ions and electrons. The experiment failed at launch.

=== Retarding Potential Analyzer ===
The retarding potential analyzer was a four-element Faraday cup. It was mounted normal to the spacecraft spin axis and had an effective look angle of 5 sr. The experiment operated for 5.2-seconds in each of six modes once every 648-seconds. In two modes, 15-step spectra for ions were determined for retarding potentials in the ranges -5 V to +5 V and -5 V to +45 V. In two other modes, similar information for electrons was obtained by changing the signs of the potentials. The remaining two modes were net current modes with zero potential applied to all elements for 15 measurements. The instrument experienced secondary electron contamination, but operated without degradation during the spacecraft lifetime.

=== Solar Wind Protons ===
A quadrispherical electrostatic analyzer with a current collector and an electrometer amplifier was intended to detect and analyze the positive ion component of the incident plasma and to study its gross flow characteristics as a function of radial distance from the Earth. The instrument failed at launch and thus produced no useful data.

== See also ==
- Explorer 18
- Explorer 21
- Explorer program
