= Explorer 21 =

NASA satellite of the Explorer program

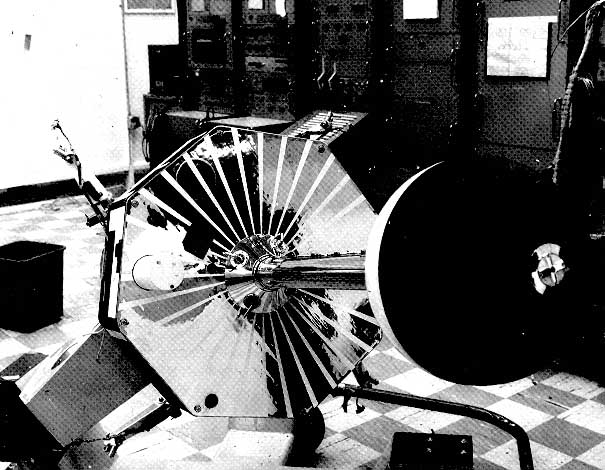
- Explorer 21 satellite
- Names: IMP-B; IMP-2; Interplanetary Monitoring Platform-2
- Mission type: Space physics
- Operator: NASA
- COSPAR ID: 1964-060A
- SATCAT no.: 00889

Spacecraft properties
- Bus: IMP
- Manufacturer: Goddard Space Flight Center
- Launch mass: 138 kg (304 lb)
- Power: 4 deployable solar arrays and batteries

Start of mission
- Launch date: 4 October 1964, 03:45:00 GMT
- Rocket: Thor-Delta C (Thor 392 / Delta 026)
- Launch site: Cape Canaveral, LC-17A
- Contractor: Douglas Aircraft Company
- Entered service: 4 October 1964

End of mission
- Last contact: 13 October 1965
- Decay date: 1 January 1966

Orbital parameters
- Reference system: Geocentric orbit
- Regime: Highly elliptical orbit
- Perigee altitude: 917 km (570 mi)
- Apogee altitude: 94,288 km (58,588 mi)
- Inclination: 33.70°
- Period: 2080.00 minutes

Instruments
Instruments
- Cosmic-Ray Range versus Energy Loss
- Cosmic Rays
- Faraday Cup
- Fluxgate Magnetometers
- Ion Chamber and Geiger–Müller Counters
- Retarding Potential Analyzer
- Solar Wind Protons

Explorer 21, also called IMP-B, IMP-2 and Interplanetary Monitoring Platform-2, was a NASA satellite launched as part of Explorer program. Explorer 21 was launched on 4 October 1964, at 03:45:00 GMT from Cape Canaveral (CCAFS), Florida, with a Thor-Delta C launch vehicle. Explorer 21 was the second satellite of the Interplanetary Monitoring Platform, and used the same general design as its predecessor, Explorer 18 (IMP-A), launched the previous year, in November 1963. The following Explorer 28 (IMP-C), launched in May 1965, also used a similar design.

== Mission ==
Explorer 21 was a solar cell and chemical-battery powered spacecraft instrumented for interplanetary and distant magnetospheric studies of energetic particles, cosmic rays, magnetic fields, and plasmas. Each normal telemetry sequence of 81.9 seconds in duration consisted of 795 data bits. After every third normal sequence there was an 81.9 seconds interval of rubidium vapor magnetometer analog data transmission. Initial spacecraft parameters included a local time of apogee at noon, a spin rate of 14.6 rpm, and a spin direction of 41.4° right ascension and 47.4° declination.

== Experiments ==
=== Cosmic-Ray Range versus Energy Loss ===
A charged-particle, solid-state telescope was used to measure range and energy loss of galactic and solar cosmic rays. The experiment was designed to study particle energies (energy per nucleon intervals approximately proportional to Z squared/A, for protons 0.9 to 190 MeV, 6.5 to 19 MeV, 19 to 90 MeV, and 90 to 190 MeV) and charge spectra (Z<=6). The detector was oriented normal to the spacecraft spin axis. The detector accumulators for each energy interval were telemetered six times every 5.46 minutes. Each accumulation period was about 40-seconds long (initial spacecraft spin period was about 4.1 seconds). The output from two 128-channel, pulse-height analyzers was obtained for one incident particle every 41 seconds and read out along with the detector accumulations. Useful data were obtained from launch until 9 April 1965. Data coverage was intermittent throughout the life of the spacecraft due to frequent spacecraft shutoffs and sporadic failure of some detectors.

=== Cosmic Rays ===
This experiment consisted of two detector systems. The first was a dE/dx versus E telescope with thin and thick Caesium iodide (CsI) scintillators (one each) and an anticoincidence plastic scintillation counter. The telescope axis was normal to the spacecraft spin axis. Counts of particles penetrating the thin CsI scintillator and stopping in the thick CsI scintillator were accumulated during one 39.36-seconds interval every 5.46 minutes. The relative contribution to the count rate of various species (electrons between 3 and 12 MeV, ions with charge = 1 or 2, atomic mass = 1, 2, 3 or 4, and energy between 18.7 and 81.6 MeV/nucleon) and energy spectral information were determined by 512-channel, pulse-height analysis performed simultaneously on the output of both CsI scintillators six times every 5.46 minutes. The second detector system consisted of two Geiger–Müller tube (GM) telescopes oriented parallel to and perpendicular to the spacecraft spin axis. Each telescope consisted of two colinear GM tubes. The parallel and perpendicular telescopes measured the sum of counts due to protons above 70 MeV and electrons above 6.5 MeV and the sum of counts due to protons above 65 MeV and electrons above 6 MeV, respectively. Counts registered in any one of the four GM tubes were also accumulated. These omnidirectional counts were due to protons above 50 MeV plus electrons above 4 MeV. The parallel, perpendicular, and omnidirectional count rates were obtained for one 40-seconds accumulation interval during successive normal 81.9-seconds telemetry sequences. Thus, any one count rate was measured for 40-seconds once each 5.46 minutes.

=== Faraday Cup ===
The five-element Faraday cup on Explorer 21 measured electrons between 130 and 265 eV and ions in the following five energy windows: 40 to 90, 95 to 230, 260 to 650, 700 to 2000, and 1700 to 5400 eV. For each 5.46-minutes interval, 22 usable, instantaneous current samples were recorded for each energy window, separated by 0.16-seconds each. Two collector plates were used to yield information about the angular variation out of the satellite spin plane. The sum and difference of the currents on the two plates and the direction with maximum current were telemetered. The effect of secondary electrons has not been eliminated and could be very significant within the Earth's plasmasphere.

=== Fluxgate Magnetometer ===
Each of two uniaxial fluxgate magnetometers, having dynamic ranges of plus or minus 40 nT, sampled the magnetic field 30 times within each of six 4.8-seconds intervals every 5.46 minutes. Detector sensitivities were plus or minus 0.25 nT, and digitization uncertainty was plus or minus 0.40 nT. A rubidium vapor magnetometer was used to calibrate the fluxgate magnetometers but did not produce an independently useful data set. The magnetometers functioned normally throughout the useful life of the satellite.

=== Ion Chamber and Geiger–Müller Counters ===
This experiment, designed to measure fluxes of geomagnetically trapped particles, consisted of a 7.6-cm diameter, Neher-type ionization chamber and two Anton 223 Geiger–Müller (GM) tubes. The ion chamber responded to electrons and protons with energies greater than 1 and 17 MeV, respectively. Both GM tubes were mounted parallel to the spacecraft spin axis. GM tube A detected electrons greater than 45 keV scattered off a gold foil. The acceptance cone for these electrons had a full-angle of 61°, and its axis of symmetry made an angle of 59.5° with the spacecraft spin axis. GM tube A responded omnidirectionally to electrons and protons with energies greater than 6 and 52 MeV, respectively. GM tube B looked directly into space through a hole in the spacecraft skin. The acceptance cone for GM tube B had a full-angle of 38°, and its axis of symmetry was parallel to the spacecraft spin axis. Omnidirectionally, GM tube B responded to electrons and protons with energies greater than 6 and 52 MeV, respectively. Directionally, GM tube B responded to electrons and protons with energies greater than 40 and 500 keV, respectively. Pulses from the ion chamber were accumulated for 326.08 s and read out once every 327.68-seconds. Counts from GM tube A were accumulated for 39.36-seconds and read out six times every 327.68-seconds. Counts from GM tube B were accumulated for 39.36-seconds and read out five times every 327.6-seconds.

=== Retarding Potential Analyzer ===
The retarding potential analyzer was a four-element Faraday cup. It was mounted normal to the spacecraft spin axis and had an effective look angle of 5 sr. The experiment operated for 5.2 s in each of four modes once every 648 s. In two modes, 15-step spectra for ions were determined for retarding potentials in the ranges of minus 5 V to plus 15 V and minus 5 V to plus 45 V. In the other two modes, similar information for electrons was obtained by changing the signs of the potentials. The instrument experienced secondary electron contamination but returned essentially continuous data until 5 April 1965.

=== Solar Wind Protons ===
A quadrispherical electrostatic analyzer with a current collector and an electrometer amplifier was intended to detect and analyze the positive ion component of the incident plasma and to study its gross flow characteristics. The planned monitoring of the interplanetary medium was not accomplished because the apogee that the satellite achieved was lower than expected. Protons were analyzed in 12 energy channels between 0.7 and 8 KeV. The instrument was mounted on the satellite equatorial plane and had a view angle of 15° in this plane and of 90° in the plane containing the spin axis. The satellite equatorial plane was divided into three contiguous sectors (61°, 95° and 204°) by use of an optical aspect sensor. The peak flux in one sector was recorded at one analyzer plate potential per revolution of the satellite (no information as to the position within the sector in which the peak flux occurred was retained). After 12 revolutions, all the energy channels had been scanned, and the process was repeated for the next sector. A complete scan in energy and sector was repeated every 5.46 minutes. Because the instrument was not capable of observing magnetospheric plasma, no data were obtained for the time when the satellite was in the magnetosphere. The data may be useful in identifying the magnetopause and bow shock.

== Results ==
The significant deviation of the spin rate and direction from the planned values and the achievement of an apogee of less than half the planned value adversely affected data usefulness. Otherwise, spacecraft systems performed well, with nearly complete data transmission for the first 4 months and for the sixth month after launch. Data transmission was intermittent for other times, and the final transmission occurred on 13 October 1965. Explorer 21 decayed on 1 January 1966.

== See also ==
- Explorer 18
- Explorer program
