= Explorer 18 =

NASA satellite of the Explorer program

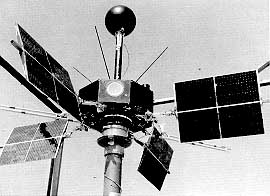
- Explorer-18 (IMP-A) satellite
- Names: IMP-A; IMP-1; Interplanetary Monitoring Platform-1; S-74
- Mission type: Space physics
- Operator: NASA
- COSPAR ID: 1963-046A
- SATCAT no.: 00693

Spacecraft properties
- Spacecraft: IMP
- Manufacturer: Goddard Space Flight Center
- Launch mass: 138 kg (304 lb)
- Power: 4 deployable solar arrays and batteries

Start of mission
- Launch date: 27 November 1963, 02:30:01 GMT
- Rocket: Thor-Delta C (Thor 387 / Delta 021)
- Launch site: Cape Canaveral, LC-17B
- Contractor: Douglas Aircraft Company
- Entered service: 27 November 1963

End of mission
- Last contact: 10 May 1965
- Decay date: 30 December 1965

Orbital parameters
- Reference system: Geocentric orbit
- Regime: Highly elliptical orbit
- Perigee altitude: 4,395 km (2,731 mi)
- Apogee altitude: 192,003 km (119,305 mi)
- Inclination: 35.20°
- Period: 5606 minutes

Instruments
Instruments
- Cosmic-Ray Range versus Energy Loss
- Cosmic Rays
- Faraday Cup
- Fluxgate Magnetometers
- Ion Chamber and Geiger–Müller Counters
- Retarding Potential Analyzer
- Solar Wind Protons

Explorer 18, also called IMP-A, IMP-1, Interplanetary Monitoring Platform-1 and S-74, was a NASA satellite launched as part of the Explorer program. Explorer 18 was launched on 27 November 1963 from Cape Canaveral Air Force Station (CCAFS), Florida, with a Thor-Delta C launch vehicle. Explorer 18 was the first satellite of the Interplanetary Monitoring Platform (IMP). Explorer 21 (IMP-B) launched in October 1964 and Explorer 28 (IMP-C) launched in May 1965 also used the same general spacecraft design.

== Mission ==
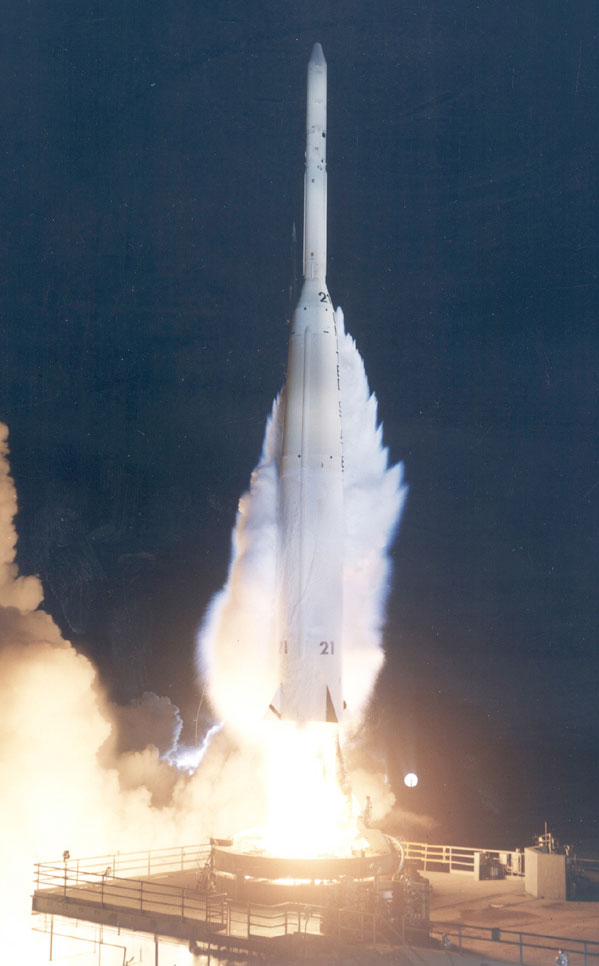
Launch of Thor-Delta C with Explorer 18 satellite

Explorer 18 was a solar cell and chemical-battery powered spacecraft instrumented for interplanetary and distant magnetospheric studies of energetic particles, cosmic rays, magnetic fields, and plasmas. Initial spacecraft parameters included a local time of apogee of 10:20 hours, a spin rate of 22 rpm, and a spin direction of 115° right ascension and -25° declination. Each normal telemetry sequence of 81.9 seconds duration consisted of 795 data bits. After every third normal sequence there was an 81.9 seconds interval of rubidium vapor magnetometer analog data transmission. The spacecraft performed normally until 30 May 1964, then intermittently until 10 May 1965, when it was abandoned. The principal periods of data coverage were 27 November 1963 to 30 May 1964; 17 September 1964 to 7 January 1965; and 21 February 1965 to 25 March 1965; however, only the first of these periods was very useful.

== Experiments ==
=== Cosmic-Ray Range versus Energy Loss ===
A charged-particle, solid-state telescope was used to measure the range and energy loss of galactic and solar cosmic rays. The experiment was designed to study particle energies (energy per nucleon intervals approximately proportional to Z squared/A) and charge spectra (Z<=6). The detector was oriented normal to the spacecraft spin axis. The detector accumulators for each energy interval were telemetered six times every 5.46 minutes. Each accumulation period was about 40 seconds (the initial spacecraft spin period was about 2 seconds). The output from two 128-channel, pulse-height analyzers was obtained for one incident particle every 41 seconds and read out along with the detector accumulations. A malfunction limited alpha studies to particles with E>30 MeV.

=== Cosmic Rays ===
This experiment consisted of two detector systems. The first was a dE/dx versus E telescope with thin and thick Caesium iodide (CsI) scintillators (one each) and an anticoincidence plastic scintillation counter. The telescope axis was normal to the spacecraft spin axis. Counts of particles penetrating the thin CsI scintillator and stopping in the thick CsI scintillator were accumulated during one 39.36-seconds interval every 5.46 minutes. The relative contribution to the count rate of various species (electrons between 3 and 12 MeV, ions with charge=1 or 2, atomic mass=1, 2, 3 or 4, and energy between 18.7 and 81.6 MeV/nucleon) and energy spectral information were determined by 512-channel pulse-height analysis performed simultaneously on the output of both CsI scintillators six times every 5.46 minutes. The second detector system consisted of two Geiger–Müller tube (GM) telescopes oriented parallel to and perpendicular to the spacecraft spin axis. Each telescope consisted of two colinear GM tubes. The parallel and perpendicular telescopes measured, respectively: 1) the sum of counts due to protons above 70 MeV and electrons above 6.5 MeV and 2) the sum of counts due to protons above 65 MeV and electrons above 6 MeV. Counts registered in any one of the four GM tubes were also accumulated. These omnidirectional counts were due to protons above 50 MeV plus electrons above 4 MeV. The parallel, perpendicular, and omnidirectional count rates were obtained for one 40-seconds accumulation interval during successive normal 81.9-seconds telemetry sequences. Thus, any one count rate was measured for 40 seconds once each 5.46 minutes. Both detector systems worked well from launch until 26 May 1964.

=== Faraday Cup ===
A five-element, split-collector Faraday cup was used to measure solar wind particles in the following sequence: positive ions from 45 to 105 eV, positive ions from 95 to 235 eV, positive ions from 220 to 640 eV, positive ions from 560 to 1800 eV, electrons from 65 to 210 eV, and positive ions from 1700 to 5400 eV. The split plane of the collector was in the spin equatorial plane of the spacecraft. Measurements consisted of 22 instantaneous current samples, each separated by 0.16 seconds (spanning more than one satellite rotation). These measurements represented the sum of the current to the split collector, the maximum difference in current encountered during spacecraft rotation, and an identification of which half of the collector was maximum. The entire sequence required 2.8 minutes and was repeated every 5.5 minutes. The entrance cone for this Faraday cup had a half-angle of about 80°. Interference was encountered from refracted particles (with the most pronounced effect at about 70° incidence to cup normal), from secondary electrons, and from Ultraviolet radiation.

=== Fluxgate Magnetometers ===
Each of two uniaxial fluxgate magnetometers, having dynamic ranges of ± 40 nT, sampled the magnetic field 30 times within each of six 4.8-seconds intervals every 5.46 minutes. Detector sensitivities were plus or minus 0.25 nT, and digitization uncertainty was plus or minus 0.40 nT. A rubidium vapor magnetometer was used to calibrate the instruments but did not produce any independently useful data sets. The instruments functioned normally throughout the useful life of the satellite and provided usable data through 30 May 1964.

=== Ion Chamber and Geiger–Müller Counters ===
The instrumentation for this experiment, designed to measure fluxes of geomagnetically trapped particles, consisted of a 7.6 cm (3.0 in) diameter, Neher-type ionization chamber and two Anton 223 Geiger–Müller tubes. The ion chamber responded to electrons and protons with E>1 and E>17 MeV, respectively. Both Geiger–Müller tubes were mounted parallel to the spacecraft spin axis. One Geiger–Müller tube detected electrons, with E>45 keV, scattered off a gold foil. The acceptance cone for these electrons had a 61° full-angle, and its axis of symmetry made an angle of 59.5° with the spacecraft spin axis. This Geiger–Müller tube responded omnidirectionally to electrons and protons with E>6 and E>52 MeV, respectively. The second Geiger–Müller tube had no direct access to the space environment and responded omnidirectionally to background electrons and protons with E>6 and E>52 MeV, respectively. Pulses from the ion chamber were accumulated for 326.08 seconds and read out once every 327.68 seconds. Counts from the first Geiger–Müller tube were accumulated for 39.36 seconds and read out six times every 327.68 seconds. Counts from the second Geiger–Müller tube were accumulated for 39.36 seconds and read out five times every 327.68 seconds. This experiment performed normally from launch through 10 May 1965.

=== Retarding Potential Analyzer ===
The retarding potential analyzer was a three-element planar Faraday cup. It was mounted normal to the spacecraft spin axis and had an effective look angle of 5 sr. Coarse and fine resolution modes were programmed for both ions and electrons. These modes consisted of 15 steps each for retarding voltages of 0 to 28 V and 0 to 100 V. The entire ion and electron sequence was repeated once every 10.92 minutes, and each 15-step spectral analysis required 5.4 seconds. The experiment operated for about 20 hours after launch, until a failure of a mechanical programmer switch terminated operations. The data were adversely affected by secondary electrons and no longer exist.

=== Solar Wind Protons ===
A quadrispherical electrostatic analyzer with a current collector and an electrometer amplifier was used to detect and analyze the positive ion component of the incident plasma and to study its gross flow characteristics. Protons were analyzed in 14 energy channels between 0.025 and 16 keV. The instrument was mounted on the satellite equatorial plane and had a view angle of 15° in this plane and of 90° in the plane containing the spin axis. The satellite's equatorial plane was divided into three contiguous sectors (111.8°, 111.8° and 136.4°) by use of an optical aspect sensor. The peak flux in one sector was recorded at one analyzer plate potential per revolution of the satellite (no information about the position within the sector in which the peak flux occurred was retained). After 14 revolutions, all energy channels had been scanned, and the process was repeated for the next sector. A complete scan in energy and sector was repeated every 5.46 minutes. No data were obtained for the brief periods when the satellite was in the magnetosphere. The instrument operated well until April 1964 when it started operating intermittently. Its operation continued to degrade thereafter.

== Digital Data Processor ==
The satellite included a Digital Data Processor (DDP) telemetry system which made the first use of integrated circuits on a flown spacecraft, predating both the D-37C computer used in the Minuteman II missile system and the Apollo Guidance Computer. The DDP allowed the different onboard digital experiments to store results into accumulators which were then read out on a repeating cycle and encoded into pulse-frequency modulation (PFM) signals to be sent to ground stations. The accumulators totaled 105 bits, plus a 15-bit clock. In addition to the digital data sent in PFM format, a little over half of the normal transmission cycle (9 of 16 "frames") was used for sending analog signals.

The processor used Series 51 chips from Texas Instruments, specifically the SN510 (a clocked SR latch) and the SN514 (dual 3-input NAND/NOR gates), which both came in 8-pin flatpack packages and used resistor-capacitor-transistor logic (RCTL). However, only two transistors could be put onto a single dies at the time, so multiple dies with the different logic components that had to be connected together by hand with tiny wires before being sealed up in the package, making them very expensive to produce. Early examples cost more than US$400 (equivalent to $4,300 in 2025).

== See also ==
- Explorer program
