= Explorer 52 =

NASA satellite of the Explorer program

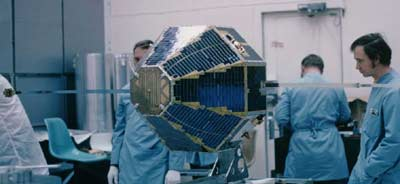
- Explorer 52 (Hawkeye-1) satellite
- Names: Hawkeye-1; Injun-6; IE-D; Ionospheric Explorer-D; Neutral Point Explorer
- Mission type: Ionospheric research
- Operator: NASA / Langley Research Center
- COSPAR ID: 1974-040A
- SATCAT no.: 07325
- Mission duration: 3 years, 10 months, 24 days

Spacecraft properties
- Spacecraft: Explorer LII
- Spacecraft type: Ionospheric Explorer
- Bus: Injun
- Manufacturer: University of Iowa
- Launch mass: 22.7 kg (50 lb)
- Power: 36 watts

Start of mission
- Launch date: 3 June 1974, 23:09:11 UTC
- Rocket: Scout E1 (S-191C)
- Launch site: Vandenberg, SLC-5
- Contractor: Vought
- Entered service: 3 June 1974

End of mission
- Decay date: 28 April 1978

Orbital parameters
- Reference system: Geocentric orbit
- Regime: Polar orbit
- Perigee altitude: 469 km (291 mi)
- Apogee altitude: 125,570 km (78,030 mi)
- Inclination: 89.80°
- Period: 3032.40 minutes

Instruments
- Extremely low frequency (ELF) / Very low frequency (VLF) Receivers; Low-Energy Proton and Electron Differential Energy Analyzer (LEPEDEA); Triaxial Fluxgate Magnetometer

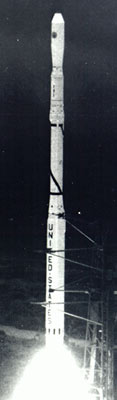
Scout E1 rocket with Explorer 52

Explorer 52, also known as Hawkeye-1, Injun-F, Neutral Point Explorer, IE-D, Ionospheric Explorer-D, was a NASA satellite launched on June 3, 1974, from Vandenberg Air Force Base on a Scout E-1 launch vehicle.

== Mission ==
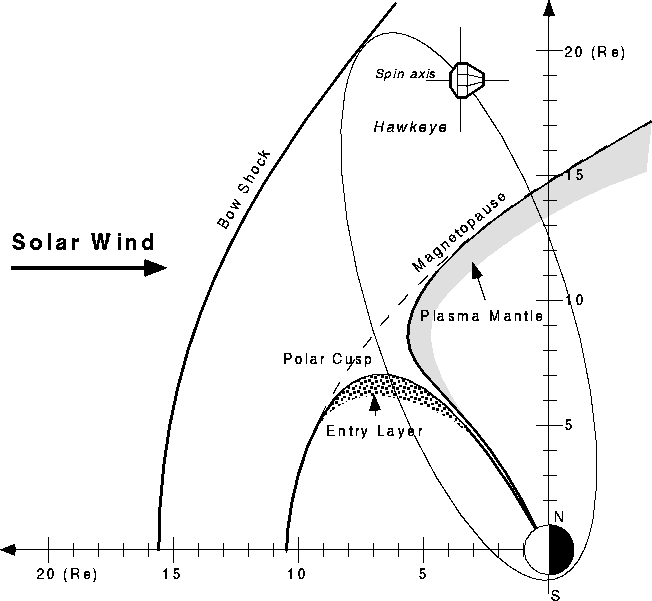
Orbit of Explorer 52

The primary mission objective of Explorer 52 (Hawkeye-1) was to conduct particle and field investigations of the polar magnetosphere of the Earth out to 21 Earth radii. Secondary objectives were to make magnetic field and plasma distribution measurements in the solar wind and to study Type-3 radio emissions caused by solar electron streams in the interplanetary medium. To accomplish these objectives, the spacecraft was instrumented with the following instruments:

- A plasma wave receivers;
- A fluxgate magnetometer;
- A low-energy proton-electron differential energy analyzer.

== Instruments ==
=== Extremely low frequency (ELF) / Very low frequency (VLF) Receivers ===
This experiment measured electric and magnetic fields using a 42.7 m (140 ft) electric dipole (tip-to-tip) and a search coil antenna deployed 1.58 m (5 ft 2 in) from the spacecraft. The electric field spectrum measurements were made in 16 logarithmically spaced frequency channels extending from 1.78 Hz to 178 kHz, and DC electric fields were also measured. The bandwidth of these channels varied from 7.5% to 30% depending on center frequency. Channel sensitivity and dynamic range were 1E-6 V/m and 100 dB, respectively. A wideband receiver was also used, with two selectable bandwidth ranges: 0.15 to 10 kHz or 1 to 45 kHz. The magnetic field spectrum was measured in eight discrete, logarithmically spaced channels from 1.78 Hz to 5.62 kHz. The bandwidth of these channels varied from 7.5% to 30% depending on frequency. The dynamic range was 100 dB, and the sensitivity ranged from 0.1-nT at 1.78 Hz to 3.4E-4 nT at 5.62 kHz. The wideband receiver described above could be used with the magnetic antenna. Each discrete channel was sampled once every 11.52-seconds.

=== Low-Energy Proton and Electron Differential Energy Analyzer (LEPEDEA) ===
This particle spectrometer (LEPEDEA) employed two electrostatic analyzers to measure protons and electrons simultaneously. A GM tube was an additional detector sensitive to protons above 600 keV and electrons above 45 keV. The sensors were mounted normally to the spacecraft spin axis. Angular distributions of particles were determined with a sector resolution of 50° for analyzer voltage steps and 10° for analyzer voltage sweeps of its whole range. The electrostatic analyzers had a field of view of 8° by 30° and measured protons and electrons from 0.05 to 40 keV. The Geiger–Müller tube had a conical field of view of 15° half-angle. Two modes of operation were used: one instrument cycle of 156 intensity measurements every 46-seconds, or one cycle of 312 intensity measurements every 92-seconds.

=== Triaxial Fluxgate Magnetometer ===
A four-range, triaxial fluxgate magnetometer mounted on a 1.52 m (5 ft 0 in) boom, was used to measure the ambient magnetic field. The three axes were sampled sequentially three times each 5.72 seconds. Sensitivities and accuracies of the four ranges were ± 150 and 1.2, 450 and 3.5, 1500 and 11.7, and 25,000 and 195.3-nT, respectively. The sensitivity was switched by ground command. Frequency response was DC to 1-Hz (flat); down 3-dB at 10-Hz; then falling at 6-dB per octave at higher frequencies. Satellite stray fields were constrained to be less than 0.1 nT, which was also the RMS instrument noise level. Inflight calibration was performed once every 98-minutes.

== Spacecraft ==
The spacecraft was spin-stabilized satellite with a nominal rotational period of 11 seconds. In celestial coordinates, the positive spin axis coordinates were right ascension 299.4° (± 1.1°) and declination 8.6° (± 1.5°). There was no onboard orientation or spin rate control, but the orientation of the spin axis was stable. An optical aspect system operated from launch until 3 September 1974 at which time the optical aspect system was turned off and failed to turn back on. After this period, the aspect had to be determined by observing the effect of optical illumination from the Sun on a plasma measurement system. Using the sharp peak observed in this data, corrected orientation information was obtained and rewritten to the data records. The complete spacecraft with instruments had a mass of 22.65 kg (49.9 lb). Power of 36 watts, depending on the solar aspect, was obtained from solar cells. Explorer 52 participated in the International Magnetospheric Study (IMS) and during the first half of 1977 data acquisition was confined to IMS special intervals. Data were obtained in real-time only, at frequencies of 136 and 400-MHz at 100 bit/s (or 200 bit/s with convolutional coding) plus wideband Very low frequency (VLF) data.

It was designed, built, and tracked by personnel in the Department of Physics and Astronomy at the University of Iowa, whose sports teams are the Iowa Hawkeyes. The spacecraft was launched on 3 June 1974 into a polar orbit with an apogee over the North Pole and re-entered on 28 April 1978 after 667 orbits or nearly four years of continuous operation. The spacecraft apogee was of 125,570 km (78,030 mi) with 469 km (291 mi) perigee. The orbital period was 51.3 hours. During its lifetime, the orbital inclination of the plane of the spacecraft's orbit to the Earth's equator was of 89.80°. The spacecraft's axis of rotation at launch was inertially fixed in its orbital plane, directed towards a constant right ascension and declination, and nearly parallel to the Earth's equatorial plane.

== Results ==
In 1992, Dr. James Van Allen (Hawkeye Project Scientist) and the other Hawkeye principal investigators provided the National Space Science Data Center (NSSDC) with the high-resolution digital data (referred to as Master Science Files) from Explorer 52 (Hawkeye-1). Recognizing the uniqueness of this data, the NSSDC has placed the entire Hawkeye data set in its online archive.

== See also ==
- Explorer 20
- Explorer 25
- Explorer 40
- Explorer program
