= HCMM (disambiguation) =

HCMM may refer to:

- Aden Adde International Airport (ICAO: HCMM)
- Heat Capacity Mapping Mission
- Honourable Company of Master Mariners
