= Explorer 23 =

NASA satellite of the Explorer program

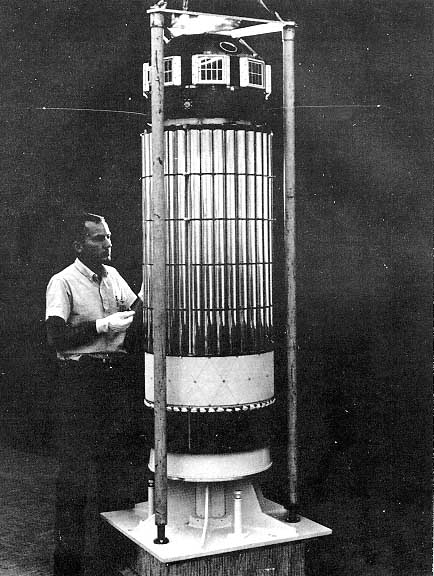
- Explorer 23 satellite
- Names: S-55C; NASA S-55C
- Mission type: Micrometeoroid research
- Operator: NASA
- COSPAR ID: 1964-074A
- SATCAT no.: 00924
- Mission duration: 1 year (achieved)

Spacecraft properties
- Spacecraft: Explorer S-55
- Bus: S-55
- Manufacturer: Goddard Space Flight Center
- Launch mass: 133.8 kg (295 lb)
- Dimensions: 61 × 192 cm (24 × 76 in) cylinder
- Power: Solar cells and nickel-cadmium batteries

Start of mission
- Launch date: 6 November 1964, 12:02:01 GMT
- Rocket: Scout X-1 (S-133R)
- Launch site: Wallops Flight Facility, LA-3
- Contractor: Vought
- Entered service: 6 November 1964

End of mission
- Last contact: 7 November 1965
- Decay date: 29 June 1983

Orbital parameters
- Reference system: Geocentric orbit
- Regime: Low Earth orbit
- Perigee altitude: 451 km (280 mi)
- Apogee altitude: 865 km (537 mi)
- Inclination: 51.90°
- Period: 97.90 minutes

Instruments
- Cadmium Sulfide Cells; Capacitor Detectors; Impact Detectors; Pressurized Cells

Explorer 23 (also called S-55C) was the last of three S-55 NASA micrometeoroid satellites launched as part of the Explorer program. Its purpose was to obtain data on the near-earth meteoroid environment, thus providing an accurate estimate of the probability of penetration in spacecraft structures by meteoroids and allowing a more confident definition of the penetration flux-material thickness relation to be derived.

== Spacecraft ==
The cylindrically shaped spacecraft, about 61 cm × 234 cm (24 in × 92 in), was built around the burned-out fourth stage of the Scout launch vehicle, which remained as part of the orbiting satellite. Explorer 23 carried stainless steel pressurized-cell penetration detectors, impact detectors, and cadmium sulfide cell detectors to obtain data on the size, number, distribution, and momentum of dust particles in the near-earth environment. In addition, the spacecraft was designed to provide data on the effects of the space environment on the operation of capacitor penetration detectors and solar cell power supplies. The spacecraft mass, neglecting the fourth stage vehicle hardware and motor, was 133.8 kg (295 lb).

== Experiments ==
=== Cadmium Sulfide Cells ===
The objective of this experiment was to determine the size of penetrating meteoroids by measuring the size of holes produced by the impacts in two thicknesses of a plastic film using two light-sensitive Cadmium Sulfide (CdS) cells. The cells were both mounted on the forward face of the spacecraft, one beneath a sheet of 6.35-micron-thick PET film and the other beneath a sheet of 3.18-micron-thick PET film. Each detector provided 24-cm^{2} of surface area exposed to meteoroids. Each sheet of PET film had a thin coating of aluminum deposited on both sides. Penetration of the aluminized PET sheets would allow sunlight (direct or reflected) to illuminate the cell and reduce its resistance, the cell being calibrated to relate the resistance change to accumulative hole sizes in the PET film. Prior to liftoff, all detectors were functioning properly; however, on the first interrogation made shortly after fourth stage burnout, it was found that the CdS cells were saturated with light. Apparently the aluminized PET film covers were damaged during launch, preventing data acquisition.

=== Capacitor Detectors ===
The purpose of the experiment was to determine whether the space radiation environment had any adverse effects on the operation of the capacitor as a meteoroid-penetration detector. Observations in the laboratory indicated that energetic electrons in space might collect in the dielectric and produce false penetration counts. The instrumentation consisted essentially of two capacitors made up of a thin film polymer dielectric (bilaminate 3.8-micron thick, half-hard, type 302), which served as one electrode. A copper layer, about 0.65-micron thick, was vacuum-deposited on the outer surface of the dielectric, thus permitting it to serve as the second electrode. The capacitors were each mounted on a 0.63-cm-thick layer of polyurethane foam support by means of a 2.5-micron adhesive. The foam support, in turn, was seated in a laminated fiberglass tray that served as the mounting fixture. A penetration into the charged capacitor by a projectile caused the capacitor to be momentarily shorted and discharged. This discharge was detected and stored in a counter for later transmission. The conduction path dissipated in less than 1 microsecond and allowed the capacitor to recharge and detect any additional penetrations. Two discharges were recorded for one of the detectors during the 365-day lifetime of the experiment (6 November 1964 to 5 November 1965). No discharges were recorded for the second capacitor. More refined laboratory tests, however, revealed that the number of radiation-induced pulses would be about the same as or less than the number resulting from actual punctures, thus making it difficult, if not impossible, to distinguish between the two. Hence, the origin of the two counts (electron or meteoroid) could not be determined. It was determined from the data, however, that any radiation-induced pulses greater than 2 volts were at a minimum and would not likely affect the meteoroid flux data to any great extent, particularly when the penetration rates were relatively high.

=== Impact Detectors ===
The mass distribution of meteoroids in space was determined by an impact-detection system consisting of 24 triangular 0.13-cm-thick 6061 aluminium alloy sounding boards. Each one had a piezoelectric transducer mounted on the center of the sounding board underside. The detectors provided 144-cm^{2} of area exposed to meteoroids. Four groups of six electrically parallel sounding boards were mounted around the periphery of the spacecraft. When a meteoroid impacted on a sounding board, an electrical signal was produced from the transducer. It was then amplified, threshold-detected, counted, and stored until readout. The amplifier for each group had three stages of amplification, which corresponded to three levels of momentum—low, medium, and high. By assigning a velocity to the particles impacting on the sounding boards in space, the system output was directly related to the threshold levels of particle mass. The system sensitivity was adjusted during final calibrations so that all 24 sounding boards acted as a single detector for all three sensitivity levels. The momentum thresholds obtained by calibration for the low, medium, and high ranges were 1.2E-4, 8.E-6, and 3.E-7 newton-seconds, respectively. The data obtained showed 14,169 counts, 218 counts, and 2 counts for the high-, medium-, and low-sensitivity systems, respectively, over a 1-year period (6 November 1964 to 5 November 1965).

=== Pressurized Cells ===
The frequency at which two different thicknesses of stainless steel were punctured in space was obtained by use of 216 stainless steel cells with a thickness of 9.87E-3 cm. The cells were pressurized with helium (absolute pressure of 1300 mm mercury (Hg)) and mounted in seven rows around the periphery of the spacecraft. The test material was half-hard type 302 stainless steel coated with a 1.4-micron-thick thermal balance cover consisting of successive layers of chromium, silicon monoxide, aluminum, and silicon monoxide. Of the 210 active cells (six cells were inactive because of telemetry limitations), 70 had 2.54 ± 2.5-micron-thick test material, and 40 had 50.8 ± 2.5-micron-thick test material. The total exposed area of each class of detector was 0.69 cm^{2} and 1.38 cm^{2}, respectively. When a cell was punctured the gas leaked out, and the drop in pressure caused a switch to open indicating that a puncture had occurred. The frequency at which cells lost pressure was a direct measure of the frequency at which the test material was being punctured by meteoroids. Although the cells could not detect any additional punctures, they did provide a permanent record of the initial puncture. The experiment operated satisfactorily during its 365-day life, recording 50 punctures of the 25-micron cells and 74 punctures of the 50-micron cells. The data obtained were in good agreement with puncture rates obtained in previous satellite experiments.

== Results ==
The spacecraft operated satisfactorily during its 1-year life (6 November 1964 to 7 November 1965), and all mission objectives were accomplished, except for the cadmium sulfide (CdS) cell detector experiment, which was damaged on liftoff and provided no data.

== See also ==
- Explorer 13
- Explorer 16
- Explorer program
