= Explorer 25 =

NASA satellite of the Explorer program

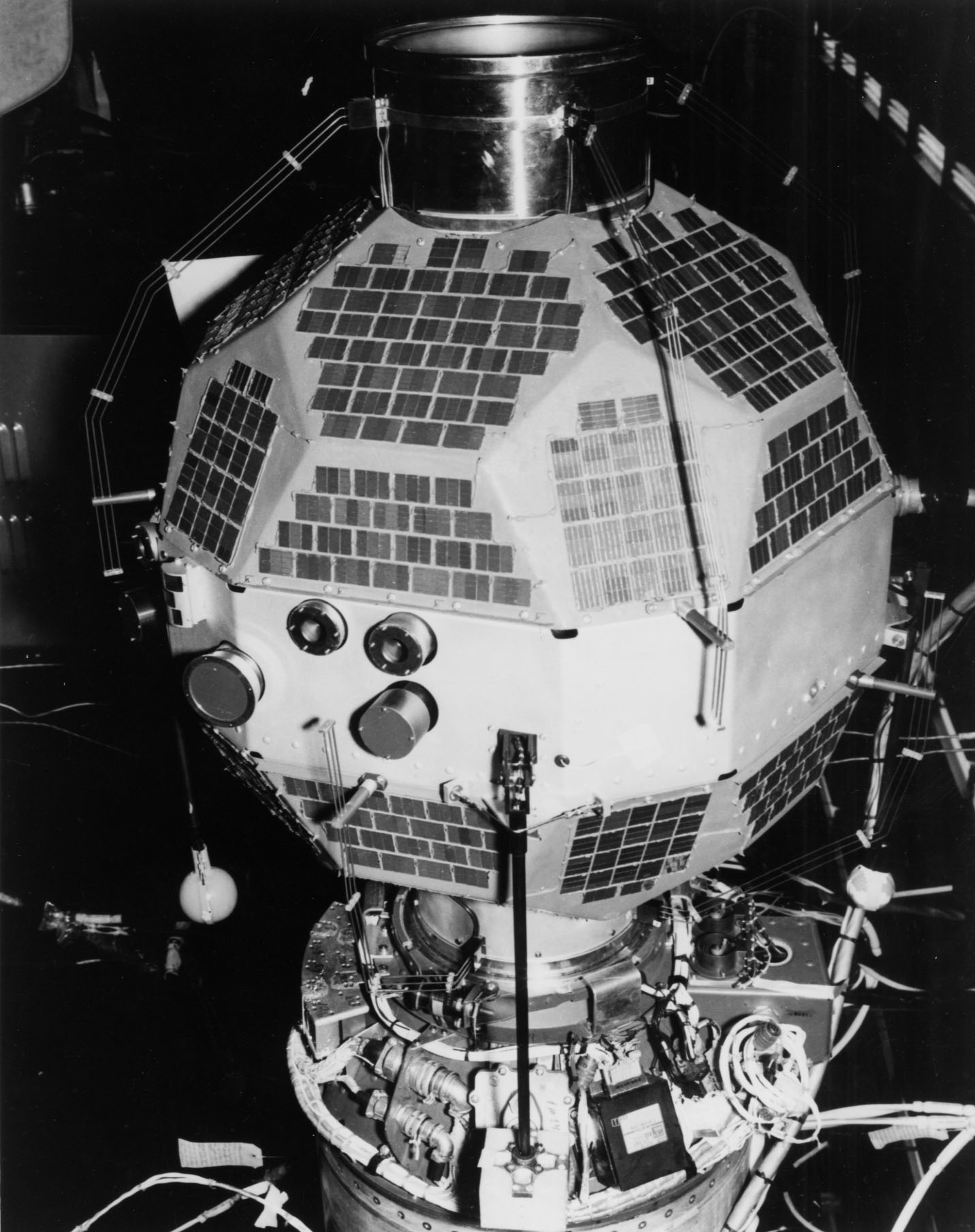
- Explorer 25 (Injun 4) satellite
- Names: Injun 4 IE-B; Ionospheric Explorer-B; Explorer XXV
- Mission type: Ionospheric research
- Operator: NASA
- COSPAR ID: 1964-076B
- SATCAT no.: 00932
- Mission duration: 20 months (planned); 60 years, 6 months, 15 days (in orbit)

Spacecraft properties
- Spacecraft: Explorer XXV
- Spacecraft type: Explorer
- Bus: Injun
- Manufacturer: University of Iowa
- Launch mass: 40 kg (88 lb)
- Power: Solar cells and rechargeable batteries

Start of mission
- Launch date: 21 November 1964, 17:09:39 GMT
- Rocket: Scout X-4 (S-135R)
- Launch site: Vandenberg, PALC-D
- Contractor: Vought
- Entered service: 21 November 1964

End of mission
- Last contact: December 1966

Orbital parameters
- Reference system: Geocentric orbit
- Regime: Low Earth orbit
- Perigee altitude: 522 km (324 mi)
- Apogee altitude: 2,494 km (1,550 mi)
- Inclination: 81.40°
- Period: 116.30 minutes

Instruments
- Cadmium Sulfide Detectors; Geiger–Müller Counter; Plastic Scintillator Particle Detectors; Solid-State Detector; Spherical Retarding Potential Analyzer

Explorer 25 (or Injun 4), was a NASA magnetically aligned satellite launched simultaneously with Explorer 24 (AD-B) (Air Density experiment) using a Scout X-4 launch vehicle. This was NASA's first dual-satellite launch. The satellite's primary mission was to make measurements of the influx of energetic particles into the atmosphere of Earth and to study atmospheric heating and the increase in scale height which have been correlated with geomagnetic activity. Studies of the natural and artificial trapped Van Allen radiation belts were also conducted. A biaxial fluxgate magnetometer was used to monitor the orientation of the spacecraft with respect to the local magnetic field.

== Spacecraft ==
Explorer 25 was equipped with a tape recorder and analog-to-digital converters. The satellite power was derived from solar cells and rechargeable batteries. A transmitter operating in an AM mode at carrier frequency 136.29 MHz was used to transmit real-time data, and one operating in a PM mode at 136.86-MHz was used to transmit tape recorder data.

== Experiments ==
=== Cadmium Sulfide Detectors ===
This experiment was designed to measure precipitating and trapped particle fluxes. Four (Cadmium sulfide) CdS-type particle detectors were used for this purpose, one at a pitch angle of 90°, one at 125° and two at 160° (one with and one without a magnetic deflection within the entrance aperture). Orientation was referred to the direction of the local magnetic field line such that 0° corresponded to a detector looking downward towards the Earth in the northern hemisphere. The detector accumulators were sampled sequentially every 8 seconds. The detectors were flown to yield total flux measurements for electrons (E>100 eV) and protons (E>100 eV). Extremely high background counting rates encountered during the flight hindered analysis of the data.

=== Geiger–Müller Counter ===
This experiment was designed to measure the net down-flux of particles from the trapping region and the intensities of geomagnetically trapped particles at low altitudes, over a wide range of latitudes and longitudes and a long period of time, and to study the long-term decay of electrons in the artificially produced "Starfish Prime" radiation belt. Four Eon 6213 type directional Geiger–Müller counters (GM) were used for energy flux measurements. These counters were sensitive to electrons (E>40 keV) and protons (E>600 keV). The detectors were arranged to detect particles with pitch angles from 0° to 180° in four segments centered at pitch angles of 35°, 90°, 125° and 160°. Orientation was referred to the direction of the local magnetic field line such that 0° corresponded to a detector looking downward towards the Earth in the northern hemisphere. The 6213 GM counters at 35° and 160° functioned normally throughout the flight, while the counter at 90° operated properly only until about mid-March 1965. Periods of intermittent operation commenced at that time due to continuous discharge of the GM counter, and the counter failed completely in June 1965. The fourth counter, at 125°, malfunctioned shortly after launch and yielded no useful data. One heavily shielded omnidirectional Eon 6213 type counter was used for the study of the Starfish radiation. This counter was sensitive to protons (E>70 MeV) but insensitive to electrons except via bremsstrahlung (E>1 MeV). One omnidirectional 5112 type GM counter of the kind flown on the Explorer 7 satellite and one omnidirectional 7302 type GM counter were used for monitoring the natural radiation zones and cosmic rays. The 5112 GM counter was sensitive to protons (E>27 MeV) but insensitive to electrons except via bremsstrahlung (E>1 MeV). The four directional type 6213 GM counter accumulators were sampled sequentially every 4 seconds, and the other GM counter accumulators were sampled sequentially every 8 seconds.

=== Plastic Scintillator Particle Detectors ===
This experiment was designed to measure the directional fluxes of electrons (E>5 keV) mirroring at satellite altitudes and being precipitated into the Earth's upper atmosphere. Two plastic scintillator particle detectors were used. One detector, which measured electrons with pitch angles about 90° ± 15°, operated normally until late January 1965. An apparent intermittent failure in the detector power supply decreased further observations to only brief periods throughout the active life of the satellite. The other detector, which measured electrons with pitch angles of about 40° ± 15°, operated normally throughout the 20-month life of the satellite. Orientation was referred to the direction of the local magnetic field line such that 0° corresponded to a detector looking downward towards the Earth in the Northern Hemisphere. The detector accumulators were sampled sequentially every 8 seconds.

=== Solid-State Detector ===
This experiment was designed to detect protons and alpha particles in the outer zone and in solar cosmic-ray events at low altitudes and high latitudes. The experiment used a totally depleted directional silicon surface barrier detector in the form of a thin circular disk. The detector was located inside a conical collimator with full vertex angle of 40° and was oriented at 90° to the satellite symmetry axis. Separate determinations of proton and alpha particle fluxes were made in the energy ranges 0.52 to 4 MeV/nucleon and 0.9 to 1.8 MeV/nucleon, respectively. The detector was insensitive to electron fluxes in the radiation zones. The detector accumulators were sampled sequentially every 4 seconds, and the detector performed normally through 19 July 1966.

== Results ==
Stable magnetic alignment was not achieved until late in February 1965. The satellite sent radiation data until December 1966 and is expected to be in orbit for about 200 years.

== See also ==
- Injun satellites
- Explorer 20
- Explorer program
