= PRIMA (space telescope) =

NASA space telescope of the Explorer program

- Artist's illustration of PRIMA
- Mission type: Far-infrared astronomy
- Operator: JPL / Goddard Space Flight Center
- Website: https://prima.ipac.caltech.edu/
- Mission duration: 5 years (planned)

Spacecraft properties
- Manufacturer: BAE Systems
- Payload mass: ~ 3401 kg
- Power: 2700 watts

Start of mission
- Launch date: 2033 (planned)

Orbital parameters
- Reference system: Sun-Earth L_{2} orbit

Main telescope
- Type: Korsch telescope
- Diameter: 1.8 m (5.9 ft)
- Wavelengths: 24 to 261 μm (far infrared)

Instruments
- FIRESS; PRIMAger

PRIMA (PRobe far-Infrared Mission for Astrophysics) is a planned NASA far-infrared space telescope scheduled to launch in 2033. The spacecraft will be the first mission in the Probe Explorers class of the Explorers program.

== Observatory ==
The telescope will be made entirely of aluminum and will be cryogenically cooled to 4.5 K using a closed-cycle gaseous Helium-3-based cryocooler to reduce thermal noise and greatly increase sensitivity. The spacecraft will utilise the BAE Systems Large Configurable Platform bus, a hydrazine monopropellant propulsion system, and a 14 m^{2} solar array.

=== Instruments ===
The spacecraft will carry two primary instruments: FIRESS, a high resolution spectrometer intended for multimode spectroscopy; and PRIMAger, an imaging polarimeter intended to map large areas of the sky.

==== FIRESS ====
FIRESS will operate from 24 to 235 μm. It will use four wideband grating modules covering four distinct bands (24 μm to 43 μm, 42 μm to 76 μm, 74 μm to 134 μm, and 130 μm to 235 μm), as well as kinetic inductance detectors (KIDs) for more sensitive photon measurement. It will also contain a Fourier Transform Module (FTM), with the intention of increasing spectral resolving power.

==== PRIMAger ====
PRIMAger will operate from 24 to 261 μm using simultaneous observations of two focal planes of KIDs. It is intended to enable far-infrared hyperspectral imaging, with a design emphasis on mapping and analysis of large samples of galaxies.

== Mission ==
The mission has several scientific goals. It is intended to satisfy several goals laid out in the 2020 Astronomy and Astrophysics Decadal Survey, namely analysis of the process of planet formation by studying the chemical signature of water in protoplanetary disks, investigation of the interdependent evolution processes of galaxies and supermassive black holes by measuring the formation rates of stars and accretion rates of black holes in different galaxy populations, and survey of local galaxies to analyze the buildup of dust and heavy elements.

The mission is expected to cost $1.2 billion, excluding launch costs.

== See also ==
- Explorer program – Ongoing NASA space exploration program
- Infrared astronomy
- Herschel Space Observatory – ESA space telescope in service 2009–2013
