= Contribution to ARIEL Spectroscopy of Exoplanets =

Infrared spectrometer component

Contribution to ARIEL Spectroscopy of Exoplanets (CASE) is a detector subsystem contribution to an infrared spectrometer instrument for the planned European ARIEL space telescope. It is being developed by NASA as a contribution to the European Space Agency (ESA) project to add scientific capabilities to the space telescope to observe the chemical composition of the atmospheres of exoplanets, as well exoplanetary metallicities. The ARIEL spacecraft with CASE on board is planned to launch in 2029.

== Overview ==
ARIEL will be able to study the chemical "fingerprints", or spectra of an exoplanet's atmosphere as the light of its host star passes through the exoplanet's atmosphere. The addition of CASE will enable ARIEL to observe clouds and hazes, which help establish planetary climate, and provide a more comprehensive picture of the exoplanet atmospheres ARIEL observes.

The CASE instrument consists of two detectors and associated electronics that are sensitive to light at near-infrared (NIR) wavelengths as well as visible light. The detectors and its associated electronics are the same that NASA is contributing to ESA's Euclid mission, being a mosaic of 4×4 Teledyne H2RG detectors sensitive to near-infrared light radiation (1.0-2.0 μm) with 65 million pixels. CASE will be a subsystem of ARIEL's FGS instrument, which is an infrared spectrometer that operates in two channels (0.50-1.2 μm photometry; 1.25-1.95 μm spectroscopy).

CASE is an astrophysics Mission of Opportunity by the Explorers Program. The Principal Investigator of CASE is Mark Swain, at the Jet Propulsion Laboratory (JPL). The ARIEL spacecraft with CASE on board is planned to launch in 2029.

== See also ==
- Extraterrestrial atmosphere
