= Explorer 41 =

NASA satellite of the Explorer program

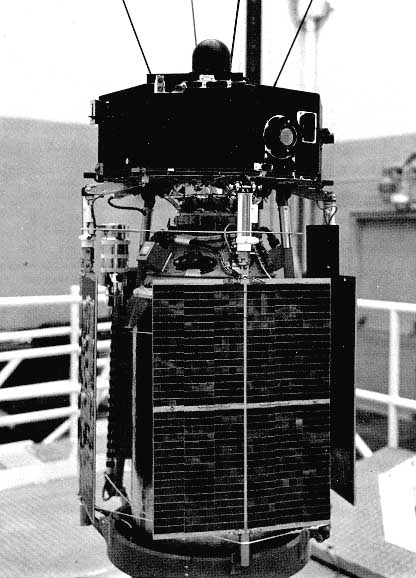
- Explorer 41 satellite
- Names: IMP-G; IMP-5; Interplanetary Monitoring Platform-5
- Mission type: Space physics
- Operator: NASA
- COSPAR ID: 1969-053A
- SATCAT no.: 03990
- Mission duration: 3.5 years (achieved)

Spacecraft properties
- Spacecraft: Explorer XLI
- Spacecraft type: Interplanetary Monitoring Platform
- Bus: IMP
- Manufacturer: Goddard Space Flight Center
- Launch mass: 175 kg (386 lb)

Start of mission
- Launch date: 21 June 1969, 08:47:58 GMT
- Rocket: Thor-Delta E1 (Thor 482 / Delta 069)
- Launch site: Vandenberg, SLC-2W
- Contractor: Douglas Aircraft Company
- Entered service: 21 June 1969

End of mission
- Last contact: 23 December 1972
- Decay date: 23 December 1972

Orbital parameters
- Reference system: Geocentric orbit
- Regime: Highly elliptical orbit
- Perigee altitude: 3,920 km (2,440 mi)
- Apogee altitude: 172,912 km (107,443 mi)
- Inclination: 85.10°
- Period: 4840.90 minutes

Instruments
Instruments
- Channeltron Electron Detector
- Cosmic-Ray Anisotropy
- Cosmic-Ray Energy versus Energy Loss
- Cosmic-Ray Proton (R vs DE/DX)
- Electrostatic Analyzer
- Ion Chamber
- Low-Energy Proton and Alpha Detector
- Low-Energy Proton and Electron Differential Energy Analyzer (LEPEDEA)
- Low-Energy Proton and Electron Differential Energy Analyzer (LEPEDEA 2)
- Low-Energy Solid-State Telescope
- Solar Proton Monitoring Experiment
- Triaxial Fluxgate Magnetometer

Explorer 41, also called IMP-G and IMP-5, was a NASA satellite launched as part of the Explorers program. Explorer 41 launched on 21 June 1969 from Vandenberg AFB, California, with a Thor-Delta E1 launch vehicle. Explorer 41 was the seventh satellite launched as part of the overall Interplanetary Monitoring Platform series, though it received the post-launch designation "IMP-5" because two previous flights had used the "AIMP" ("Anchored IMP") designation instead. It was preceded by the second of those flights, Explorer 35 ([A]IMP-E / AIMP-2), launched in July 1967. Its predecessor in the strict IMP series of launches was Explorer 34, launched in May 1967, which shared a similar design to Explorer 41. The next launch of an IMP satellite was Explorer 43 (IMP-I / IMP-6) in 1971.

== Spacecraft and mission ==
Explorer 41 (IMP-G) was a spin-stabilized satellite placed into a high-inclination, highly elliptical orbit to measure energetic particles, magnetic fields, and plasma in cislunar space. The line of apsides and the satellite spin vector were within a few degrees of being parallel and normal, respectively, to the ecliptic plane. Initial local time of apogee was about 13:00 hours. Initial satellite spin rate was 27.5 rpm. The basic telemetry sequence was 20.48-seconds. Data transmission was nearly 100% for the spacecraft life except for the interval from 15 November 1971 to 1 February 1972, when data acquisition was limited to the vicinity of the magnetotail neutral sheet.

== Experiments ==
=== Channeltron Electron Detector ===
The instrumentation for this experiment consisted of a parallel-plate electric-field analyzer and two funnel-shaped channel multipliers. The parallel-plate analyzer was used as a discriminatory device. One of the channel multipliers responded to electrons with energies between 2.5 and 7.5-keV, and the other responded to electrons with energies between 7.5 and 12.5-keV. The acceptance cones for the channel multipliers had full-angles of approximately 30° with axes of symmetry 60° off the spacecraft spin axis. Due to high background count rates, only data of low quality were obtained.

=== Cosmic-Ray Anisotropy ===
This experiment was designed to study solar particle anisotropy and its variation with time. A telescope, consisting of three aligned detectors (A-solid state, B-plastic scintillator, C-Caesium iodide (CsI) scintillator) and a plastic scintillator anticoincidence shield (D), was used to measure protons from 0.8 to 7.0-MeV (counts in A but not in B) and from 35 to 110-MeV (coincident counts in B (dE/dx) and C (total E) but not in D). Pulse-height analysis yielded six-point spectra within each of these two energy intervals. Protons from 7 to 55-MeV (counts in A and B) were also recorded without spectral information. In addition, a proportional counter provided directional measurements of X-rays with energies above 2-keV and electrons above 70-keV. Counts in each particle counting mode were obtained in each of eight octants in the ecliptic plane. X-ray counts were obtained in the solar octant. A complete set of count rates and spectral data was obtained every 81.9-seconds.

=== Cosmic-Ray Energy versus Energy Loss ===
This experiment used a dE/dx versus E telescope with thin and thick CsI scintillators (one each) and an anticoincidence plastic scintillation counter. The telescope axis was parallel to the spacecraft spin axis. Counts of particles penetrating the thin CsI scintillator and stopping in the thick CsI scintillator were accumulated for two 4.48-seconds intervals each 2.73-minutes. The relative contribution to the count rate of various species (electrons between 2.7 and 21.5-MeV, nuclei with charge = 1 or 2, atomic mass = 1, 2, 3 or 4, and energy between 18.7 and 81.6-MeV/nucleon) and energy spectral information were determined by 1024-channel pulse-height analysis performed simultaneously on the output of both CsI scintillators 16 times every 2.73-minutes. In addition, counts of electrons between 0.3 and 0.9-MeV stopping in the thin scintillator were also obtained once each 2.73-minutes. The experiment functioned well.

=== Cosmic-Ray Proton (R vs DE/DX) ===
This experiment was designed to measure separately the contributions of solar nuclei and galactic nuclei (Z<14) using a combination solid-state and Cherenkov counter cosmic ray telescope. The detector was designed for energy loss vs range or total energy measurements for protons (differential measurements between 0.8 and 119-MeV and an integral measurement between 119-MeV and 1-GeV). Similar differential energy measurements of He and higher Z nuclei were made between 3 MeV/nucleon and 1 GeV/nucleon. The detector was oriented perpendicular to the satellite spin axis. The detector accumulators were telemetered four times every 20.48-seconds. Each accumulation was 4.8-seconds long (spacecraft initial spin period was about 2.2-seconds). The output from the three 256-channel pulse-height analyzers was obtained every 5.12-seconds and was telemetered along with the detector accumulators. The D3 element of the telescope became noisy on 29 September 1969, and the condition continued until the spacecraft emerged from first shadow on 5 January 1970. Otherwise the experiment performed normally until the spacecraft decayed from orbit on 23 December 1972.

=== Electrostatic Analyzer ===
An electrostatic analyzer and an E-cross-B velocity selector normal to the spacecraft spin axis were used to separately determine proton and alpha particle spectra in the solar wind. For each species, measurements in the energy per charge range 310 to 5100-eV were made at 14 points logarithmically equispaced in energy. During individual spacecraft rotations, counts were obtained in each of sixteen 22.5-deg sectors for a given species and energy. The sum of these counts, the sum of the squares of these counts, and the sector number of maximum counting were telemetered to Earth. After successive 61.44-seconds spectral determinations for protons and alpha particles, 15 consecutive readings for protons at 1408 eV were obtained. A period of 3.07-minutes separated two spectra of the same species. The instrument operated intermittently.

=== Ion Chamber ===
This experiment was designed to measure energetic charged particle populations in and beyond the Earth's outer magnetosphere and the dynamic processes that influence these populations. The instrumentation consisted of a 10 cm (3.9 in)-diameter Neher-type integrating ionization chamber and three pairs of Geiger–Müller tubes (GM). The ionization chamber responded omnidirectionally to electrons above 700-keV, protons above 12-MeV, and X-rays above 20-keV. Each pair of GM tubes had one member normal to, and the other parallel to, the spacecraft spin axis. All but one tube had 70° full-width acceptance cones. The members of one pair of GM tubes responded to electrons above 80-keV and protons above 1.5-MeV. The second pair of GM tubes responded to electrons above 45-keV scattered from gold foils. The third tube, normal to the spin axis, responded to electrons above 120-keV, protons above 2.3-MeV, and X-rays from 3 to 20-keV (0.1% efficiency). The other member of the third set of GM tubes responded to electrons above 18 keV and protons above 250 keV. Pulses from the ionization chamber and counts from each of the GM tubes were accumulated for 9.92-seconds and read out four times each 40.96-seconds. The experiment performed normally from launch until the spacecraft decayed from orbit on 23 December 1972, except that the ionization chamber operated intermittently throughout the mission.

=== Low-Energy Proton and Alpha Detector ===
This experiment used a dE/dx versus E telescope with one thin and two thick surface-barrier, solid-state detectors and an anticoincidence plastic scintillator counter. The two thick detectors acted together as one detector. The telescope axis was perpendicular to the spacecraft spin axis. Counts of particles penetrating the thin detector and stopping in a thick detector were accumulated for a 4.48-seconds interval once each 2.73-minutes for each of two counting modes (counting modes are defined with respect to the energy deposited in the thin dE/dx detector). Good separation of protons and alpha particles was achieved by this mode distinction. The relative contribution to each count rate of protons and alpha particles with energies between 4.2 and 19.1-MeV/nucleon and energy spectral information were determined by 1024-channel pulse-height analysis performed simultaneously on the output of the solid-state detectors four times every 2.73-minutes for each of the two threshold modes. Protons stopping in the thin detector (and particles penetrating it) were measured by passing the output signal through an eight-level energy threshold discriminator. The eight corresponding proton energies ran from 0.6 to about 4-MeV. Data from any one level were transmitted once every 2.73-minutes. There were also two solid-state detectors that looked along the spacecraft spin axis and that were identical except for differences in the covering foil thicknesses. Both detectors responded to electrons in the 80-to 200-keV range. One responded to protons between 83-keV and 2-MeV and the other to protons between 200-keV and 2-MeV. Spectral information was gathered by subjecting the output signals from each detector to eight-level energy threshold discrimination. Data from each of the eight levels and each of the two detectors were transmitted once each 5.46-minutes. Except for a 2-week period in March 1970 when the telescope data were noisy, all the detectors functioned normally.

=== Low-Energy Proton and Electron Differential Energy Analyzer (LEPEDEA) ===
This experiment, which was similar to the University of Iowa experiment on Explorer 34, was designed to measure separately low-energy electron and proton intensities inside the magnetosphere and in the interplanetary region. The detector system consisted of a cylindrical electrostatic analyzer (LEPEDEA detector) and Bendix Corporation continuous channel multiplier (channeltron) array, and an Anton 213 Geiger–Müller tube designed to survey the intensities of electrons with E>40 keV in the outer magnetosphere. The electrostatic analyzer was capable of measuring the angular distributions and differential energy spectra of proton and electron intensities, separately, within 15 contiguous energy intervals over the energy ranges 25 eV to 47-keV and 33-eV to 57-keV. The analyzer accumulators were read out four times every 20.48-seconds. Each accumulation was about 480 ms long (spacecraft spin period was initially 2.2-seconds). A complete scan of the spectrum for four directions in a plane perpendicular to the spacecraft spin axis required 307.2-seconds. For each energy interval, the detector response for four approximately 60° swaths of the angular distribution was telemetered. The instruments performed normally until the spacecraft decayed from orbit on 23 December 1972.

=== Low-Energy Proton and Electron Differential Energy Analyzer (LEPEDEA 2) ===
This experiment was designed to observe positive ion intensities in the solar wind, within the magnetosheath, and in the geomagnetic tail using a modified low-energy proton and electron differential energy analyzer (LEPEDEA detector). The detector, which was composed of curved plate electrostatic analyzers and continuous channel multipliers ("channeltrons"), was designed to measure differential energy spectra and angular distributions of low-energy positive ions over the energy range 90-eV to 12-keV. The detector was an analog device and, therefore, was read continuously during the flight. Energy measurements were obtained within 32 individual energy intervals over the proposed range and at 16 Sun-referenced azimuthal directions perpendicular to the spacecraft spin axis for each energy interval. The experiment performed normally for about two and one half months from launch when the experiment power supply failed.

=== Low-Energy Solid-State Telescope ===
In this experiment, a four-element solid-state telescope with an acceptance cone half angle of 20° was mounted normal to the spacecraft spin axis. During each 2.73-minutes interval, 9.82-seconds accumulations were obtained in each of 16 distinct counting modes. These modes involved protons in ten energy intervals covering 0.5 to 20-MeV, alpha particles in six intervals covering 4 to 70-MeV, and electrons, deuterons, tritons, and helium-3 nuclei in the intervals 0.3 to 3, 5 to 20, 5.5 to 25, and 11 to 72-MeV, respectively. Onboard calibration checks were performed every 6 hours. The experiment performed normally until 30 January 1970, when a Goddard Space Flight Center (GSFC) power supply failure limited the useful data gathered to protons between 0.5 and 5-MeV, alpha particles between 4 and 18-MeV, and electrons between 0.3 and 3-MeV. No further experiment degradation occurred until the spacecraft decayed from orbit on 23 December 1972. This instrument was essentially the same as that flown by the Bell Labs group on Explorer 34.

=== Solar Proton Monitoring Experiment ===
The solar proton monitoring experiment utilized four separate detectors, each of which used one or more solid-state sensors. Three detectors measured the omnidirectional fluxes of protons and alpha particles with energy per nucleon values above 10, 30, and 60-MeV. Alpha particle contributions to the total count rates were generally less than 10%. These detectors were also sensitive to electrons above approximately 0.7, 2.0, and 8.0-MeV, respectively. The 10-MeV channel was sampled for two 19.2-seconds intervals every 163.8-seconds and the 30- and 60-MeV channels for one 19.2-seconds interval every 163.8-seconds. Resultant hourly averaged fluxes have been published in Solar-Geophysical Data (National Oceanic and Atmospheric Administration (NOAA), Boulder, Colorado) on a rapid basis. The fourth detector had a 60° full look angle normal to the spacecraft spin axis. Each of two discrimination levels was sampled for two 19.2-seconds intervals every 163.8-seconds. Fluxes of 1- to 10-MeV/nucleon protons and alpha particles were measured in the lower and upper discrimination states, respectively. All detectors functioned normally from launch until the spacecraft decayed from orbit (from 21 June 1969 to 23 December 1972).

=== Triaxial Fluxgate Magnetometer ===
A boom-mounted triaxial fluxgate magnetometer measured magnetic fields in the interplanetary medium, in the magnetosheath, and in the geomagnetic tail. The magnetometer had dynamic ranges of plus or minus 40-nT and ± 200-nT with respective sensitivities of ± 0.2 nT and ± 1.0 nT. Automatic onboard range selection was included. Measurement of the energy spectra of magnetic field fluctuations was accomplished through a computation of the autocorrelation function in an onboard digital processor. The experiment functioned normally from launch until the spacecraft decayed from orbit (21 June 1969 to 23 December 1972).

== Solar storm of August 1972 ==
It recorded important data on one of the most potent solar proton events of the Space Age in early August 1972.

== End of mission ==
Explorer 41 functioned very well from launch until it decayed from orbit on 23 December 1972.

== See also ==
- Explorer program
