= Full-sky Astrometric Mapping Explorer =

NASA satellite of the Explorer program

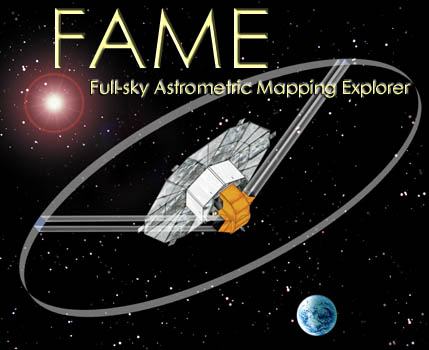
Full-sky Astrometric Mapping Explorer (or FAME)

Full-sky Astrometric Mapping Explorer (or FAME) was a NASA proposed astrometric satellite designed to determine with unprecedented accuracy the positions, distances, and motions of 40 million stars within our galactic neighborhood (distances by stellar parallax possible). This database was to allow astronomers to accurately determine the distance to all of the stars on this side of the Milky Way galaxy, detect large planets and planetary systems around stars within 1,000 light years of the Sun, and measure the amount of dark matter in the galaxy from its influence on stellar motions. It was to be a collaborative effort between the United States Naval Observatory (USNO) and several other institutions. FAME would have measured stellar positions to less than 50 microarcseconds. The NASA MIDEX mission was scheduled for launch in 2004. In January 2002, however, NASA abruptly cancelled this mission, mainly due to concerns about costs, which had grown from US$160 million initially to US$220 million.

This would have been an improvement over the High Precision Parallax Collecting Satellite (Hipparcos) which operated 1989–1993 and produced various star catalogs. Astrometric parallax measurements form part of the cosmic distance ladder, and can also be measured by other space telescopes such as Hubble (HST) or ground-based telescopes to varying degrees of precision.

Compared to the FAME accuracy of 50 microarcseconds, the Gaia mission is planning 10 microarcseconds accuracy, for mapping stellar parallax up to a distance of tens of thousands of light-years from Earth.

== See also ==
- Explorer program
- Gaia (spacecraft)
- Nano-JASMINE
