= Explorers Program =

Ongoing NASA space exploration program

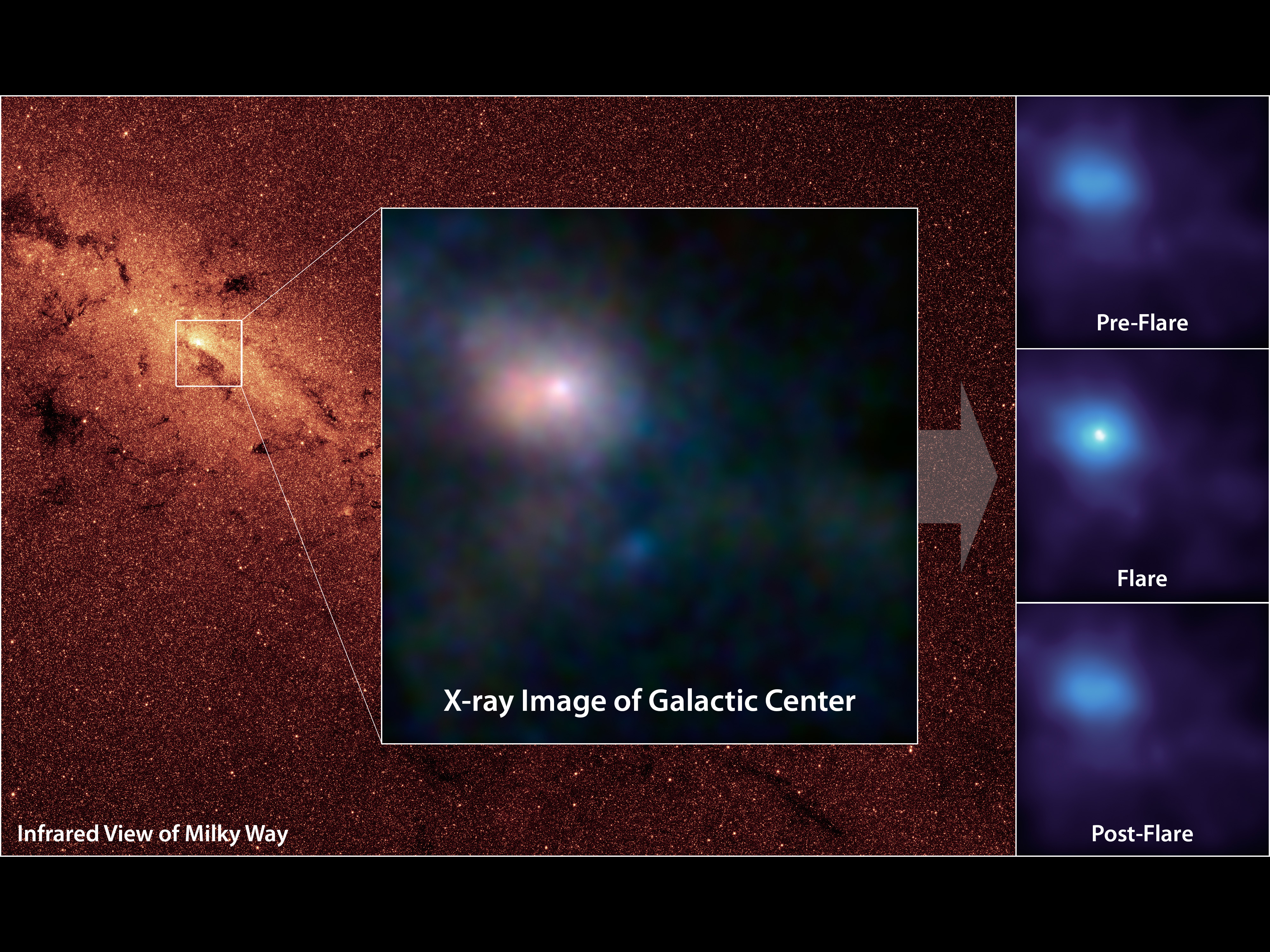
An Explorer mission observes Sagittarius A*, the Milky Way's central black hole, flaring.

The Explorers Program is a NASA exploration program that provides flight opportunities for physics, geophysics, heliophysics, and astrophysics investigations from space. Launched in 1958, Explorer 1 was the first spacecraft of the United States to achieve orbit. Over 90 space missions have been launched since. Starting with Explorer 6, it has been operated by NASA, with regular collaboration with a variety of other institutions, including many international partners.

Launchers for the Explorers Program have included Juno I, Juno II, various Thor, Scout, Delta and Pegasus launch vehicles, and Falcon 9.

The program has four classes: Probe Explorers, Medium-Class Explorers (MIDEX), Small Explorers (SMEX), and University-Class Explorers (UNEX), with select Missions of Opportunity operated with other agencies.

== History ==
=== Early Explorer satellites ===
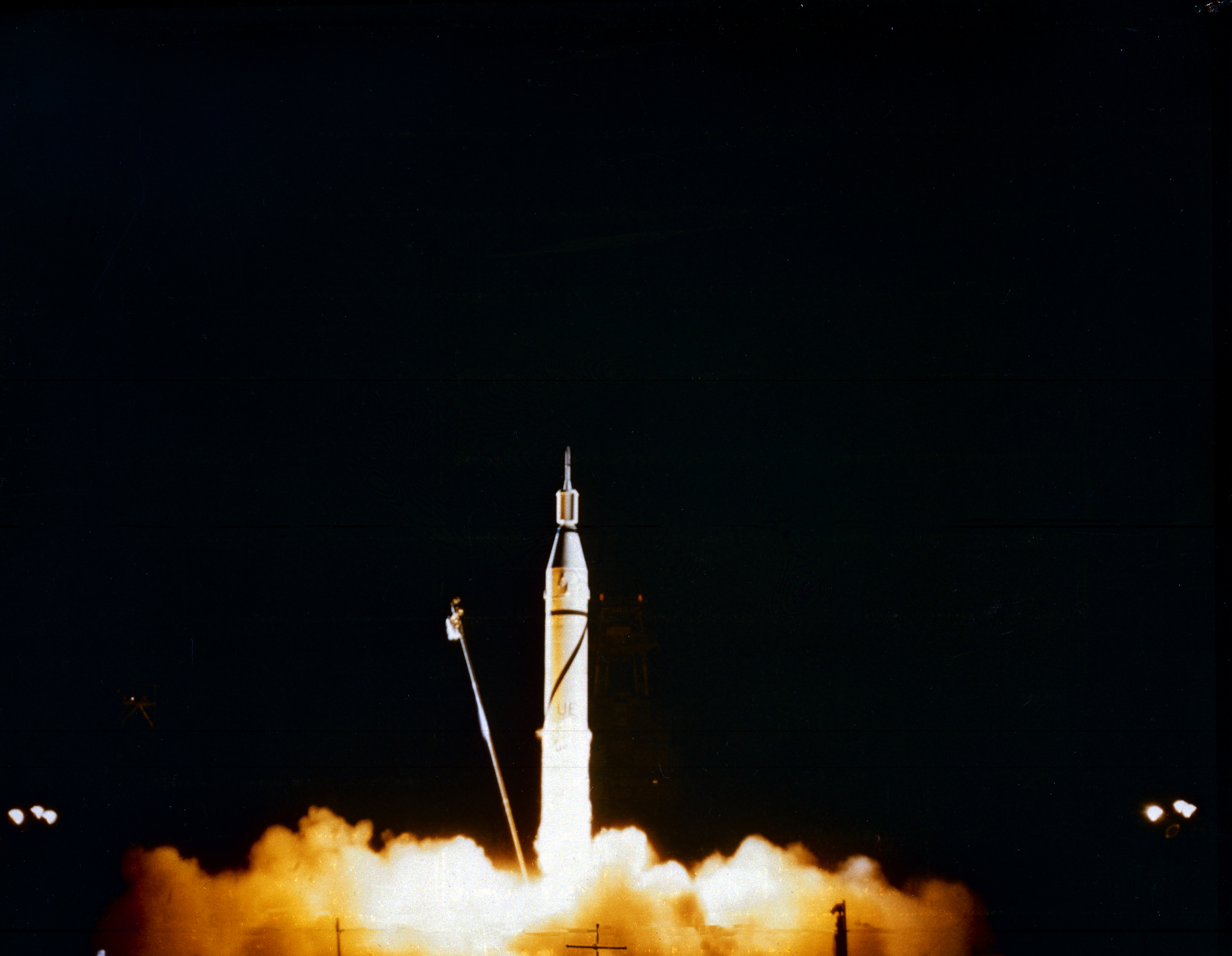
Launch of Explorer 1 on the Juno I launch vehicle.

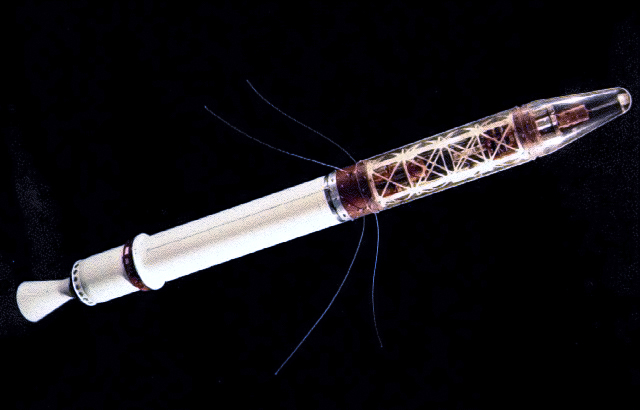
Explorer 1, the first Earth satellite orbited by the United States

The Explorers Program began as a U.S. Army proposal (Project Orbiter) to place a "civilian" artificial satellite into orbit during the International Geophysical Year (IGY). Although that proposal was rejected in favor of the U.S. Navy's Project Vanguard, which made the first sub-orbital flight Vanguard TV0 in December 1956, the Soviet Union's launch of Sputnik 1 on 4 October 1957 (and the resulting "Sputnik crisis") and the failure of the Vanguard 1 launch attempt resulted in the Army program being funded to match the Soviet space achievements. Explorer 1 was launched on the Juno I on 1 February 1958, becoming the first U.S. satellite, as well as discovering the Van Allen radiation belt.

Four follow-up satellites of the Explorer series were launched by the Juno I launch vehicle in 1958, of which Explorer 3 and Explorer 4 were successful, while Explorer 2 and Explorer 5 failed to reach orbit. The Juno I vehicle was replaced by the Juno II in 1959.

=== Continuation of the Explorers Program ===
With the establishment of NASA in 1958, the Explorers Program was transferred to NASA from the U.S. Army. NASA continued to use the name for an ongoing series of relatively small space missions, typically an artificial satellite with a specific science focus. Explorer 6 in 1959 was the first scientific satellite under the project direction of NASA's Goddard Space Flight Center (GSFC) in Greenbelt, Maryland.

The Interplanetary Monitoring Platform (IMP) was launched in 1963 and involved a network of eleven Explorer satellites designed to collect data on space radiation in support of the Apollo program. The IMP program was a major step forward in spacecraft electronics design, as it was the first space program to use integrated circuit (IC) chips and MOSFETs (MOS transistors). The IMP-A (Explorer 18) in 1963 was the first spacecraft to use IC chips, and the IMP-D (Explorer 33) in 1966 was the first to use MOSFETs.

List of Interplanetary Monitoring Platform (IMP) missions
Mission	Photo	Satellite		Launch date	Decay date	Notes
Mission	Photo	Explorer	IMP	Launch date	Decay date	Notes
IMP-1		Explorer 18	IMP-A	27 November 1963, 02:30 UTC	30 December 1965	First use of integrated circuits in a spacecraft. First satellite in IMP-A/-B/-C design series.
IMP-2		Explorer 21	IMP-B	4 October 1964, 03:45 UTC	1 January 1966	Second satellite in IMP-A/-B/-C design series.
IMP-3		Explorer 28	IMP-C	29 May 1965, 12:00 UTC	4 July 1968	Third satellite in IMP-A/-B/-C design series.
AIMP-1		Explorer 33	IMP-D	1 July 1966, 16:02 UTC	In orbit	First use of MOSFET integrated circuits in a spacecraft, similar design to IMP-E. Originally intended to orbit the Moon, but placed in an elliptical high orbit instead.
IMP-4		Explorer 34	IMP-F	24 May 1967, 14:05 UTC	3 May 1969	Similar design to IMP-G.
AIMP-2		Explorer 35	IMP-E	19 July 1967, 14:19 UTC	After 24 June 1973	Similar design to IMP-D. Positioned in Selenocentric orbit.
IMP-5		Explorer 41	IMP-G	21 June 1969, 08:47 UTC	23 December 1972	Similar design to IMP-F.
IMP-6		Explorer 43	IMP-I	13 March 1971, 16:15 UTC	2 October 1974	First spacecraft in IMP-I/-H/-J series.
IMP-7		Explorer 47	IMP-H	23 September 1972, 01:20 UTC	In orbit	Second spacecraft in IMP-I/-H/-J series.
IMP-8		Explorer 50	IMP-J	26 October 1973, 02:26 UTC	In orbit	Third spacecraft in IMP-I/-H/-J series, remained in service until 2006

Over the following two decades, NASA has launched over 50 Explorer missions, some in conjunction to military programs, usually of an exploratory or survey nature or had specific objectives not requiring the capabilities of a major space observatory. Explorer satellites have made many important discoveries on: Earth's magnetosphere and the shape of its gravity field; the solar wind; properties of micrometeoroids raining down on the Earth; ultraviolet, cosmic and X-rays from the Solar System and beyond; ionospheric physics; Solar plasma; solar energetic particles; and atmospheric physics. These missions have also investigated air density, radio astronomy, geodesy, and gamma-ray astronomy.

With decreases in NASA's budget, Explorer missions became infrequent in the early 1980s.

=== SMEX, MIDEX, and Student Explorers Programs ===
In 1988, the Small Explorer (SMEX) class was established with a focus on frequent flight opportunities for highly focused and relatively inexpensive space science missions in the disciplines of astrophysics and space physics. The first three SMEX missions were chosen in April 1989 out of 51 candidates, and launched in 1992, 1996 and 1998 The second set of two missions were announced in September 1994 and launched in 1998 and 1999.

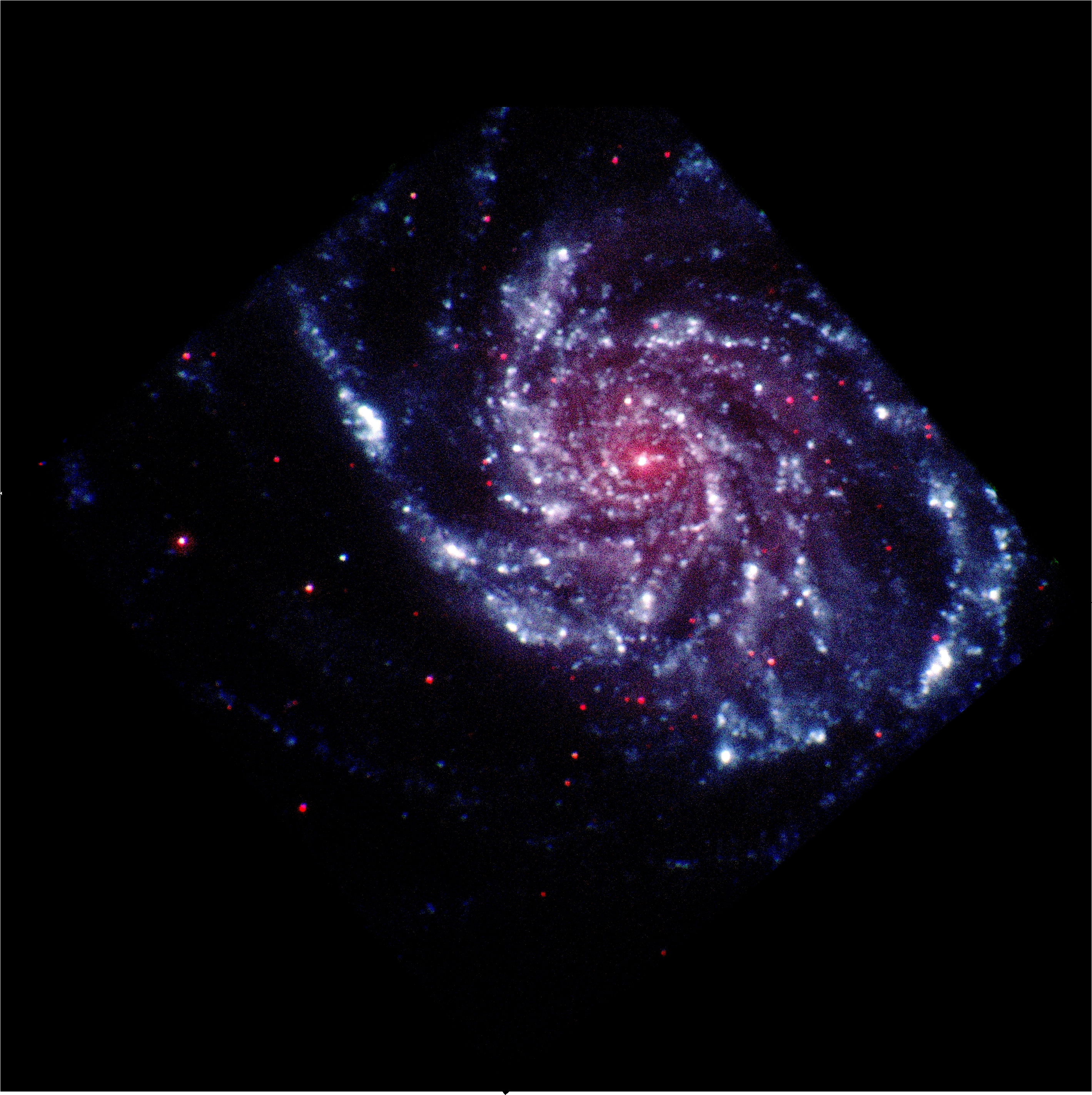
This artificially colored view of M101 maps ultraviolet light as blue while visible light is red since UV light does not have a "color" (the eye stopping at about violet). This view was taken by the MIDEX-3 Swift, which can also detect X-rays, and has contributed to the study of gamma-ray bursts and other topics.

In the mid-1990s, NASA initiated the Medium-class Explorers (MIDEX) to enable more frequent flights. These are larger than SMEX missions and were to be launched aboard a new kind of medium-light class launch vehicle. This new launch vehicle was not developed and instead, these missions were flown on a modified Delta II rocket. The first announcement opportunity for MIDEX was issued in March 1995, and the first launch under this new class was FUSE in 1999.

In May 1994, NASA started the Student Explorer Demonstration Initiative (STEDI) pilot program, to demonstrate that high-quality space science can be carried out with small, low-cost missions. Of the three selected missions, SNOE was launched in 1998 and TERRIERS in 1999, but the latter failed after launch. The STEDI program was terminated in 2001. Later, NASA established the University-Class Explorer (UNEX) program for much cheaper missions, which is regarded as a successor to STEDI.

The Explorer missions were at first managed by the Small Explorers Project Office at NASA's Goddard Space Flight Center (GSFC). In early 1999, that office was closed and with the announcement of opportunity for the third set of SMEX missions NASA converted the SMEX class so that each mission was managed by its principal investigator, with oversight by the GSFC Explorer Project. The Explorers Program Office at Goddard Space Flight Center, provides management of the many operational scientific exploration missions that are characterized by relatively moderate costs and small to medium-sized missions that are capable of being built, tested, and launched in a short time interval compared to larger observatories like NASA's Great Observatories.

Excluding the launches, the MIDEX class has a current mission cap cost of US$250 million in 2018, with future MIDEX missions being capped at US$350 million. The cost cap for SMEX missions in 2017 was US$165 million. UNEX missions are capped at US$15 million. A sub-project called Missions of Opportunity (MO) has funded science instruments or hardware components of onboard non-NASA space missions, and have a total NASA cost cap of US$70 million.

Following the 2020 Astronomy and Astrophysics Decadal Survey, NASA created the Probe Explorers program as a new class with the intention of filling the gap between flagship missions and the other classes of the Explorers Program. This class has a mission cap cost of US$1 billion. The first mission selected in this class was the far-infrared telescope PRIMA, targeted for a 2033 launch.

== Classes ==
=== Probe Explorers ===
List of Probe Explorers missions
Name	PE number	Explorer number	Launch (UTC)	Status
PRIMA			2033	In development

=== Medium-Class Explorers (MIDEX) ===
List of MIDEX missions
Name	MIDEX number	Explorer number	Launch (UTC)	Status
RXTE^{a}		Explorer-69	30 December 1995	Ended in 2012 / Reentered on 30 April 2018
ACE^{b}		Explorer-71	25 August 1997	Operational
FUSE	MIDEX-0	Explorer-77	23 June 1999	Ended in 2007
IMAGE	MIDEX-1	Explorer-78	25 March 2000	Lost contact in 2005. Partial contact reestablished in January 2018
WMAP	MIDEX-2	Explorer-80	30 June 2001	Ended in 2010
Swift	MIDEX-3	Explorer-84	20 November 2004	Reentered on 4 November 2026 after the failure of LINK
FAME	MIDEX-4	—	Scheduled for 2004	Cancelled in 2002 (cost)
THEMIS A	MIDEX-5A	Explorer-85	17 February 2007	Operational
THEMIS B	MIDEX-5B	Explorer-86	17 February 2007	Operational
THEMIS C	MIDEX-5C	Explorer-87	17 February 2007	Operational
THEMIS D	MIDEX-5D	Explorer-88	17 February 2007	Operational
THEMIS E	MIDEX-5E	Explorer-89	17 February 2007	Operational
WISE / NEOWISE	MIDEX-6	Explorer-92	14 December 2009	Mission operations completed on 31 July 2024. Reentered on 2 November 2024.
TESS	MIDEX-7	Explorer-95	18 April 2018	Operational
ICON	MIDEX-8	Explorer-96	11 October 2019	Contact lost in November 2022
SPHEREx	MIDEX-9	Explorer-102	12 March 2025	Operational
MUSE	MIDEX-10		2027	In development
HelioSwarm	MIDEX-11		2029	In development
UVEX	MIDEX-12		2030	In development

=== Small Explorers (SMEX) ===
The Small Explorers class was implemented in 1989 specifically to fund space exploration missions that cost no more than US$120 million. The missions are managed by the Explorers Project at the Goddard Space Flight Center (GSFC).

The first set of three SMEX missions were launched between 1992 and 1998. The second set of two missions were launched in 1998 and 1999. These early missions were managed by the Small Explorers Project Office at Goddard Space Flight Center. In early 1999, that office was closed and with the announcement of opportunity for the third set of SMEX missions NASA converted the program so that each mission was managed by its Principal Investigator, with oversight by the GSFC Explorers Project.

NASA funded a competitive study of five candidate heliophysics Small Explorers missions for flight in 2022. The proposals were Mechanisms of Energetic Mass Ejection – eXplorer (MEME-X), Focusing Optics X-ray Solar Imager (FOXSI), Multi-Slit Solar Explorer (MUSE), Tandem Reconnection and Cusp Electrodynamics Reconnaissance Satellites (TRACERS), and Polarimeter to Unify the Corona and Heliosphere (PUNCH). In June 2019 NASA selected TRACERS and PUNCH for flight.

List of SMEX missions
Name	SMEX number	Explorer number	Launch (UTC)	End of mission	Status
SAMPEX	SMEX-1	Explorer-68	3 July 1992	30 June 2004	Reentered on 13 November 2012
FAST	SMEX-2	Explorer-70	21 August 1996	4 May 2009	
SWAS	SMEX-3	Explorer-74	6 December 1998	21 July 2004	
TRACE	SMEX-4	Explorer-73	2 April 1998	21 June 2010	Reentered on 18 July 2025
WIRE	SMEX-5	Explorer-75	5 March 1999	—N/a	Spacecraft equipment failure; reentered on 10 May 2011
RHESSI	SMEX-6	Explorer-81	5 February 2002	April 2018	Deorbited on 20 April 2023
GALEX	SMEX-7	Explorer-83	28 April 2003	May 2012	Decommissioned on 28 June 2013
SPIDR	SMEX-8	—	Scheduled for 2005	—N/a	Cancelled in 2003 due to poor instrument sensitivity
Aeronomy of Ice in the Mesosphere (AIM)	SMEX-9	Explorer-90	25 April 2007	19 August 2024	Reentered on 19 August 2024
IBEX	SMEX-10	Explorer-91	19 October 2008		Operational
NuSTAR	SMEX-11	Explorer-93	13 June 2012		Operational
IRIS	SMEX-12	Explorer-94	28 June 2013		Operational
GEMS	SMEX-13	—	Scheduled for 2014	—N/a	Cancelled in 2012 due to expected cost overruns
Imaging X-ray Polarimetry Explorer (IXPE)	SMEX-14	Explorer-97	9 December 2021		Operational
PUNCH-NFI	SMEX-15A	Explorer-98	12 March 2025		Operational
PUNCH-WFI 1	SMEX-15B	Explorer-99	12 March 2025		Operational
PUNCH-WFI 3	SMEX-15D	Explorer-100	12 March 2025		Operational
PUNCH-WFI 2	SMEX-15C	Explorer-101	12 March 2025		Operational
TRACERS A	SMEX-16A	Explorer-106	23 July 2025		Operational
TRACERS B	SMEX-16B	Explorer-107	23 July 2025		Operational
COSI	SMEX-17		August 2027		In development

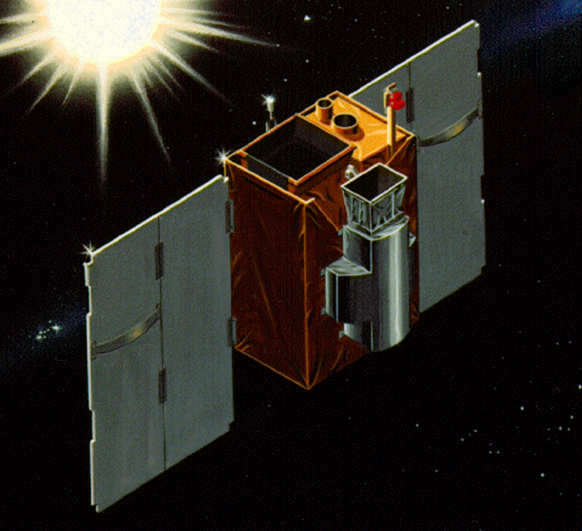
SAMPEX

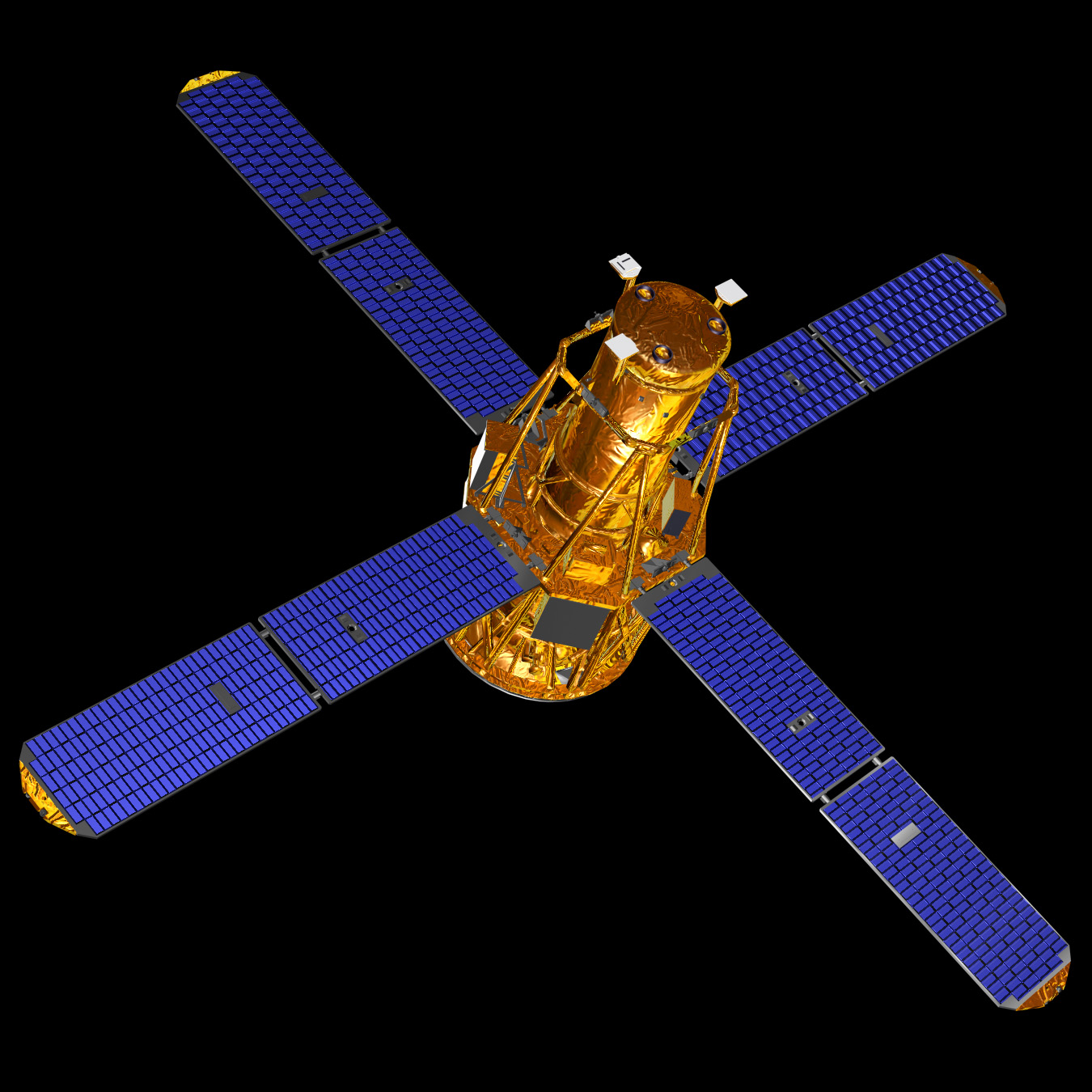
RHESSI

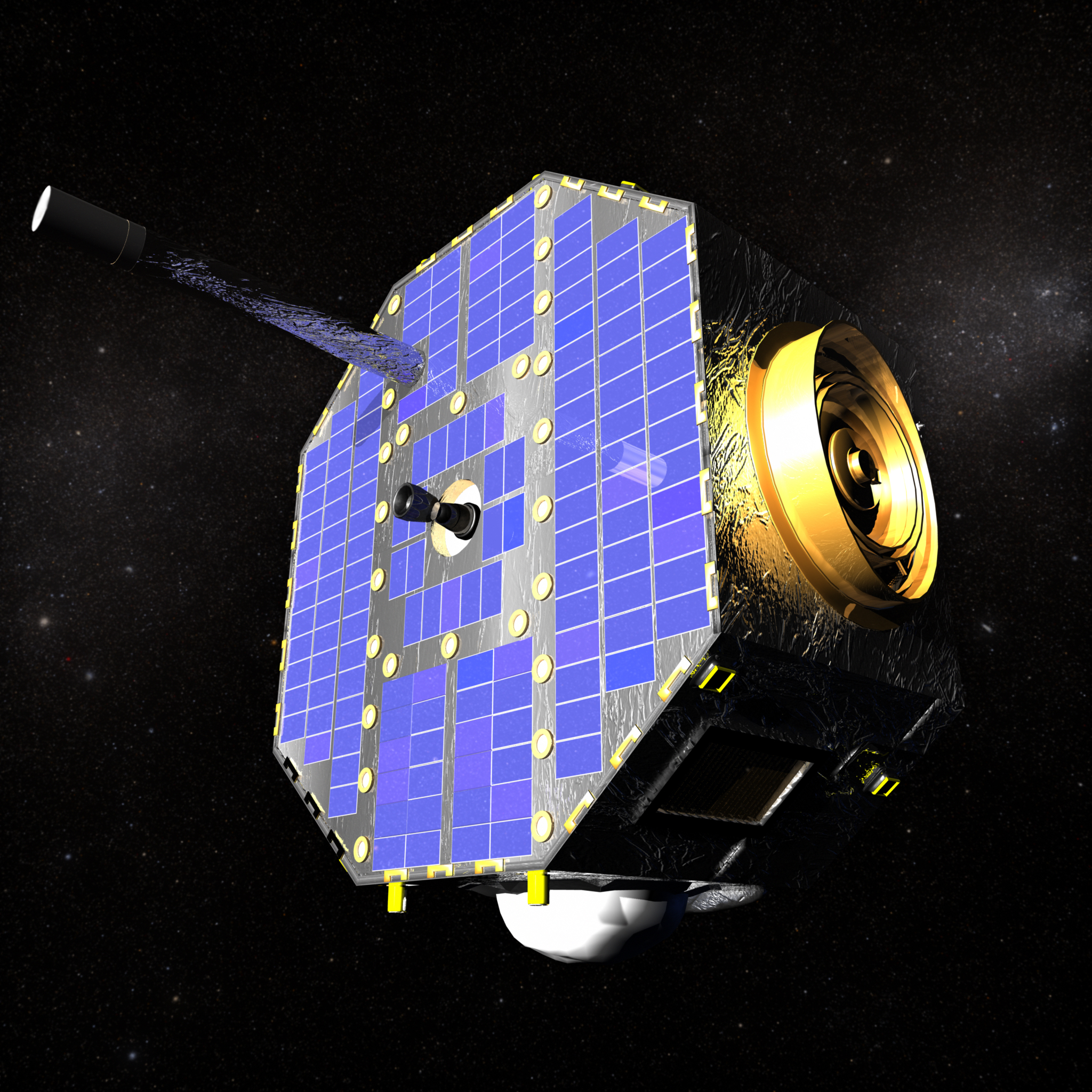
IBEX

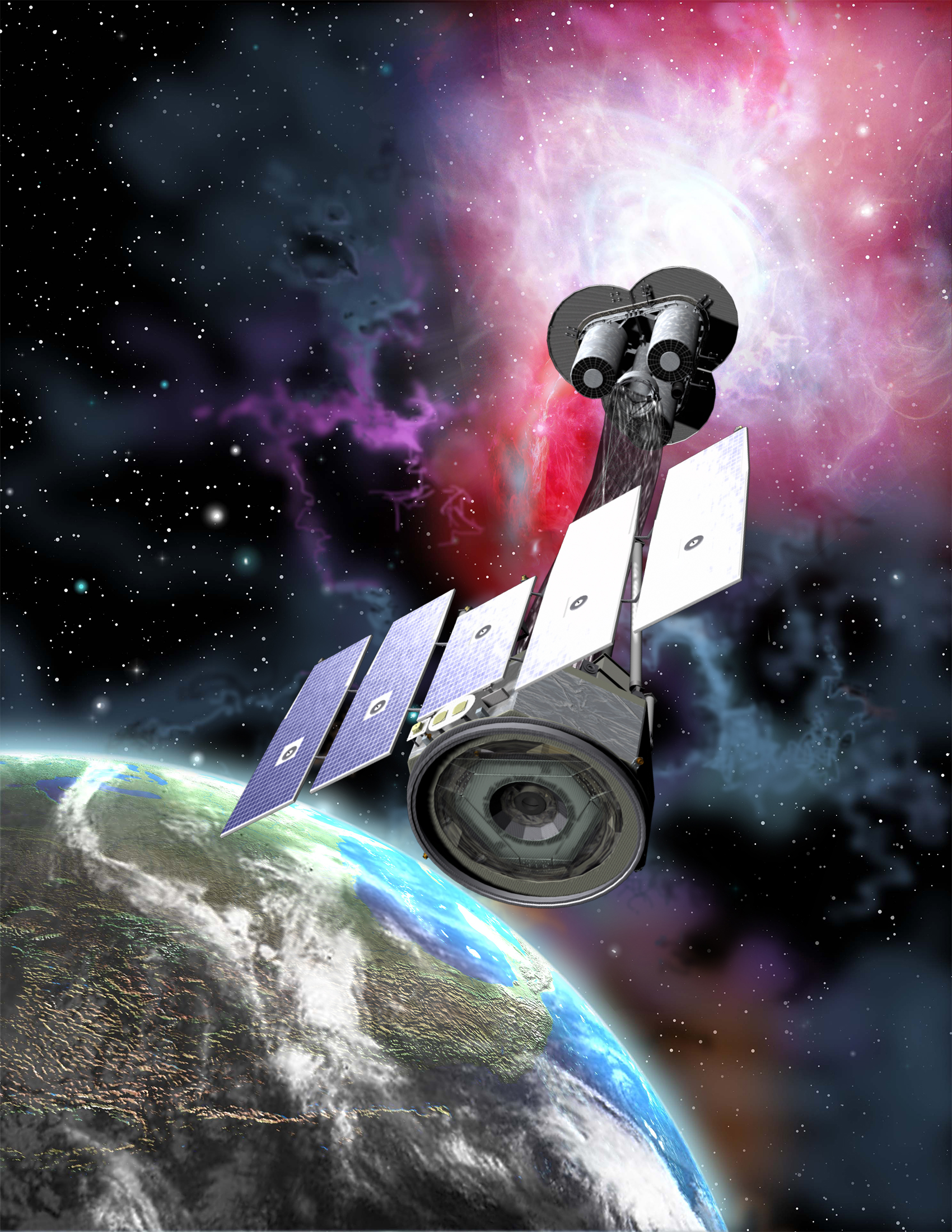
IXPE

=== University-Class Explorers (UNEX) ===
List of UNEX missions
Name	UNEX number	Explorer number	Launch (UTC)	Status
SNOE	UNEX-1	Explorer-72	26 February 1998	Ended in 2000; decayed from orbit in December 2003
IMEX	UNEX-2	—	Scheduled for 2003	Cancelled before 2005 (cost)
CHIPS	UNEX-3	Explorer-82	12 January 2003	Ended in 2008

=== Missions of Opportunity (MO) ===
Missions of Opportunity (MO) are investigations characterized by being part of a non-NASA space mission of any size and having a total NASA cost of under $55 million. These missions are conducted on a no-exchange-of-funds basis with the organization sponsoring the mission. NASA solicits proposals for Missions of Opportunity on SMEX, MIDEX and UNEX investigations.

List of MO
Name	Launcher (mission)	Launch (UTC)	Status
HETE-2	NASA (Explorer-79)	9 October 2000	Ended in March 2008
INTEGRAL	ESA	17 October 2002	Ended on 28 February 2025
Suzaku (Astro-E2)	JAXA	10 July 2005	Ended on 2 September 2015
TWINS	NRO (USA-184; USA-200)	TWINS-1: 28 June 2006; TWINS-2: 13 March 2008	Operational
CINDI	DoD (C/NOFS)	16 April 2008	Ended in November 2015
Hitomi (Astro-H)	JAXA	17 February 2016	Failed
NICER	ISS (CRS-11)	3 June 2017	Operational
GOLD	SES (SES-14)	25 January 2018	Operational
XRISM	JAXA	6 September 2023	Operational
AWE	ISS (CRS-29)	December 2023	Ended on 21 May 2026
GUSTO	NASA (high-altitude balloon)	31 December 2023	Ended on 26 February 2024
EZIE	NASA, JHUAPL	15 March 2025	Operational
SunRISE	NASA (Maxar satellite)	2026	In development
Solar-C EUVST	JAXA	July 2028	In development
CASE	ESA (Cosmic Vision M4)	2029	In development

=== Beacon Explorers ===
Three satellites were planned in this series: Beacon Explorer-A, Beacon Explorer-B, Beacon Explorer-C.

=== GEOS series ===
A series of three Geodetic Earth Orbiting Satellite (GEOS) were put in orbit: GEOS 1, GEOS 2, GEOS 3.

== Launched spacecraft ==
Explorers Program name numbers can be found in the NSSDC master catalog, typically assigned to each spacecraft in a mission. These numbers were not officially assigned until after 1975.

Explorers Program satellites
No.	Name(s)	Launch date (UTC)	Rocket	Mass (kg)	Orbit regime	End of data	Re-entry	Mission/Notes
1	Explorer 1	1 February 1958	Juno I	14	MEO	23 May 1958	31 March 1970	First American satellite, third satellite to achieve orbit; discovered the Van Allen radiation belt; launched by the U.S. Army
2	Explorer 2	5 March 1958	Juno I	15	Failed	—	—	Failed to achieve orbit.
3	Explorer 3	26 March 1958	Juno I	14	MEO	27 June 1958	27 June 1958	Energetic particle studies helped confirm the presence of Van Allen radiation belt
4	Explorer 4	26 July 1958	Juno I	26	MEO	5 October 1958	23 October 1959	Monitor charged particles inside Van Allen belts from nuclear detonations (during Operation Argus)
5	Explorer 5	24 August 1958	Juno I	17	failed	—	—	Planned in conjunction with Explorer 4, but launch failed
—	Explorer S-1 (7X)	16 July 1959	Juno II	42	failed	—	—	Planned to measure Earth's radiation balance, but destroyed within seconds by range safety
6	Explorer 6 (S-2, Able 3)	7 August 1959	Thor-Able	64	HEO	6 October 1959	12 July 1961	Magnetosphere research and digital telemetry; first NASA launch, first Earth photo from orbit
7	Explorer 7 (S-1A)	13 October 1959	Juno II	42	LEO	24 August 1961	In orbit	Micrometeoroids and energetic particle studies, first satellite to measure Earth's climate
–	S-46A (IE-B)	23 March 1960	Juno II	16	failed	—	—	Analyze electron and proton radiation energies, failed to achieve orbit
8	Explorer 8 (S-30)	3 November 1960	Juno II	41	LEO	27 December 1960	27 March 2012	Measured atmospheric composition of the ionosphere
–	S-56	4 December 1960	Scout X-1	6	failed	—	—	Atmosphere density measurement, but failed to achieve orbit
9	Explorer 9 (S-56A)	16 February 1961	Scout X-1	36	LEO	9 April 1964	9 April 1964	Atmospheric density measurements, first spacecraft placed in orbit by a solid-fuel rocket
–	S-45	24 February 1961	Juno II	34	failed	—	—	Ionosphere research, but failed to achieve orbit
10	Explorer 10 (P 14)	25 March 1961	Thor-Delta	79	HEO	25 March 1961	1 June 1968	Investigated the magnetic field between the Earth and Moon
11	Explorer 11 (S 15)	27 April 1961	Juno II	37	LEO	17 November 1961	In orbit	Gamma ray astronomy
–	S-45A	25 May 1961	Juno II	34	failed	—	—	Ionosphere research, failed to achieve orbit. Last Juno II launch.
–	S-55 (satellite) (Meteoroid Satellite-A, Micrometeorite Explorer)	30 June 1961	Scout X-1	85	failed	—	—	Micrometeoroid research, failed to achieve orbit
12	EPE-A (S 3, Energetic Particle Explorer-A)	16 August 1961	Thor-Delta	38	HEO	6 December 1961	1 September 1963	Energetic particle research
13	Explorer 13 (S-55A)	25 August 1961	Scout X-1	86	LEO	28 August 1961	28 August 1961	Micrometeoroid research; partial failure
14	EPE-B (Energetic Particle Explorer-B)	2 October 1962	Delta A	40	HEO	11 August 1963	1 July 1966	Energetic particle research
15	EPE-C (S-3B, Energetic Particle Explorer-C)	27 October 1962	Delta A	44	HEO	30 January 1963	15 January 1978	Energetic particle research
16	S-55B	16 December 1962	Scout X-3	101	LEO	22 July 1963	In orbit	Micrometeoroid research
17	AE-A (S-6, Atmosphere Explorer-A)	3 April 1963	Delta B	184	LEO	10 July 1963	24 November 1966	Atmospheric research
18	IMP-A (IMP 1, Interplanetary Monitoring Platform-A)	27 November 1963	Delta C	138	HEO	10 May 1965	30 December 1965	Magnetospheric research
19	AD-A (Atmospheric Density-A)	19 December 1963	Scout X-4	8	LEO	10 May 1981	10 May 1981	Atmospheric density measurements
–	BE-A (Beacon Explorer-A, S-66A)	19 March 1964	Delta B	114	failed	—	—	Launch failure
20	IE-A (S 48, TOPSI, Ionosphere Explorer-A)	25 August 1964	Scout X-4	45	LEO	29 December 1965	In orbit	Ionosphere research
21	IMP-B (IMP 2, Interplanetary Monitoring Platform-B)	4 October 1964	Delta C	135	HEO	13 October 1965	30 January 1966	Magnetospheric research
22	BE-B (Beacon Explorer-B, S-66B)	10 October 1964	Scout X-4	53	LEO	February 1970	In orbit	Ionospheric and geodetic research
23	S 55C	6 November 1964	Scout X-4	134	LEO	7 November 1965	29 June 1983	Micrometeoric research
24	AD-B (Atmospheric Density-B)	21 November 1964	Scout X-4	9	MEO	18 October 1968	18 October 1968	Atmospheric density measurements
25	Injun 4 (IE-B, Ionosphere Explorer-B)	21 November 1964	Scout X-4	40	LEO	December 1966	In orbit	Ionospheric research
26	EPE-D (Energetic Particle Explorer-D)	21 December 1964	Delta C	46	MEO	27 December 1967	23 August 2021	High energy particle observations
27	BE-C (Beacon Explorer-C, S-66C)	29 April 1965	Scout X-4	61	LEO	20 July 1973	In orbit	Magnetospheric research
28	IMP-C (IMP 3, Interplanetary Monitoring Platform-C)	29 May 1965	Delta C	128	HEO	12 May 1967	4 July 1968	Magnetospheric research
29	GEOS 1 (GEOS-A, Geodetic Earth Orbiting Satellite-1)	6 November 1965	Delta E	387	LEO	23 June 1978	In orbit	Geodetic Earth monitoring
30	SOLRAD 8 (SE-A)	19 November 1965	Scout X-4	57	LEO	5 November 1967	In orbit	Solar radiation monitoring (Cover for covert ELINT mission)
31	DME-A (Direct Measurements Explorer)	29 November 1965	Thor-Agena B	99	LEO	1 October 1969	In orbit	Ionospheric research
32	AE-B (Atmosphere Explorer-B)	25 May 1966	Delta C1	225	LEO	March 1967	22 February 1985	Atmospheric research
33	IMP-D (AIMP 1, Interplanetary Monitoring Platform-D)	1 July 1966	Delta E1	212	HEO	21 September 1971	In orbit	Magnetospheric research
34	IMP-F (IMP 4, Interplanetary Monitoring Platform-F)	24 May 1967	Delta E1	163	MEO	3 May 1969	3 May 1969	Magnetospheric research
35	IMP-E (AIMP 2, Interplanetary Monitoring Platform-E)	19 July 1967	Delta E1	230	Lunar	24 June 1973	Lunar orbit	Magnetospheric research
36	GEOS 2 (GEOS-B, Geodetic Earth Orbiting Satellite-2)	11 January 1968	Delta E1	469	LEO	1 July 1982	In orbit	Geodetic Earth monitoring
37	SOLRAD 9 (SE B)	5 March 1968	Scout B	198	LEO	30 April 1974	16 November 1990	Solar radiation monitoring (Cover for covert ELINT mission)
38	RAE-A (RAE 1, Radio Astronomy Explorer-A)	4 July 1968	Delta J	602	MEO	(~1969)	In orbit	Radio astronomy
39	AD-C (Atmospheric Density-C)	8 August 1968	Scout B	9	LEO	23 June 1971	22 June 1981	Atmospheric density measurements
40	Injun 5 (Injun C, IE-C, Ionosphere Explorer-C)	8 August 1968	Scout B	71	LEO	June 1971	In orbit	Magnetospheric Research
41	IMP-G (IMP 5, Interplanetary Monitoring Platform-G)	21 June 1969	Delta E1	145	HEO	23 December 1972	23 December 1972	Magnetospheric research
42	Uhuru (SAS-A, SAS 1)	12 December 1970	Scout B	142	LEO	4 January 1975	5 April 1979	X-ray astronomy
43	IMP-H (IMP 7, Interplanetary Monitoring Platform-H)	13 March 1971	Delta M6	635	MEO	2 October 1974	2 October 1974	Magnetospheric research
44	SOLRAD 10 (SE-C, SOLRAD-C)	8 July 1971	Scout B	260	LEO	30 June 1973	15 December 1979	Solar radiation monitoring (Cover for covert ELINT mission)
45	SSS-A (S-Cubed A)	15 November 1971	Scout B	52	MEO	30 September 1974	10 January 1992	Magnetospheric research
46	MTS (Meteoroid Technology Satellite, METEC)	13 August 1972	Scout D-1	90	LEO	4 November 1974	2 November 1979	Micrometeoroids research
47	IMP-I (IMP 6, Interplanetary Monitoring Platform-I)	23 September 1972	Delta 1604	635	HEO	31 October 1978	In orbit	Magnetospheric research
48	SAS-B (Small Astronomy Satellite-B, SAS 2)	15 November 1972	Scout D-1	166	LEO	8 June 1973	20 August 1980	X-ray astronomy
49	RAE-B (RAE 2, Radio Astronomy Explorer-B)	10 June 1973	Delta 1913	328	Lunar	26 April 1977	Presumed crashed into Moon sometime after August 1977	Radio astronomy
50	IMP-J (IMP 8, Interplanetary Monitoring Platform-J)	26 October 1973	Delta 1604	371	HEO	7 October 2006	In orbit	Magnetospheric research
51	AE-C (Atmosphere Explorer-C)	16 December 1973	Delta 1900	658	LEO	(12 December 1978)	12 December 1978	Atmospheric research
52	Hawkeye 1 (Injun-F, Injun 6, IE-D, Ionosphere Explorer-D)	3 June 1974	Scout E-1	23	HEO	28 April 1978	28 April 1978	Magnetospheric research
53	SAS-C (Small Astronomy Satellite-C, SAS 3)	7 May 1975	Scout F-1	197	LEO	7 April 1979	9 April 1979	X-ray astronomy
54	AE-D (Atmosphere Explorer-D)	6 October 1975	Delta 2910	681	LEO	29 January 1976	12 March 1976	Atmospheric research
55	AE-E (Atmosphere Explorer-E)	20 November 1975	Delta 2910	735	LEO	25 September 1980	10 June 1981	Atmospheric research
—	DADE-A (Dual Air Density Explorer-A)	5 December 1975	Scout F-1	40	failed	—	—	Atmospheric research; failed during launch
—	DADE-B (Dual Air Density Explorer-B)	5 December 1975	Scout F-1	43	failed	—	—	Atmospheric research; failed during launch
56	ISEE-1 (ISEE-A)	22 October 1977	Delta 2914	340	HEO	26 September 1987	26 September 1987	Magnetospheric research; launched with ESA's ISEE-2; co-mission with ISEE 3
57	IUE	26 January 1978	Delta 2914	669	MEO	30 September 1996	In orbit	Ultraviolet astronomy
58	HCMM (AEM-A)	26 April 1978	Scout F	117	LEO	30 September 1980	December 22, 1981	Thermal mapping of the Earth
59	ICE (ISEE 3, ISEE-C)	12 August 1978	Delta 2914	390	Sun–Earth L_{1}	16 September 2014	Heliocentric orbit	Magnetospheric research; heliocentric mission, re-purposed in 1982 as a cometary probe (renamed International Cometary Explorer). First spacecraft to be placed at a libration point, and first one to perform a flyby of a comet.
60	SAGE (AEM-B)	18 February 1979	Scout D-1	149	LEO	7 January 1982	11 April 1989	Stratospheric aerosol and ozone data
61	MAGSAT (AEM-C)	30 October 1979	Scout G-1	158	LEO	6 May 1980	11 June 1980	Mapped the near surface magnetic field of the Earth
62	Dynamics Explorer 1 (DE-1)	3 August 1981	Delta 3913	424	MEO	28 February 1991	In orbit	Magnetospheric research
63	Dynamics Explorer 2 (DE-2)	3 August 1981	Delta 3913	420	LEO	19 February 1983	19 February 1983	Magnetospheric research
64	SME	6 October 1981	Delta 2310	145	LEO	4 April 1989	5 March 1991	Atmospheric research
65	AMPTE-CCE	16 August 1984	Delta 3924	242	MEO	12 July 1989	In orbit	Magnetosphere research
66	COBE	18 November 1989	Delta 5920	2,206	LEO	23 December 1993	In orbit	Microwave astronomy
67	EUVE (BERKSAT)	7 June 1992	Delta II 6920-X	3,275	LEO	31 January 2001	30 January 2002	Ultraviolet astronomy
68	SAMPEX	3 July 1992	Scout G-1	158	LEO	30 June 2004	13 November 2012.	SMEX: magnetospheric research
69	RXTE	30 December 1995	Delta II 7920	3,200	LEO	3 January 2012	30 April 2018	MIDEX: X-ray astronomy
70	FAST	21 August 1996	Pegasus XL	187	LEO	4 May 2009	In orbit	SMEX: auroral phenomena
—	HETE 1	4 November 1996	Pegasus XL	128	LEO	—	7 April 2002	Separation failure, mission relaunched as HETE 2
71	ACE	25 August 1997	Delta II 7920	596	Sun–Earth L_{1}	Operational	In L_{1} orbit	MIDEX: solar/interplanetary/interstellar particle research
72	SNOE	26 February 1998	Pegasus XL	120	LEO	13 December 2003	13 December 2003	STEDI, UNEX: atmospheric research
73	TRACE	2 April 1998	Pegasus XL	250	LEO	21 June 2010	In orbit	SMEX: solar observatory
74	SWAS	6 December 1998	Pegasus XL	288	LEO	1 September 2005	In orbit	SMEX: submillimeter astronomy
75	WIRE	5 March 1999	Pegasus XL	250	SSO	30 September 2000	10 May 2011	SMEX, Infrared astronomy, primary mission failed due to loss of coolant
76	TERRIERS	18 May 1999	Pegasus XL	120	Polar LEO	18 May 1999	In orbit	STEDI: atmospheric research, satellite failed shortly after achieving orbit
77	FUSE	23 June 1999	Delta II 7320	1,400	LEO	18 October 2007	In orbit	MIDEX: ultraviolet astronomy
78	IMAGE	25 March 2000	Delta II 7326	536	Polar MEO	18 December 2005	In orbit	MIDEX: magnetospheric research
79	HETE-2	9 October 2000	Pegasus-H	124	LEO	28 March 2007	In orbit	MO: UV, X-ray, and gamma ray astronomy
80	WMAP	30 June 2001	Delta II 7425-10	840	Sun–Earth L_{2}	October 2010	Heliocentric orbit	MIDEX: microwave astronomy
81	RHESSI	5 February 2002	Pegasus XL	230	LEO	16 August 2018	20 April 2023	SMEX: X-ray and gamma ray solar flare imaging
—	INTEGRAL	17 October 2002	Proton-K Blok DM-2	4,000	HEO	28 February 2025	In orbit	International: space telescope for observing gamma rays
82	CHIPSat	13 January 2003	Delta II 7320-10	60	LEO	11 April 2008	In orbit	UNEX: ultraviolet spectroscopy and astronomy
83	GALEX	28 April 2003	Pegasus XL	280	LEO	28 June 2013	In orbit	SMEX: ultraviolet astronomy
84	Swift	20 November 2004	Delta II 7320-10C	1,470	LEO	23 October 2026	4 November 2026	MIDEX: gamma ray astronomy
—	Suzaku (Astro E2)	10 July 2005	M-V	1,706	LEO	2 September 2015	5 January 2025	MO: instrument on JAXA's Suzaku mission
—	TWINS A	28 June 2006	Delta IV M+(4,2)	classified	Molniya	Operational	In orbit	MO: payload on Trumpet-F/O-1 1 (USA-184)
85	THEMIS A	17 February 2007	Delta II 7925	77	HEO	Operational	In orbit	MIDEX: magnetospheric research
86	THEMIS B (ARTEMIS P1)	17 February 2007	Delta II 7925	77	Lunar	Operational	Lunar orbit	MIDEX; Magnetospheric research
87	THEMIS C (ARTEMIS P2)	17 February 2007	Delta II 7925	77	Lunar	Operational	Lunar orbit	MIDEX: magnetospheric research
88	THEMIS D	17 February 2007	Delta II 7925	77	HEO	Operational	In orbit	MIDEX: magnetospheric research
89	THEMIS E	17 February 2007	Delta II 7925	77	HEO	Operational	In orbit	MIDEX: magnetospheric research
90	AIM	25 April 2007	Pegasus XL	197	SSO	March 2023	19 August 2024	SMEX: noctilucent cloud observation
—	TWINS B	13 March 2008	Atlas V 411	classified	Molniya	Operational	In orbit	MO: payload on Trumpet-F/O-1 2 (USA-200)
—	CINDI	16 April 2008	Pegasus XL	395	LEO	28 November 2015	28 November 2015	MO: instruments on C/NOFS
91	IBEX	19 October 2008	Pegasus XL	107	MEO	Operational	In orbit	SMEX: mapping the boundary between the Solar System and interstellar space.
92	WISE	14 December 2009	Delta II 7320	661	LEO	August 2024	2 November 2024	MIDEX: infrared astronomy, NEOWISE extension. Discovered first Earth trojan.
93	NuSTAR	13 June 2012	Pegasus XL	350	LEO	Operational	In orbit	SMEX: high-energy X-ray astronomy
94	IRIS	27 June 2013	Pegasus XL	183	SSO	Operational	In orbit	SMEX: solar UV astronomy
—	Hitomi (NeXT, ASTRO-H)	7 February 2016	H-2A-202	2,700	LEO	26 March 2016	In orbit	MO: X-ray instrument on JAXA's Hitomi, but spacecraft failed after initial checkouts
—	NICER	3 May 2017	Falcon 9 FT	372	ISS	Operational	ISS	MO: instrument on ISS for neutron star observations
—	GOLD	25 January 2018	Ariane 5 ECA	37	GEO	Operational	In orbit	MO: instrument on SES-14 comsat for studying Earth–space boundary
95	TESS	18 April 2018	Falcon 9 FT	362	HEO	Operational	In orbit	MIDEX: survey for transiting exoplanets
96	ICON	11 October 2019	Pegasus XL	287	LEO	Operational	In orbit	MIDEX: ionospheric studies
97	IXPE	9 December 2021	Falcon 9 Block 5	330	LEO	Operational	In orbit	SMEX: X-ray studies
—	XRISM	6 September 2023	H-IIA 202	2,300	LEO	Operational	In orbit	MO: instruments on JAXA's XRISM x-ray space telescope
98	PUNCH-NFI	12 March 2025	Falcon 9 Block 5	40	LEO	Operational	In orbit	SMEX: Heliosphere studies
99	PUNCH-WFI 1	12 March 2025	Falcon 9 Block 5	40	LEO	Operational	In orbit	SMEX: Heliosphere studies
100	PUNCH-WFI 3	12 March 2025	Falcon 9 Block 5	40	LEO	Operational	In orbit	SMEX: Heliosphere studies
101	PUNCH-WFI 2	12 March 2025	Falcon 9 Block 5	40	LEO	Operational	In orbit	SMEX: Heliosphere studies
102	SPHEREx	12 March 2025	Falcon 9 Block 5	178	LEO	Operational	In orbit	MIDEX: Infrared studies
103	EZIE A	15 March 2025	Falcon 9 Block 5	10	LEO	Operational	In orbit	MO: Space weather studies
104	EZIE C	15 March 2025	Falcon 9 Block 5	10	LEO	Operational	In orbit	MO: Space weather studies
105	EZIE B	15 March 2025	Falcon 9 Block 5	10	LEO	Operational	In orbit	MO: Space weather studies
106	TRACERS A	23 July 2025	Falcon 9 Block 5	200	LEO	Operational	In orbit	MO: Solar wind studies
107	TRACERS B	23 July 2025	Falcon 9 Block 5	200	LEO	Operational	In orbit	MO: Solar wind studies

== Cancelled missions ==
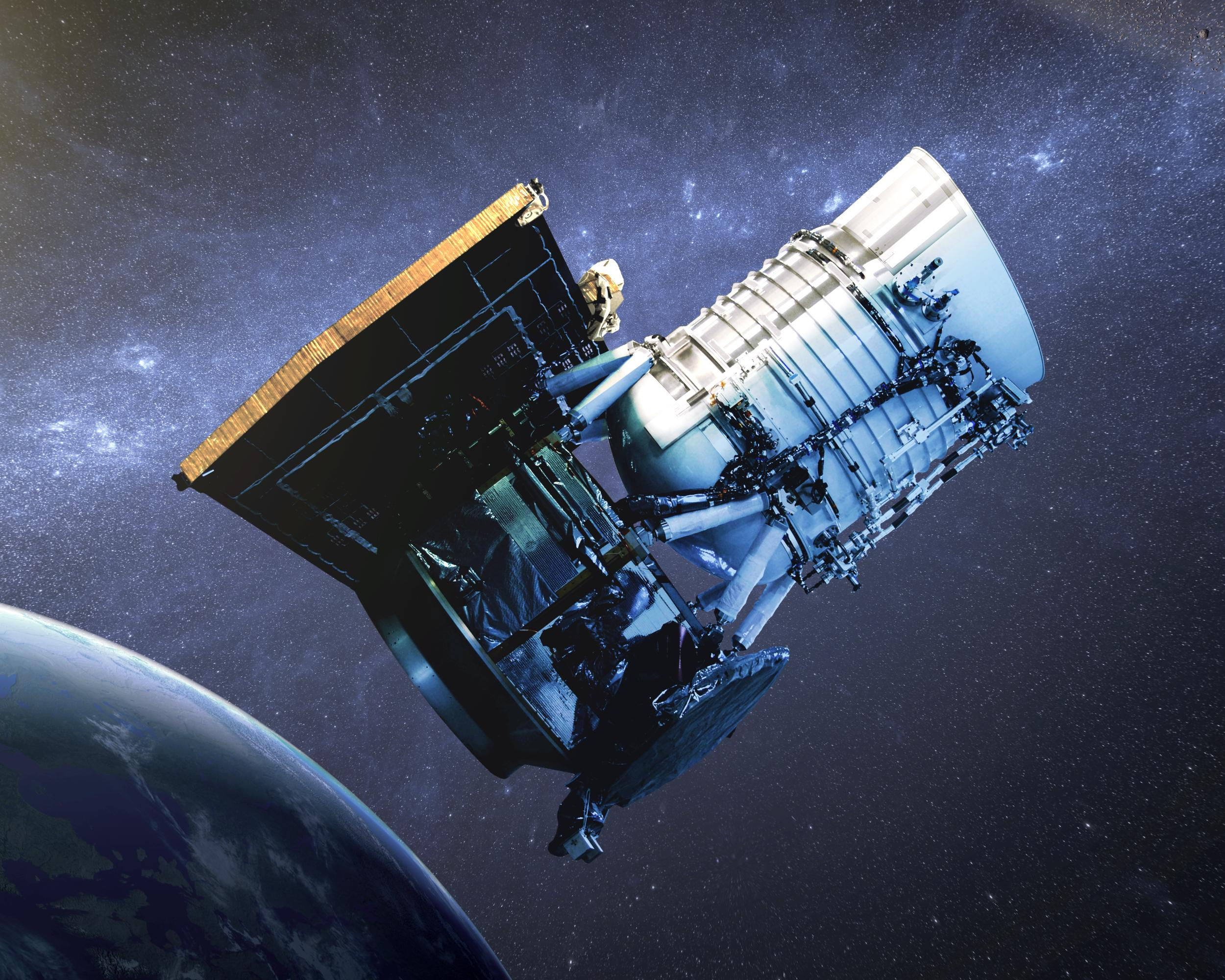
WISE was restarted after it was turned off

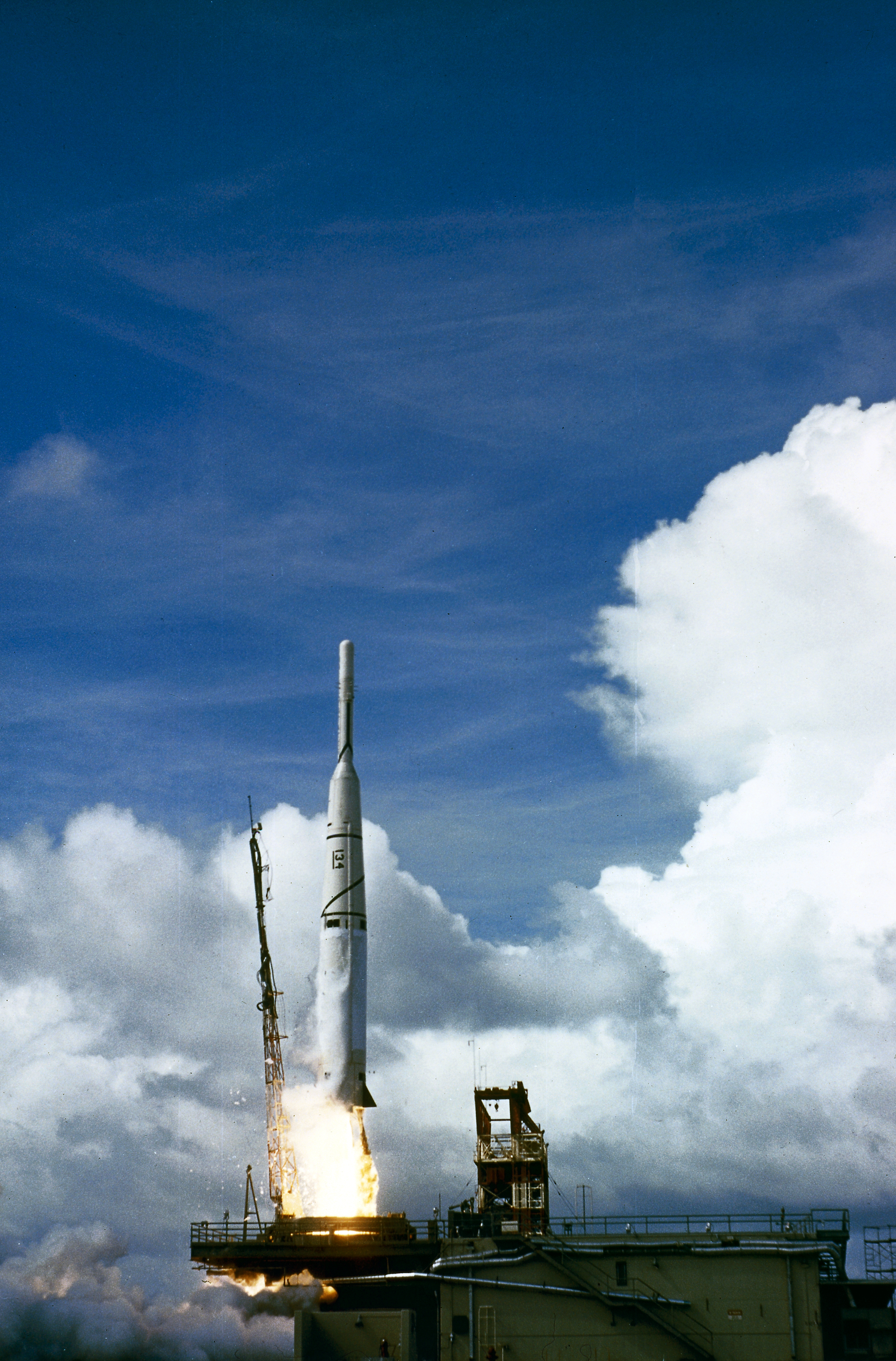
Explorer 6 on a Thor-Able III launch in August 1959

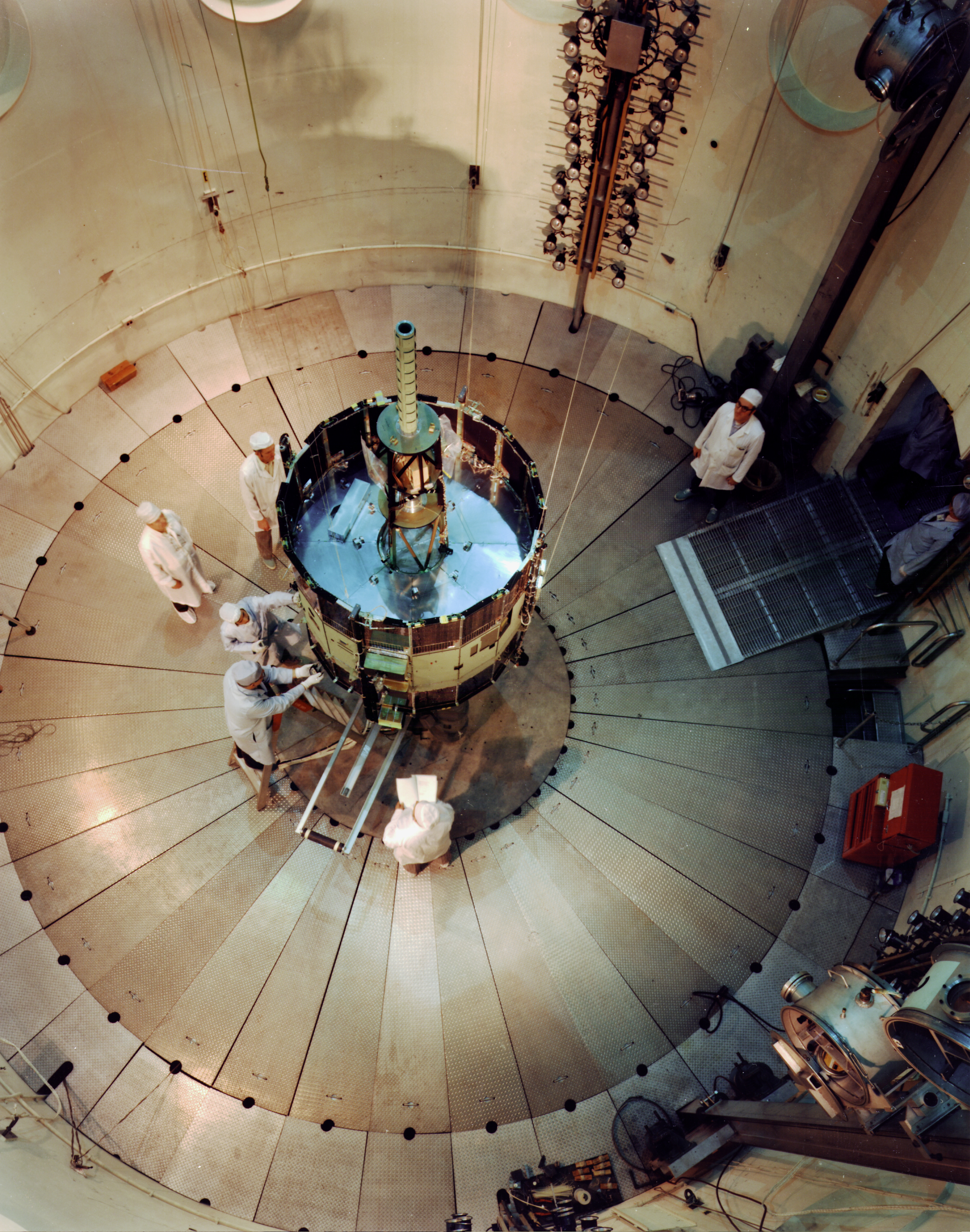
ISEE-C in a dynamic test chamber, 1978

Many missions are proposed, but not selected. For example, in 2011, the Explorers Program received 22 full missions solicitations, 20 Missions of Opportunity, and 8 USPI. Sometimes mission are only partially developed but must be stopped for financial, technological, or bureaucratic reasons. Some missions failed upon reaching orbit including WIRE and TERRIERS.

Examples of missions that were not developed or cancelled were:

- Owl 1 and 2 (cost, 1965)
- MSS A (Magnetic Storm Satellite, Explorer-A, 1970)
- CATSAT (STEDI 3) (cost)
- IMEX (UNEX 2) (cost)
- FAME (MIDEX 4)
- SPIDR (SMEX 8) (technical, 2003)
- GEMS (SMEX 13)

Recent examples of conclusions of launched missions, cancelled due to budgetary constraints:

- FAST - 2009
- TRACE - 2010 (Solar observatory, see Solar Dynamics Observatory)
- Wilkinson MAP - 2010
- WISE - 2011 (extended in 2013 as NEOWISE mission)
- RXTE - 2012
- Galaxy Evolution Explorer - 2013

== Launch statistics ==
Number of launches per decade:

Number of Explorer launches by decade
Decade
1950s	8
1960s	34
1970s	20
1980s	5
1990s	11
2000s	15
2010s	7
2020s	5

== See also ==
- Cosmic Vision, a European Space Agency (ESA) programme
- Cosmic Vision S-class missions, the European Space Agency equivalent to the Small Explorers Program
- Discovery program – Solar system exploration program by NASA
- New Frontiers program – Series of space exploration missions being conducted by NASA

== Notes ==
^a The first proposals for Rossi X-ray Timing Explorer (RXTE) mission were in 1974. Followed by participants of April 1979 Washington Workshop unanimously recommending that NASA should initiate such a mission as soon as possible.
^b The Advanced Composition Explorer (ACE) was proposed in 1986 as part of the Explorer Concept Study Program. The August 1997 launch was originally scheduled in 1993.
