= Dual Air Density Explorer =

NASA satellite of the Explorer program

Explorer (56)
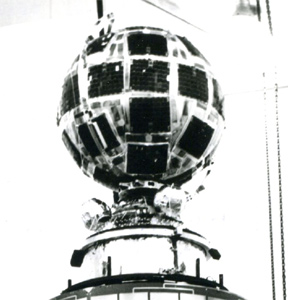
- Explorer (56) (DADE-A) satellite
- Names: DADE-A; Dual Air Density Explorer-A; DADE-B; Dual Air Density Explorer-B
- Mission type: Earth science
- Operator: NASA
- COSPAR ID: 1975-DADE-A
- Mission duration: Failed to orbit

Spacecraft properties
- Spacecraft: Explorer LVI
- Spacecraft type: Dual Air Density Explorer
- Bus: DADE
- Manufacturer: Langley Research Center
- Launch mass: 40 kg (88 lb)
- Power: Solar cells and batteries

Start of mission
- Launch date: 6 December 1975, 03:35:01 UTC
- Rocket: Scout F-1 (S-196C)
- Launch site: Vandenberg, SLC-5
- Contractor: Vought

End of mission
- Deactivated: Failed to orbit

Orbital parameters
- Reference system: Geocentric orbit (planned)
- Regime: Polar orbit
- Perigee altitude: 350 km (220 mi)
- Apogee altitude: 350 km (220 mi)
- Inclination: 90.10°
- Period: 90.00 minutes

Instruments
- Atmospheric Composition Mass Spectrometer; Atmospheric Drag Density

Dual Air Density Explorer was a set of 2 satellites, DADE-A and DADE-B, developed as part of NASA's Explorer program. DADE-A and DADE-B were launched on 6 December 1975 at 03:35:01 UTC, by a Scout F-1 launch vehicle from Space Launch Complex 5, Vandenberg Air Force Base, California. The launch of the DADE satellites failed.

== Spacecraft ==
The Dual Air Density Explorer-A (DADE-A) satellite was a 76 cm (30 in) rigid sphere designed to determine, in conjunction with Dual Air Density Explorer-B (DADE-B), the vertical structure of the upper thermosphere and the lower exosphere as a function of latitude, season, and local solar time. Both satellites would have been launched by a single Scout launch vehicle into coplanar polar orbits. Measurements of atmospheric density from DADE-A would have been obtained from satellite drag analyses near perigee (approximately 350 km (220 mi)) and from composition measurements taken by an onboard mass spectrometer. DADE-A was equipped with a radio beacon to facilitate tracking.

== Experiments ==
=== Atmospheric Composition Mass Spectrometer ===
The mass spectrometer experiment on DADE-A was designed to perform composition measurements in the upper thermosphere (approximately 350 km (220 mi)). The instrument was a magnetic mass spectrometer with a Mattauch-Herzog geometry and would have measured the distribution of such atmospheric constituents as oxygen, nitrogen, helium, hydrogen, neon and argon.

=== Atmospheric Drag Density ===
The atmospheric drag density experiment on DADE-A was designed to provide indirect measurements of upper thermospheric density near satellite perigee (approximately 350 km (220 mi)). The experiment had no unique onboard hardware. The density values would have been derived from sequential observations of the satellite's position. The experiment would have yielded systematic values of atmospheric density as a function of latitude, season, and local solar time.

== See also ==
- Explorer 39
- Explorer 55
- Explorer program
- International Sun-Earth Explorer 1
