= Explorer 16 =

NASA satellite of the Explorer program

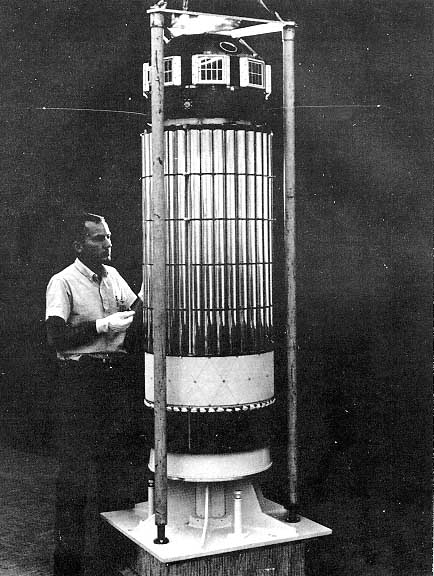
- Explorer 16 satellite
- Names: S-55B; NASA S-55B
- Mission type: Micrometeoroid research
- Operator: NASA
- Harvard designation: 1962 Beta Chi 1
- COSPAR ID: 1962-070A
- SATCAT no.: 00506
- Mission duration: 7.5 months (achieved); 62 years, 2 months, 17 days (in orbit)

Spacecraft properties
- Spacecraft: Explorer XVI
- Spacecraft type: Science Explorer
- Bus: S-55
- Manufacturer: Goddard Space Flight Center
- Launch mass: 100.8 kg (222 lb)
- Dimensions: 61 × 192 cm (24 × 76 in) cylinder
- Power: Solar cells and nickel-cadmium batteries

Start of mission
- Launch date: 16 December 1962, 14:33:04 GMT
- Rocket: Scout X-3 (S-115)
- Launch site: Wallops Flight Facility, LA-3
- Contractor: Vought
- Entered service: 16 December 1962

End of mission
- Last contact: Late July 1963

Orbital parameters
- Reference system: Geocentric orbit
- Regime: Low Earth orbit
- Perigee altitude: 750 km (470 mi)
- Apogee altitude: 1,181 km (734 mi)
- Inclination: 52.0°
- Period: 104.30 minutes

Instruments
Instruments
- Cadmium-Sulfide Cell Micrometeorite Detector
- Copper Wire Micrometeorite Detector
- Grid Detectors of Micrometeorites
- Micrometeorite Detector
- Pressurized Cell Micrometeorite Detector

Explorer 16, also called S-55B, was a NASA satellite launched as part of the Explorer program. Explorer 16 was launched on 16 December 1962, at 14:33:04 GMT, from Wallops Flight Facility, Virginia, with a Scout X-3.

== Mission ==
Explorer 16 was the second in the series of micrometeoroid satellites orbited by NASA. Its purpose was to obtain data on the near-Earth meteoroid environment, thus providing an accurate estimate of the probability of penetration in spacecraft structures by meteoroids and allowing a more confident definition of the relationship between penetration flux and material thickness to be derived.

== Spacecraft ==
The cylindrically shaped spacecraft, about 61 × 192 cm (24 × 76 in), with a mass of 100.8 kg (222 lb), was built around the burned-out fourth stage of the Scout launch vehicle that remained as part of the orbiting satellite.

== Instruments ==
Explorer 16 carried stainless steel pressurized-cell penetration detectors, impact detectors, capacitor detectors, and cadmium sulfide cell detectors to obtain data on the size, number, distribution, and momentum of dust particles in the near-Earth environment.

== Experiments ==
=== Cadmium-Sulfide Cell Micrometeorite Detector ===
This micrometeorite detector consisted of two cadmium-sulfide cells with a total effective area of 48-cm^{2}. Each cell was shielded by a microthin sheet of polymer plastic coated with aluminized Mylar 0.00063 cm (0.00025 in) thick. The detectors were mounted at the end of the cylindrical satellite casing just ahead of the antennas. When a micrometeoroid pierced the shield, it admitted light to the cell and changed the cell's resistance. Resistance was calibrated to the size of the micrometeoroid. Data were obtained from cell A for 20 days and from cell B for 55 days.

=== Copper Wire Micrometeorite Detector ===
This experiment was one of five micrometeorite detectors. There were 46 wire grid detectors consisting of a winding of five copper wires, 52-and 76-microns thick, mounted on 3.68 × 17.8 cm (1.45 × 7.01 in) rectangular melamine cards, to obtain measurements of micrometeoroid impact. Fourteen of the cards were wound with 0.05-mm wire and 32 cards with 0.076-mm wire, providing a total exposed area of 0.3 m^{2} to penetration by micrometeoroids. When a micrometeoroid broke the wires, the lowered resistance level of an electronic circuit was recorded. Impacts were measured separately on the satellite's two telemeters and were then relayed for transmission to Earth. During the 7.5 months in which the experiment transmitted useful data, telemeter A gave no indication of a break in either the 52-micron or the 76-micron copper wires on the card detectors. Telemeter B recorded one break in the 52-micron and 76-micron wire on 28 June 1963, and one in the 76-micron wire on 13 July 1963.

=== Grid Detectors of Micrometeorites ===
This experiment was one of five micrometeorite detectors. Sixty foil gauge detectors, each in the shape of an equilateral triangle with a 11.60 cm (4.57 in) base, were installed around the forward usable half of the fourth-stage launch vehicle support structure. Each detector consisted of a circuit obtained by an electrochemical deposition process, about 2.3E-3-mm thick attached to 0.025-mm Mylar and mounted on the underside of 304 stainless steel skin samples. Twenty-four of the skin samples were 0.025-mm thick, and four were 0.15-mm thick. The experiment utilized thin grids of conducting gold deposited on the bottom surface of three stainless steel sheets of different thickness to record micrometeoroid penetration. A particle penetrating the steel sheet would almost invariably break one of the current channels underneath, lowering its resistance level and recording the penetration. Six penetrations were recorded in the 25-micron stainless steel sheet, and one penetration was indicated in the 152-micron stainless steel sheet. The experiment functioned well in the 7.5 months in which the satellite transmitted useful micrometeoroid data.

=== Micrometeorite Detector ===
This experiment was one of five micrometeorite detectors. It used a piezoelectric impact detector to measure micrometeoroid population in a momentum range somewhat higher than that of previous measurements, where few data exist. The detectors, acoustically decoupled from the satellite structure, were mounted at the end of the cylindrical satellite casing near the antennas. The detectors provided a total of 0.35 m^{2} of area exposed to micrometeoroids. The momentum of a micrometeoroid impacting on the detector assembly was converted into an electrical impulse. The detector had three levels of sensitivity. Data from the impact detectors were correlated with those of micrometeoroid effects on materials in the pressurized cell experiment. The impact detector sent useful data for 7.5 months. By 1 July 1963, 15,000 meteoroid impacts had been recorded by the sensors.

=== Pressurized Cell Micrometeorite Detector ===
This experiment was one of five micrometeorite detectors. It utilized pressurized cells shaped like half cylinders with walls of 25-, 51-, and 127-micron-thick beryllium copper to record micrometeoroid impacts. The cells contained helium gas held under pressure. As a micrometeoroid punctured the cell wall, it released the gas and dropped the pressure. This drop in pressure activated an electronic circuit and transmitted this information to Earth. The pressurized-cell sensors were divided into two identical groups that were telemetered separately on the two telemeters. During the 7.5 months in which the experiment transmitted useful data, 44 punctures were indicated in the one hundred 25-micron beryllium copper walls, and none of the twenty 127-micron beryllium copper sensors was punctured. The puncture rate for the 25-micron material was 0.32 puncture per m^{2} per day, and the puncture rate for the 51-micron material was 0.19 puncture per m^{2} per day.

== Results ==
The spacecraft operated satisfactorily during its 7.5 months life (16 December 1962 to July 1963), and all mission objectives were accomplished.

== See also ==
- Explorer program
