= Heat Capacity Mapping Mission =

NASA satellite of the Explorer program

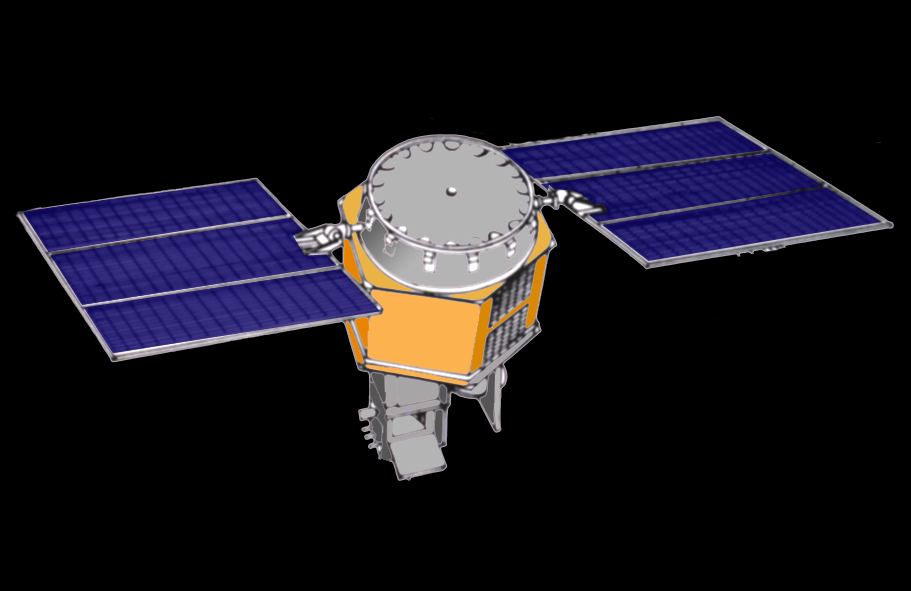
- HCMM satellite
- Names: Explorer 58; HCMM; AEM-A; Applications Explorer Mission-A
- Mission type: Cartography
- Operator: NASA
- COSPAR ID: 1978-041A
- SATCAT no.: 10818
- Mission duration: 2.4 years (achieved)

Spacecraft properties
- Spacecraft: Explorer LVIII
- Spacecraft type: Heat Capacity Mapping Mission
- Bus: Applications Explorer Mission
- Manufacturer: Goddard Space Flight Center
- Launch mass: 117 kg (258 lb)
- Power: Solar panels and batteries

Start of mission
- Launch date: 26 April 1978, 10:20 UTC
- Rocket: Scout D-1 (S-201C)
- Launch site: Vandenberg, SLC-5
- Contractor: Vought
- Entered service: 26 April 1978

End of mission
- Deactivated: 30 September 1980
- Last contact: 30 September 1980
- Decay date: 22 December 1981

Orbital parameters
- Reference system: Geocentric orbit
- Regime: Sun-synchronous orbit
- Perigee altitude: 558 km (347 mi)
- Apogee altitude: 646 km (401 mi)
- Inclination: 97.60°
- Period: 96.70 minutes

Instruments
- Heat Capacity Mapping Radiometer (HCMR)

The Heat Capacity Mapping Mission (HCMM) spacecraft was the first of a series of Applications Explorer Mission (AEM) of the Explorer program.

== Mission ==
The objective of the HCMM was to provide comprehensive, accurate, high-spatial-resolution thermal surveys of the surface of the Earth.

== Spacecraft ==
The HCMM spacecraft was made of two distinct modules: (1) an instrument module, containing the heat capacity mapping radiometer and its supporting gear, and (2) a base module, containing the data handling, power, communications, command, and attitude control subsystems required to support the instrument module. The spacecraft was spin stabilized at a rate of 14 rpm. The HCMM circular Sun-synchronous orbit allowed the spacecraft to sense surface temperatures near the maximum and minimum of the diurnal cycle. The orbit had a daylight ascending node with a nominal equatorial crossing time of 14:00 hours. Since there was no inclination adjustment capacity, the spacecraft drifted from this crossing time by about 1 hour earlier per year. There was no onboard data storage capability, so only real-time data were transmitted when the satellite came within the reception range of seven ground stations. The repeat cycle of the spacecraft was 16 days. Day/night coverage over a given area between the latitudes of 85°N and 85°S occurred at intervals ranging from 12 to 36 hours (once every 16 days).

== Experiment ==
=== Heat Capacity Mapping Radiometer (HCMR) ===
The objectives of the Heat Capacity Mapping Radiometer (HCMR) were (1) to produce thermal maps at the optimum times for making thermal-inertia studies for discrimination of rock types and mineral resources location, (2) to measure plant-canopy temperatures at frequent intervals to determine the transpiration of water and plant life, (3) to measure soil-moisture effects by observing the temperature cycle of soils, (4) to map thermal effluents, both natural and man-made, (5) to investigate the feasibility of geothermal source location by remote sensing, and (6) to provide frequent coverage of snow fields for water runoff prediction. The HCMR transmitted analog data in real-time to selected receiving stations. The radiometer was similar to the surface composition mapping radiometer (SCMR) of Nimbus 5 (1972-097A). The HCMR had a small instantaneous geometric field of view of 0.83 mrad, high radiometric accuracy, and a wide 716 km (445 mi) swath coverage on the ground so that selected areas were covered within the 12-hour period corresponding to the maximum and minimum of temperature observed. The instrument operated in two channels, 10.5 to 12.5 micrometers (IR) and 0.55 to 1.1 micrometers (visible). The spatial resolution was approximately 600 m (2,000 ft) at nadir for the Infrared (IR) channel, and 500 m (1,600 ft) for the visible channel. The instrument utilized a radiation cooler to cool the two Mercury cadmium telluride (|Hg-Cd-Te) detectors to 115 K. The experiment included an analog multiplexer that accepted the analog outputs of the detectors and multiplexed them in a form suitable for transmission by the spacecraft S-band transmitter. The instrument performed satisfactorily until the spacecraft operations terminated on 30 September 1980.

== Launch ==
HCMM was launched from Vandenberg Air Force Base on 26 April 1978 by a Scout D-1 launch vehicle. Its mass was 117 kg (258 lb).

== End of mission and entry ==
During 21-23 February 1980, the HCMM orbital altitude was lowered from 620 km (390 mi) to 540 km (340 mi) to stop the drift of the orbit plane to unfavorable Sun angles which in turn reduced the power collection capability of the solar panels. The operations of the spacecraft were terminated on 30 September 1980. HCMM re-entered in the Earth's atmosphere on 22 December 1981.

== See also ==
- Explorer program
