= International Magnetospheric Study =

The International Magnetospheric Study (IMS) was proposed in 1970 as a concerted effort to acquire coordinated ground-based, balloon, rocket, and satellite data needed to improve our understanding of the behavior of earth's plasma environment.

Projects done as a contribution to International Magnetospheric Study:

1. Prognoz 6
2. Scandinavian Magnetometer array
