= NASA Space Science Data Coordinated Archive =

Archive of NASA data

The NASA Space Science Data Coordinated Archive (NSSDCA) serves as the permanent archive for NASA space science mission data. "Space science" includes astronomy and astrophysics, solar and space plasma physics, and planetary and lunar science. As the permanent archive, NSSDCA teams with NASA's discipline-specific space science "active archives" which provide access to data to researchers and, in some cases, to the general public. NSSDCA also serves as NASA's permanent archive for space physics mission data. It provides access to several geophysical models and to data from some non-NASA mission data. NSSDCA was called the National Space Science Data Center (NSSDC) prior to March 2015.

NSSDCA supports active space physics and astrophysics researchers. Web-based services allow the NSSDCA to support the general public. This support is in the form of information about spacecraft and access to digital versions of selected imagery. NSSDCA also provides access to portions of their database contains information about data archived at NSSDCA (and, in some cases, other facilities), the spacecraft which generate space science data and experiments which generate space science data. NSSDCA services also included are data management standards and technologies.

NSSDCA is part of the Solar System Exploration Data Services Office (SSEDSO) in the Solar System Exploration Division at NASA's Goddard Space Flight Center. NSSDCA is sponsored by the Heliophysics Division of NASA's Science Mission Directorate. NSSDCA acts in concert with various NASA discipline data systems in providing certain data and services.

The archive has been unavailable or in maintenance mode since at least August 2025.

== Overview ==
NSSDCA was first established (as NSSDC) at Goddard Space Flight Center in 1966. NSSDCA's staff consists largely of physical scientists, computer scientists, analysts, programmers, and data technicians. Staffing level, including civil service and onsite contractors, has ranged between 15 and 100 over the life of NSSDCA. Early in its life, NSSDCA accumulated data primarily on 7-track and 9-track tape and on various photoproducts, and all data dissemination was via media replication and mailing. Starting in the mid-1980s, NSSDCA received and disseminated increasing data volumes via electronic networks. Dissemination formats are presently via the internet, either via HTTP or FTP.

== Astrophysics ==
- Data Services: contains data and mission information: The Multiwavelength Milky Way, the Multimedia Catalog and the NSSDC Photo Gallery.
- Flight Mission Information: contains lists of flight missions and information about them; this is where the NSSDC Master Catalog is along with mission-specific access. A graphical interface to mission information is in this area as well.
- Related Information Services: have detailed information about data held at NSSDC via the Master Catalog, NSSDC Lunar and Planetary Science, and NSSDC Heliophysics.
- NASA Astrophysics Data Archive/Service Centers: these include HEASARC (High Energy Astrophysics Science Archive Research Center), IRSA (Infrared Science Archives), LAMBDA (Legacy Archive for Microwave Background Data Analysis), MAST (Mikulski Archive for Space Telescopes).

== Master Catalog ==
The NSSDC Master Catalog is available for the queries pertaining to information about data that are archived at the NSSDC as well as for supplemental information via the following query mechanisms:

- Spacecraft Query. This interface allows queries to our database of orbital, suborbital, and interplanetary spacecraft.
- Experiment Query. This interface allows queries for information about scientific experiments that flew on-board various space missions.
- Data Collection Query. This interface allows queries for data that are tracked by NSSDC, primarily those that are currently archived here.
- Personnel Query. This interface allows queries for locator information for personnel that were associated with various missions and/or data collections submitted to NSSDC.
- Publication Query. This interface allows queries information about publications that are relevant to the data NSSDC archives or to the experiments and/or missions that accumulated the data. The publications so captured are not intended to be comprehensive bibliographies.
- Lunar and Planetary Map Query. This interface allows queries of the lunar and planetary maps that NSSDC currently has in stock.
- New and Updated Data Query. This interface allows queries for those data collections for which the NSSDC has recently acquired new data, either additions to existing collections or entirely new collections.
- Lunar and Planetary Events Query. This interface allows queries for events that have occurred which are related to the exploration of the Moon and the Solar System.

== See also ==
- Planetary Data System
- NASA/IPAC Extragalactic Database
- HEASARC
- Astrophysics Data System
- NSSTC
