= Explorer 20 =

NASA satellite of the Explorer program

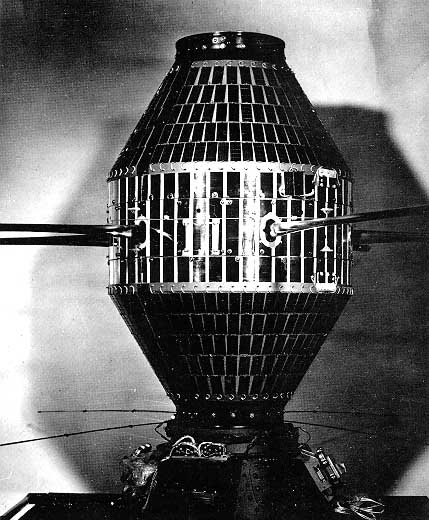
- Explorer 20 satellite
- Names: IE-A; Ionospheric Explorer-A; NASA S-48; TOPSI; Topside Explorer
- Mission type: Ionospheric research
- Operator: NASA
- COSPAR ID: 1964-051A
- SATCAT no.: 00870
- Mission duration: 12 months (planned); 16 months (achieved)

Spacecraft properties
- Spacecraft: Explorer XX
- Spacecraft type: Ionospheric Explorer
- Bus: IE
- Manufacturer: Cutler-Hammer
- Launch mass: 44.5 kg (98 lb)
- Power: Solar cells and batteries

Start of mission
- Launch date: 25 August 1964, 13:43 GMT
- Rocket: Scout X-4 (S-134R)
- Launch site: Vandenberg, SLC-5
- Contractor: Vought
- Entered service: 25 August 1964

End of mission
- Last contact: 20 December 1965

Orbital parameters
- Reference system: Geocentric orbit
- Regime: Low Earth orbit
- Perigee altitude: 864 km (537 mi)
- Apogee altitude: 1,025 km (637 mi)
- Inclination: 79.90°
- Period: 104.00 minutes

Instruments
- Cosmic Noise; Fixed-Frequency Ionosonde; Spherical Ion-Mass Spectrometer

Explorer 20, also known Ionosphere Explorer-A, IE-A, S-48, TOPSI and Topside Explorer, was a NASA satellite launched as part of Explorer program. Its purpose was two-fold: long-term investigation of the ionosphere from above, and in situ investigation of ion concentrations and temperatures.

== Spacecraft ==
Explorer 20 was a 44.5 kg (98 lb) satellite designed by Cutler-Hammer's Airborne Instrument Laboratory under the management of NASA's Goddard Space Flight Center. Its primary purpose was to measure ionospheric emissions from above ("topside-sounding"), between the satellite and about 320 km (200 mi) above the Earth's surface, where ionospheric electron concentration is at its highest. This data could then be compared and correlated with ionospheric data collected from the ground. In addition, Explorer 20 would measure electron distribution, ion density, and temperature, and to estimate cosmic noise.

Explorer 20 was a short cylinder capped at both ends by truncated cones. The satellite's primary experiment was a six-frequency ionospheric sounder: six sounding antennas (three dipoles) extended from the satellite equator, one pair of 18.28 m (60.0 ft) antennas forming the dipole used for low frequencies, the other two dipoles consisting of four 9.14 m (30.0 ft) antennas. The principal investigator for this experiment was the Central Radio Propagation Lab of the National Bureau of Standards. An ion mass-spectrometer, mounted on a short boom, extended from the upper cone and measured ion concentrations and temperatures in the satellite's immediate vicinity. Explorer 20 also measured cosmic emissions using the noise signal from the sounder receivers. This experiment was provided by the University College of London.

It was expected that information gathered from Explorer 20 would help in the study of long-range radio transmissions, particularly the cause of periodic radio black-outs.

== Launch ==
Originally planned for launch in March 1964, electrical issues with the Scout X-4 booster's harness and subsequent pad requirements resulted in five months of delay. On 25 August 1964, at 13:43 GMT, Explorer 20 was launched into a near-perfect orbit, with an apogee of 1,025 km (637 mi) and a perigee of 864 km (537 mi), an inclination to the equator of 79.90°, and a period of 104.00 minutes. Upon reaching orbit, the antennas extended from the spacecraft, and tests of the primary and secondary experiments were completed within the first orbit. The satellite was spin stabilized at 1.53 rpm just after antenna extension, with the spin axis initially very close to the orbit plane. After a year in orbit, the spin had slowed to 0.45 rpm.

== Instruments ==
- Cosmic Noise
- Fixed-Frequency Ionosonde
- Spherical Ion-Mass Spectrometer

== Experiments ==
=== Cosmic Noise ===
The cosmic noise experiment utilized the noise signal from the sounder receiver to investigate cosmic noise in the 1.5- to 7.2 MHz frequency range. The measurements were in rough agreement with previous observations of cosmic noise. The receiver calibration, however, was not sufficiently accurate to yield new scientific results.

=== Fixed-Frequency Ionosonde ===
The purpose of the fixed-frequency ionosonde was to investigate ionospheric electron density in the altitude range 300 km (190 mi) to 1,000 km (620 mi). The experiment was most useful for the study of irregularities in the electron density distribution and for the investigation of fine structure in the plasma resonances. The fixed-frequency ionosonde was a radio transmitter-receiver that recorded the time delay between a transmitted and a returned radio pulse. Six specific frequencies from 1.5 to 7.22-MHz were sampled in sequence once every 0.105-second. Several delay times were often observed for each frequency due to plasma resonances, birefringence of the ionosphere, nonvertical propagation, etc. Delay time was primarily a function of distance traversed by the signal, electron density along the signal path, and the mode of propagation. A total of 1450 hours of data was acquired. Most of these data were of adequate quality to prepare ionograms. Since only time is noted on each ionogram, satellite position and other related information must be obtained from world maps.

=== Spherical Ion-Mass Spectrometer ===
The ion probe on Explorer 20 was a spherical retarding potential instrument from which ion mass spectra and ion temperatures could be determined. It consisted of a spherical inner electrode, 9 cm (3.5 in) in diameter, surrounded by a spherical, gridded (0.5-mm holes), nickel foil covering, 10 cm (3.9 in) in diameter and 0.1-mm thick. A negative charge was maintained in the grid to remove electron effects. The more massive ions passed through the grid to form an ion current dependent upon the voltage condition of the inner electrode. A slow-sweeping sawtooth potential from about -2 to +10 volts (with two low-voltage, 0.5- and 3.2-kHz sinewave forms impressed upon it) provided a profile of voltage versus ion current. The change in slope of the voltage versus ion current profile, gives the energy distribution profile, which, for thermal ions, is a function of ion mass and satellite velocity. Thermal ion velocities broaden the mass peaks somewhat and thereby degrade mass resolution slightly, but this broadening effect was used to determine the ion temperature. Analysis of current variations resulting from the two sinewave forms on the sweep voltage, provided the required slope change data for analysis of the profiles. The probe was mounted at the positive end of the spin (Z) axis on a short tubular support. With the nominal spin axis, perpendicular to the orbit plane, this arrangement eliminated spin modulation of the observations. Although this experiment functioned properly, the occurrence of a large plasma sheath about the spacecraft, prevented acquisition of scientifically useful data.

== Results ==
Explorer 20 was not equipped with a tape recorder, so data were only received when the satellite was in sight of ground telemetry stations, located to provide primary data coverage near 80° West plus areas near Hawaii (United States), Singapore, United Kingdom, Australia, and Africa. Data were recorded for periods of 1/2 hour to over 4 hours per day depending upon available power. The experiments operated satisfactorily for about 16 months, despite problems with telemetry and interference. The ion probe was rendered useless due to large spacecraft plasma sheath that developed around the spacecraft, and efforts to compensate proved fruitless.

The satellite's responses to command signals became undependable after 20 December 1965, and the satellite transmitter often spuriously turned on. Though equipped with a one-year automatic satellite turnoff, this device was disconnected just prior to launch. Explorer 20 did not respond to a turnoff command after its performance became erratic.

== See also ==
- Explorer program
