= List of Scout launches =

This is a list of launches made by the Scout rocket.

== Launch charts ==
=== Launch outcomes ===
- Failure
- Partial Failure
- Success

=== Launch site ===
- Wallops, LA-3
- Wallops, LA-3A
- Vandenberg, SLC-5
- San Marco Platform
- Cape Canaveral, LC-18B

=== Launch configuration ===
- Scout X
- Blue Scout
- Scout A
- Scout B
- Scout D
- Scout E
- Scout F
- Scout G

=== Launch destination ===
- Suborbital
- Low Earth Orbit
- High Earth Orbit

== Tables ==
=== Launches by vehicle ===
Vehicle	Launches	Successes	Failures
Blue Scout II	1	0	1
Scout X-1	4	1	3
Scout X-2	4	1	3
Scout X-3	6	5	1
Scout X-4	12	11	1
Scout A	13	12	1
Scout B	24	23	1
Scout D	15	15	0
Scout E	1	1	0
Scout F	2	1	1
Scout G	17	17	0

=== Launches by decade ===
Year	Launches	Success	Failures
1960-69	53	42	11
1970-79	30	29	1
1980-89	11	11	0
1990-99	5	5	0

== Launch history ==
Date/time (UTC)	Configuration	Serial number	Launch site	Outcome
Date/time (UTC)	Payload	Separation orbit	Operator	Function
Date/time (UTC)	Remarks			
=== 1960 ===
18 April 1960; 23:09	Scout X	X-1	Wallops LA-3	Failure
18 April 1960; 23:09	N/A	Suborbital (planned)	NASA	Test flight
2 July 1960; 00:04	Scout X-1	ST-1	Wallops LA-3	Failure
2 July 1960; 00:04	N/A	Suborbital (planned)	NASA	Test flight
4 October 1960; 15:23	Scout X-1	ST-2	Wallops LA-3	Successful
4 October 1960; 15:23	N/A	Suborbital	NASA	Test flight
4 December 1960; 21:14	Scout X-1	ST-3	Wallops LA-3	Failure
4 December 1960; 21:14	Explorer S-56	Low Earth (planned)	NASA	Technology
=== 1961 ===
7 January 1961; 17:33	Blue Scout I	D-3	Cape Canaveral LC-18B	Successful
7 January 1961; 17:33	N/A	Suborbital	USAF	Test flight
16 February 1961; 13:05	Scout X-1	ST-4	Wallops LA-3	Successful
16 February 1961; 13:05	Explorer 9	Low Earth	NASA	Technology
3 March 1961; 16:02	Blue Scout II	D-4	Cape Canaveral LC-18B	Successful
3 March 1961; 16:02	N/A	Suborbital	USAF	Test flight
12 April 1961; 06:07	Blue Scout II	D-5	Cape Canaveral LC-18B	Successful
12 April 1961; 06:07	N/A	Suborbital	USAF	Test flight
9 May 1961; 16:00	Blue Scout I	D-6	Cape Canaveral LC-18B	Successful
9 May 1961; 16:00	N/A	Suborbital	USAF	Test flight
30 June 1961; 17:09	Scout X-1	ST-5	Wallops LA-3	Failure
30 June 1961; 17:09	Explorer S-55	Low Earth (planned)	NASA	Micrometeorite Research
25 August 1961; 18:29	Scout X-1	ST-6	Wallops LA-3	Partial Failure
25 August 1961; 18:29	Explorer 13	Low Earth	NASA	Micrometeorite Research
19 October 1961; 17:38	Scout X-1	ST-7	Wallops LA-3	Successful
19 October 1961; 17:38	P-21	Suborbital	NASA	Ionospheric research
1 November 1961; 15:32	Blue Scout II	D-8	Cape Canaveral LC-18B	Failure
1 November 1961; 15:32	Mercury-Scout 1	Low Earth (planned)	NASA	Technology
=== 1962 ===
1 March 1962; 05:07	Scout X-1A	ST-8	Wallops LA-3	Successful
1 March 1962; 05:07	Re-Entry 1	Suborbital	NASA	Test flight
29 March 1962; 07:27	Scout X-2	ST-9	Wallops LA-3	Successful
29 March 1962; 07:27	P-21A	Suborbital	NASA	Ionospheric research
12 April 1962; 16:00	Blue Scout I	D-7	Cape Canaveral LC-18B	Successful
12 April 1962; 16:00	N/A	Suborbital	USAF	Test flight
26 April 1962; 10:49	Scout X-2	S111	Vandenberg SLC-5	Failure
26 April 1962; 10:49	Solrad 4B	Low Earth (planned)	NRL	Reconnaissance/Ionospheric research
24 May 1962 ?	Scout X-2M	S112	Vandenberg SLC-5	Failure
24 May 1962 ?	DSAP-1 F1	Low Earth (planned)	USAF	Meteorology
23 August 1962; 11:44	Scout X-2M	S117	Vandenberg SLC-5	Successful
23 August 1962; 11:44	DSAP-1 F2	Low Earth	USAF	Meteorology
31 August 1962; 16:25	Scout X-3A	S114	Wallops LA-3	Failure
31 August 1962; 16:25	Re-Entry 2	Suborbital (planned)	NASA	Test flight
16 December 1962; 14:33	Scout X-3	S115	Wallops LA-3	Successful
16 December 1962; 14:33	Explorer 16	Low Earth	NASA	Micrometeorite Research
19 December 1962; 01:25	Scout X-3	S118	Vandenberg SLC-5	Successful
19 December 1962; 01:25	Transit-5A 1	Low Earth	USAF	Navigation
=== 1963 ===
19 February 1963; 16:33	Scout X-3M	S126	Vandenberg SLC-5	Successful
19 February 1963; 16:33	DSAP-1 F3	Low Earth	USAF	Meteorology
5 April 1963; 03:01	Scout X-3	S119	Vandenberg SLC-5	Failure
5 April 1963; 03:01	Transit-5A 2	Low Earth (planned)	USAF	Navigation
26 April 1963 ?	Scout X-2M	S121	Vandenberg SLC-5	Failure
26 April 1963 ?	DSAP-1 F4	Low Earth (planned)	USAF	Meteorology
22 May 1963; 04:38	Scout X-3	S116	Wallops LA-3	Successful
22 May 1963; 04:38	RFD-1	Suborbital	NASA	Re-entry test
16 June 1963; 01:49	Scout X-3	S120	Vandenberg SLC-5	Successful
16 June 1963; 01:49	Transit-5A 3	Low Earth	USAF	Navigation
28 June 1963; 21:19	Scout X-4	S113	Vandenberg SLC-5	Successful
28 June 1963; 21:19	CRL-1 (GRS)	Low Earth	USAF CRL	Geophysics
20 July 1963; 05:44	Scout X-3A	S110	Wallops LA-3	Failure
20 July 1963; 05:44	Re-Entry 3	Suborbital (planned)	NASA	Re-entry test
27 September 1963; 11:17	Scout X-2B	S132	Vandenberg SLC-5	Failure
27 September 1963; 11:17	DSAP-1 F5	Low Earth (planned)	USAF	Meteorology
19 December 1963; 18:49	Scout X-4	S122R	Vandenberg SLC-5	Successful
19 December 1963; 18:49	Explorer 19	Low Earth	NASA	Atmospheric Research
=== 1964 ===
27 March 1964; 17:25	Scout X-3	S127R	Wallops LA-3	Successful
27 March 1964; 17:25	Ariel 2	Low Earth	SERC	Ionopheric Research
4 June 1964; 03:50	Scout X-4	S125R	Vandenberg SLC-5	Successful
4 June 1964; 03:50	Transit-5C 1	Low Earth	USAF	Navigation
25 June 1964; 01:40	Scout X-4	S128R	Vandenberg SLC-5	Failure
25 June 1964; 01:40	CRL-2 (ESRS)	Low Earth (planned)	USAF CRL	Ionospheric Research
20 July 1964; 10:53	Scout X-4	S124R	Wallops LA-3A	Successful
20 July 1964; 10:53	SERT-1	Suborbital	NASA	Technology
18 August 1964; 06:05	Scout X-4A	S129R	Wallops LA-3	Successful
18 August 1964; 06:05	Re-Entry 4A	Suborbital	NASA	Re-entry test
25 August 1964; 13:43	Scout X-4	S134R	Vandenberg SLC-5	Successful
25 August 1964; 13:43	Explorer 20	Low Earth	NASA	Ionospheric Research
9 October 1964; 04:04	Scout X-3C	S130R	Wallops LA-3A	Successful
9 October 1964; 04:04	RFD-2	Suborbital	NASA	Re-entry test
10 October 1964; 03:01	Scout X-4	S123R	Vandenberg SLC-5	Successful
10 October 1964; 03:01	Explorer 22	Low Earth	NASA	Geodesy/Ionospheric Research
6 November 1964; 12:02	Scout X-4	S133R	Wallops LA-3A	Successful
6 November 1964; 12:02	Explorer 23	Low Earth	NASA	Micrometeorite Research
21 November 1964; 17:09	Scout X-4	S135R	Vandenberg SLC-5	Successful
21 November 1964; 17:09	Explorer 24; Explorer 25	Low Earth	NASA	Atmospheric Research
15 December 1964; 20:20	Scout X-4	S137R	Wallops LA-3A	Successful
15 December 1964; 20:20	San Marco 1	Low Earth	CNR	Atmospheric Research
15 December 1964; 20:20	First Italian satellite			
=== 1965 ===
29 April 1965; 14:17	Scout X-4	S136R	Wallops LA-3A	Successful
29 April 1965; 14:17	Explorer 27	Low Earth	NASA	Geodesy/Ionospheric Research
10 August 1965; 17:54	Scout B	S131R	Wallops LA-3A	Successful
10 August 1965; 17:54	SECOR-5; SEV	Low Earth	US Army; NASA	Geodesy; Technology
19 November 1965; 04:48	Scout X-4	S138R	Wallops LA-3A	Successful
19 November 1965; 04:48	Explorer 30	Low Earth	NASA	Solar Research
6 December 1965; 21:05	Scout X-4	S139R	Vandenberg SLC-5	Successful
6 December 1965; 21:05	FR-1	Low Earth	CNES	Ionospheric Research
22 December 1965; 04:33	Scout A	S140C	Vandenberg SLC-5	Successful
22 December 1965; 04:33	Transit-O 6	Low Earth	USAF	Navigation
=== 1966 ===
28 January 1966; 17:06	Scout A	S142C	Vandenberg SLC-5	Successful
28 January 1966; 17:06	Transit-O 7	Low Earth	USAF	Navigation
10 February 1966; 00:55	Scout X-4A	S141C	Wallops LA-3A	Successful
10 February 1966; 00:55	Re-Entry 4B	Suborbital	NASA	Re-entry test
26 March 1966; 03:31	Scout A	S143C	Vandenberg SLC-5	Successful
26 March 1966; 03:31	Transit-O 8	Low Earth	USAF	Navigation
22 April 1966; 09:45	Scout B	S145C	Vandenberg SLC-5	Successful
22 April 1966; 09:45	OV3-1	Low Earth	USAF	Ionospheric Research
19 May 1966; 02:27	Scout A	S146C	Vandenberg SLC-5	Successful
19 May 1966; 02:27	Transit-O 9	Low Earth	USAF	Navigation
10 June 1966; 04:15	Scout B	S147C	Wallops LA-3A	Successful
10 June 1966; 04:15	OV3-4	Low Earth	USAF	Ionospheric Research
4 August 1966; 10:45	Scout B	S148C	Vandenberg SLC-5	Successful
4 August 1966; 10:45	OV3-3	Low Earth	USAF	Ionospheric Research
18 August 1966; 02:25	Scout A	S149C	Vandenberg SLC-5	Successful
18 August 1966; 02:25	Transit-O 10	Low Earth	USAF	Navigation
28 October 1966; 11:56	Scout B	S150C	Vandenberg SLC-5	Successful
28 October 1966; 11:56	OV3-2	Low Earth	USAF	Ionospheric Research
=== 1967 ===
31 January 1967; 12:45	Scout B	S151C	Vandenberg SLC-5	Failure
31 January 1967; 12:45	OV3-5	Low Earth (planned)	USAF	Ionospheric Research
14 April 1967; 03:25	Scout A	S154C	Vandenberg SLC-5	Successful
14 April 1967; 03:25	Transit-O 12	Low Earth	USAF	Navigation
26 April 1967; 10:06	Scout B	S153C	San Marco	Successful
26 April 1967; 10:06	San Marco 2	Low Earth	CRN	Atmospheric Research
5 May 1967; 16:00	Scout A	S155C	Vandenberg SLC-5	Successful
5 May 1967; 16:00	Ariel 3	Low Earth	SERC	Ionospheric Research
18 May 1967; 09:05	Scout A	S156C	Vandenberg SLC-5	Successful
18 May 1967; 09:05	Transit-O 13	Low Earth	USAF	Navigation
30 May 1967; 02:06	Scout A	S152C	Vandenberg SLC-5	Failure
30 May 1967; 02:06	ESRO 2A	Low Earth (planned)	ESRO	Ionospheric Research
25 September 1967; 08:25	Scout A	S157C	Vandenberg SLC-5	Successful
25 September 1967; 08:25	Transit-O 14	Low Earth	USAF	Navigation
19 October 1967; 17:33	Scout B	S159C	Wallops LA-3A	Successful
19 October 1967; 17:33	RAM-C1	Suborbital	NASA	Re-entry test
5 December 1967; 01:03	Scout B	S158C	Vandenberg SLC-5	Successful
5 December 1967; 01:03	OV3-6	Low Earth	USAF	Ionospheric Research
=== 1968 ===
2 March 1968; 03:55	Scout A	S162C	Vandenberg SLC-5	Successful
2 March 1968; 03:55	Transit-O 18	Low Earth	USAF	Navigation
5 March 1968; 18:28	Scout B	S160C	Wallops LA-3A	Successful
5 March 1968; 18:28	Explorer 37	Low Earth	NASA	Solar Research
27 April 1968; 05:19	Scout X-5C	S164C	Wallops LA-3A	Successful
27 April 1968; 05:19	Re-Entry 5	Suborbital	NASA	Re-entry test
17 May 1968; 02:06	Scout B	S161C	Vandenberg SLC-5	Successful
17 May 1968; 02:06	ESRO 2B	Low Earth	ESRO	Ionospheric Research
8 August 1968; 20:12	Scout B	S165C	Vandenberg SLC-5	Successful
8 August 1968; 20:12	Explorer 39; Explorer 40	Low Earth	NASA	Atmospheric/Ionospheric Research
22 August 1968; 15:16	Scout B	S168C	Wallops LA-3A	Successful
22 August 1968; 15:16	RAM-C2	Suborbital	NASA	Re-entry test
3 October 1968; 20:49	Scout B	S167C	Vandenberg SLC-5	Successful
3 October 1968; 20:49	ESRO 1A (Aurorae)	Low Earth	ESRO	Ionospheric Research
=== 1969 ===
1 October 1969; 22:29	Scout B	S172C	Vandenberg SLC-5	Successful
1 October 1969; 22:29	ESRO 1B (Boreas)	Low Earth	ESRO	Ionospheric Research
8 November 1969; 01:52	Scout B	S169C	Vandenberg SLC-5	Successful
8 November 1969; 01:52	Azur (GRS-1)	Low Earth	DLR	Ionospheric Research
=== 1970 ===
27 August 1970; 13:23	Scout A	S176C	Vandenberg SLC-5	Successful
27 August 1970; 13:23	Transit-O 19	Low Earth	USAF	Navigation
30 September 1970; 20:06	Scout B	S171C	Wallops LA-3A	Successful
30 September 1970; 20:06	RAM-C3	Suborbital	NASA	Re-entry test
9 November 1970; 06:00	Scout B	S174C	Wallops LA-3A	Successful
9 November 1970; 06:00	OFO	Low Earth	NASA	Life Sciences
12 December 1970; 10:53	Scout B	S175C	San Marco	Successful
12 December 1970; 10:53	Explorer 42 (Uhuru)	Low Earth	NASA	X-ray Astronomy
=== 1971 ===
24 April 1971; 07:32	Scout B	S173C	San Marco	Successful
24 April 1971; 07:32	San Marco 3	Low Earth	ASI	Atmospheric Research
20 June 1971; 19:31	Scout B	S144CR	Wallops LA-3A	Successful
20 June 1971; 19:31	PAET	Suborbital	NASA	Re-entry test
8 July 1971; 22:58	Scout B	S177C	Wallops LA-3A	Successful
8 July 1971; 22:58	Explorer 44	Low Earth	NASA	Solar Research
16 August 1971; 18:39	Scout B-1	S180C	Wallops LA-3A	Successful
16 August 1971; 18:39	Eole	Low Earth	CNES	Data Relay
20 September 1971; 23:31	Scout B	S166C	Wallops LA-3A	Successful
20 September 1971; 23:31	BIC	Suborbital	NASA/DLR	Ionospheric Research
15 November 1971; 05:52	Scout B	S163CR	San Marco	Successful
15 November 1971; 05:52	Explorer 45	High Earth	NASA	Magnetosphere Research
11 December 1971; 20:47	Scout B-1	S183C	Vandenberg SLC-5	Successful
11 December 1971; 20:47	Ariel 4	Low Earth	SERC	Ionospheric Research
=== 1972 ===
13 August 1972; 15:10	Scout D-1	S184C	Wallops LA-3A	Successful
13 August 1972; 15:10	Explorer 46	Low Earth	NASA	Micrometeorite Research
2 September 1972; 17:50	Scout B-1	S182C	Vandenberg SLC-5	Successful
2 September 1972; 17:50	Triad 1	Low Earth	USAF	Navigation
15 November 1972; 22:13	Scout D-1	S170CR	San Marco	Successful
15 November 1972; 22:13	Explorer 48 (SAS-B)	Low Earth	NASA	Astronomy
22 November 1972; 00:17	Scout D-1	S185C	Vandenberg SLC-5	Successful
22 November 1972; 00:17	ESRO 4	Low Earth	ESRO	Ionospheric Research
16 December 1972; 11:24	Scout D-1	S181C	Vandenberg SLC-5	Successful
16 December 1972; 11:24	Aeros-A	Low Earth	DLR/NASA	Ionospheric Research
=== 1973 ===
30 October 1973; 00:37	Scout A-1	S178C	Vandenberg SLC-5	Successful
30 October 1973; 00:37	Transit-O 20	Low Earth	USAF	Navigation
=== 1974 ===
18 February 1974; 10:05	Scout D-1	S190C	San Marco	Successful
18 February 1974; 10:05	San Marco 4	Low Earth	ASI	Atmospheric Research
9 March 1974; 02:22	Scout D-1	S188C	Vandenberg SLC-5	Successful
9 March 1974; 02:22	Miranda (X-4)	Low Earth	SERC	Technology
3 June 1974; 23:09	Scout E-1	S191C	Vandenberg SLC-5	Successful
3 June 1974; 23:09	Explorer 52	High Earth	NASA	Magnetosphere Research
16 July 1974; 11:51	Scout D-1	S186C	Vandenberg SLC-5	Successful
16 July 1974; 11:51	Aeros-B	Low Earth	DLR/NASA	Ionospheric Research
30 August 1974; 14:07	Scout D-1	S189C	Vandenberg SLC-5	Successful
30 August 1974; 14:07	ANS	Low Earth	NIVR/NASA	Astronomy
15 October 1974; 07:47	Scout B-1	S187C	San Marco	Successful
15 October 1974; 07:47	Ariel 5	Low Earth	SERC	Astronomy
=== 1975 ===
7 May 1975; 22:45	Scout F-1	S194C	San Marco	Successful
7 May 1975; 22:45	Explorer 53 (SAS-C)	Low Earth	NASA	Astronomy
12 October 1975; 06:39	Scout D-1	S195C	Vandenberg SLC-5	Successful
12 October 1975; 06:39	Triad 2	Low Earth	USAF	Navigation
6 December 1975; 03:35	Scout F-1	S196C	Vandenberg SLC-5	Failure
6 December 1975; 03:35	Dual Air Density Explorer	Low Earth (planned)	NASA	Atmospheric Research
=== 1976 ===
22 May 1976; 07:42	Scout B-1	S179CR	Vandenberg SLC-5	Successful
22 May 1976; 07:42	Wideband (STP P76-5)	Low Earth	USAF	Ionospheric Research
18 June 1976; 11:41	Scout D-1	S193C	Wallops LA-3A	Successful
18 June 1976; 11:41	Gravity Probe A	Suborbital	NASA	Cosmology Research
1 September 1976; 21:14	Scout D-1	S197C	Vandenberg SLC-5	Successful
1 September 1976; 21:14	Triad 3	Low Earth	USAF	Navigation
=== 1977 ===
28 October 1977; 04:52	Scout D-1	S200C	Vandenberg SLC-5	Successful
28 October 1977; 04:52	Transat (Transit-O 11)	Low Earth	USAF	Navigation/Technology
=== 1978 ===
26 April 1978; 10:20	Scout D-1	S201C	Vandenberg SLC-5	Successful
26 April 1978; 10:20	Explorer 56 (HCMM)	Low Earth	NASA	Earth Observation
=== 1979 ===
18 February 1979; 16:18	Scout D-1	S202C	Wallops LA-3A	Successful
18 February 1979; 16:18	Explorer 60 (SAGE)	Low Earth	NASA	Atmospheric Research
2 June 1979; 23:26	Scout D-1	S198C	Wallops LA-3A	Successful
2 June 1979; 23:26	Ariel 6	Low Earth	SERC	Astronomy
30 October 1979; 14:16	Scout G-1	S203C	Vandenberg SLC-5	Successful
30 October 1979; 14:16	Explorer 61 (Magsat)	Low Earth	NASA	Magnetosphere Research
=== 1981 ===
15 May 1981; 06:07	Scout G-1	S192C	Vandenberg SLC-5	Successful
15 May 1981; 06:07	Nova 1	Low Earth	USAF	Navigation
=== 1983 ===
27 June 1983; 15:37	Scout D-1	S205C	Vandenberg SLC-5	Successful
27 June 1983; 15:37	HILAT (STP P83-1)	Low Earth	USAF	Ionospheric Research
=== 1984 ===
12 October 1984; 01:43	Scout G-1	S208C	Vandenberg SLC-5	Successful
12 October 1984; 01:43	Nova 3	Low Earth	USAF	Navigation
=== 1985 ===
3 August 1985; 03:31	Scout G-1	S209C	Vandenberg SLC-5	Successful
3 August 1985; 03:31	Transit-O 24; Transit-O 30	Low Earth	USAF	Navigation
13 December 1985; 02:35	Scout G-1	S207C	Wallops LA-3A	Successful
13 December 1985; 02:35	ITV-1 (USA-13); ITV-2 (USA-14)	Low Earth	USAF	ASAT target
=== 1986 ===
14 November 1986; 00:23	Scout G-1	S199C	Vandenberg SLC-5	Successful
14 November 1986; 00:23	Polar BEAR (STP P87-1)	Low Earth	USAF	Ionospheric Research
=== 1987 ===
16 September 1987; 19:22	Scout G-1	S204C	Vandenberg SLC-5	Successful
16 September 1987; 19:22	Transit-O 27; Transit-O 29	Low Earth	USAF	Navigation
=== 1988 ===
25 March 1988; 19:50	Scout G-1	S206C	San Marco	Successful
25 March 1988; 19:50	San Marco 5	Low Earth	ASI	Atmospheric Research
26 April 1988; 01:57	Scout G-1	S211C	Vandenberg SLC-5	Successful
26 April 1988; 01:57	Transit-O 23; Transit-O 32	Low Earth	USAF	Navigation
16 June 1988; 06:54	Scout G-1	S213C	Vandenberg SLC-5	Successful
16 June 1988; 06:54	Nova 2	Low Earth	USAF	Navigation
25 August 1988; 06:59	Scout G-1	S214C	Vandenberg SLC-5	Successful
25 August 1988; 06:59	Transit-O 25; Transit-O 31	Low Earth	USAF	Navigation
=== 1990 ===
9 May 1990; 17:50	Scout G-1	S212C	Vandenberg SLC-5	Successful
9 May 1990; 17:50	MACSAT-1; MACSAT-2	Low Earth	DARPA	Communication/Technology
=== 1991 ===
29 June 1991; 14:00	Scout G-1	S216C	Vandenberg SLC-5	Successful
29 June 1991; 14:00	REX (STP P89-1A)	Low Earth	USAF	Ionospheric Research
=== 1992 ===
3 July 1992; 14:19	Scout G-1	S215C	Vandenberg SLC-5	Successful
3 July 1992; 14:19	SAMPEX (Explorer 68)	Low Earth	NASA	Solar Research
21 November 1992; 13:45	Scout G-1	S210C	Vandenberg SLC-5	Successful
21 November 1992; 13:45	MSTI-1	Low Earth	SDIO	Technology
=== 1993 ===
25 June 1993; 23:30	Scout G-1	S217C	Vandenberg SLC-5	Successful
25 June 1993; 23:30	RADCAL (STP P92-1)	Low Earth	USAF	Radar calibration
=== 1994 ===
9 May 1994; 02:47	Scout G-1	S218C	Vandenberg SLC-5	Successful
9 May 1994; 02:47	MSTI-2	Low Earth	SDIO	Technology
