= Aeros (disambiguation) =

Aeros is a Ukrainian aircraft manufacturer building hang gliders.

Aeros may also refer to:

- Houston Aeros (WHA), a former ice hockey team that played in 1972–1978
- Houston Aeros (1994–2013), a former ice hockey team
- Akron Aeros, Minor League Baseball team
- Aeros (motorcycle), 1920's Czechoslovak motorcycle
- AEROS (satellite), US satellite for atmospheric research
- Worldwide Aeros Corporation, US projector of the Aeroscraft ML 866, hybrid airship
