= S55 =

S55 may refer to:

== Aircraft ==
- Savoia-Marchetti S.55, an Italian flying boat
- Sikorsky S-55, an American helicopter
- Sukhoi S-55, a proposed Russian fighter aircraft

== Automobiles ==
- BMW S55, an automobile engine
- Mercedes-Benz S 55 AMG, a luxury car
- Mercury S-55, an American full-size car
- Shorland S55, a British armoured personnel carrier

== Rail and transit ==
- S55 (New York City bus) serving Staten Island, United States
- S55 (ZVV), a former line of the Zurich S-Bahn in Switzerland
- S55, a former railway line in the canton of Thurgau, Switzerland, subsumed into the S5 (St. Gallen S-Bahn)
- S55, a line of Lucerne S-Bahn in Central Switzerland
- FGC line S55, a suburban train line in Catalonia, Spain

== Other uses ==
- S55 (star) in the constellation Sagittarius
- Ariel 1, a British satellite
- County Route S55 (Bergen County, New Jersey)
- Explorer S-55 (satellite), a failed American spacecraft
- INS Sindhughosh (S55), a submarine of the Indian Navy
- Siemens S55, a mobile phone
- Wandandian language
