= Explorer 46 =

NASA satellite of the Explorer program

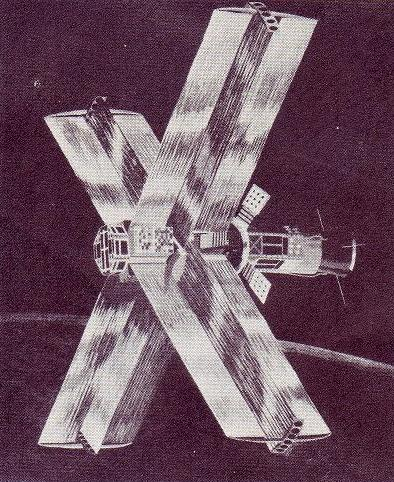
- Explorer 46 satellite
- Names: Meteoroid Technology Satellite-A; MTS-A
- Mission type: Meteroids research
- Operator: NASA
- COSPAR ID: 1972-061A
- SATCAT no.: 06142

Spacecraft properties
- Spacecraft: Explorer XLVI
- Spacecraft type: Meteoroid Technology Satellite
- Bus: MTS
- Manufacturer: Langley Research Center
- Launch mass: 90 kg (200 lb)

Start of mission
- Launch date: 13 August 1972, 15:10 UTC
- Rocket: Scout D-1 (S-184C)
- Launch site: Wallops Flight Facility, LA-3A
- Contractor: Vought
- Entered service: 13 August 1972

End of mission
- Decay date: 2 November 1979

Orbital parameters
- Reference system: Geocentric orbit
- Regime: Low Earth orbit
- Perigee altitude: 496 km (308 mi)
- Apogee altitude: 814 km (506 mi)
- Inclination: 37.70°
- Period: 97.80 minutes

Instruments
- Meteoroid Penetration; Meteoroid Penetration Sensors; Meteoroid Velocity Sensors

Explorer 46, (also Meteoroid Technology Satellite-A or MTS-A), was a NASA satellite launched as part of Explorer program.

== Mission ==
Explorer 46 was designed to provide data on the frequency and penetration energy of meteoroids and micrometeoroids in low Earth orbit. Explorer 46 consisted of a hexi-cylindrical bus covered with solar cells. Meteoroid impacts were detected and measured using bumper panels that extended after launch and gave the satellite a windmill-like appearance. The central hub of the satellite carried the velocity and impact experiments. When the bumper targets were extended from the satellite, it had an overall width of 701.50 cm (276.18 in). Twenty meteoroid impacts were recorded by the bumper panels through December 1972. A set of capacitor detectors recorded over two thousand micrometeoroid hits over the same period.

== Instruments ==
- Multi-sheet bumper, 701.50 cm (276.18 in) across, its detectors filled with gas, to register and telemeter loss of pressure;
- 12 box-shaped velocity detectors at various locations along the spacecraft;
- Impact flux detectors, with 64 detectors to assess the population of very small particles.

== Launch ==
Explorer 46 was launched on 13 August 1972, at 15:10 UTC, from Wallops Flight Facility (WFF), with a Scout D-1 Launch vehicle.

== Experiments ==
=== Meteoroid Penetration ===
The objective of this experiment was to measure the meteoroid penetration rates of a bumper-protected target. Penetrations were measured, using 12 2-mil stainless-steel pressure cells located behind 1-mil stainless-steel bumpers. These 12 cells were mounted on 4 bumper panels which extended out from the cylindrical spacecraft body. Due to a malfunction, only two of the four bumper panels deployed.

=== Meteoroid Penetration Sensors ===
This experiment measured meteoroid impacts using a thin film capacitor. Due to a spacecraft malfunction, this experiment had to be turned off two weeks after launch, but it had already recorded 2000 micrometeoroid impacts by that time. It was reactivated in August 1974.

=== Meteoroid Velocity Sensors ===
This experiment measured the velocity of impacting micrometeoroids, using two thin-film capacitors and measuring the time-of-flight between them. Due to difficulties with the spacecraft, this experiment had to be turned off two weeks after launch, but it was turned on again for 1 week in August 1974.

== Atmospheric entry ==
Explorer 46 reentered in the atmosphere on 2 November 1979.

== See also ==
- Explorer program
