= Scout X-1A =

U.S. sounding rocket, 1962

- Manufacturer: Vought
- Country of origin: United States

Size
- Height: 22 metres (72 ft)
- Diameter: 1.01 metres (3 ft 4 in)
- Mass: 17,000 kilograms (37,000 lb)
- Stages: Five

Associated rockets
- Family: Scout

Launch history
- Status: Retired
- Launch sites: Wallops LA-3
- Total launches: 1
- Success(es): 1
- Failure: 0
- UTC date of spacecraft launch: 1962-03-01

First stage – Algol 1C
- Powered by: 1 solid
- Maximum thrust: 471 kilonewtons (106,000 lb_{f})
- Specific impulse: 236 sec
- Burn time: 40 seconds
- Propellant: Solid

Second stage – Castor 1A
- Powered by: 1 solid
- Maximum thrust: 286 kilonewtons (64,000 lb_{f})
- Specific impulse: 247 sec
- Burn time: 27 seconds
- Propellant: Solid

Third stage – Antares 1A
- Powered by: 1 X-254
- Maximum thrust: 60 kilonewtons (13,000 lb_{f})
- Specific impulse: 256 sec
- Burn time: 39 seconds
- Propellant: Solid

Fourth stage – Altair 1A
- Powered by: 1 X-248A
- Maximum thrust: 14 kilonewtons (3,100 lb_{f})
- Specific impulse: 255 sec
- Burn time: 40 seconds
- Propellant: Solid

Fifth stage – NOTS-17
- Powered by: 1 solid
- Propellant: Solid

Scout X-1A was an American sounding rocket which was flown in 1962. It was a five-stage derivative of the earlier Scout X-1, with an uprated first stage, and a NOTS-17 upper stage.

The Scout X-1A used an Algol 1C first stage, instead of the earlier Algol 1B used on the Scout X-1. The second, third and fourth stages were the same as those used on the Scout X-1; a Castor 1A, Antares 1A and Altair 1A respectively. The fifth stage was the NOTS-17 solid rocket motor, which had been developed by the Naval Ordnance Test Station.

The Scout X-1A was launched on its only flight at 05:07 GMT on 1 March 1962. It flew from Launch Area 3 of the Wallops Flight Facility. The flight carried an atmospheric re-entry experiment to an apogee of 214 kilometres (133 mi), and was successful. Following this, the Scout X-1A was replaced by the Scout X-2.
