= Algol (rocket stage) =

First stage of Scout rocket family

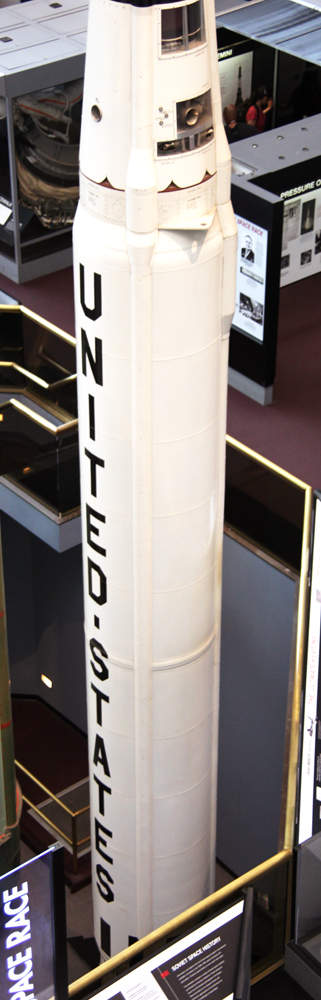
- Scout D-1 rocket that used the Algol rocket stage at the Smithsonian Air and Space Museum, 2012. Algol stage and interstage are visible
- Function: Rocket stage
- Manufacturer: Aerojet Rocketdyne

Size
- Height: 9.4 metres (31 ft)
- Mass: 1,900 kilograms (4,200 lb)

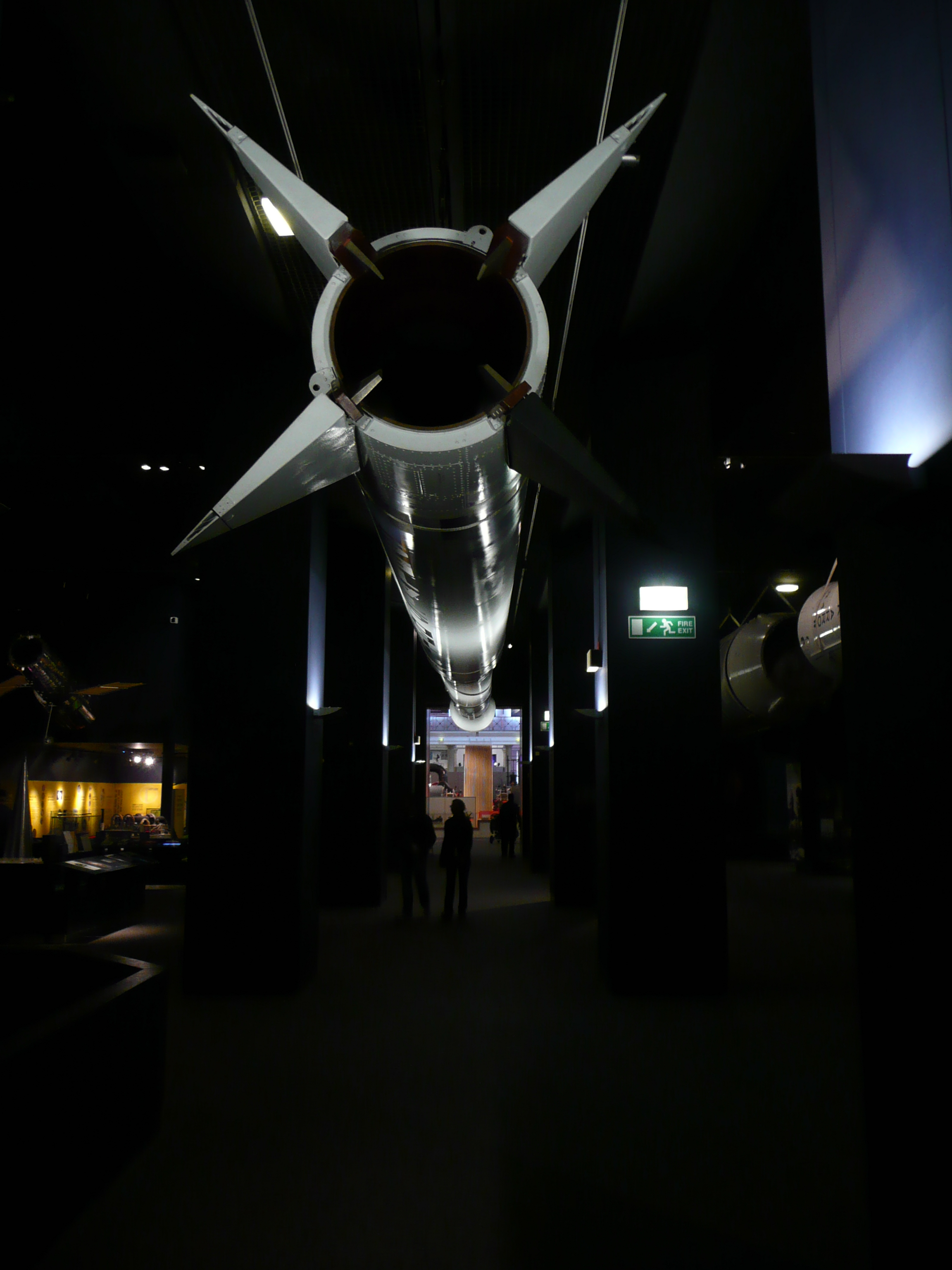
Scout rocket in the Science Museum, London. Jet vanes on the nozzle of Algol stage are visible

The Algol family of solid-fuel rocket stages and boosters is built by Aerojet (now Aerojet Rocketdyne) and used on a variety of launch vehicles. It was developed by Aerojet from the earlier Jupiter Senior and the Navy Polaris programs. Upgrades to the Algol motor occurred from 1960 until the retirement of the Scout launch vehicle in 1994.

The Algol family use solid propellant fuel with a loaded mass of 10,705 kg, and produces 470.93 kN of thrust. The motor has a specific Impulse of 236 seconds in a vacuum environment. Variations Algol I, I-D, II, II-A, II-BA popular rating was 40KS-115,000 (52,000 kgf for 40 seconds), also known as Senior.

They were initially developed as the first-stage of propulsion for the Scout rocket, with the design being based on the UGM-27 Polaris, a submarine-launched ballistic missile developed for the United States Navy at the Jet Propulsion Laboratory.

== Algol 1 (XM-68) ==
=== Algol 1 (XM-68) ===
This rocket design started as the Polaris test motor, 31 feet in length with a 40 inches (1.0 m) diameter steel case, and 86,000 lbf of thrust. The eventual UGM-27 Polaris A-1 was larger, 28.5 feet (8.7 m) in length and 54 inches (1.4 m) in diameter.

The Algol 1 was first used for a successful suborbital launch of a Scout X-1 rocket on September 2, 1960. The rocket started as a UGM-27 Polaris test motor with a 40-inch diameter, the largest solid motor ever tested at the time. It had a nominal performance rating of 40 seconds duration and 45,000 kgf thrust. It was 19.42 feet (5.92 m) long, 2.6 feet (0.79 m) in diameter. Later versions for Scout D scaled to 1.14 m (45 in) in diameter.

==== Specifications ====
These are the basic specifications for the Algol 1 engine:

- Gross mass: 10,705 kg (23,600 lb)
- Unfuelled mass: 1,900 kg (4,100 lb)
- Height: 9.12 m (29.92 ft)
- Diameter: 1.01 m (3.31 ft)
- Thrust: 470.90 kN (105,863 lbf)
- Specific impulse: 236 s
- Specific impulse sea level: 214 s
- Burn time: 40 s

=== Algol 1-A ===
Used on the Scout X (Cub Scout) test flight flown April 18, 1960. served as prototype vehicle for eventual Scout rocket.

=== Algol 1-B ===
Used on Scout X-1, RM-89 Blue Scout I, and RM-90 Blue Scout II.

=== Algol 1-C ===
Used on the Scout X-1A. After this single flight, the Scout X-2 with Algol 1-D replaced this prototype.

=== Algol 1-D ===
It was first used on the Scout X-2 on March 29, 1962. It continued to be used on Scout X-2 and Scout X-2M launches until 1963. The same year, it was also used on the Little Joe II Qualification Test Vehicle.

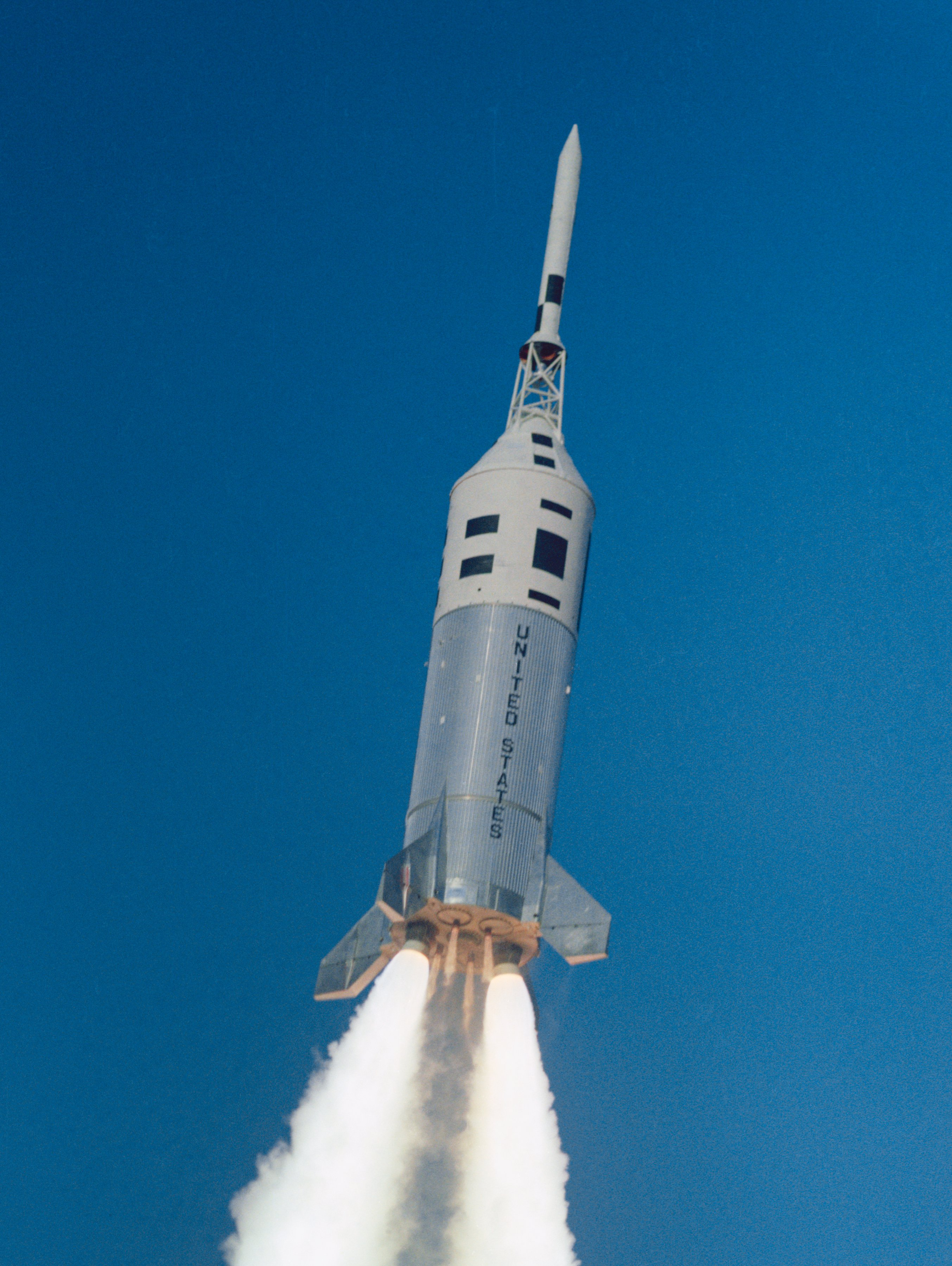
Little Joe II, A-002, December 8, 1964, flight

==== Specifications ====
These are the basic specifications for the Algol 1-D engine:

- Gross mass: 10,700 kg (23,600 lb)
- Unfuelled mass: 1,200 kg (2,600 lb)
- Height: 9.40 m (30.8 ft)
- Diameter: 1.02 m (3.3 ft)
- Thrust: 440.00 kN (98,910 lbf)
- Burn time: 44 s

== Algol II ==
Diagram showing the use of an Algol 2 as the first stage of a Scout-B vehicle

The Algol 2 (Algol II) series was first flown in 1962. It was used a first stage on Scout A, Scout B, Scout X-3 and Scout X-4.

Algol II was proposed as a strap-on motor for the 3BAS2 configuration of Titan 3B rocket proposed by Martin in the mid-1960s. It would have been used for deep space missions with a Centaur upper stage and strap-on for liftoff thrust augmentation. It was never flown. It was also proposed for the Athena RTX program in 1969, losing to Thiokol.

=== Algol II-A ===
The Algol II-A was introduced in 1963 using the Aerojet 40 KS motor. It first flew on Scout X-3 in 1963.

=== Algol II-B ===
The Algol II-B was created after an Algol II-A flight failure, the nozzle was designed and designate the II-B model. It first flew on Scout X-4.

==== Specifications ====
These are the basic specifications for the Algol II-B engine:

- Gross mass: 10,700 kg (23,500 lb)
- Unfuelled mass: 1,170 kg (2,570 lb)
- Height: 9.10 m (29.80 ft)
- Diameter: 1.02 m (3.34 ft)
- Thrust: 400.00 kN (89,920 lbf)
- Burn time: 80 s

=== Algol II-C ===
The Algol II-C flew on Scout A-1 and B-1. Scout A-2, B-2, C and 2 versions planned for Algol II-C were never used.

==== Specifications ====
These are the basic specifications for the Algol II-C engine:

- Gross mass: 10,800 kg (23,800 lb)
- Unfuelled mass: 1,200 kg (2,600 lb
- Height: 9.10 m (29.80 ft)
- Diameter: 1.02 m (3.34 ft)
- Thrust: 436.00 kN (98,016 lbf)
- Burn time: 76 s

== See also ==
- UGM-27 Polaris
- Graphite-Epoxy Motor
- Little Joe
- Scout (rocket family)
- Vega (rocket)
