= Scout X-2 =

U.S. sounding and orbital rocket, 1962

- Manufacturer: Vought
- Country of origin: United States

Size
- Height: 25 metres (82 ft)
- Diameter: 1.01 metres (3 ft 4 in)
- Mass: 16,440 kilograms (36,240 lb)
- Stages: Four

Capacity

Payload to LEO
- Mass: 76 kilograms (168 lb)

Associated rockets
- Family: Scout

Launch history
- Status: Retired
- Launch sites: Wallops LA-3; Point Arguello LC-D
- Total launches: 2
- Success(es): 1
- Failure(s): 1
- First flight: 1962-03-29
- Last flight: 1962-04-26

First stage – Algol 1D
- Powered by: 1 solid
- Maximum thrust: 440 kilonewtons (99,000 lb_{f})
- Burn time: 44 seconds
- Propellant: Solid

Second stage – Castor 1A
- Powered by: 1 solid
- Maximum thrust: 286 kilonewtons (64,000 lb_{f})
- Specific impulse: 247 sec
- Burn time: 27 seconds
- Propellant: Solid

Third stage – Antares 2A
- Powered by: 1 X-254
- Maximum thrust: 93 kilonewtons (21,000 lb_{f})
- Specific impulse: 293 sec
- Burn time: 36 seconds
- Propellant: Solid

Fourth stage – Altair 1A
- Powered by: 1 X-248A
- Maximum thrust: 14 kilonewtons (3,100 lb_{f})
- Specific impulse: 255 sec
- Burn time: 40 seconds
- Propellant: Solid

Scout X-2 was an American expendable launch system and sounding rocket which was flown twice in 1962. It was a four-stage rocket, based on the earlier Scout X-1, uprated first and third stages. It was a member of the Scout family of rockets.

The Scout X-2 used an Algol 1D first stage, instead of the earlier Algol 1B used on the Scout X-1. The third stage was the Antares 2A, a more powerful version of the Antares 1A used on earlier variants of the Scout rocket. The second and fourth stages were the same as those used on the Scout X-1; a Castor 1A and an Altair 1A respectively.

The first Scout X-2 was launched on a suborbital flight at 07:27 GMT on 29 March 1962. It flew from Launch Area 3 of the Wallops Flight Facility. The flight carried plasma and aeronomy experiments to an apogee of 6,291 kilometres (3,909 mi), and was successful. The second flight, launched on 26 April, carried the Solrad 4B satellite. It failed to reach orbit. Following this launch, the Scout X-2 was replaced by the upgraded Scout X-2M.
