= Scout X =

American rocket

- Function: Test vehicle
- Manufacturer: Vought
- Country of origin: United States

Size
- Height: 21.6 metres (71 ft)
- Diameter: 1.02 metres (3 ft 4 in)
- Mass: 16,700 kilograms (36,800 lb)
- Stages: Two

Associated rockets
- Family: Scout
- Derivative work: Scout X-1

Launch history
- Status: Retired
- Launch sites: Wallops LA-3
- Total launches: 1
- Failure: 1
- UTC date of spacecraft launch: 1960-04-18

First stage – Algol 1A
- Powered by: 1 solid
- Maximum thrust: 471 kilonewtons (106,000 lb_{f})
- Specific impulse: 236 sec
- Burn time: 40 seconds
- Propellant: Solid

Second stage – Antares 1A
- Powered by: 1 X-254
- Maximum thrust: 60 kilonewtons (13,000 lb_{f})
- Specific impulse: 256 sec
- Burn time: 39 seconds
- Propellant: Solid

Scout X, also known as Cub Scout, was an American rocket which served as a prototype of the Scout, which was launched on a single test flight in 1960. It was used to test the configuration that later Scout rockets would use as well as two of the solid rocket motors that would be used on them.

The Scout X had the same configuration as the Scout X-1, which would be the first all-up version of the Scout. Unlike the X-1, which had four live stages, the Scout X only had live first and third stages, with battleship mockups of the second and fourth.

It was launched from Launch Area 3 at the Wallops Flight Facility at 23:09 GMT on 18 April 1960. The launch failed when the rocket disintegrated during stage separation.
