= Explorer S-55 (satellite) =

NASA satellite of the Explorer program

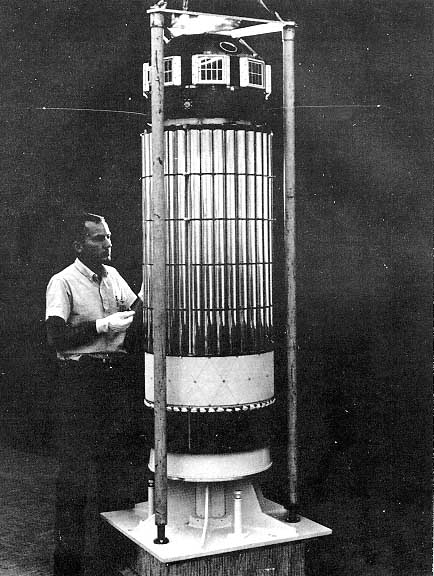
- Explorer S-55 satellite
- Names: Explorer S-55; NASA S-55
- Mission type: Micrometeoroid research
- Operator: NASA
- Mission duration: Failed to orbit

Spacecraft properties
- Spacecraft: Explorer S-55
- Spacecraft type: Science Explorer
- Bus: S-55
- Manufacturer: Goddard Space Flight Center
- Launch mass: 86 kg (190 lb)
- Dimensions: 1.93 × 0.61 m (6 ft 4 in × 2 ft 0 in) cylinder
- Power: Solar cells and nickel-cadmium batteries

Start of mission
- Launch date: 30 June 1961, 17:09 GMT
- Rocket: Scout X-1 (ST-5)
- Launch site: Wallops Flight Facility, LA-3
- Contractor: Vought

End of mission
- Destroyed: Failed to orbit

Orbital parameters
- Reference system: Geocentric orbit (planned)
- Regime: Low Earth orbit

Instruments
Instruments
- Cadmium Sulfide Cell Micrometeorite Detector
- Copper Wire Micrometeroite Detector
- Pressurized Cell Micrometeorite Detector
- Impact Detection
- Grid Detectors

Explorer S-55 was an American satellite launched by NASA on 30 June 1961, as part of the Explorer program. Explorer S-55, was launched using a Scout X-1 launch vehicle from the Wallops Flight Facility (WFF). Its mission was to evaluate the launch vehicle and investigate micrometeoroid impact and penetration. The mission failed because the third stage failed to ignite and the spacecraft did not achieve orbit.

== Mission ==
The objectives of the flight were to test vehicle performance and guidance and to investigate the nature and effects of micrometeoroids on the spacecraft systems. The scientific instrumentation consisted of cadmium sulfide-cell, wire-grid, piezoelectric, pressurized-cell and foil-type micrometeoroid detectors.

== Spacecraft ==
The spacecraft was a 1.93 m × 0.61 m (6 ft 4 in × 2 ft 0 in) cylinder. Weighing 86 kg (190 lb), including its fourth stage and transition section, its objective was to test the performance of a Scout launch vehicle and its guidance system and to investigate the nature and effects of space flight on micrometeoroids. Its payload was a 1.93 × 0.61 m (6 ft 4 in × 2 ft 0 in) cylinder, almost covered by five types of micometeoroid impact detectors, two transmitters, solar cells and nickel-cadmium batteries.

== Launch ==
Explorer S-55 was launched on 30 June 1961, at 17:09 GMT, in using a Scout X-1 launch vehicle. The mission failed because the third stage failed to ignite and the spacecraft did not achieve orbit.

== See also ==
Explorer 13
