= Orbiting Frog Otolith =

NASA space program which sent frogs into orbit

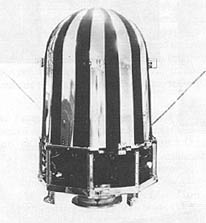
- The Orbiting Frog Otolith (OFO) spacecraft
- Mission type: Bioscience
- Operator: NASA
- COSPAR ID: 1970-094A
- SATCAT no.: 04690
- Mission duration: 6 days

Spacecraft properties
- Manufacturer: Ames Research Center
- Launch mass: 132.9 kilograms (293 lb)
- Dimensions: 1.68 × 0.76 m (5.5 × 2.5 ft)

Start of mission
- Launch date: 9 November 1970, 06:00:00 UTC
- Rocket: Scout B S174C
- Launch site: Wallops LA-3A

End of mission
- Landing date: 9 May 1971

Orbital parameters
- Reference system: Geocentric
- Regime: Low Earth
- Eccentricity: 0.02009
- Perigee altitude: 300 kilometres (190 mi)
- Apogee altitude: 574 kilometres (357 mi)
- Inclination: 37.3981º
- Period: 93.3 minutes
- RAAN: 223.1857º
- Argument of perigee: 136.8142º
- Mean anomaly: 226.2623º
- Mean motion: 16.50400352
- Epoch: 9 May 1971
- Revolution no.: 2843

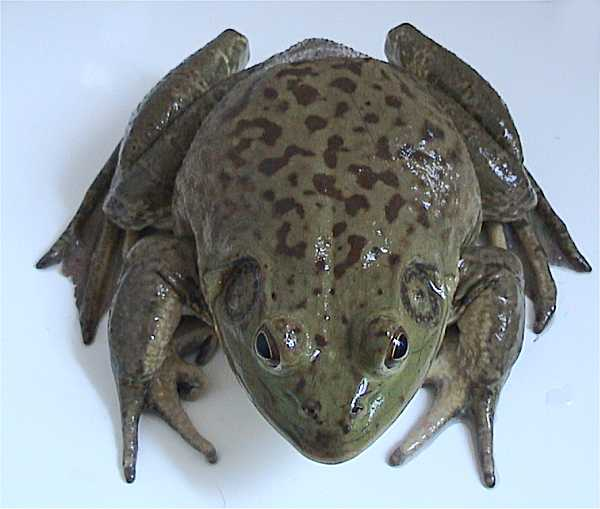
An American Bullfrog (Lithobates catesbeianus), the species which travelled on the OFO-A flight

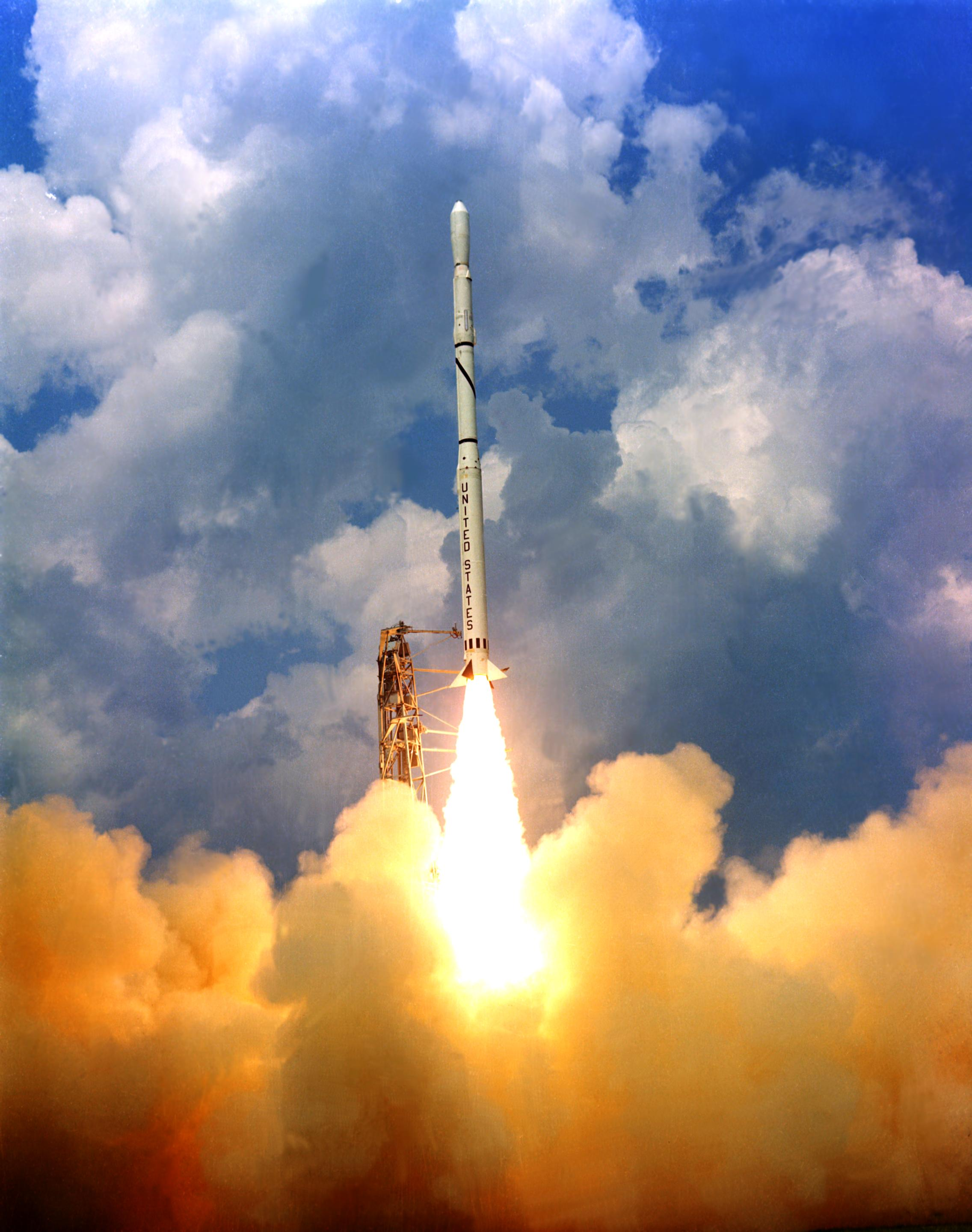
A Scout B rocket, like this one, launched the OFO.

The Orbiting Frog Otolith (OFO) was a NASA space program which sent two bullfrogs into orbit on November 9, 1970, for the study of weightlessness. The name, derived through common use, was a functional description of the biological experiment carried by the satellite. Otolith referred to the frog's inner ear balance mechanism.

The Orbiting Frog Otolith Program was a part of the research program of NASA's Office of Advanced Research and Technology (OART). One of the goals of the OART was to study the vestibular system function in space and on Earth. The experiment was designed to study the adaptability of the otolith to sustained weightlessness, to provide information for human spaceflight. The otolith is a structure in the inner ear that is associated with equilibrium control: acceleration with respect to gravity as its primary sensory input.

The Frog Otolith Experiment (FOE) was developed by Torquato Gualtierotti of the University of Milan, Italy, when he was assigned to the Ames Research Center as a resident Research Associate sponsored by the National Academy of Sciences. Originally planned in 1966 to be included on an early Apollo mission, the experiment was deferred when that mission was canceled. In late 1967 authorization was given to orbit the FOE when a supporting spacecraft could be designed. The project, part of NASA's Human Factor Systems program, was officially designated "OFO" in 1968. After a series of delays, OFO was launched into orbit on November 9, 1970.

After the successful OFO-A mission in 1970, interest in the research continued. A project called Vestibular Function Research was initiated in 1975 to fly a vestibular experiment in an Earth-orbiting spacecraft. This flight project was eventually discontinued, but a number of ground studies were conducted. The research has given rise to several very useful offshoots, including the ground-based Vestibular Research Facility located at ARC.

OFO should not be confused with similar acronyms describing the Orbiting Observatory series of spacecraft, such as Orbiting Geophysical Observatory (OGO), Orbiting Solar Observatory (OSO), and Orbiting Astronomical Observatory (OAO).

== The OFO spacecraft ==
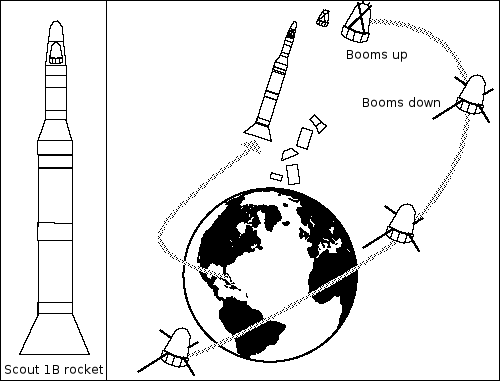
Launch of the Orbiting Frog Otolith (OFO) capsule

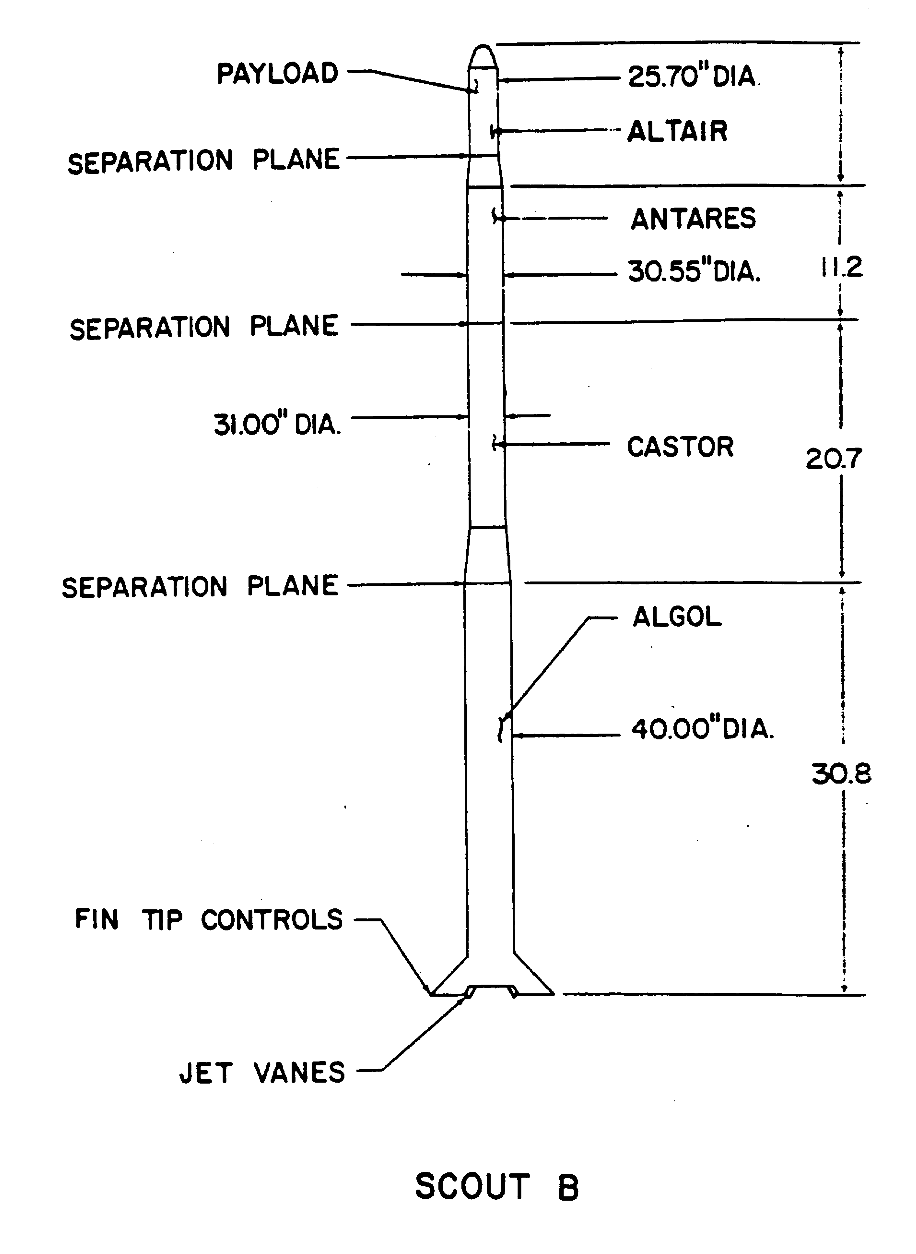
Diagram of Scout B launch vehicle

The OFO experiment was originally designed for flight within the Apollo Applications Program, which was established to make optimum use of hardware used in Apollo lunar missions. However, because the low acceleration levels needed for the experiment could not easily be maintained in a crewed Apollo spacecraft, an uncrewed satellite was later chosen as a more suitable vehicle. The satellite's design eliminated exposures to acceleration levels above 10^{−3}g (10 mm/s²). This meant that the experimental specimens could experience an almost weightless state.

The spacecraft had a diameter of approximately 30 in (760 mm) and a length of 47 in (1,200 mm). The octagonal lower section of the spacecraft housed the electronic apparatus. The upper section, which contained the experiment package, was shaped like a truncated cone. A heat shield covering this upper section protected the experiment during re-entry into the Earth's atmosphere. A yo-yo de-spin assembly was located around the girth of the spacecraft. Four booms, folded against the side of the spacecraft, were located radially around the satellite. After the spacecraft separated from the launch vehicle, the yo-yo despin subsystem slowed spacecraft rotation. The four booms were then released to extend from the side of the spacecraft. The extension of the booms increased the moment of inertia of the spacecraft, permitting the acceleration level to remain below 10^{−3}g.

== Orbiting Frog Otolith-A ==
Mission
OFO-A
Mission duration
6 days
Date
November 9–15, 1970 (not recovered)
Life Sciences Research Objectives
To study the effect of microgravity on the vestibular organ
Life Sciences Investigations
Neuroscience ( OFO-1.1, 1.2, 1.3)
Organisms studied
Lithobates catesbeianus (American Bullfrog)
Flight hardware
Frog Otolith Experiment Package (FOEP)
FOEP Life Support System (LSS)
Launch vehicle
Scout B
LV configuration
Scout B S178C

The OFO-A mission was launched on November 9, 1970 (06:00 GMT) from Wallops Island launch site. The satellite carrying the OFO-A experiment remained in orbit for almost seven days. Recovery of the spacecraft was not planned. The payload was the Frog Otolith Experiment Package (FOEP).

The objective of the experiment was to investigate the effect of microgravity on the otolith, a sensory organ that responds to changes in an animal's orientation within the Earth's gravitational field.

Two American bullfrogs (Lithobates catesbeianus) were used as experimental subjects in the flight experiment. The bullfrog was chosen for study because its inner ear labyrinth is very similar to that of humans. Since it is an amphibian, preflight surgery could be performed above water, but it could be kept in water during the flight. The water medium served to cushion the vibration and acceleration of launch, and to facilitate gas exchange with the organisms.

The frogs were sourced from the Louisiana Frog Company in Rayne, Louisiana. The town was the nation's top exporter of frogs through the early and mid-20th century and already known as the "Frog Capital of the World." Local Congressman (and future four-term governor) Edwin Edwards helped connect the agency with Rayne, six miles east of his hometown of Crowley. A total of 20 Rayne frogs were sent to NASA for evaluation, where they were narrowed to a group of four—two of which would go into orbit and two who would remain as a backup crew. The two space-bound specimens were named Pierre and Tee-Nom ("Little Name," roughly, in Louisiana French).

Both flight frogs had electrocardiogram (ECG) electrodes implanted in their thoracic cavities and microelectrodes implanted in their vestibular nerves. The frogs were demotorized by cutting their limb nerves to prevent them from dislodging their implanted electrodes, and to reduce their metabolic rates. With this lowered metabolic activity, the frogs could survive without being fed for as long as one month. Immersion in water allowed the frogs to breathe through their skin. The water medium also helped to move carbon dioxide and heat away from the animals.

=== Hardware ===
The flight hardware unit, the FOEP, was a pressure-tight canister containing a water-filled centrifuge that housed the two frogs. The centrifuge was a cylindrical structure that rotated the frogs' heads at scheduled intervals. The FOEP also contained a life support system which could maintain a regulated environment for the frogs. This system consisted of two closed loops, one containing liquid and the other containing gas. The interface between the two loops was a selectively permeable silicone rubber that acted as an artificial lung. Oxygen passed through the membrane from the gas to the liquid side, and carbon dioxide from the liquid to the gas side. The frogs were immersed in the liquid loop. A pump circulated oxygen through the gas-containing loop. Carbon dioxide entering the gas loop was removed by an absorbent and the purified oxygen returned to the pump for recirculation. A water evaporator and an electric heater maintained the water temperature at about 60 °F (16 °C). An amplifier system in the FOEP increased voltage output from the microelectrodes implanted in the animals to the level required by the telemetry apparatus.

=== Operations ===
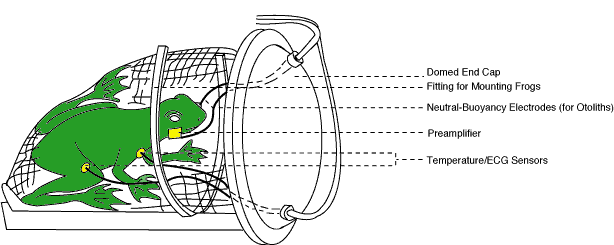
A drawing of how a bullfrog fitted with electrodes was to sit inside the centrifuge of the Frog Otolith Experiment Package

Surgical preparation of the flight frogs was completed about 12 hours before launch, and the animals were sealed inside the FOEP. A backup FOEP was also prepared with similar specimens. The flight FOEP was installed in the satellite about three hours before launch.

The centrifuge was activated as soon as possible once the satellite was in orbit and stabilized at 10^{−3}g (10 mm/s²). The centrifuge applied gravity stimuli in cycles. Each cycle lasted about 8 minutes, and consisted of the following: a 1-minute period without acceleration, an 8-second period when rotation slowly began, 14 seconds of constant 0.6 g (6 m/s²), an 8-second period when rotation slowly stopped, and a 6-minute period when aftereffects of rotation could be measured. Cycles were performed every 30 minutes during the initial 3 hours in orbit, and less frequently during the rest of the flight.

The OFO experiment continued until the seventh day in orbit, at which time the onboard battery failed. Recovery of the OFO spacecraft and FOEP hardware were not required. The two frogs died as part of the experiment.

=== Results ===
The experiment was successful. Electrocardiography (ECG) indices showed the flight frogs to be in good health during the entire flight. Vestibular recordings were made as expected. Two equipment malfunctions occurred during the flight: pressure in the canister increased to 11 pounds per square inch (76 kPa), and the temperature decreased to 55 °F (13 °C) for nine hours. However, control experiments performed on the ground showed that these malfunctions had little effect on the outcome of the flight experiment.

Several vestibular response changes were noted during the early period in weightlessness. All of the observed changes reverted to normal during the last 10 to 20 hours of the flight, suggesting acclimatization.

NASA reported that the frogs died shortly before noon, Washington time, on November 15 after more than six days in orbit.

== Frog Otolith Experiment Package (FOEP) ==
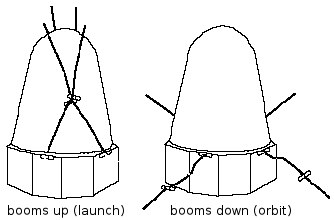
Orbiting Frog Otolith (OFO) with booms. Booms out increased the moment of inertia.

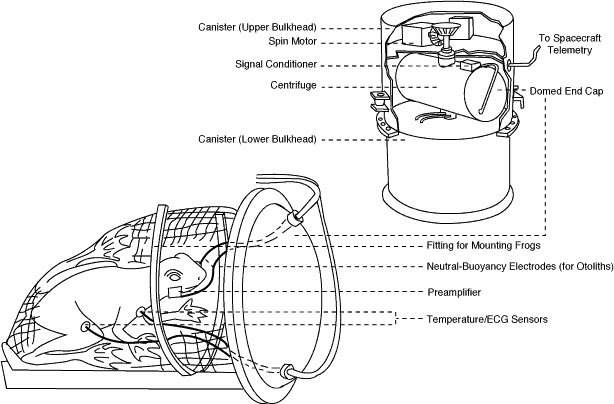
Frog Otolith Experiment Package

The Frog Otolith Experiment Package (FOEP) contains all the apparatus necessary to ensure the survival of two frogs. Specimens are housed in a water-filled, self-contained centrifuge which supplies the test acceleration during orbit. Frogs are demotorized to prevent dislodging of implanted electrodes and to reduce their metabolic rate.

Life Support System (LSS): The LSS maintains a regulated environment within the FOEP to assure the survival and normal functioning of two demotorized frogs. The lower bulkhead of the inner assembly structure provides mounting space for all life support equipment.

The package's dimensions were 18 in (457 mm) diameter × 18 in length, weighed 91 lb (41 kg) when loaded. Data acquisition consisted of ECG, body temperature, and vestibular activity. There was also a ground-based FOEP test unit which the FOEP could be connected preflight for ventilation and verification of environmental conditions prior to loading in the spacecraft.

=== Canister ===
The outer housing of the FOEP is a pressure-tight canister 18 1/16 inches (459 mm) in diameter and 18 1/2 inches (470 mm) long. The bottom closure and removable top lid are both slightly domed to prevent implosion should pressure reversals be encountered. The inner assembly structure is fastened to a support ring approximately 6 inches from the bottom of the canister and consists of upper and lower bulkheads joined by a cylinder. Cutouts in the cylinder permit access to the centrifuge, which houses the frogs. Near the top of the canister are two electrical feed-through receptacles for the power supply and data line.

=== Centrifuge ===
The centrifuge is a hollow cylinder 6 inches in diameter and 13.5 inches long with both end caps in place. The cylinder is mounted perpendicular to the canister and supported by ball bearings housed in the upper and lower bulkheads. The rotational axis of the centrifuge is formed by shafts centrally located in the vertical plane at right angles to the cylinder, held in place by the ball bearings. Thin, shallow-domed end caps are bolted to each end of the centrifuge with intervening rubber gaskets to prevent leakage. In the center of each cap is a fitting which allows frog specimens to be fully instrumented and mounted directly to the end caps before insertion into the centrifuge, and immersion. The water serves as a cushion for the high accelerations and vibrations of launch and as a medium for gas exchange via the frogs' skin. The centrifuge is locked in position and not released until after the spacecraft orbit is fully stabilized. The motor which drives the centrifuge is mounted to the upper bulkhead. Signal amplifiers and an accelerometer are mounted on the centrifuge.

=== Neutral-buoyancy electrode ===
The micro-electrode consists of a probe of tungsten wire 50 μm in diameter, sharpened electrically to a point less than 1 μm in diameter and completely insulated to the tip. A bubble of air trapped in the polyethylene tubing which contains the probe adds buoyancy and makes the electrode the same density as the nerve in which it is implanted, thereby allowing the two to move together. A section of paraffin is used to connect the electrode to a handle which is used only during the implantation process, then removed. Nerve impulses detected by the microelectrodes are fed into a preamplifier directly attached to the frog's jaw, and passed on to a post-data amplifier for spacecraft telemetry.

== Life support system (LSS) ==
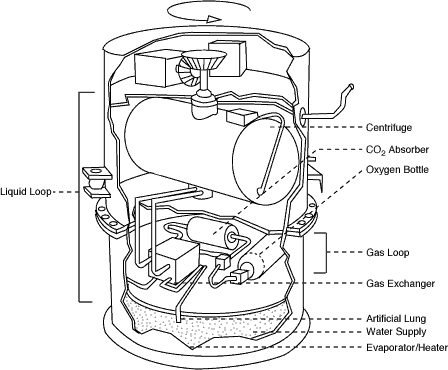
Life Support System (LSS)

The life support system (LSS) of the Frog Otolith Experiment Package (FOEP) maintains a regulated environment within the FOEP to assure the survival and normal functioning of the experimental specimens. The LSS is designed to meet the physiological requirements of two demotorized frogs weighing 350 g (12 oz) each. Frogs are demotorized by cutting the limb nerves, which reduces their metabolic rate. In this condition, the frogs require no artificial respiration and can remain healthy without being fed, for as long as a month. After being installed in the centrifuge the frogs are completely immersed in water, which serves as the medium for exchange of oxygen and carbon dioxide and heat through the frog's skin.

The LSS primarily consists of two closed loops: one containing liquid and the other containing gas. The lower bulkhead of the inner assembly structure provides mounting space for all LSS equipment. The oxygen supply system operates through these loops and includes a 4.5 cm^{3} capacity oxygen bottle, a pressure reducer and regulator, an artificial lung, CO_{2} absorber, and water supply. Limited control over the temperature of the frogs' environment is available by means of a water evaporator/heater.

=== Artificial lung ===
The interface between loops occurs at a selectively permeable membrane of silicon rubber which separates the liquid and gas. This membrane, called the lung, passes oxygen from the gas loop to the liquid loop, and CO_{2} from the liquid loop to the gas loop.

=== Liquid loop ===
The frogs, housed in the centrifuge, are in the liquid loop. Moving from the lung to the frogs, the loop contains water and dissolved oxygen; moving from the frogs back to the lung, it contains water and free CO_{2}. A double layer of polyurethane foam lining the interior of the centrifuge prevents frog waste matter from fouling the water circulation system. Water is circulated through the liquid loop using a small pump and must pass through the filter before leaving the centrifuge.

=== Gas loop ===
The gas loop consists of a circuit in the lower bulkhead through which oxygen is circulated by a small pump. The pump delivers pure oxygen to the lung where some of it passes into the liquid loop, while the remainder becomes mixed with the CO_{2} coming from the liquid loop. From the lung, the oxygen-CO_{2} mixture is passed through a bed of Baralyme which absorbs the CO_{2}. Pure oxygen is returned from the Baralyme to the pump and recirculated. The oxygen supply is replenished by gas from the small oxygen tank.

=== Evaporator/heater ===
Augmented by the thermal environment of the spacecraft, the water evaporator and 8 Watt electric heater will maintain water temperature at 60±5 °F (15.5±3 °C). The water supply for the evaporator is contained in a rubber bladder supported by a ring in the canister immediately above the lower dome. When water temperature exceeds the nominal 60 °F, a ground command actuates a timing circuit operating a valve. As a result of the ambient pressure inside the canister, water is forced from the bladder through the valve and into the evaporator. Internal heat loads are transferred through a heat exchanger to the evaporator and are dissipated in evaporating the water.

== See also ==
- Animals in space
