= RM-90 Blue Scout II =

U.S. sounding rocket, 1961

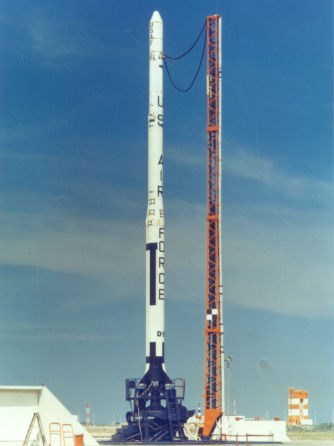
- Blue Scout II rocket
- Function: Expendable launch system Sounding rocket
- Manufacturer: Vought
- Country of origin: United States

Size
- Height: 24 metres (79 ft)
- Diameter: 1.02 metres (3 ft 4 in)
- Mass: 16,874 kilograms (37,201 lb)
- Stages: Four

Capacity

Payload to LEO
- Mass: 30 kilograms (66 lb)

Associated rockets
- Family: Scout

Launch history
- Status: Retired
- Launch sites: Canaveral LC-18B
- Total launches: 3
- Success(es): 2
- Failure(s): 1
- First flight: 1961-03-03
- Last flight: 1961-11-01

First stage – Algol 1B
- Powered by: 1 solid
- Maximum thrust: 471 kilonewtons (106,000 lb_{f})
- Specific impulse: 236 sec
- Burn time: 40 seconds
- Propellant: Solid

Second stage – Castor 2
- Powered by: 1 TX-354-3
- Maximum thrust: 286 kilonewtons (64,000 lb_{f})
- Specific impulse: 247 sec
- Burn time: 27 seconds
- Propellant: Solid

Third stage – Antares 1A
- Powered by: 1 X-254
- Maximum thrust: 60 kilonewtons (13,000 lb_{f})
- Specific impulse: 256 sec
- Burn time: 39 seconds
- Propellant: Solid

Fourth stage – Altair 1A
- Powered by: 1 X-248A
- Maximum thrust: 14 kilonewtons (3,100 lb_{f})
- Specific impulse: 255 sec
- Burn time: 40 seconds
- Propellant: Solid

The RM-90 Blue Scout II was an American sounding rocket and expendable launch system which was flown three times during 1961. It was a member of the Scout family of rockets. Blue Scout II was a military version of the NASA-operated Scout X-1, with adjustments to the payload fairings, engine nozzles and fins.

Blue Scout II had a total length of 21.65 m and a finspan of 2.84 m.

It was capable of sending a 30 kg payload to a 300 km orbit at 28.00 degrees. It was a four stage vehicle, with the following engines:

- Stage 1: Algol 1B, solid propellant;
- Stage 2: Castor 2 (TX-354-3), solid propellant;
- Stage 3: Antares 1A (Star 31/X-254), solid propellant;
- Stage 4: Altair 1A (X-248), solid propellant.

Blue Scout II was used for two HETS test flights, and the launch of the Mercury-Scout 1 satellite for NASA. This rocket and RM-89 Blue Scout I were replaced by Blue Scout Junior.

== Blue Scout II parameters ==
Parameter	1st Stage	2nd Stage	3rd Stage	4th Stage
Gross Mass	10,705 kg	4,424 kg	1,225 kg	238 kg
Empty Mass	1,900 kg	695 kg	294 kg	30 kg
Thrust	470 kN	259 kN	60.5 kN	12.4 kN
Isp	214 s (2.10 kNs/kg)	262 s (2.57 kNs/kg)	256 s (2.51 kNs/kg)	256 s (2.51 kNs/kg)
Burn time	40 s	37 s	39 s	38 s
Length	9.12 m	6.04 m	3.38 m	1.83 m
Diameter	1.01 m	0.79 m	0.78 m	0.46 m
Engine:	Aerojet General Algol 1	Thiokol XM33 (TX-354-3) Castor 2	Allegany Ballistics Lab X-254 Antares 1A	Allegany Ballistics Lab X-248 Altair 1
Propellant	Solid	Solid	Solid	Solid

== Launches ==
All three Blue Scout II launches occurred from Launch Complex 18B at the Cape Canaveral Air Force Station, the same launch pad used for the Blue Scout I.

The first two launches were successfully conducted on 3 March and 12 April 1961 respectively, using vehicles D-4 and D-5. They both carried HETS A2 plasma research experiments on suborbital trajectories.

The third launch was conducted on 1 November, using vehicle D-8, with the Mercury-Scout 1 satellite for NASA, which was intended to reach low Earth orbit. The launch failed after the rocket went out of control, and was destroyed by the range safety officer 43 seconds after liftoff.

Date	Serial	Agency	Orbit	Mission Description
1961 March 3	D-4	USAF	Suborbital, 2540 km apogee	HETS A2-1 plasma mission
1961 April 12	D-5	USAF	Suborbital, 1931 km apogee	HETS A2-2 plasma mission
1961 November 1	D-8	USAF	373 km × 643 km, 32.5° (planned)	Mercury-Scout 1 (failure)
