= Nike-Iroquois =

Designation of a two-stage American sounding rocket

Nike Iroquois is the designation of a two-stage American sounding rocket. The Nike Iroquois was launched 213 times between 1964 and 1978. The maximum flight height of the Nike Iroquois amounts to 290 km (950,000 ft), the takeoff thrust 48,800 lbf (217 kN), the takeoff weight 700 kg and the length 8.00 m.
