= Explorer 13 =

NASA satellite of the Explorer program

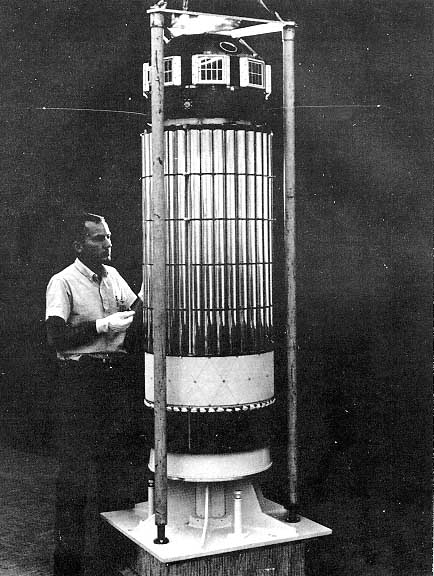
- Explorer 13 satellite
- Names: S-55A
- Mission type: Micrometeoroid research
- Operator: NASA
- Harvard designation: 1961 Chi 1
- COSPAR ID: 1961-022A
- SATCAT no.: 00180
- Mission duration: 2.5 days (achieved)

Spacecraft properties
- Spacecraft: Explorer XIII
- Spacecraft type: Science Explorer
- Bus: S-55
- Manufacturer: Goddard Space Flight Center
- Launch mass: 86 kg (190 lb)
- Dimensions: 61 × 1.92 cm (24.02 × 0.76 in) cylinder
- Power: Solar cells and nickel-cadmium batteries

Start of mission
- Launch date: 25 August 1961, 18:29:44 GMT
- Rocket: Scout X-1 (ST-6)
- Launch site: Wallops Flight Facility, LA-3
- Contractor: Vought
- Entered service: 25 August 1961

End of mission
- Last contact: 28 August 1961
- Decay date: 28 August 1961

Orbital parameters
- Reference system: Geocentric orbit
- Regime: Low Earth orbit
- Perigee altitude: 125 km (78 mi)
- Apogee altitude: 1,164 km (723 mi)
- Inclination: 37.7°
- Period: 97.5 minutes

Instruments
Instruments
- Cadmium Sulfide Cell Micrometeorite Detector
- Copper Wire Micrometeroite Detector
- Grid Detectors
- Impact Detection
- Pressurized Cell Micrometeorite Detector

Explorer 13, (also called S-55A), was a NASA satellite launched as part of the Explorer program on 25 August 1961, at 18:29:44 GMT, from Wallops Flight Facility (WFF), Virginia.

== Mission ==
The objectives of the flight were to test vehicle performance and guidance and to investigate the nature and effects of micrometeoroids on the spacecraft systems. The scientific instrumentation consisted of cadmium sulfide-cell, wire-grid, piezoelectric, pressurized-cell, and foil-type micrometeoroid detectors.

== Spacecraft ==
The spacecraft was a 61 × 192 cm (24 × 76 in) cylinder. Weighing 86 kg (190 lb), including its fourth stage and transition section, its objective was to test the performance of a Scout launch vehicle and its guidance system and to investigate the nature and effects of space flight on micrometeoroids. Its payload was a 61 × 192 cm (24 × 76 in) cylinder, almost covered by five types of micometeoroid impact detectors, two transmitters, solar cells and nickel-cadmium batteries.

== Instruments ==
=== Cadmium Sulfide Cell Micrometeorite Detector ===
Two cadmium sulfide (CdS) cell detectors mounted 180° apart on the fore-end of the spacecraft shell were used to detect micrometeoroid particles too fine to damage heavy metallic hardware, but presumably present in sufficient numbers to damage sensitive surfaces. Each cell sensor consisted of a mirrorized ellipsoidal flask with two optical foci. A sheet of aluminized mylar film was stretched across one of the focal planes, while the cadmium-sulfide cell was mounted in the other. The total effective area exposed to penetration was 20.0-cm^{2}. When a micrometeoroid penetrated the opaque aluminized film, the rays from the Sun would either fall on the cell or be reflected on it from the mirrorized walls. The cells were calibrated on the ground prior to the flight and the sensitivity was such that a particle about 25 microns in diameter could be detected. The glass flask detector represented a volume of air that had to be evacuated as the satellite left the atmosphere. For this purpose, a vent hole was provided in the rear of the flask. Preliminary ground tests indicated that the aluminized mylar film would not be torn by the expanding air, but post-flight analysis and tests indicated that the film was ruptured during launch, admitting large amounts of sunlight and making the experiments inoperative. Improper flask venting is assumed to be the probable cause of experiment failure.

=== Copper Wire Micrometeroite Detector ===
Forty-six copper wire card detectors, consisting of windings of fine wire mounted to 3.68 cm × 17.78 cm (1.45 in × 7.00 in) rectangular cards, were used to detect particle impacts. Fourteen of the cards had wire 50 microns thick, and 32 cards had wire 75 microns thick. The total exposed effective area was 0.11 m^{2}. The cards were mounted in quadrants on a fiberglass support on the end of the spacecraft cylinder opposite the end on which the antennas were mounted. A break in the wire of a card would change its resistance, and this would be reported via telemetry to the transmitter. Temperatures at the wire card surfaces were expected to extend from minus 10 °C (50 °F) to a maximum of 60 °C (140 °F), an amount sufficient to change the residence of the card. To compensate for this, a 100-ohm resistor was wired in parallel with a 300-phm fixed resistor and installed in series with each 50-micron card and with each pair of 75-micron cards. The particle size required to break a wire was estimated to be one-half the size of the wire. During the 2.5 days in which the satellite remained in orbit, no meteoroid hits were recorded.

=== Impact Detection ===
The purposes of the experiment were to extend micrometeoroid measurements to a low population range where few data exists and to correlate with and augment the data amassed by previous satellite experiments using similar techniques. The detector had three threshold levels of momentum sensitivity (0.01, 0.1, and 1.0 gm-cm/sec) and consisted of two different physical configurations of detecting surfaces. The first configuration, which was used for high and low sensitivity detection, consisted of a pair of impact-sensitive stainless steel plates mounted on the conical portion of the satellite forward shell. The plates, which had a total geometric area of 0.142 m^{2}, each had an attached transducer, as well as signal conditioning, impact-event counting, and count-storage circuitry. The second detector configuration was composed of 20 of the 0.013-cm thick pressurized-cell penetration detectors that were sensitized for impact detection. The cells, which had a total area of 0.186 m^{2}, were used for intermediate impact detection. The short orbital lifetime of the spacecraft (2.5 days) permitted only 10 interrogations of the satellite recorder. The measured impact flux rates were substantially higher than those obtained by earlier meteoroid experiments and probably contained false counts due to aerodynamic mechanical perturbances and temperature effects on impact-sensing transducer elements resulting from the low initial perigee. Hence, the data must be considered as inconclusive.

=== Pressurized Cell Micrometeorite Detector ===
The pressurized cells, which were the primary sensors of Explorer 13, occupied the major portion of the sensitive area. One hundred and sixty beryllium copper cells of five thicknesses were mounted around the periphery of the spacecraft in five circular rows, each row containing 32 cells. The cells were pressurized prior to launch with helium gas to about 10 psi over atmospheric pressure. By means of a pressure-activated switch on each cell, the pressure loss caused by a micrometeoroid impact could be detected and telemetered. No attempt was made to monitor the pressure leak rate. The number of cells of each thickness were as follows—sixty 0.0025 cm (0.00098 in), forty 0.0038 cm (0.0015 in), twenty 0.0076 cm (0.0030 in), twenty 0.064 cm (0.025 in), and twenty 0.130 cm (0.051 in). The penetration area of each detector was about 140-cm^{2} so that 2.25 m^{2} of area was exposed for the experiment. Because of the semicircular cross-section of the pressurized cells, however, the effective area for micrometeoroid capture was smaller than the exposed area. A large injection-angle error caused the spacecraft's orbital lifetime to be only 2.5 days, but information from the experiment was telemetered and recorded for 29 passes. There were no switch openings of the pressurized cell detectors during this time. Pressurized cell temperatures, which were shown to vary between 56 °C (133 °F) and 27 °C (81 °F), were monitored throughout the flight. There was no indication of any malfunctioning of the 160 pressurized-cell detectors during the launch and orbital lifetime of the vehicle.

== Launch ==
Explorer 13 was injected into a geocentric orbit of moderate eccentricity using a Scout X-1 launch vehicle. The orbit was lower than planned, and the spacecraft reentered in the atmosphere on 28 August 1961, after only slightly more than 2 days in orbit. No penetrations were recorded by this satellite during experiment operations. This aided in determination of useful flux limits for subsequent experiment design.

== See also ==
- Explorer program
