= RM-89 Blue Scout I =

American sounding rocket

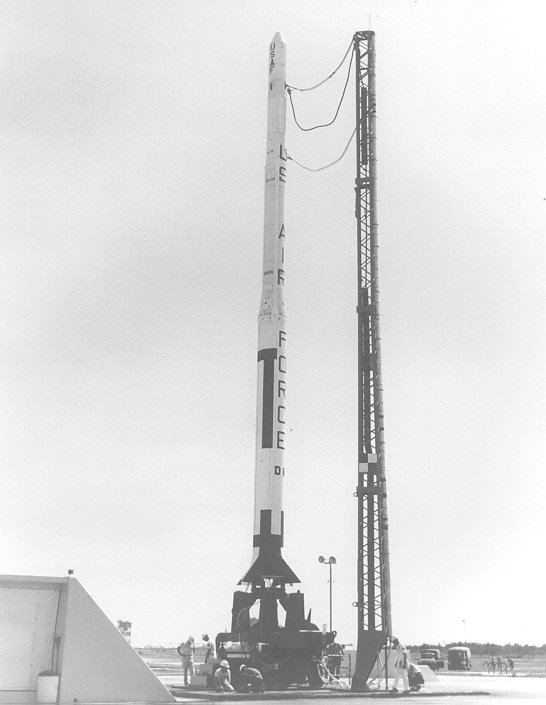
- Blue Scout D6 ahead of the second HETS launch
- Function: Sounding rocket
- Manufacturer: Vought
- Country of origin: United States

Size
- Height: 21.65 metres (71.0 ft)
- Diameter: 1.02 metres (3 ft 4 in)
- Mass: 16,738 kilograms (36,901 lb)
- Stages: Three

Associated rockets
- Family: Scout
- Derivative work: RM-90 Blue Scout II

Launch history
- Status: Retired
- Launch sites: Canaveral LC-18B
- Total launches: 4
- Success(es): 2
- Failure(s): 2
- First flight: 1961-01-07
- Last flight: 1962-04-12

First stage – Algol 1B
- Powered by: 1 solid
- Maximum thrust: 471 kilonewtons (106,000 lb_{f})
- Specific impulse: 236 sec
- Burn time: 40 seconds
- Propellant: Solid

Second stage – Castor 1A
- Powered by: 1 solid
- Maximum thrust: 286 kilonewtons (64,000 lb_{f})
- Specific impulse: 247 sec
- Burn time: 27 seconds
- Propellant: Solid

Third stage – Antares 1A
- Powered by: 1 X-254
- Maximum thrust: 60 kilonewtons (13,000 lb_{f})
- Specific impulse: 256 sec
- Burn time: 39 seconds
- Propellant: Solid

Fourth stage – Castor 1A
- Powered by: 1 X-254
- Maximum thrust: 65 kilonewtons (15,000 lb_{f})
- Specific impulse: 249 sec
- Burn time: 29 seconds
- Propellant: Solid

The RM-89 Blue Scout I was an American sounding rocket which was flown four times between January 1961 and April 1962. It was used for two HETS test flights, and a flight to investigate atmospheric re-entry. It was a member of the Scout family of rockets.

The Blue Scout I was a four-stage rocket derived from the Scout X-1. All four launches occurred from Launch Complex 18B at the Cape Canaveral Air Force Station. The first two launches were conducted on 7 January and 9 May 1961 respectively. They both carried HETS A1 plasma research experiments on suborbital trajectories. The second two launches were conducted on 12 April 1962, with a payload that was intended to investigate atmospheric reentry.

The first two launches was successful, however recovery of the payload failed. The second two launches failed due to problems with the Blue Scout.

The Blue Scout II was a four-stage derivative of the Blue Scout I. It was flown four times in 1961, twice with HETS payloads, and twice with the Mercury-Scout 1 satellite.
