= Aeros (motorcycle) =

- Production: 1927–1929
- Class: Motorcycle
- Engine: 347 cc, 497 cc three-valve OHC single-cylinder

Designed by Franz Bezina, the Aeros motorcycle was manufactured between 1927 and 1929. It featured a BMW-inspired frame with a leaf spring fork and 347 cc and 497 cc three-valve overhead camshaft single-cylinder engines.
