= AEROS =

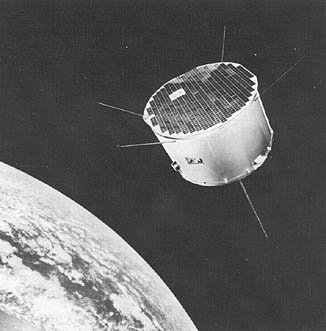
- AEROS Satellite
- Mission type: Earth observation
- Operator: BMBF and NASA
- COSPAR ID: AEROS A: 1972-100A; AEROS B: 1974-055A
- SATCAT no.: AEROS A: 6315; AEROS B: 7371

Spacecraft properties
- Launch mass: 125.7 kilograms (277 lb)

Start of mission
- Launch date: AEROS A: 16 December 1972; AEROS B: 16 July 1974
- Rocket: Scout
- Launch site: Vandenberg AFB

End of mission
- Decay date: AEROS A: 1973-08-22; AEROS B: 1975-09-25

Orbital parameters
- Reference system: Geocentric
- Regime: Low Earth
- Eccentricity: AEROS A: 0.04648; AEROS B: 0.04776
- Perigee altitude: AEROS A: 223 km (139 mi); AEROS B: 217 km (135 mi)
- Apogee altitude: AEROS A: 867 km (539 mi); AEROS B: 879 km (546 mi)
- Inclination: AEROS A: 96.9 degrees; AEROS B: 97.4 degrees
- Period: AEROS A: 95.6 minutes; AEROS B: 95.7 minutes
- Epoch: AEROS A: 15 December 1972, 19:00:00 UTC; AEROS B: 15 July 1974, 20:00:00 UTC

AEROS satellites were to study the aeronomy i. e. the science of the upper atmosphere and ionosphere, in particular the F region under the strong influence of solar extreme ultraviolet radiation. To this end the spectrum of this radiation was recorded aboard by one instrument (of type Hinteregger) on the one hand and a set of 4 other instruments measuring the most important neutral uand iononized parameters at the satellite's position on the other.

AEROS was built by Ball Aerospace for a co-operative project between NASA and the Bundesministerium für Foschung und Technologie (BMwF), Federal Republic of Germany.

Named for the Greek god of the air at the suggestion of the BMwF .

AEROS A and B carried identical instrumentation only the instrument measuring short scale variations of the electron density didn't work on A. A third Aeros C was planned for Earth Resources studies in a 3-axis spin-stabilized configuration, to be launched by a Shuttle in 1986.^{(Needs research)}

== Specifications ==
Source: Yenne

- Launch vehicles: Scout
- Launch location: Western Space and Missile Center at Vandenberg AFB
- Launch dates: 16 December 1972 (AEROS), 16 July 1974 (AEROS B)
- Re-entry dates: 22 August 1973 (AEROS), 2 September 1975 (AEROS B)
- Total weight: 280 pounds and 436 pounds for AEROS C
- Diameter: 36 inches
- Height: 28 inches
- Shape: Cylindrical
- Power: Solar cells/nickel-cadmium batteries
- Power requirements: 4.7-34.3 watts
