= Polar BEAR =

1986 U.S. space mission

Polar BEAR, short for Polar Beacon Experiment and Auroral Research, was a 1986 U.S. military space mission. Also known as STP P87-1 or STP P87-A, the craft was built for the Air Force by Johns Hopkins University's Applied Physics Laboratory (APL).

To save money, a satellite was retrieved from the National Air and Space Museum, where it had been on display for almost a decade. It was launched on November 13, 1986, from Vandenberg AFB. Its science mission was to investigate communications interference caused by solar flares and auroral activity, continuing the work of the previous HILAT ("High Latitude") mission.
