= Scout X-1 =

U.S. sounding and orbital rocket, 1960-1961

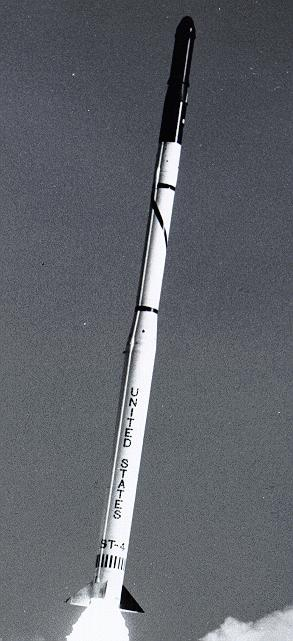
- Launch of Explorer 9 on a Scout X-1
- Function: Expendable launch system Sounding rocket
- Manufacturer: Vought
- Country of origin: United States

Size
- Height: 25 m (82 ft)
- Diameter: 1.01 m (3 ft 4 in)
- Mass: 16,240 kg (35,800 lb)
- Stages: 4

Associated rockets
- Family: Scout
- Derivative work: Scout X-1A; Blue Scout I Blue Scout II

Launch history
- Status: Retired
- Launch sites: Wallops LA-3
- Total launches: 7
- Success(es): 3
- Failure: 4
- First flight: 1960-07-02
- Last flight: 1961-10-19

First stage – Algol 1B
- Powered by: 1 solid
- Maximum thrust: 471 kN (106,000 lb_{f})
- Specific impulse: 236 seconds
- Burn time: 40 seconds
- Propellant: Solid

Second stage – Castor 1A
- Powered by: 1 solid
- Maximum thrust: 286 kN (64,000 lb_{f})
- Specific impulse: 247 seconds
- Burn time: 27 seconds
- Propellant: Solid

Third stage – Antares 1A
- Powered by: 1 X-254
- Maximum thrust: 60 kN (13,000 lb_{f})
- Specific impulse: 256 seconds
- Burn time: 39 seconds
- Propellant: Solid

Fourth stage – Altair 1A
- Powered by: 1 X-248A
- Maximum thrust: 14 kN (3,100 lb_{f})
- Specific impulse: 255 seconds
- Burn time: 40 seconds
- Propellant: Solid

Scout X-1 was an American expendable launch system and sounding rocket which was flown seven times between August 1960 and October 1961. Four orbital and three suborbital launches were made, with four of the launches resulting in failures.

The Scout X-1 was similar to the Scout X test vehicle which was launched in April 1960, however it had live second and fourth stages, as opposed to the battleship versions used on the Scout X. It also featured an improved first stage, using an Algol 1B instead of the earlier Algol 1A used on the Scout X.

Several derivatives of the Scout X-1 were also flown. The United States Navy developed the Blue Scout, which was a three-stage sounding rocket, and the Blue Scout II which was almost identical to the Scout X-1. The Scout X-1A, a five-stage variant of the Scout X-1, was used for a single suborbital launch in March 1962. It featured an improved first stage, and a NOTS-17 upper stage.

== Launches ==
Scout X-1 was flown seven times between August 1960 and October 1961 from Launch Area 3 at the Wallops Flight Facility.

The maiden flight was a suborbital test of the rocket's systems, and was conducted on 2 July 1960, with the rocket launching at 00:04 GMT. Following this, a suborbital radiation experiment was successfully launched on 4 October 1960. The first orbital launch attempt, with the S-56 satellite, was made on 4 December 1960, and ended in failure after the second stage malfunctioned.

On 16 February 1961, a Scout X-1 successfully placed Explorer 9, a reflight of the failed S-56, into Earth orbit, in the first successful orbital launch to be conducted by a Scout rocket. The next launch attempt on 30 June 1961 carried the S-55 satellite, but this did not reach orbit because the third stage failed to ignite. A reflight of S-55, Explorer 13, was launched on 25 August 1961, but reached a lower than planned orbit, and was unusable. The final flight of the Scout X-1 was made on 19 October 1961, carrying plasma and aeronomy research payloads on a suborbital trajectory. This launch was successful.

Date	Serial	Agency	Apogee (km)	Mission Description
1960 July 2	ST-1	NASA	1380	Suborbital test, failure
1960 October 4	ST-2	NASA	5600	Radiation Probe Plasma mission
1960 December 4	ST-3	NASA		S-56, failure (second stage malfunction)
1961 February 16	ST-4	USAF	2433	Explorer 9
1961 June 30	ST-5	NASA		S-55, failure (third stage did not ignite)
1961 August 25	ST-6	NASA		Explorer 13, partial failure
1961 October 19	ST-7	NASA	6855	P-21 Plasma / aeronomy mission

== See also ==
- Scout
- Scout X-1A
- Blue Scout I
- Blue Scout II
