= Wallops Flight Facility Launch Area 3 =

Rocket launch site on Wallops Island, Virginia, U.S.

Launch Area 3
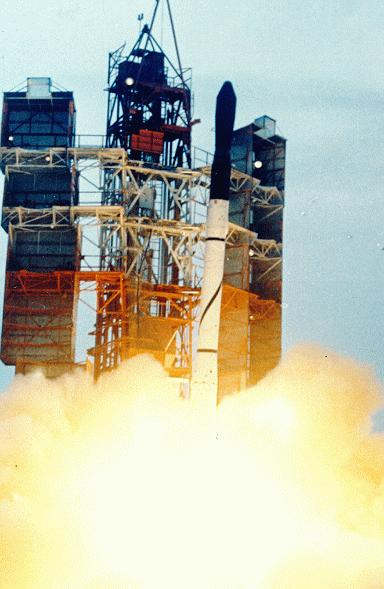
- Launch of a Scout X-1 from the original LA-3
- Launch site: Wallops Flight Facility
- Location: 37.8506°N 75.4725°W
- Short name: LA-3
- Operator: NASA
- Total launches: 45
- Launch pad(s): Two
LA-3 (Mk.I) launch history
- Status: Inactive
- Launches: 22
- First launch: 1960-04-18
- Last launch: 1970-03-07
- Associated rockets: Scout X Scout X-1; Scout X-1A; Scout X-2; Scout X-3; Scout X-3A; Scout X-4; Scout X-4A; Nike-Apache; Nike-Iroquois
LA-3A (Mk.II) launch history
- Status: Inactive
- Launches: 23
- First launch: 1964-07-20
- Last launch: 1985-12-13
- Associated rockets: Scout X-3C; Scout X-4; Scout X-4A; Scout X-5C; Scout B Scout B-1; Scout D-1; Scout G-1

Launch Area 3 (LA-3) at the Wallops Flight Facility is a launch complex which was used, mostly by Scout rockets, between 1960 and 1985. Forty-one Scout launches occurred from the complex, making both orbital and suborbital. In addition, four Nike sounding rockets were launched from the complex in 1970.

Launch Area 3 contains two launch pads, Area 3 and Area 3A.

Area 3, also known as the Mk.I launcher, was used by eighteen Scout rockets between 1960 and 1964. The first launch from the complex, on 18 April 1960, was the maiden flight of the Scout launch vehicle, using the Scout X configuration. The last Scout launch from the pad occurred on 6 November 1964. On 7 March 1970, a Nike-Apache and four Nike-Iroquois rockets were launched from the complex.

The upgraded Launch Area 3A, or Mk.II launcher, replaced the original Launch Area 3. It was used for twenty-three Scout launches, starting on 20 July 1964. The last launch from the complex occurred on 13 December 1985.

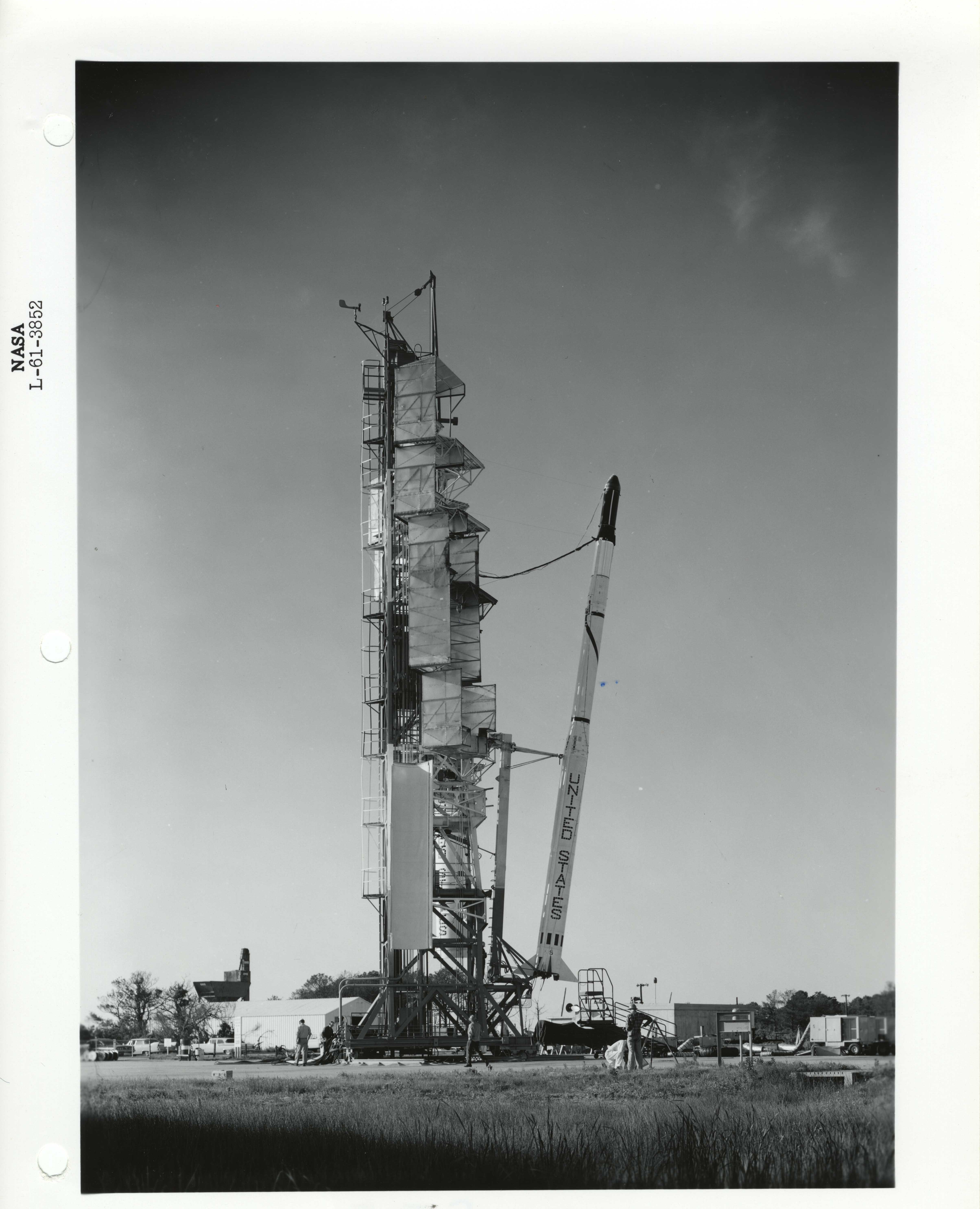
Rocket being Lifted onto the Launch Structure to be Prepared for Launch at the Wallops Island Launch Area in Virginia, 1961

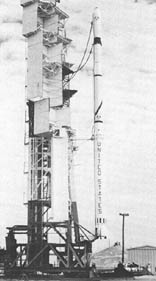
Scout rocket on the launch pad at Wallops Flight Center.

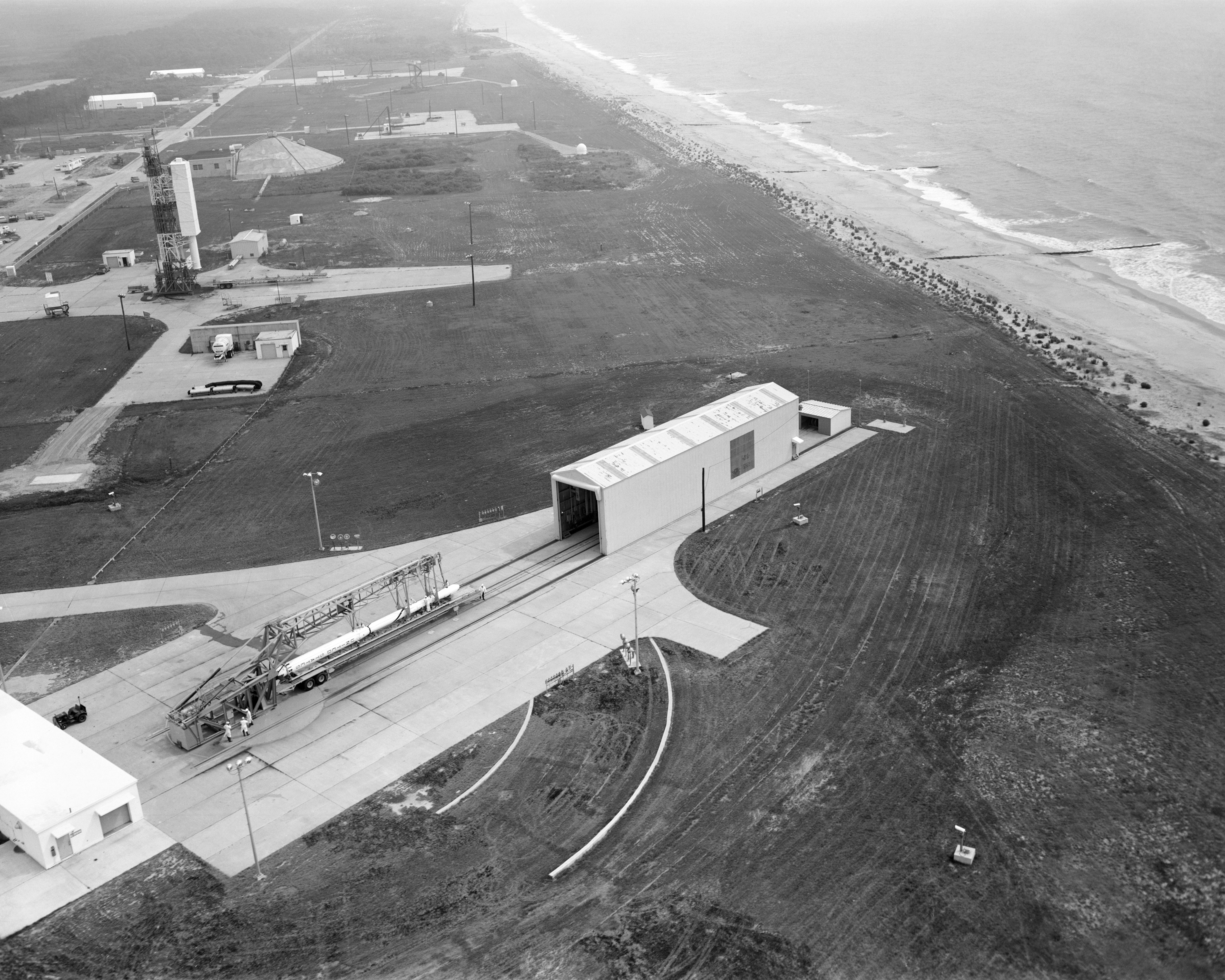
B4-988/ Scout rocket (#S-138R) in horizontal position at LA-3A in 1965. LA-3 visible at the top left.

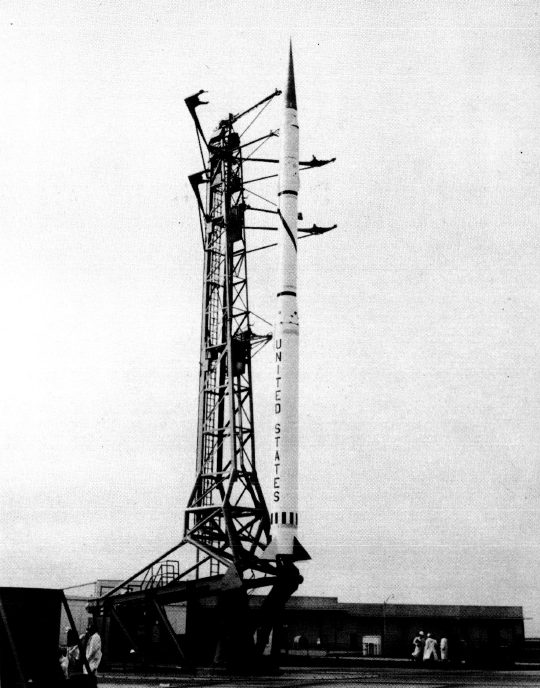
Scout-X5C with Reentry-F payload on launch pad at Wallops Island, 1968

== Launches ==
List of launches from Area 3, Mk.I launcher:

Date	Launch Vehicle	Mission	Apogee	Details
1960 April 18	Scout X	Cub Scout test		Live first and third stages, broke up after first stage burnout.
1960 July 2	Scout X-1	Test mission	1380 km	Failure.
1960 October 4	Scout X-1	Radiation Probe Plasma mission	5600 km	
1960 December 4	Scout X-1	Explorer (9) S 56		Second stage malfunction.
1961 February 16	Scout X-1	Explorer 9		Third stage failed ignition, vehicle destroyed.
1961 August 25	Scout X-1	Explorer 13		Partial failure.
1961 October 19	Scout X-1	P-21 Plasma / aeronomy mission	6855 km	
1962 March 1	Scout X-1A	Reentry 1 re-entry vehicle test flight	214 km	
1962 March 29	Scout X-2	P-21A Plasma / aeronomy mission	6291 km	Late stage 3 ignition.
1962 December 16	Scout X-3A	Explorer 16		
1963 May 22	Scout X-3	RFD-1 re-entry vehicle test flight	145 km	
1963 June 28	Scout X-4	GRS		Failure.
1963 July 20	Scout X-3A	Reentry 3 re-entry vehicle test flight	2 km	NASA Scout rocket, intentionally destroyed when it deviated from its course a few seconds after liftoff.
1964 March 27	Scout X-3	Ariel 2		
1964 August 18	Scout X-4A	Reentry 4A	183 km	
1964 November 6	Scout X-4	Explorer 23		
1970 March 7	Nike Apache	Eclipse aeronomy mission	200 km	
1970 March 7	Nike Iroquois	Mass spectrometer Eclipse aeronomy mission	76 km	
1970 March 7	Nike Iroquois	Mass spectrometer Eclipse aeronomy mission	113 km	
1970 March 7	Nike Iroquois	Mass spectrometer Eclipse aeronomy mission	122 km	

List of launches from Area 3A, Mk.II launcher:

Date	Launch Vehicle	Mission	Apogee
1964 July 20	Scout X-4	SERT 1 Technology mission	4002 km
1964 October 9	Scout X-3C	RFD-2 re-entry vehicle test flight	132 km
1964 December 15	Scout X-4	San Marco 1	842 km
1965 April 29	Scout X-4	Explorer 27	1309 km
1965 August 10	Scout B	SECOR 5 (EGRS 5)	2419 km
1965 November 19	Scout X-4	Explorer 30	856 km
1966 February 10	Scout X-4A	Reentry 4B Re-entry vehicle test	175 km
1966 June 10	Scout B	OV3-04	4704 km
1967 October 19	Scout B	RAM C-1 Re-entry vehicle test	217 km
1968 March 5	Scout B	Explorer 37 (Partial Failure)	433 km
1968 April 27	Scout X-5C	Reentry 5 re-entry vehicle test flight	175 km
1968 August 22	Scout B	RAM C-2 Re-entry vehicle test	227 km
1970 September 30	Scout B	RAM C-3 re-entry vehicle test flight	269 km
1970 November 9	Scout B	OFO 1, RM-1, RMS	518, 526 km
1971 June 20	Scout B	PAET re-entry vehicle test flight	377 km
1971 July 8	Scout B	Explorer 44	632 km
1971 August 16	Scout B-1	Eole 1	836 km
1971 September 20	Scout B	BIC Plasma / barium release mission	31479 km
1972 August 13	Scout D-1	Explorer 46	811 km
1976 June 18	Scout D-1	GP-A Physics mission	10230 km
1979 February 18	Scout D-1	SAGE	506 km
1979 June 2	Scout D-1	Ariel 6	383 km
1985 December 13	Scout G-1	USA 13 (ITV 1 ASAT Balloon Target), ITV 1 Balloon A, ITV 1 Balloon B, USA 14 (ITV 2 ASAT Balloon Target)	691, 737, 160, 450 km

== See also ==
- Cape Canaveral Launch Complex 18
- San Marco platform
- Vandenberg Space Launch Complex 5
