= Scout (rocket family) =

Family of American rockets

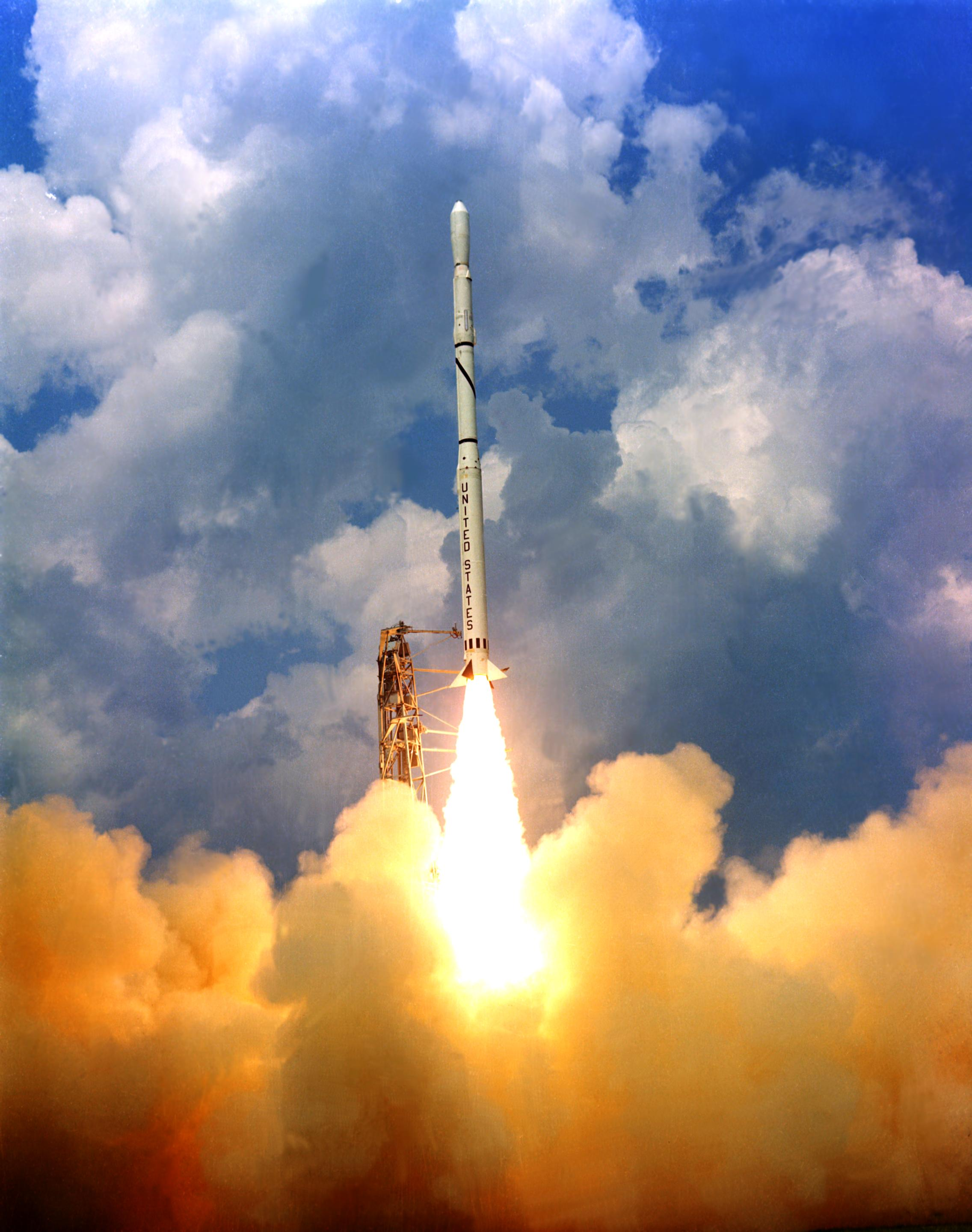
- The first launch of Scout B, in 1965.
- Function: Orbital launch vehicle
- Manufacturer: LTV Aerospace Corporation
- Country of origin: United States

Launch history
- Status: Retired

The Scout family of rockets were American launch vehicles designed to place small satellites into orbit around the Earth. The Scout multistage rocket was the first orbital launch vehicle to be entirely composed of solid fuel stages. It was also the only vehicle of that type until the successful launch of the Japanese Lambda 4S in 1970.

The original Scout (a backronym for Solid Controlled Orbital Utility Test system) was designed in 1957 at the NACA, at Langley center. Scout launch vehicles were used from 1961 until 1994. To enhance reliability the development team opted to use "off the shelf" hardware, originally produced for military programs. According to the NASA fact sheet:

"... the first stage motor was a combination of the Jupiter Senior and the Navy Polaris; the second stage came from the Army MGM-29 Sergeant; and the third and fourth stage motors were designed by Langley engineers who adapted a version of the Navy Vanguard."

The first successful orbital launch of a Scout, on February 16, 1961, delivered Explorer 9, a 7 kilograms (15 lb) satellite used for atmospheric density studies, into orbit. The final launch of a Scout, using a Scout G-1, was on May 8, 1994, from Vandenberg Air Force Base. The payload was the Miniature Sensor Technology Integration Series 2 (MSTI-2) military spacecraft with a mass of 163 kilograms (359 lb). MSTI-2 successfully acquired and tracked a LGM-30 Minuteman missile.

The standard Scout launch vehicle was a solid propellant, four-stage booster system, approximately 23 meters (75 ft) in length with a launch weight of 21,499 kilograms (47,397 lb).

== Scout A ==
The Scout A was used for launches of the Transit NNSS series (Transit-O 6 to 19), placing two satellites in orbit at the same time. Twelve flights were conducted between 21 December 1965 and 27 August 1970. It was also used to launch the British Ariel 3 scientific satellite. Standard payload capability was 122 kg into a low-Earth orbit.

=== Parameters ===
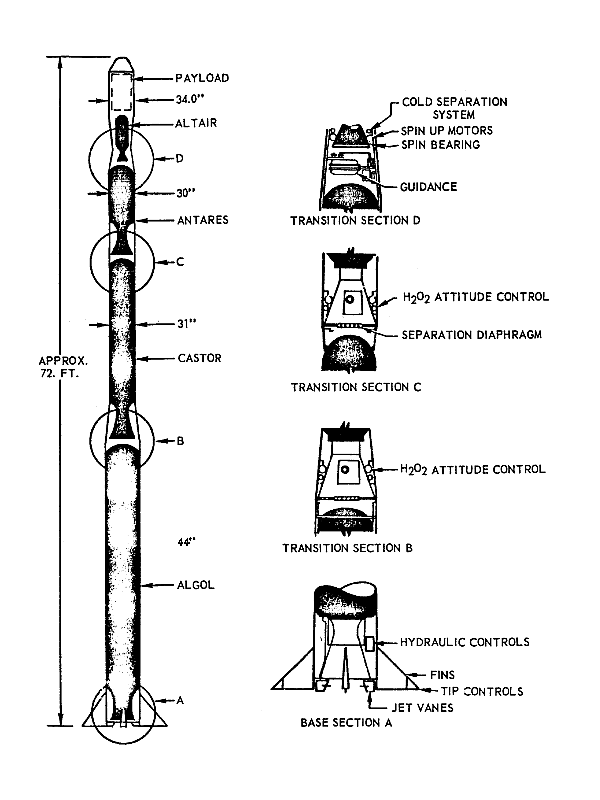
Scout vehicle general arrangement

- Thrust at liftoff: 513.40 kN (52,352 kgf)
- Mass at launch: 17,850 kg
- Diameter: 1.01 m
- Length: 25.00 m

Stage 1: Algol

- Derived from Polaris missile
- Gross Mass: 11,600 kg
- Empty Mass: 1,650 kg
- Vacuum thrust: 564.25 kN (57,537 kgf)
- Burn time: 47 s
- Diameter: 1.01 m
- Span: 1.01 m
- Length: 9.09 m

Stage 2: Castor

- Derived from Sergeant missile
- Gross Mass: 4,424 kg
- Empty Mass: 695 kg
- Vacuum thrust: 258.92 kN (26,402 kgf)
- Burn time: 37 s
- Diameter: 0.79 m
- Span: 0.79 m
- Length: 6.04 m

Stage 3: Antares

- Gross Mass: 1,400 kg
- Empty Mass: 300 kg
- Vacuum thrust: 93.09 kN (9,493 kgf)
- Burn time: 36 s
- Diameter: 0.78 m
- Span: 0.78 m
- Length: 2.90 m

Stage 4: Altair

- Gross Mass: 275 kg
- Empty Mass: 37 kg
- Vacuum thrust: 22.24 kN (2,268 kgf)
- Burn time: 28 s
- Diameter: 0.64 m
- Span: 0.64 m
- Length: 2.53 m

== Scout-X1 (NASA) ==
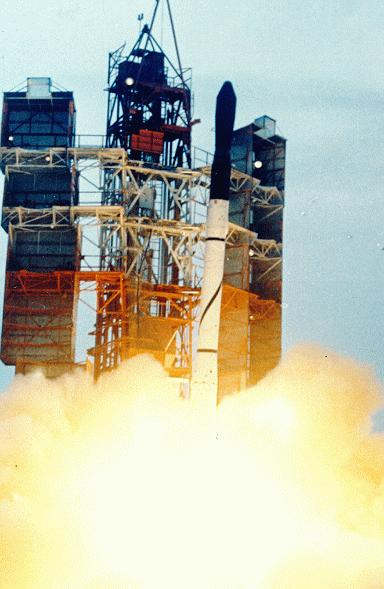
First launch of satellite on Scout X-1 - Explorer 9, Wallops, 16 Feb 1961

In the late 1950s, NASA established the Scout program to develop a multistage solid-propellant space booster and research rocket. The U.S. Air Force also participated in the program, but different requirements led to some divergence in the development of NASA and USAF Scouts.

The basic NASA Scout configuration, from which all variants were derived, was known as Scout-X1. It was a four-stage rocket, which used the following motors:

- 1st stage: Aerojet General Algol
- 2nd stage: Thiokol XM33 Castor
- 3rd stage: Allegany Ballistics Laboratory X-254 Antares
- 4th stage: Allegany Ballistics Laboratory X-248 Altair

Scout's first-stage motor was based on an earlier version of the Navy's Polaris missile motor; the second-stage motor was developed from the Army's Sergeant surface-to-surface missile; and the third- and fourth-stage motors were adapted by NASA's Langley Research Center; Hampton, VA, from the Navy's Vanguard launch vehicle. Unlike the Thor or Atlas-Agena the Scout was non-military and could be sold to foreign customers.

The Scout X-1 first flew successfully on 10 October 1960, after an earlier failure in July 1960. The rocket's first stage had four stabilizing fins, and the vehicle incorporated a gyro-based guidance system for attitude stabilization to keep the rocket on course.

=== Satellites orbited ===
- San Marco 1, the first Italian satellite (in 1964), launched by an Italian crew.
- San Marco 2, the second Italian satellite (in 1967) and first in the world launched from a sea platform. Three more San Marco satellites would use Scout rockets. Italy owned San Marco platform launched in 1967-1984 Scout rockets only.
- AEREOS and AEROS B atmospheric research
- Ariel 3, the first satellite designed and constructed in the United Kingdom, and four other Ariel satellites (Ariel 2, 4, 5 and 6) including first satellite for radioastronomy - Ariel 2.
- Magsat, the first globally complete 3D map of Earth's magnetic fields.
- Transit satellites, a prototype satellite Transit 5A was launched 1962-12-19 by a Scout X-3. On four different flights, Scout rockets placed two Transit satellites in orbit with a single launch. The last of these, on 1988-08-25, launched Transit-O 31 and Transit O-25 on a Scout G rocket.
- OFO-A, launched bullfrogs into space for biological experiments (1970)
- FR-1, a French satellite used to study VLF propagation (1965)
- Astronomical Netherlands Satellite, ANS was the first Dutch satellite (30 August 1974). (ANS; also known as Astronomische Nederlandse Satelliet) was a space-based X-ray and ultraviolet telescope.
- Miniature Sensor Technology Integration Series 2 (MSTI-2), launched into low earth orbit on 8 May 1994 local time aboard the last NASA SCOUT booster.
- Explorer 9, 13(S 55), 13(S 55a), 16, 19, 20, 22, 23, 24, 27, 30, 37, 39, 42, 45, 46, 48, 52, 53, 56, and 57
- Uhuru, the first XRay orbital observatory, which confirmed the first black hole detected Cygnus X-1
- ESRO 1 A/B, 2A/B,
- Miranda
- ANS 1
- San Marco 4, 5
- Triad 2
- Gravity Probe A
- Triad 3
- Transat
- AEM 1, 2
- Nova 1
- Nova 2
- HILAT
- Nova 3
- ITV 1, 2
- Polar BEAR
- REX 1
- SAMPEX
- Radical
- DSAP 1 F1, F2, F3, F4, F5
- RFD 1, 2.
- OTV3 1, 2, 3, 4, 5.

== Scout X-1A ==
Scout X-1A was an American sounding rocket which was flown in 1962. It was a five-stage derivative of the earlier Scout X-1, with an uprated first stage, and a NOTS-17 upper stage.

== Scout X-2 ==
Scout X-2 was an American expendable launch system and sounding rocket which was flown twice in 1962. It was a four-stage rocket, based on the earlier Scout X-1, introducing the Algol 1D and Antares 2B stage upgrades. On 1962-08-23 a Scout X-2 was used for the first successful launch of a DMSP satellite, lifting off from Point Arguello near Vandenberg Air Force Base.

== Scout X-3 ==
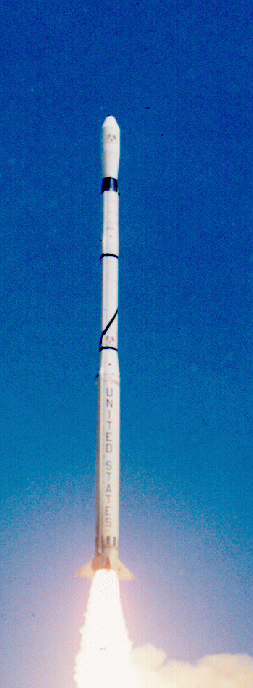
Scout X-3 with first British built satellite Ariel 2, 1964

The Scout X-3 flew after 1962 and introduced the Algol IIA upgrade.

== Scout X-4 ==
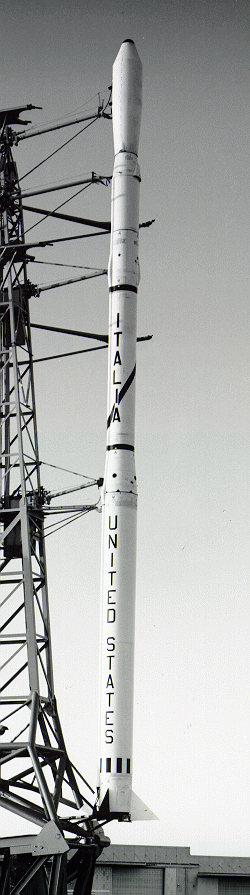
Scout X-4 with first Italian satellite San Marco 1, 1964

The Scout X-4 flew after 1963 and introduced Altair 2 upgrade.

== Scout A-1 ==
The Scout A-1 flew in 1973 and introduced the Castor IIA upgrades.

== Scout B-1 ==
The Scout B-1 flew after 1971 and introduced the Altair III upgrades.

== Scout D-1 ==
The Scout D-1 flew in 1972 and introduced the Algol III upgrade.

== Scout F-1 ==
The Scout F-1 flew twice in 1975, and was composed of a Algol-3A first stage, a Castor-2A second stage, a Antares-2B third stage and a Star-20 fourth stage. It successfully launched Small Astronomy Satellite 3 from the San Marco Launch Complex, but failed on launching the Dual Air Density Explorer satellites from Vandenberg.

== Scout G-1 ==
The Scout G-1 flew from 1974 until the Scout's retirement in 1994. It was rated to orbit a 210 kg payload.

== XRM-89 Blue Scout I (USAF) ==
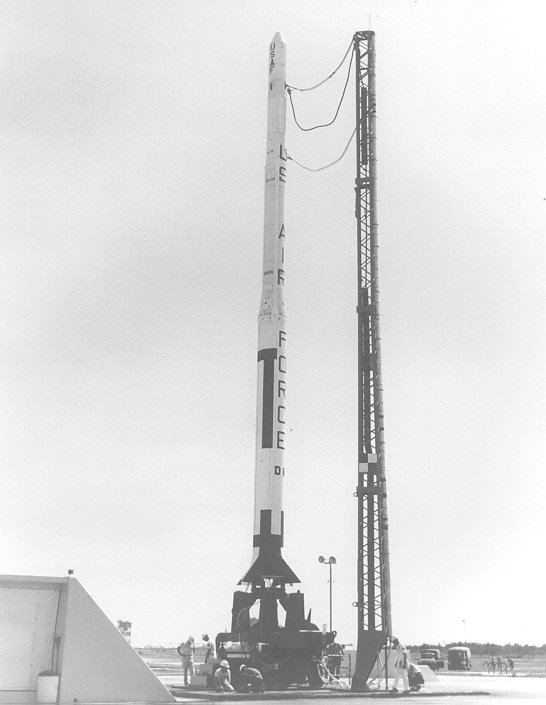
Blue Scout I on LC-18 in 1961

The USAF Scout program was known as HETS (Hyper Environmental Test System) or System 609A, and the rockets were generally referred to as Blue Scout. The prime contractor for the NASA Scout was LTV, but the Blue Scout prime contractor was Ford Aeronutronics.

By using different combinations of rocket stages, the USAF created several different Blue Scout configurations. One of these was the XRM-89 Blue Scout I, which was a three-stage vehicle, using Castor 2 and an Antares 1A stages, but omitting the basic Scout's Altair 4th stage. The first launch of an XRM-89 occurred on 1961-01-07, and was mostly successful. On that flight, the XRM-89 carried a variety of experiments to measure rocket performance and high-altitude fields and particle radiation. The payload was located in a recoverable reentry capsule, but the capsule sank before it could be recovered from the water. The only other XRM-89 launches (in May 1961 and April 1962) were unsuccessful, and the Blue Scout I program was terminated in 1962.

== XRM-90 Blue Scout II (USAF) ==
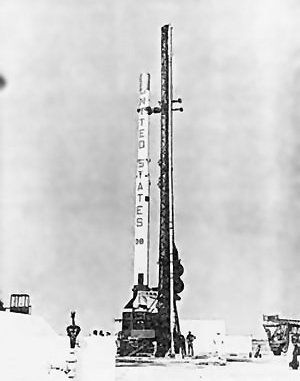
Mercury-Scout 1, an Air Force Blue Scout II launched for NASA

The XRM-90 Blue Scout II was a rocket of the U.S. Air Force's System 609A Blue Scout family. The XRM-90 was a four-stage rocket, which used the same stages as the basic NASA Scout. It was nevertheless not identical to the latter, because the 4th stage was hidden in a payload fairing with the same diameter as the 3rd stage, and the first stage nozzle used a flared tail skirt between the fins. Externally, the XRM-90 was indistinguishable from the XRM-89 Blue Scout I.

The first XRM-90 launch occurred on 1961-03-03, followed by a second one on 1961-04-12. Both sub-orbital flights were successful, and measured radiation levels in the Van Allen belts. The second Blue Scout II also carried a micrometeorite sampling experiment, but the recovery of the reentry capsule failed. The third XRM-90 was used by NASA in November 1961 for Mercury-Scout 1. This was an attempt to orbit a communications payload for Project Mercury, but the rocket failed after 28 seconds of flight. The USAF subsequently abandoned the XRM-89 Blue Scout I and XRM-90 Blue Scout II vehicles, and shifted to the RM-91/SLV-1B Blue Scout Junior instead.

== XRM-91 Blue Scout Junior / Journeyman B (USAF) ==
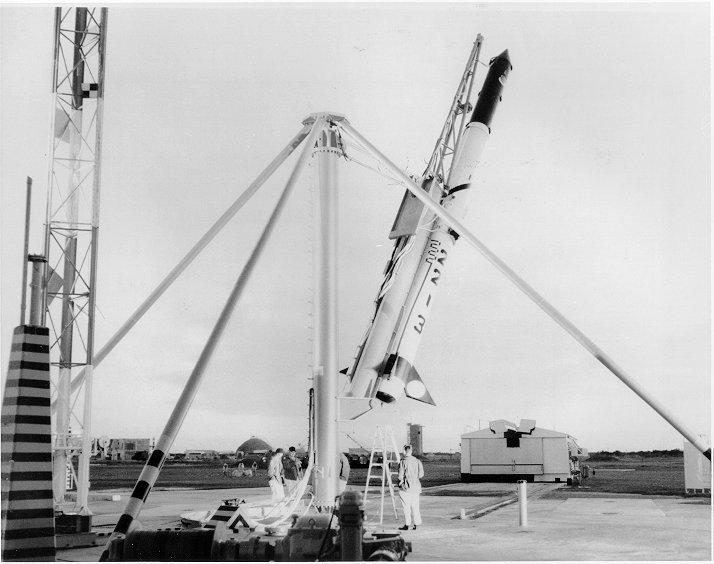
Blue Scout Junior

The XRM-91 Blue Scout Junior (sometimes called Journeyman B) was a rocket of the U.S. Air Force's System 609A Blue Scout family. Although the Blue Scout Junior had sufficient impulse to have put a small satellite in low Earth orbit, it was not used as an orbital launch vehicle. The XRM-91 did not resemble the other Scout variants externally, because the usual first Scout stage (an Aerojet General Algol) was not used. Instead, the four-stage Blue Scout Junior used Scout's 2nd and 3rd stages (Castor and Antares) as the first two stages, and added an Aerojet General Alcor and a spherical NOTS Cetus in a common nose fairing. The XRM-91 also lacked the gyro-stabilization and guidance system of the RM-89 Blue Scout I and RM-90 Blue Scout II, making it a completely unguided rocket. It relied on second-stage fins and two spin motors to achieve a stable flight trajectory.

The first launch of an XRM-91 occurred on September 21, 1960, making it actually the first Blue Scout configuration to fly. The flight was planned to make radiation and magnetic field measurements at distances of up to 26,700 km (16,600 miles) from earth, and while the rocket did indeed achieve this altitude, the telemetry system failed so that no data was received. The second launch in November ended with a failure during second stage burn. The third flight was to measure particle densities in the Van Allen belts and reached a distance of 225,000 km (140,000 miles), but again a telemetry failure prevented the reception of scientific data. The fourth and final XRM-91 mission in December 1961 also carried particle detectors, and was the only completely successful flight of the initial Blue Scout Junior program.

The Blue Scout Junior was regarded by the USAF as the most useful of the various Blue Scout configurations. It was used (in slightly modified form) between 1962 and 1965 by the Air Force as the SLV-1B/C launch vehicle for suborbital scientific payloads. The SLV-1C was also chosen as the rocket for the MER-6A interim ERCS (Emergency Rocket Communications System) vehicle; this provided a reliable and survivable emergency communications method for the United States National Command Authority, using a UHF repeater that would transmit pre-recorded messages to all units within line-of-sight of the rocket's apogee.

NASA used a three-stage Blue Scout Junior configuration (omitting the Cetus 4th stage) as the RAM B.

== San Marco Project ==
The Italian space research program began in 1959 with the creation of the CRA (Centro Ricerche Aerospaziali) at the University of Rome. Three years later, on 7 September 1962, the university signed a memorandum of understanding with NASA to collaborate on a space research program named San Marco (St. Mark). The Italian launch team was trained by NASA. The San Marco project was focused on the launching of scientific satellites by Scout rockets from a mobile rigid platform located close to the equator. This station, composed of 2 platforms, 1 3-leg control platform called Santa Rita where the launch center and radar was located, and another platform called San Marco, housing the movable shelter for the missile and the launcher. These platforms were installed off the Kenya coast, close to the town of Malindi. During launch, the San Marco platform was vacated of all persons. Two support boats ferried the crews daily to the platforms from the land base.

== Debris ==
The Scout rockets have contributed to several pieces of debris over the years, some of which is still orbiting as of 2023.

== See also ==
- Comparison of orbital launchers families
