= List of Vandenberg Space Force Base launch facilities =

Launch sites at Vandenberg Space Force Base
Active pads
Active pads not used for launches
Inactive leased pads
Inactive unleased pads
1 SLC-1E
2 SLC-1W
3 SLC-2E
4 SLC-2W
5 SLC-10E
6 SLC-10W
7 LC-576E
8 SLC-9
9 SLC-3E
10 SLC-3W
11 SLC-4E
12 SLC-4W (LZ-4)
13 SLC-5
14 SLC-6
15 SLC-8
16 SLC-7
17 SLC-11
18 SLC-12
19 SLC-14
20 SLC-15

Vandenberg Space Force Base, located at Point Arguello in Santa Barbara County, California, is home to the United States' Western Range and is considered the second most active rocket range and spaceport in the country (following Cape Canaveral and Merritt Island in Florida). At the military base are several Space Launch Complexes (SLC) used for launching payloads into polar orbits, with some of them currently active and more slated for future reactivation. Additionally, there are dozens of Intercontinental Ballistic Missile (ICBM) Launch Facilities (LF) at Vandenberg used for testing the missiles over the Pacific.

== Orbital launch sites ==
=== Key ===
Denotes sites actively being used for launches
Denotes sites actively used for non-launch activities, such as landing
Denotes inactive sites planned with future use in mind
Denotes unused inactive sites
Denotes demolished, unbuilt, or never used sites

=== Active and repurposed sites ===
Complex	Tenant	Uses	Notable launches	Coordinates
Space Launch Complex 2 West	Firefly Aerospace	Current: Alpha; Future: Eclipse; Retired: Thor, Thor-Agena, Thor-Ablestar, Delta I, Delta II	STARAD, Landsat 1, COBE, Aqua, Aura, Gravity Probe B, USA-193, WISE, ICESat-2	34°45′19″N 120°37′20″W
Space Launch Complex 4 East	SpaceX	Current: Falcon 9 Retired: Atlas-Agena, Titan IIID, Titan 34D, Titan IV	SNAP-10A, Jason-3, DART, SWOT, EarthCARE, SPHEREx	34°37′55″N 120°36′36″W
Space Launch Complex 4 West	SpaceX	Current: Falcon 9 first stage landing zone Retired: Atlas-Agena, Titan IIIB, Titan 23G	Clementine, QuickSCAT, SAOCOM-1A (landing)	34°37′59″N 120°36′56″W
Space Launch Complex 8	Northrop Grumman	Current: Minotaur I, Minotaur IV; Cancelled: Athena I, Athena II	USA-165	34°34′34″N 120°37′56″W
Launch Complex 576E	Northrop Grumman	Current: Minotaur-C; Retired: Atlas F Cancelled: RS1; No launches since 2017.	Orbiting Carbon Observatory, Glory	34°44′22″N 120°37′08″W

=== Sites leased for future use ===
Site	Tenant	Uses	Notable launches	Coordinates
Space Launch Complex 3 East	United Launch Alliance	Future: Vulcan Centaur; Retired: Atlas-Agena, Atlas SLV-3, Atlas-Burner, Atlas E/F, Atlas H, Atlas II, Atlas V	X-23 PRIME, GPS-1, Terra, USA-247, InSight, Landsat 9, LOFTID	34°38′25″N 120°35′23″W
Space Launch Complex 5	Phantom Space	Future: Daytona I Retired: Scout	Explorer 19, HCMM, SAMPEX	34°36′28″N 120°37′27″W
Space Launch Complex 6	SpaceX	Future: Falcon 9, Falcon Heavy; Retired: Athena I, Athena II, Delta IV, Delta IV Heavy; Cancelled: Titan IIIC, Titan IIIM MOL, Space Shuttle, Titan IV, OmegA	STS-62-A (cancelled), Lewis	34°34′52″N 120°37′39″W
Space Launch Complex 14	Blue Origin	Future: New Glenn		34°33′30″N 120°34′47″W

=== Inactive and undeveloped sites ===
Site	Status	Uses	Notable launches	Coordinates
Space Launch Complex 1 East	Inactive	Retired: Thor-Agena, Thorad-Agena	Discoverer 2, Discoverer 14	34°45′22″N 120°37′35″W
Space Launch Complex 1 West	Inactive	Retired: Thor-Agena, Thorad-Agena	Discoverer 13	34°45′26″N 120°37′50″W
Space Launch Complex 2 East	Inactive	Retired: Thor, Thor-Agena, Thor-Ablestar, Thorad-Agena, Delta I	Alouette 1, Nimbus 1	34°45′05″N 120°37′09″W
Space Launch Complex 3 West	Inactive	Retired: Atlas-Agena, Thor-Agena, Thorad-Agena, Atlas E/F; Cancelled: Falcon 1	Seasat, Solwind	34°38′37″N 120°35′34″W
Space Launch Complex 7	Undeveloped	Cancelled: Titan IV		34°34′24″N 120°36′19″W
Space Launch Complex 9	Undeveloped	Cancelled: New Glenn		34°39′27″N 120°35′26″W
Space Launch Complex 10 East	Inactive	Retired: Thor		34°45′45″N 120°37′17″W
Space Launch Complex 10 West	Inactive	Retired: Thor, Thor-Burner, Thor DSV-2U		34°45′49″N 120°37′29″W
Space Launch Complex 11	Undeveloped	Cancelled: Terran 1, Terran R		34°33′58″N 120°37′49″W
Space Launch Complex 12	Undeveloped			34°33′23″N 120°37′29″W
Space Launch Complex 15	Undeveloped			34°36′45″N 120°33′33″W

== ICBM testing sites ==
=== Active sites ===
Site	Uses
LF-03 (former 394-A2)	34°50′46″N 120°34′52″W; 394-A2 (April – December 1963), LF-03 (January 1964 – present); LGM-30 Minuteman I/II; Minotaur II testing. Originally a Minuteman 394th SMS silo, first launch in April 1963. Upgraded for use as a Launch Facility in 1964, used for Minuteman testing until July 2001. Currently modified to launch the Minotaur. 97 launches.
LF-04 (former 394-A3)	34°51′32″N 120°36′24″W; 394-A3 (September 1962 – December 1963), LF-04 (January 1964 – present); LGM-30 Minuteman I/II/III testing; first launch in September 1962.
LCC-01 (former LF-10)	34°51′39″N 120°35′00″W; LGM-30G Minuteman III, first launch in July 1987. Currently two Launch Control Centers: LCC 01-A on the left, and LCC 01-B on the right.
LF-09	34°52′43″N 120°38′01″W; LGM-30 Minuteman I/II/III testing; first launch in June 1964, Inactivated in 2006, Minuteman III launch on 26 September 2013.
LF-10 (former LF-22)	34°51′02″N 120°35′38″W; LGM-30 Minuteman I/II testing; first launch in October 1965, Inactivated in 1975, Minuteman III launch on 22 September 2013.
LF-21	34°51′39″N 120°35′44″W; LGM-30 Minuteman I/II, Ground-Based Interceptor (GBI) testing; first launch in August 1965.
LF-23	34°51′20″N 120°35′49″W; LGM-30F Minuteman II. One Minuteman launch, on 26 August 1966. Since 2003, it has been used for Ground-Based Interceptor (GBI) launches.
LF-24	34°51′24″N 120°36′08″W; LGM-30F Minuteman II testing; first launch in December 1965. Mothballed in 1971.
TP-01	34°48′15″N 120°35′20″W; LGM-118 Peacekeeper, MGM-134 Midgetman SICBM (Small Intercontinental Ballistic Missile); first launch in June 1983. It is also a candidate site for Ground-Based Interceptor (GBI) launches.

=== Inactive sites ===
Site	Uses
395-A1, 395-A2, 395-A3	34°48′23″N 120°32′39″W 395 Alpha 1 (September 1961 – December 1964) 34°48′19″N 120°32′42″W 395 Alpha 2 (March 1963 – March 1965); 34°48′23″N 120°32′42″W 395 Alpha 3 (January 1962 – January 1965); HGM-25A Titan I, 3 operational alert sites. First Titan I launch on 3 May 1961, last on 14 January 1965. Primarily used for research and development launches.
395-B	34°46′57″N 120°36′25″W; LGM-25C Titan II, This was a test and training facility, between 1964 and 1969.
395-C	34°44′02″N 120°35′47″W; LGM-25C Titan II, This was a test and training facility and was the site of the first Titan II launch at Vandenberg Air Force Base. Most usage pre-1969.
395-D	34°42′27″N 120°35′22″W; LGM-25C Titan II, This was a test and training facility, between 1963 and 1969.
Site A – 576 Alpha 1, 576 Alpha 2, 576 Alpha 3	34°46′36″N 120°36′06″W 576 Alpha 1 (October 1962 – September 1974) 34°46′51″N 120°36′00″W 576 Alpha 2 (September 1959 – August 1971); 34°46′39″N 120°35′48″W 576 Alpha 3 (January 1960 – October 1989); SM-65D Atlas These above-ground sites, with open support towers, were the first to be used for Atlas D.
Site B – 576 Baker 1, 576 Baker 2, 576 Baker 3	34°47′36″N 120°35′41″W 576 Baker 1 (July 1960 – June 1966) 34°47′27″N 120°35′30″W 576 Baker 2 (April 1960 – November 1967); 34°47′23″N 120°35′45″W 576 Baker 3 (September 1960 – October 1967); SM-65D Atlas, Site 1 was active from 22 July 1960 to 10 June 1966. Site 2 was active from 19 June 1959 to 7 November 1967. Site 3 was active from 12 September 1960 to 21 January 1965, then was used for the space program from 27 May 1965 to 11 October 1967. As of 2016, satellite images showed these sites to have been demolished.
Site C – 576 Charlie	34°48′32″N 120°35′01″W; SM-65E Atlas, built 1963. The Atlas E site was unique because it was constructed above ground, not semi-buried. Three Atlas demonstration and shakedown operations launches occurred July – September 1963 after which the site was inactivated.
Site D – 576 Delta	34°49′14″N 120°33′25″W; SM-65F Atlas, Built 1963, inactivated 1964. 2 Atlas demonstration and shakedown operations launches occurred March – August 1963 and the site was then inactivated.
Site F – 576 Foxtrot (also known as OSTF-1)	34°47′46″N 120°35′20″W; SM-65E Atlas, Operational Suitability Test Facility for Atlas E missiles. 10 Atlas research and development launches occurred between June 1961 and August 1964 and the site was then inactivated.
Site G – 576 Golf (also known as OSTF-2)	34°49′21″N 120°33′37″W; SM-65F Atlas, Operational Suitability Test Facility for Atlas F missiles. Seven Atlas research and development launches occurred August 1962 – January 1965 and the site was then inactivated.
BOM1, BOM2	34°48′02″N 120°35′57″W; Used for CIM-10 Bomarc interceptors. Two Bomarc launchers with a third support building between the two shelters. United States Navy personnel at Vandenberg launched the missiles strictly as targets with the first launch taking place on 25 August 1966. The last two launches for a Navy test program occurred on 14 July 1982. BOM1 49 launches; BOM2 38 launches.
HP-06	34°48′13″N 120°36′02″W; BGM-109 Tomahawk Ground Launched Cruise Missile; Used for one launch of a BGM-109 GCLM on 22 October 1985.
OSTF-8	34°48′15″N 120°32′46″W; HGM-25A Titan I, Operational Suitability Test Facility. An elevator failure led to the destruction of this site on 3 December 1960.
68-SLTF	34°48′25″N 120°32′57″W; LGM-25C Titan II, Silo Launch Test Facility for Titan II. Launched a Titan I on 3 May 1961. The facility was first built as a design and construction test for a mission-firing silo. Later, it became the Titan II Operations and Maintenance Missile Trainer (QMT).
LC-A	34°39′50″N 120°36′08″W formerly Launch Complex A, Naval Missile Facility, Point Arguello (PALC-A). Used for Blue Scout Jr; Nike Javelin; Honest John; Black Brant; Astrobee 1500, Nike Asp; Seagull, and Dac Roc sounding rockets from 1959 to 1966.
LC-B	34°39′26″N 120°36′16″W formerly Launch Complex B, Naval Missile Facility, Point Arguello (PALC-B). Used for Nike Viper I; Terrier Asp IV, Kiva/Hope; Deacon Arrow II; Nike Cajun, and Astrobee 1500 sounding rockets from 1960 to 1963.
LF-02 (former 394-A1)	34°50′41″N 120°35′05″W; 394-A1 (April – December 1963), LF-02 (January 1964 – July 2004); LGM-30 Minuteman I/II/III; LGM-118 Peacekeeper testing. Originally a Minuteman 394th SMS silo, first launch in April 1963. Upgraded for use as a launch facility in 1964. Used for Minuteman until July 1975. Modified for Peacekeeper use in 1986. Used for LGM-118 until July 2004. 76 launches.
LF-05 (former 394-A4)	34°51′44″N 120°36′34″W; 394-A4 (September 1962 – December 1963), LF-05 (February 1964 – March 2000); LGM-30 Minuteman I/II/III; LGM-118 Peacekeeper testing; first launch December 1962. Last Minuteman launch October 1976. Modified for use by Peacekeeper in 1989, first LGM-118 launch March 1990. Last launch March 2000.
LF-06 (former 394-A5)	34°52′58″N 120°38′09″W; 394-A5 (July – December 1963), LF-06 (February 1964 – August 2007); LGM-30 Minuteman I/II/III. First launch April 1963. Last launch August 2007. LF-06 is also a candidate site for Ground-Based Interceptor (GBI) launches.
LF-07 (former 394-A6)	34°53′09″N 120°38′01″W; 394-A6 (May – November 1963), LF-07 (January 1964 – November 1987); LGM-30 Minuteman I/II testing; first launch May 1963, last Launch November 1987.
LF-08 (former 394-A7)	34°51′02″N 120°35′54″W; 394-A7 (September 1963), LF-08 (August 1964–1994); LGM-30 Minuteman I/II/III; LGM-118 Peacekeeper testing. First launch September 1963. Last Minuteman launch in January 1984. Modified for Peacekeeper use in 1986. Used for LGM-118 until June 1991. Converted for Astrid use in 1994. Silo has been filled half way with cement and is now a Minuteman III maintenance training facility for Tech School.
LF-25	34°52′56″N 120°37′47″W; Minuteman II/III testing; first launch in February 1966, inactivated in 1976.
LF-26	34°53′18″N 120°38′12″W; Minuteman II/III testing; first launch in January 1966, inactivated in 2006.
LE-07	34°46′01″N 120°37′06″W; PGM-17 Thor Used by Royal Air Force (RAF) for 2 test launches: 6 September 1961 and 19 March 1962. Inactivated afterwards.
LE-08 (former 75-2-8)	34°45′54″N 120°36′58″W; Used by: Thor-Delta. First launch 16 April 1959, last launch 19 June 1962. Originally a Thor 75 SMS PGM-17 Thor IRBM pad 75-2-8. Used by RAF for launch training. Number of launches 7. Upgraded for use as a launch emplacement in 1961, inactivated in June 1962 after 2 RAF test launches.
PLC-C	34°36′34″N 120°37′42″W; Probe Launch Complex C, used for Aerobee-170 and TE-416 Tomahawk sounding rockets.

== See also ==
- List of Cape Canaveral and Merritt Island launch sites
