= Vandenberg Space Launch Complex 10 =

Rocket launch site at Vandenberg Space Force Base in the United States

Space Launch Complex 10
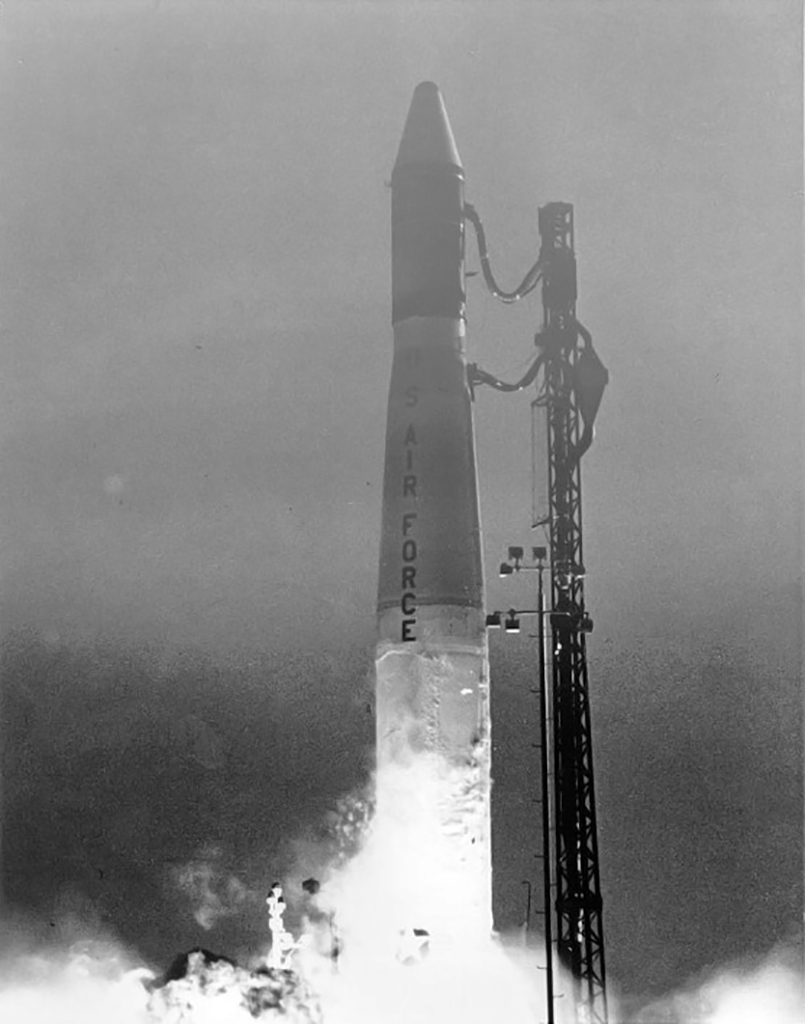
- A Thor DSV-2U carrying a DMSP weather satellite launches from SLC-10W in 1980. This was the last orbital launch from the complex.
- Interactive map of Space Launch Complex 10
- Launch site: Vandenberg Space Force Base
- Location: 34°45′55″N 120°37′20″W
- Time zone: UTC−08:00 (PST)
  - Summer (DST): UTC−07:00 (PDT)
- Short name: SLC-10
- Operator: United States Space Force
- Total launches: 38
- Launch pad: 2
- Orbital inclination range: 51° – 145°
SLC-10W launch history
- Status: Inactive
- Launches: 32
- First launch: 14 August 1959; PGM-17 Thor
- Last launch: 15 July 1980; Thor DSV-2U / DMSP-5D1 F-5
- Associated rockets: PGM-17 Thor; Thor MG-18; Thor-Burner; Thor DSV-2U
SLC-10E launch history
- Status: Inactive
- Launches: 6
- First launch: 16 June 1959; PGM-17 Thor
- Last launch: 19 March 1962; PGM-17 Thor
- Associated rockets: PGM-17 Thor
- Space Launch Complex 10
- U.S. National Register of Historic Places
- U.S. National Historic Landmark
- Location within California Location within the United States
- Location: Vandenberg Space Force Base, Lompoc, California
- Coordinates: 34°45′55″N 120°37′20″W
- NRHP reference No.: 86003511

Significant dates
- Added to NRHP: June 23, 1986
- Designated NHL: June 23, 1986

Launch sites at Vandenberg Space Force Base
Active pads
Active pads not used for launches
Inactive leased pads
Inactive unleased pads
1 SLC-1E
2 SLC-1W
3 SLC-2E
4 SLC-2W
5 SLC-10E
6 SLC-10W
7 LC-576E
8 SLC-9
9 SLC-3E
10 SLC-3W
11 SLC-4E
12 SLC-4W (LZ-4)
13 SLC-5
14 SLC-6
15 SLC-8
16 SLC-7
17 SLC-11
18 SLC-12
19 SLC-14
20 SLC-15

Space Launch Complex 10 (SLC-10), or Missile Launch Complex 10, is located on Vandenberg Space Force Base in Lompoc, California. It was built in 1958 to test ballistic missiles and developed into a space launching facility in 1963. Prior to 1966, Space Launch Complex 10W (SLC-10W) was known as Vandenberg AFB Pad 75–2–6. It remains a rare pristine look at the electronics and facilities created in that era that helped the United States grow its space capabilities.

The last launch from this complex was a Thor booster in 1980. It was declared a National Historic Landmark in 1986.

It is undergoing an eight-year restoration, and public visits are possible, if arranged in advance.

== History ==
The launch complex was built in 1958 by the Douglas Aircraft Corporation, and was first designated Complex 75–2. At that time it consisted of three launch pads, which were used to train military operators of PGM-17 Thor ballistic missiles, and to conduct missile launch tests. The first launches were conducted by the British Royal Air Force in June and August 1959. The facilities at SLC-10 were dismantled and transported to Johnston Island in support of Operation Dominic, a nuclear weapons testing project conducted there in 1962.

The launch complex was rebuilt in 1963 to support the development of Burner rockets, with two launch pads, designated SLC-10E and SLC-10W. Tests were conducted at SLC-10W from 1965 to 1980, using the Thor satellite launch vehicles, the first stages of which followed the design of the Thor missile.

== Surviving elements ==
Two launch pads and a prefabricated launch blockhouse are the principal surviving elements of the complex. The blockhouse interior still includes all of the electrical equipment used in later launches. SLC-10W also includes pipes and storage facilities for storing and managing the liquid fuel used in the rockets.

== Launch history ==
=== SLC-10W ===
- Thor
- Thor-Burner
- Thor DSV-2U
