= Vandenberg Space Launch Complex 5 =

Rocket launch site at Vandenberg Space Force Base in the United States

Space Launch Complex 5
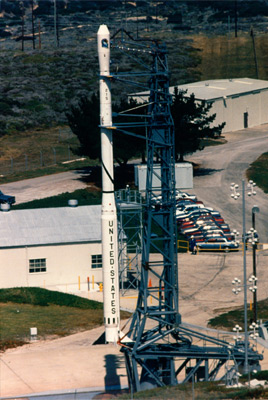
- SLC-5 in 1992, holding a Scout G-1 carrying SAMPEX
- Interactive map of Space Launch Complex 5
- Launch site: Vandenberg Space Force Base
- Location: 34.6080°N 120.6247°W
- Time zone: UTC−08:00 (PST)
  - Summer (DST): UTC−07:00 (PDT)
- Short name: SLC-5
- Operator: United States Space Force (owner); Phantom Space (tenant)
- Launch pad: 1
- Orbital inclination range: 51° – 145°
Launch history
- Status: Inactive
- Launches: 69
- First launch: 26 April 1962; Scout X-2 / Solrad 4B
- Last launch: 9 May 1994; Scout G-1 / MSTI-2
- Associated rockets: Future: Daytona; Retired: Scout

Launch sites at Vandenberg Space Force Base
Active pads
Active pads not used for launches
Inactive leased pads
Inactive unleased pads
1 SLC-1E
2 SLC-1W
3 SLC-2E
4 SLC-2W
5 SLC-10E
6 SLC-10W
7 LC-576E
8 SLC-9
9 SLC-3E
10 SLC-3W
11 SLC-4E
12 SLC-4W (LZ-4)
13 SLC-5
14 SLC-6
15 SLC-8
16 SLC-7
17 SLC-11
18 SLC-12
19 SLC-14
20 SLC-15

Space Launch Complex 5 (SLC-5) is a decommissioned launch pad at Vandenberg Space Force Base in California, United States. Initially constructed as Launch Complex D (LC-D) in 1961, the facility was used by the Scout family of launch vehicles from 1962 to 1994, carrying a variety of payloads for agencies like NASA, the United States Navy, and the United States Air Force.

Currently, the pad is leased to Phantom Space Corporation for future use by their Daytona line of launch vehicles.

== History ==
=== Scout (1962–1994) ===
Space Launch Complex 5 started its life as Launch Complex D (LC-D), initially constructed by the United States Navy in 1961 as part of an expansion of rocketry activities around the Point Arguello area. It was designed to be part of Point Arguello Naval Air Station, which had been established two years earlier as a separate facility for Western Range launches, operating alongside the United States Air Force presence at Vandenberg Air Force Base. LC-D was one of six facilities at the naval base, alongside LC-A, LC-B, and LC-C as sounding rocket pads, as well as LC-1 (modern SLC-3E and W) and LC-2 (modern SLC-4E and W) for use by the SM-65 Atlas and its derivatives. For LC-D specifically, it was designed in mind as a polar orbit launch site for the Scout rocket family, which was already being launched form Launch Area 3 (LA-3) at Wallops Island and Launch Complex 18 (LC-18) at Cape Canaveral.

The first launch from LC-D came on 26 April 1962, when a Scout X-2 launched SOLRAD 4B for the Naval Research Laboratory. It was the only probe in the SOLRAD series to launch from California; however, a failure in the fourth stage led to it failing to achieve orbit. It hosted its first civilian launch on 19 December 1963, carrying Explorer 19 for NASA. In 1964, LC-D would be renamed to SLC-5 after Point Arguello Naval Air Station was merged into Vandenberg Air Force Base.

Throughout the early years of the pad's history, numerous payloads would launch from there on Scouts, such as the Transit satellites for the Navy, OV3 probes for the Air Force, and various members of the Explorer Program for NASA. Additionally, it would host various international payloads for nations such as the United Kingdom, France, West Germany, and the Netherlands throughout the 1960s and 1970s.

Throughout the late 1970s and early 1980s, launches from SLC-5 became more scarce, as NASA and the Department of Defense were planning on retiring Scout and other conventional launchers in favor of the Space Shuttle. The philosophy was that rather than using an expendable launch vehicle that could only place several hundred kilograms into orbit, one could instead launch them on a rideshare from a reusable shuttle launched from Space Launch Complex 6 (SLC-6). As a result, there were no years between 1976 and 1988 where more than one Scout launch was made from SLC-5. Winds briefly changed for the pad following the Vandenberg Shuttle program's cancellation in the wake of the Space Shuttle Challenger disaster in 1986, helping lead to three Scout launches from SLC-5 occurring in 1988.

In the early 1990s, the Scout program was starting to wind down, with SLC-5 being the only active pad following the last flight from LA-3 in 1985 and from San Marco in 1988. This was thanks to several reasons such as age of the family, as well the advent of rockets such as Pegasus and Delta II during this period. Despite this, there were still some notable payloads that launched from the complex, most notably 1992's launch of SAMPEX for NASA. Overall, there were 69 flights to come out of SLC-5 during its Scout era, with the last one occurring on 9 May 1994 carrying MSTI-2 for the Strategic Defense Initiative. This was also the last flight of the Scout before its retirement; following this, the pad was deactivated.

=== Dormancy and Phantom Space (1994–present) ===
In the years following decommissioning, SLC-5 has sat dormant. The Scout-era pad infrastructure stood until approximately 2009, when it was demolished to likely prevent any hazards with seaside rusting, similarly to what happened to Missile Row in Cape Canaveral. Following this, the pad spent the 2010s as a brownfield, remaining untouched by any of the Vandenberg personnel.

In 2023, documents from the California Coastal Commission showed that the United States Space Force had leased SLC-5 to Phantom Space Corporation for use by their Daytona family of rockets. The following June, the Space Force released a finding of no significant impact (FONSI) to the work plans to be done at the pad. These proposals call for the creation of two small pads at SLC-5, similar in style to what can be seen at SLC-2, SLC-3, and SLC-4, as well as the construction of a horizontal integration facility. The maiden launch of the Daytona is slated for Q4 of 2025; however, as of February 2025, no construction has started at the complex.

== Launch history ==
- Scout
- Daytona

== Sources ==
- Wade, Mark. "Vandenberg SLC5". Encyclopedia Astronautica. Archived from the original on 10 September 2003.
