= Vandenberg Space Launch Complex 1 =

Rocket launch site at Vandenberg Space Force Base in the USA

Coordinates: 34.757171°N 120.627796°W

Space Launch Complex 1
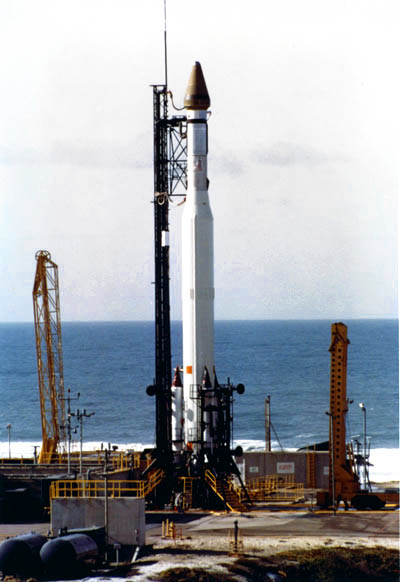
- Thorad-Agena at SLC-1W in December 1971, carrying various Poppy satellites
- Launch site: Vandenberg Space Force Base
- Time zone: UTC−08:00 (PST)
  - Summer (DST): UTC−07:00 (PDT)
- Short name: SLC-1
- Operator: United States Space Force
- Total launches: 101
- Launch pad(s): 2
SLC-1W launch history
- Status: Inactive
- Launches: 56
- First launch: 21 January 1959; Thor-Agena A
- Last launch: 14 December 1971; Thorad SLV-2G Agena D / OPS 7898
- Associated rockets: Thor-Agena; Thorad-Agena
SLC-1E launch history
- Status: Inactive
- Launches: 45
- First launch: 25 June 1959; Thor-Agena A / Discoverer 4
- Last launch: 18 September 1968; Thorad SLV-2G Agena D / OPS 8595 KH-4
- Associated rockets: Thor-Agena; Thorad-Agena

Launch sites at Vandenberg Space Force Base
Active pads
Active pads not used for launches
Inactive leased pads
Inactive unleased pads
1 SLC-1E
2 SLC-1W
3 SLC-2E
4 SLC-2W
5 SLC-10E
6 SLC-10W
7 LC-576E
8 SLC-9
9 SLC-3E
10 SLC-3W
11 SLC-4E
12 SLC-4W (LZ-4)
13 SLC-5
14 SLC-6
15 SLC-8
16 SLC-7
17 SLC-11
18 SLC-12
19 SLC-14
20 SLC-15

Space Launch Complex 1 (SLC-1) is an inactive launch complex at Vandenberg Space Force Base in California. It consists of two pads, SLC-1E (formerly Pad 75-3-5) and SLC-1W (formerly Pad 75-3-4). Both sites were built in 1958 for the never activated 75th Strategic Missile Squadron for launches of the Thor-Agena to support the CORONA series of reconnaissance satellites for the CIA. Under the masquerade of the Discoverer program, SLC-1 served as the launch site of numerous firsts for spaceflight, such as the first satellite in polar orbit with Discoverer 2, the first recovery of an object from orbit with Discoverer 13, and the first recovery of film from orbit with Discoverer 14. SLC-1 continued to launch various spy satellites such as the KH-4 for the Department of Defense throughout the 1960s, following the transfer of vehicle operations from the CIA to the National Reconnaissance Office. During the mid-60s, as part of the phasing out of the Thor-Agena, both pads were modified to launch the succeeding Thorad-Agena throughout the end of the decade. Ultimately, thanks to the KH-4 getting replaced by the larger KH-9 and KH-11 as well as the pads' proximity to the more actively used Space Launch Complex 2, SLC-1 eventually saw the end of active service by the 1970s, and have since been disused.

== Launch statistics ==
=== SLC-1W ===
- Thor-Agena
- Thorad-Agena

=== SLC-1E ===
- Thor-Agena
- Thorad-Agena
