= Vandenberg Space Launch Complex 14 =

Planned rocket launch pad at Vandenberg Space Force Base

Space Launch Complex 14
- Interactive map of Space Launch Complex 14
- Launch site: Vandenberg Space Force Base
- Location: 34°33′30″N 120°34′47″W
- Time zone: UTC−08:00 (PST)
  - Summer (DST): UTC−07:00 (PDT)
- Short name: SLC-14
- Operator: United States Space Force (owner); Blue Origin (tenant)
- Orbital inclination range: 51° – 145°
SLC-14 launch history
- Status: Undeveloped, awaiting construction for Blue Origin
- Launches: 0
- Associated rockets: Future: New Glenn

Launch sites at Vandenberg Space Force Base
Active pads
Active pads not used for launches
Inactive leased pads
Inactive unleased pads
1 SLC-1E
2 SLC-1W
3 SLC-2E
4 SLC-2W
5 SLC-10E
6 SLC-10W
7 LC-576E
8 SLC-9
9 SLC-3E
10 SLC-3W
11 SLC-4E
12 SLC-4W (LZ-4)
13 SLC-5
14 SLC-6
15 SLC-8
16 SLC-7
17 SLC-11
18 SLC-12
19 SLC-14
20 SLC-15

Space Launch Complex 14 (SLC-14) is a planned launch pad at Vandenberg Space Force Base in California, United States. As of 2026 it is undeveloped but is leased to Blue Origin for future use in the support of New Glenn launches.

== History ==
Space Launch Complex 14 first saw its origins in the early 2020s, when Blue Origin looked into leasing a launch site at Vandenberg in order to give New Glenn, which was still in development at the time, the ability to launch into polar orbit and Sun-synchronous orbit. They initially had their eyes focused on Space Launch Complex 6 (SLC-6), historically intended to launch the Manned Orbiting Laboratory and the Space Shuttle for the United States Air Force, which was in the process of deactivation thanks to United Launch Alliance's 2022 retirement of the Delta IV and Delta IV Heavy from the Western Range. However, any proposal was cancelled in April 2023, when the United States Space Force leased SLC-6 to SpaceX as a second West Coast launch site for Falcon 9 (joining SLC-4E) with the option to support Falcon Heavy launches.

Sometime later in the year, documents written by the Space Force and California Coastal Commission reported that Blue Origin planned to construct an entirely new launch pad for New Glenn at Vandenberg named Space Launch Complex 9 (SLC-9), located in the Lompoc Terrace area nearby Space Launch Complex 3. However, a spokesperson for Space Launch Delta 30 (SLD 30) clarified in December 2025 that the company did not possess any grant or lease at that time.

On December 29, 2025, SLD 30 announced a request for information regarding interest to develop SLC-14 as a pad for use by super heavy-lift launch vehicles. This decision was part of a wider-scale expansion of launch pad operations at the base by the Space Force, as most existing pads were either already leased or were too close to one being used. The Space Force officially selected Blue Origin for the lease on April 14, 2026, with SLD 30 commander Col. James Horne III elaborating that SLC-14 could see its maiden launch in 2028 assuming no issues occur.

As per updated policy by the Space and Missile Systems Center, Blue Origin will be required to use their own equipment during the construction of SLC-14. As of April 2026, construction of the complex has not yet commenced.

== See also ==
- Launch Complex 36
- Launch Complex 11
- Launch Complex 12
