= Vandenberg Space Launch Complex 6 =

Launch pad

Space Launch Complex 6
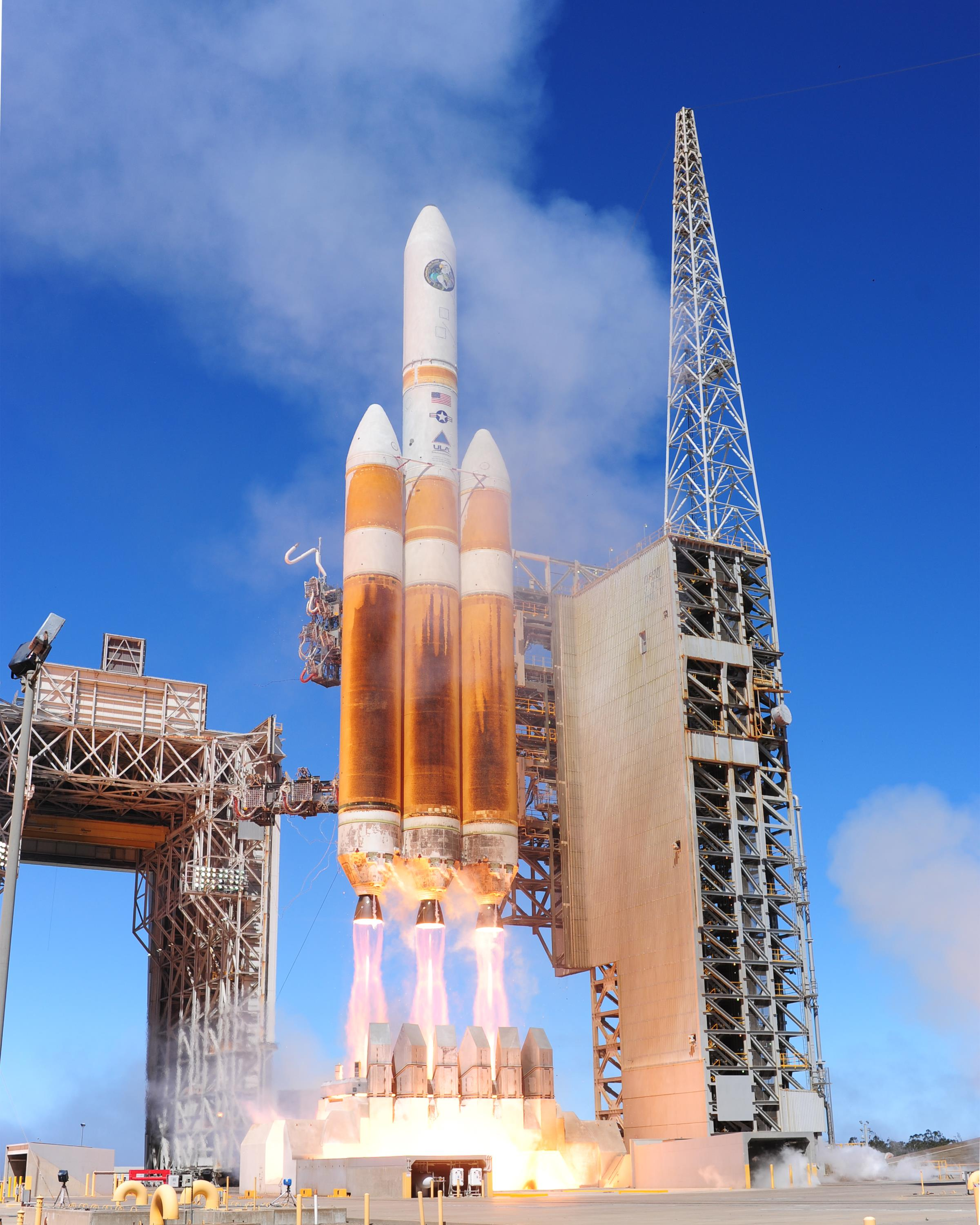
- Delta IV Heavy lifts off from SLC-6 in August 2013
- Interactive map of Space Launch Complex 6
- Launch site: Vandenberg Space Force Base
- Location: 34°34′53″N 120°37′36″W
- Time zone: UTC−08:00 (PST)
  - Summer (DST): UTC−07:00 (PDT)
- Short name: SLC-6
- Operator: United States Space Force (owner); SpaceX (tenant)
- Launch pad: 3 (includes 2 landing pads)
- Orbital inclination range: 55–145°
Launch history
- Status: Inactive, pending modifications for SpaceX
- Launches: 19
- First launch: 15 August 1995; Athena I (GemStar-1)
- Last launch: 24 September 2022; Delta IV Heavy (NROL-91)
- Associated rockets: Future: Falcon 9, Falcon Heavy; Retired: Athena I, Athena II, Delta IV, Delta IV Heavy; Plans cancelled: Titan IIIC, Titan IIIM, Space Shuttle, Titan IV, OmegA
LZ-x landing history
- Status: Planned
- Associated rockets: Future: Falcon 9, Falcon Heavy
LZ-x landing history
- Status: Planned
- Associated rockets: Future: Falcon 9, Falcon Heavy

Vandenberg Space Launch Complex 6 (SLC-6, pronounced "Slick Six") is a launch pad and associated support infrastructure at Vandenberg Space Force Base in California. Construction at the site began in 1966, but the first launch did not occur until 1995 due to program cancellations and subsequent repurposing efforts.

The site was originally envisioned to support Titan IIIM rockets and the Manned Orbiting Laboratory. However, these projects were terminated before SLC-6's completion. Between 1979 and 1986 the facilities received extensive modifications to accommodate the Space Shuttle. However, budgetary constraints, safety considerations, and political factors ultimately led to the cancellation of Shuttle operations from the West Coast before they started.

SLC-6 facilitated four launches of Athena rockets between 1995 and 1999 with minimal modifications. Subsequently, it underwent modifications to support the Delta IV and Delta IV Heavy, which conducted ten successful missions between 2006 and 2022. In 2023, SpaceX secured a lease agreement for SLC-6, with plans to modify the facility and add two landing pads for Falcon 9 and Falcon Heavy launches commencing in 2027.

Vandenberg's southward launch trajectory is advantageous for deploying satellites into high-inclination polar and Sun-synchronous orbits, needed for weather forecasting, Earth observation, and reconnaissance missions as they enable comprehensive and regular global coverage. Launching into such orbits from the East Coast of the United States presents significant challenges due to geographical constraints.

== History ==
SLC-6, part of Vandenberg's "South Base," was originally part of the Sudden Ranch, prior to its purchase by the U.S. Air Force in the mid-1960s under the law of eminent domain. In addition to the ranch, the Point Arguello Light was based there, which in 1967 was replaced by an automated light. There was also the Point Arguello LORAN station, de-established 31 December 1979.

=== Titan (1966–1969) ===
No Titans were launched from SLC-6. After purchase of south base, the Air Force started construction of the SLC-6 facility on 12 March 1966, to support launches of a Titan IIIM for the Manned Orbiting Laboratory (MOL). After significant construction work was completed, the MOL program was cancelled on 10 June 1969, so further work on SLC-6 stopped as the facility was placed in mothball status.

=== Space Shuttle (1972–1989) ===
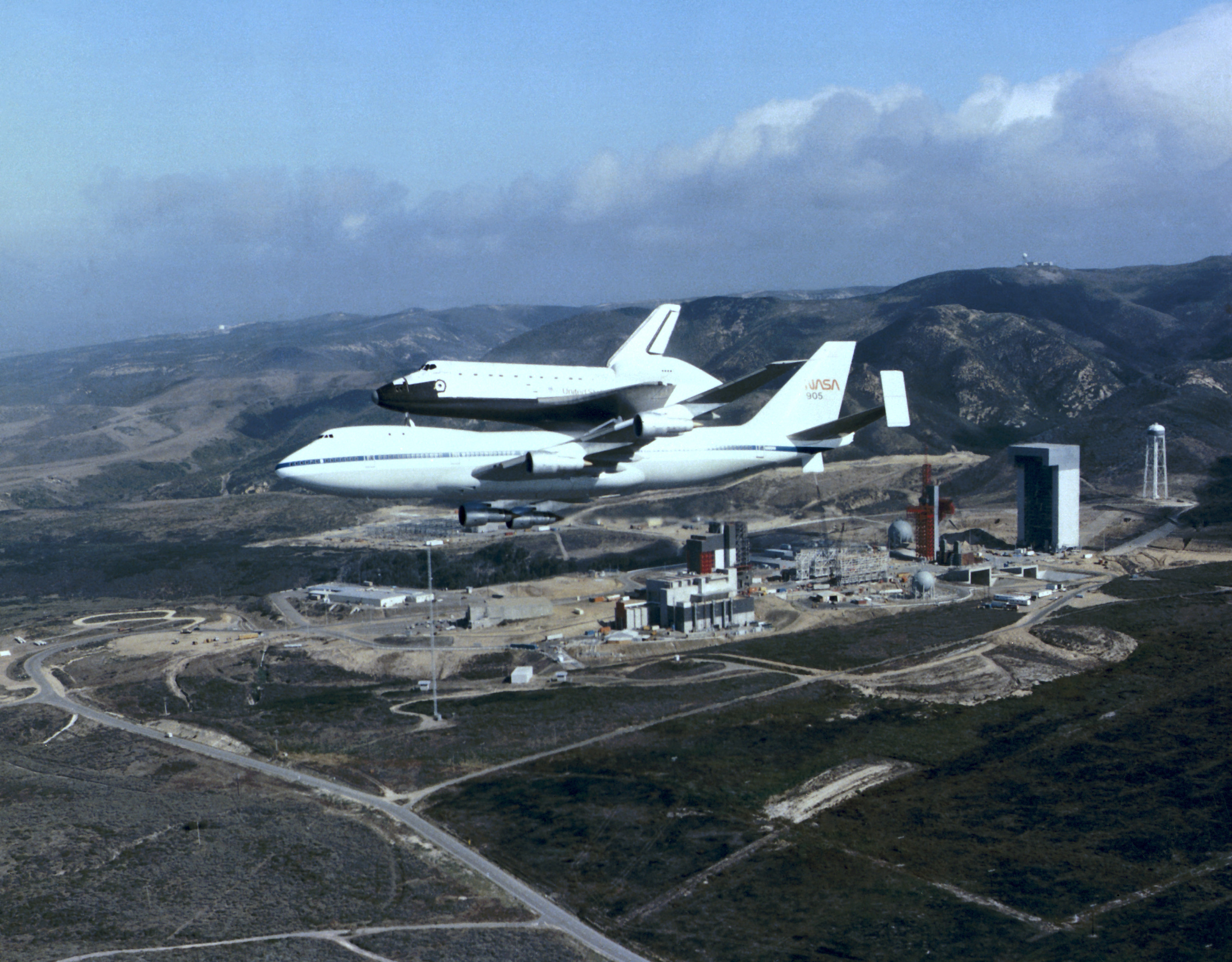
Space Shuttle Discovery atop Shuttle Carrier Aircraft 905, flies over SLC-6 in November 1984, before being used to test infrastructure at the base

No Space shuttles were launched from SLC-6. With plans of launching civilian and military equatorial space shuttle flights from Kennedy Space Center (KSC) and military polar orbit flights from Vandenberg, NASA and the Air Force looked at different sites for launching the shuttle, finally deciding upon SLC-6, due to its dedicated crewed spaceflight role that was left over from the canceled MOL/Titan program.

In 1972, Vandenberg AFB was chosen as the western launch site for Air Force shuttle launches. Use of SLC-6 was approved in 1975, and re-construction of the former MOL launch facility occurred between January 1979 and July 1986 as SLC-6 was rebuilt to accommodate the space shuttle.

There were several reasons for using SLC-6:

- Florida shuttle launches to polar orbit would have entailed a large payload penalty;
- Florida shuttle launches to polar orbit would necessitate overflying South Carolina, and the discarded external tank would overfly Canada and Russia.
- Use of the existing and partially constructed Titan III facilities at SLC-6 would reduce building costs for the shuttle launch complex.

A Senate report summarized: "The Air Force originally justified the expenditure of such SLC-6 funding on the basis of a need to launch high-priority military payloads into polar orbits. After Defense Department officials testified that polar orbits could not be achieved by launching from Kennedy Space Center in Florida, the Congress initiated construction of ... SLC-6."

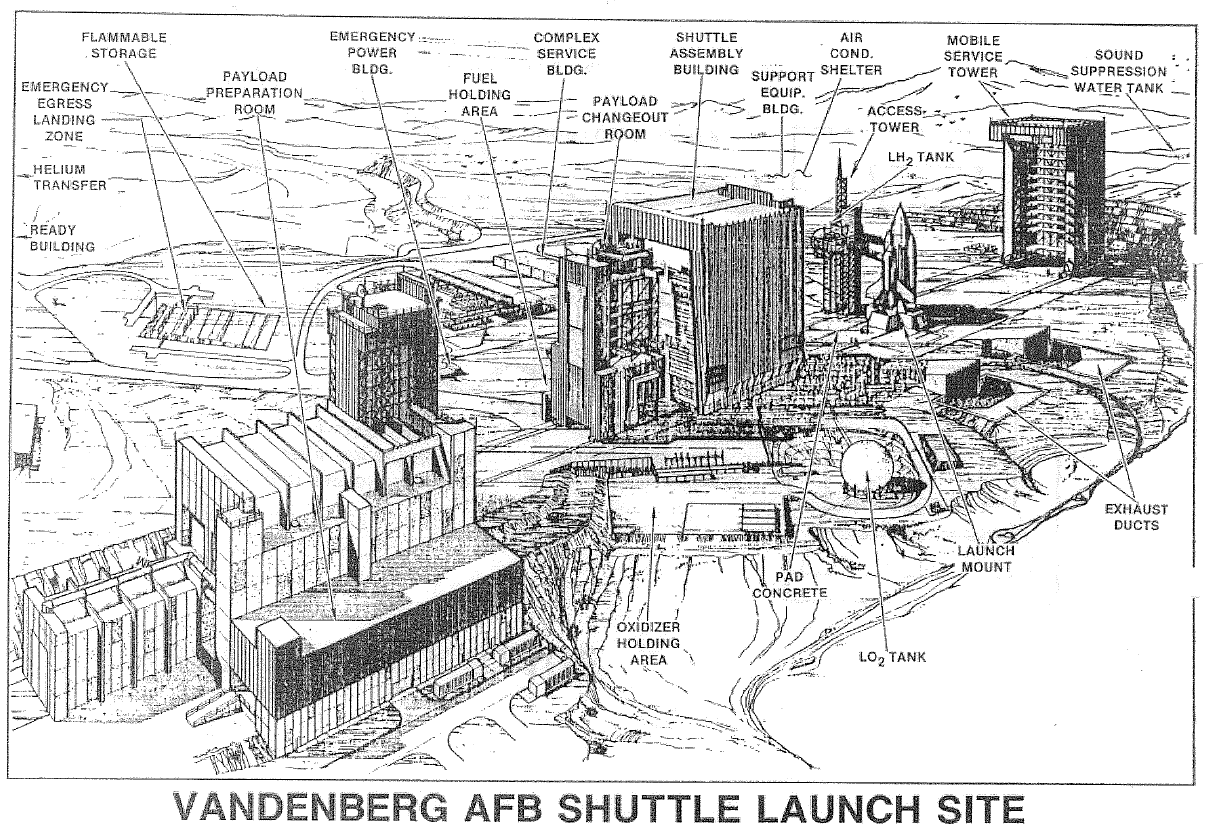
SLC-6 site layout in shuttle launch configuration

There were significant layout differences between the shuttle launch complexes at KSC and SLC-6 at Vandenberg, with the facilities at KSC closer together, but with stacking operations taking place right at the launch pad at SLC-6

At KSC, the Shuttle arrived at the Shuttle Landing Facility airport either by gliding in from space or piggybacking on the Shuttle Carrier Aircraft and then being unloaded using the Mate-Demate Device. From there, it was towed a short distance to one of three Orbiter Processing Facility hangars where it was refurbished. When the orbiter was ready, it was towed across the road to the Vehicle Assembly Building where it was stacked atop a mobile launcher platform. From there, the vehicle was taken to one of two pads at Launch Complex 39 about a mile away by a crawler-transporter. At the launch pad, the Rotating Service Structure allowed payloads to be loaded into the cargo bay on the pad.

At SLC-6, the existing 5,500-foot (1,700 m) runway at the North Base was expanded to match the Shuttle Landing Facility in Florida: 15,000 feet (4,600 m) in length with additional 1,000-foot (300 m) overruns on both ends to accommodate end-of-mission landings. Just off the runway, was the Orbiter Lifting Fixture, a scaled-down version of the Mate-Demate Device, and the Orbiter Maintenance and Processing Facility (OMPF) where the Shuttle would be refurbished. When the orbiter was ready, the Orbiter Transport System, a 76-wheel transporter would have been used to transport the shuttle between the North Base facilities and SLC-6 over 17 miles (27 km) of base and public roadways. The route through the hills around the base required that hills be carved away along 2 miles (3.2 km) of the route to accommodate the orbiter’s wingspan. At the launch pad, two buildings, the Shuttle Assembly Building and the Mobile Service Tower would envelop the access tower allowing the spacecraft to be stacked right on the launch pad.

In all, over $4 billion were spent on the modifying SLC-6 for the Space Shuttle. The original Mobile Service Tower (MST) was lowered in height and two new flame ducts were added for the shuttle's solid rocket boosters. Additional modifications or improvements included liquid hydrogen and liquid oxygen storage tanks, a payload preparation room, payload changeout room, a new launch tower with escape system for the shuttle crew members, sound suppression system and water reclamation area and a Shuttle Assembly Building were added to the original complex.

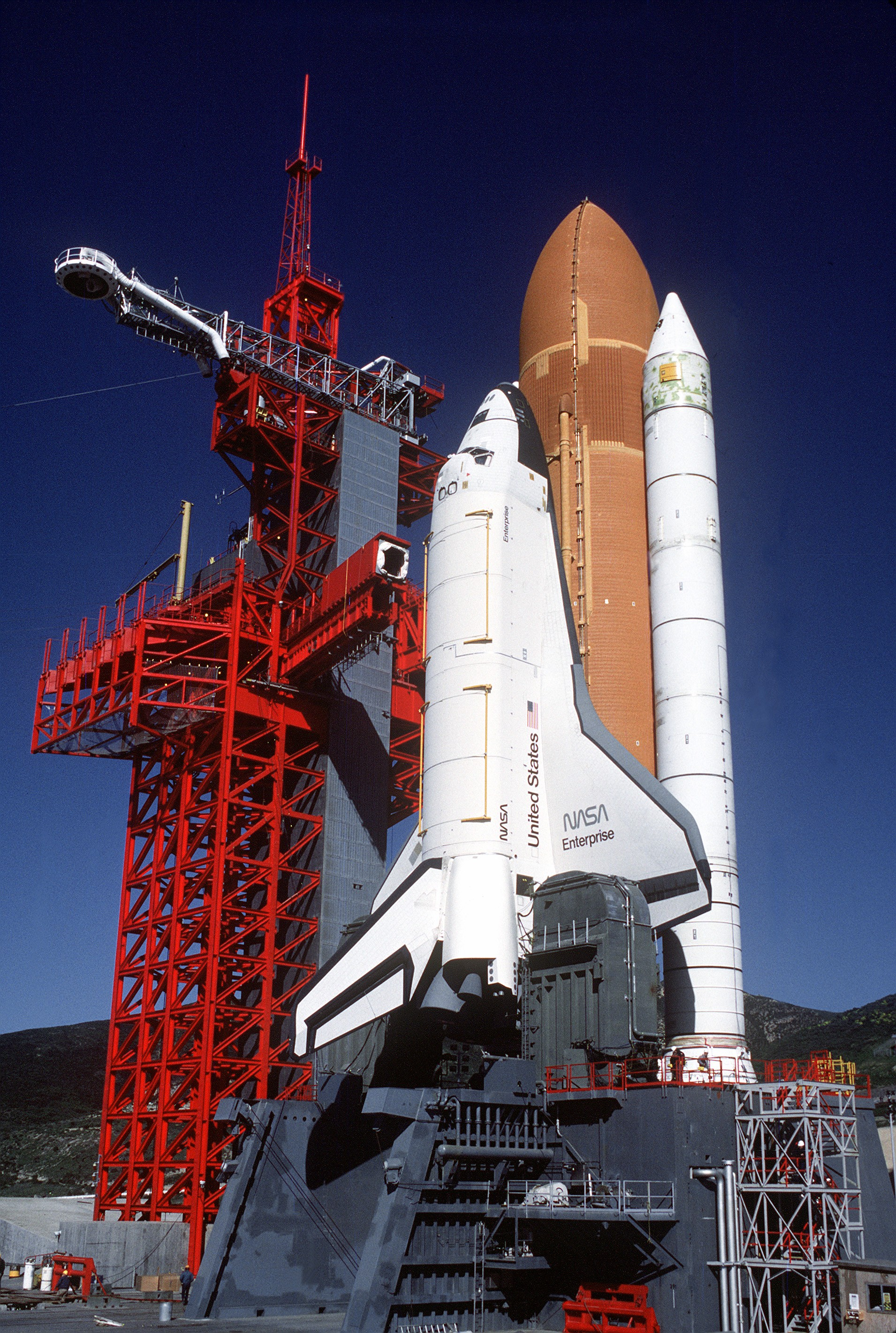
Space Shuttle Enterprise at SLC-6 in February 1985

Between November 1984 and May 1985, the Space Shuttle Enterprise was mated with External Tank and SRBs in boilerplate configuration for a series of fit checks like those conducted at LC-39. SLC-6 was declared operational during acceptance ceremonies held on 15 October 1985. However, much additional work and testing was still required.

The inaugural polar-orbit flight, designated STS-62-A and using Space Shuttle Discovery with Shuttle veteran Robert Crippen as commander, was planned for 15 October 1986. However, the Challenger disaster of 28 January 1986 grounded the Shuttle fleet as efforts were concentrated on recovery and returning the program to flight after a two-year hiatus.

On 31 July 1986, Secretary of the Air Force Edward C. Aldridge, Jr., announced that Vandenberg's Space Shuttle program would be placed in "operational caretaker status", six months after the Space Shuttle Challenger accident. A few months later, however, SLC-6 was placed in "minimum caretaker status" on 20 February 1987.

Eventually, on 13 May 1988, Secretary Aldridge then directed the Air Force to transfer Space Shuttle assets at Vandenberg to other organizations (specifically, the Kennedy Space Center) by 30 September 1989, the end of the fiscal year. The work was completed 10 days early on 20 September, when SLC-6 was placed in mothball status.

Several factors accounted for this:

- The Challenger disaster made it clear that sole dependency on the shuttle was unwise
- SLC-6 would have generated more contaminated waste water than originally envisioned, necessitating an expensive treatment plant
- Further study showed more sound suppression water would have been needed, requiring upgraded water supply facilities
- Vehicle icing (which contributed to the Challenger disaster) would have been more problematic than in Florida, and it was unclear how well SLC-6 facilities would handle that
- Blast protection of nearby occupied buildings was unsatisfactory and more construction would have been required to safeguard them
- Post-Challenger, the more confined SLC-6 launch area raised concerns of entrapped gaseous hydrogen causing a fire or explosion
- Large construction cost overruns
- Independent audits found significant construction quality problems that would have been expensive to fix

The Air Force officially terminated the Space Shuttle program at Vandenberg on 26 December 1989. The estimated cost for the discontinued program was $4 billion.

The Orbiter Lifting Fixture was relocated to United States Air Force Plant 42 where the orbiters were built and refurbished in Palmdale, California, before the delivery of the Space Shuttle Endeavour in 1991. Previously, the orbiters were trucked to Armstrong Flight Research Center at Edwards Air Force Base, about 36 miles (58 km) away, which took about 10 hours. The Orbiter Lifting Fixture was dismantled in 2008.

The Orbiter Transport System was sent to KSC where it was used to move orbiters between the Orbiter Processing Facility and the Vehicle Assembly Building. The vehicle was purchased by SpaceX in 2014 for $37,075.

=== Titan IV (1990–1991) ===
No Titan IV were launched from SLC-6. On 6 July 1990, Lockheed Space Operations Company (LSOC) was awarded an Air Force ground system contract to modify SLC-6 into a Titan IV/Centaur launch complex—essentially an uprated facility from the original MOL program that would have launched a Titan III vehicle. Site work was scheduled to begin in late-FY 1992 with a planned initial launch capability sometime in FY1996.

However, on 22 March 1991, HQ USAF reversed itself again by announcing the termination of the Titan IV/Centaur program at SLC-6. The reasons given for the project being canceled was due to "insufficient Titan IV launch requirements from the West Coast to support the construction of a new launch pad." The contract with LSOC was closed out several months later. Instead, USAF continued flying military polar orbit satellites using the Titan 34D and later Titan IV rockets from SLC-4E at Vandenberg.

=== Athena (1994–1999) ===
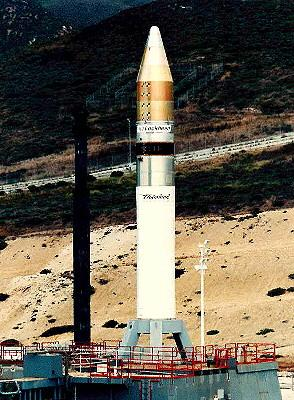
Athena 1 sits atop a "milkstool" platform at SLC-6, August 1997.

Four Athena missions flew from SLC-6, from 1995 to 1999. In the early 1990s, Lockheed Missiles and Space Company began studies on the prospect of a new family of small launch vehicles for commercial and other users. Lockheed eventually approved the development of the Lockheed Launch Vehicle (LLV) program in January 1993. After the merger of Lockheed with Martin Marietta, it was renamed Athena.

After another contract was issued in 1994 by the Air Force, modification work began on the existing SLC-6 shuttle launch mount for a small "milkstool" platform to be located over one of the two exhaust ducts originally intended for one of the large solid rocket boosters. The first operational launch from SLC-6 occurred on 15 August 1995, involving the Lockheed-Martin Launch Vehicle I (LMLV-1). Unfortunately, LMLV-1 was terminated in mid-flight after uncontrolled oscillations of the rocket were detected. This resulted in the loss of the vehicle and the payload. The cause of the mishap was later determined to be a guidance system failure coupled with overheating of the booster's first stage steering mechanism. The payload on board was GEMstar 1, a small communications satellite manufactured by CTA, Inc. for the Volunteers in Technical Assistance (VITA), a non-profit organization.

After some hardware redesign and testing, a newly rechristened Athena I successfully launched NASA's Lewis satellite into orbit from SLC-6 on 22 August 1997. Part of NASA's Small Spacecraft Technology Initiative (SSTI) and "Mission to Planet Earth" program.

Another launch, on 24 September 1999, was successful as an Ikonos satellite operated by Space Imaging (later acquired by ORBIMAGE to form GeoEye) was successfully placed into a polar orbit using an Athena 2 booster.

=== Delta IV (1999–2022) ===
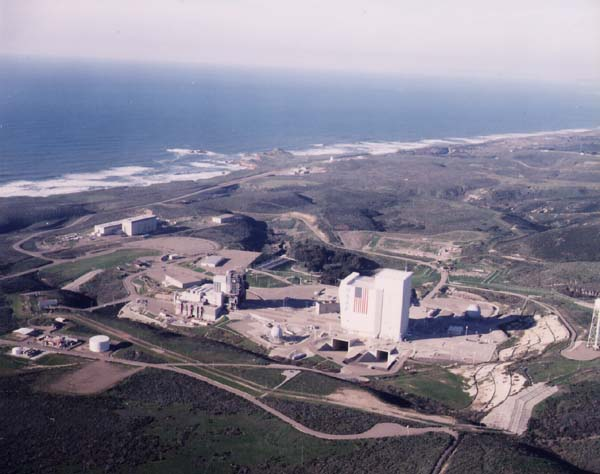
Aerial view of SLC-6 circa 2006.

Ten Delta IV rockets were launched from SLC-6. With the advent of the Delta IV in the late 1990s, The Boeing Company received a lease from the Air Force on 1 September 1999, to modify SLC-6 once again to launch Boeing's Delta IV.

Some of the Shuttle-specific components at SLC-6 were removed, such as the mobile Payload Changeout Room, but the Assembly Building, Mobile Service Tower, Launch Tower, flame deflection trenches and sound suppression system and some other shuttle-oriented equipment were retained and made compatible for the new Delta IV rocket. The launch vehicle's Common Booster Core and associated flight hardware was transported from the Boeing factory in Decatur, Ala., to Vandenberg aboard the MV Delta Mariner cargo vessel that docked just south of SLC-6 at the same location originally constructed for receiving and offloading space shuttle external tanks.

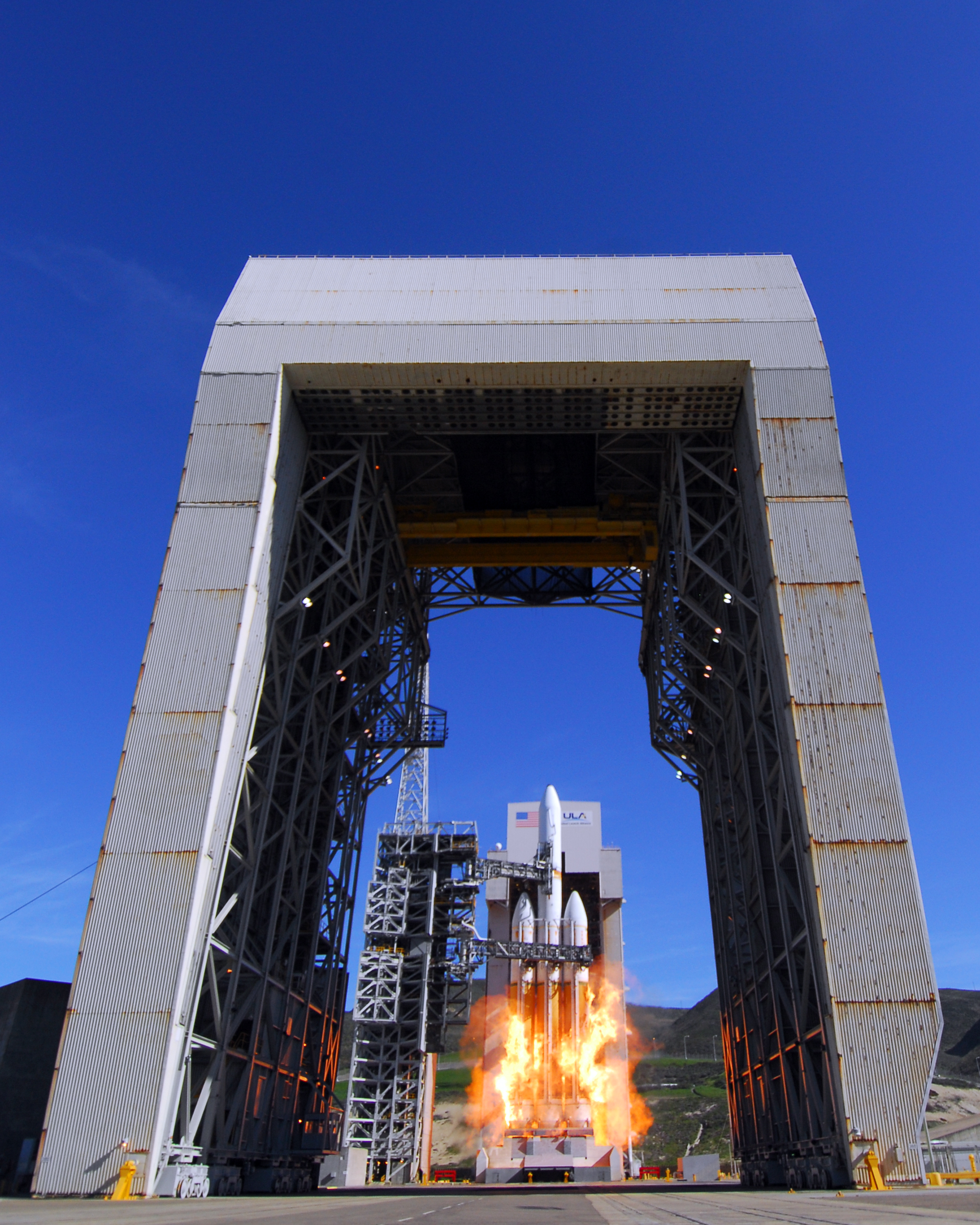
Delta IV Heavy launch from SLC-6 with USA-224

Boeing developed the Delta IV class of vehicles as its entrant in the Department of Defense's Evolved Expendable Launch Vehicle (EELV) program. EELV was intended to cut launch costs and simplify satellite launch processes.

After sitting on the pad since late-2003 and enduring technical issues with both the booster and the payload, the first of the Delta IV launch vehicles to fly from SLC-6 successfully lifted off at 8:33 p.m. PDT on 27 June 2006.

The Delta IV Medium+ (4,2) rocket lofted NROL-22, a classified satellite for the National Reconnaissance Office, into orbit. The payload was successfully deployed approximately 54 minutes later. According to a post-launch Boeing News press release, the mission was the first for the NRO aboard a Delta IV and the second aboard a Delta rocket.

Another Delta IV Medium vehicle flew a mission for the Air Force Defense Meteorological Satellite Program, orbiting DMSP-17, on 4 November 2006.

The Delta IV and the lease on SLC-6 were turned over to United Launch Alliance (ULA) when ULA was formed as a joint venture of Boeing and Lockheed Martin Space in December 2006.

On 20 January 2011, at 1:10 p.m. PST, USA-224 (NROL-49) was launched atop a Delta IV Heavy rocket. The launch was conducted by ULA and was the first flight of a Delta IV Heavy from Vandenberg.

On 24 September 2022, ULA launched the last Delta IV Heavy from the pad, concluding their use of SLC-6. Vulcan Centaur, Delta IV Heavy's successor, will launch from the Atlas V's old pad of SLC-3E at Vandenberg.

=== SpaceX (from 2023) ===
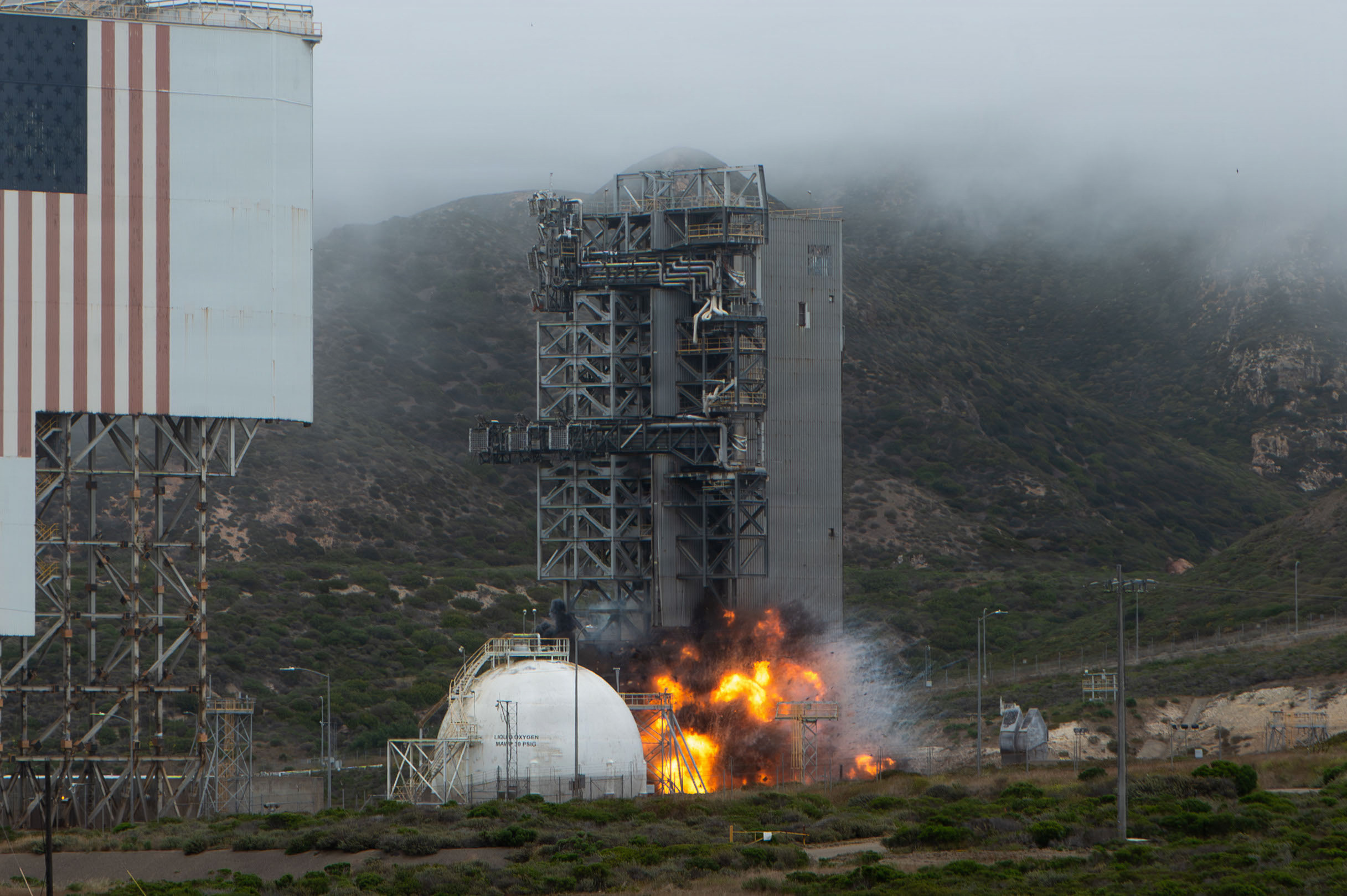
Controlled demolition of SLC-6

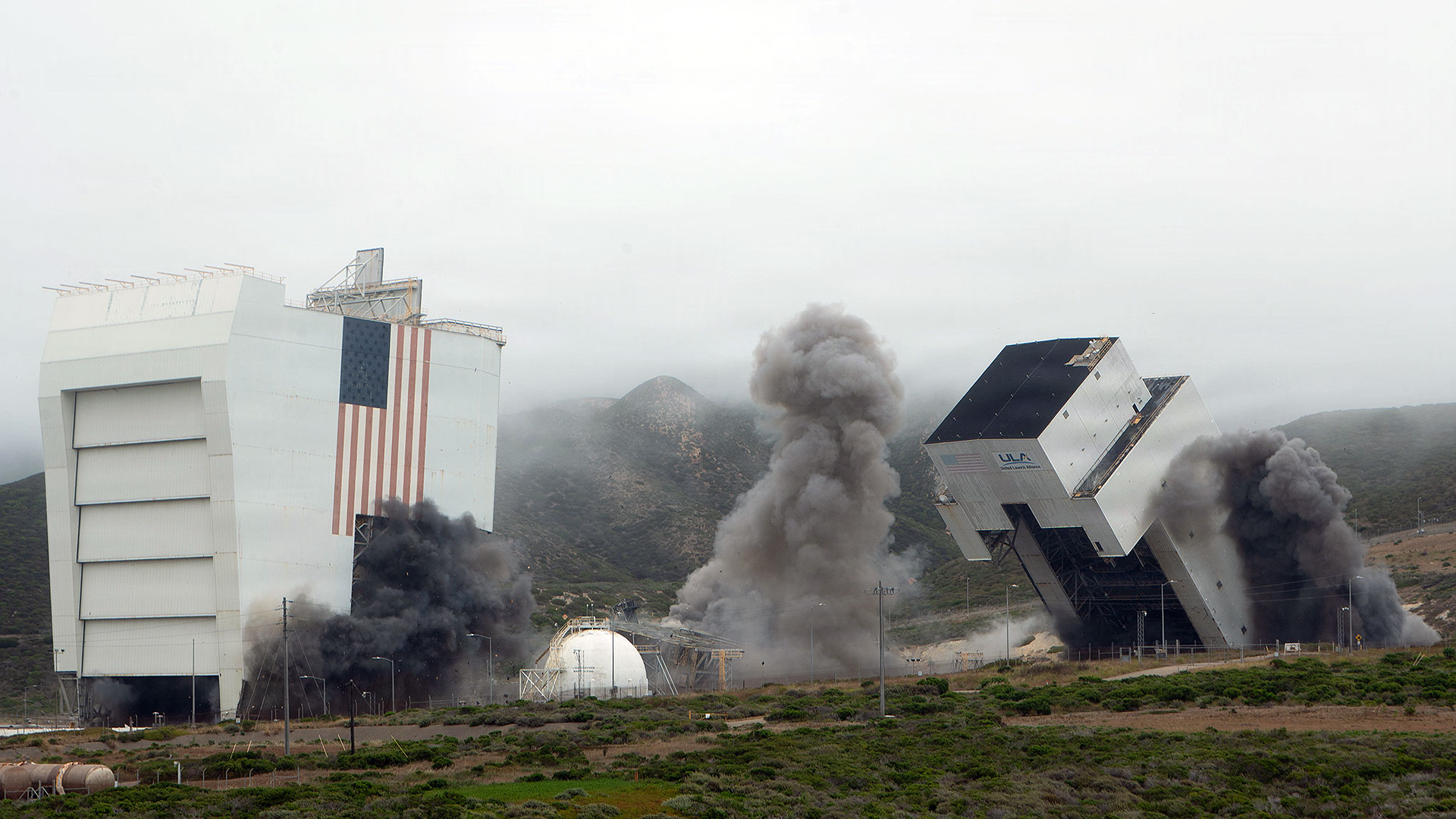
Launch infrastructure collapsing following the controlled demolition

On 24 April 2023, the United States Space Force announced that it was leasing SLC-6 to SpaceX for Falcon 9 and Falcon Heavy launches and landings. Prior to its leasing, there was interest among other companies for control over the pad thanks to its large size, most notably by Blue Origin for their New Glenn orbital launch vehicle. As of February 2026, SpaceX had gained approval to use SLC-6 at Vandenberg to compliment their existing facility at Space Launch Complex 4 East (SLC-4E), with launch pad construction and upgrading having since commenced.

On 16 June 2026, the Shuttle and Delta IV-era infrastructure such as the Mobile Service Tower, Fixed Umbilical Tower, and Tail Service Masts were demolished, to make way for SpaceX's plans to construct traditional horizontal integration facility and transporter erector setup with two Falcon landing pads as seen at their other pads.

The first launch may occur in late 2026, but more likely in early 2027.

== Launch history ==
=== Statistics ===
Launch sites at Vandenberg Space Force Base
Active pads
Active pads not used for launches
Inactive leased pads
Inactive unleased pads
1 SLC-1E
2 SLC-1W
3 SLC-2E
4 SLC-2W
5 SLC-10E
6 SLC-10W
7 LC-576E
8 SLC-9
9 SLC-3E
10 SLC-3W
11 SLC-4E
12 SLC-4W (LZ-4)
13 SLC-5
14 SLC-6
15 SLC-8
16 SLC-7
17 SLC-11
18 SLC-12
19 SLC-14
20 SLC-15
- Athena I
- Athena II
- Delta IV
- Delta IV Heavy
- Falcon 9
- Falcon Heavy

=== List of launches ===
All Athena launches operated by Lockheed Martin. All launches in 2006 operated by Boeing. All launches from 2011 to 2022 operated by United Launch Alliance.

No.	Date	Time (UTC)	Launch vehicle	Configuration	Payload	Outcome	Remarks
1	15 August 1995	22:30	Athena I	N/A	GemStar 1	Failure	First launch from SLC-6. Maiden flight of the Athena I and of the Athena family. Thrust Vector control system failure led to range safety protocols 160 seconds after launch.
2	23 August 1997	06:51	Athena I	N/A	Lewis	Success	Part of the Small Satellite Technology Initiative, aiming to conduct Earth observation and ultraviolet astronomy. Launch was a success, but improper modification of altitude control system led to loss of signal three days into operation.
3	27 April 1999	18:22	Athena II	N/A	IKONOS 1	Failure	First Athena II flight from SLC-6. Payload fairing failed to separate and satellite did not achieve orbit.
4	24 September 1999	18:21	Athena II	N/A	IKONOS 2	Success	Final flight of the Athena II and last Athena launch from SLC-6.
5	28 June 2006	03:33	Delta IV	Medium+ (4,2)	NROL-22	Success	NRO launch. Trumpet satellite, also known as USA-184. First launch for the National Reconnaissance Office on a Delta IV. First Delta IV launch from Vandenberg, and first military launch from SLC-6.
6	4 November 2006	13:53	Delta IV	Medium	USA-192 (DMSP F17)	Success	
7	20 January 2011	21:10	Delta IV Heavy	Heavy	NROL-49	Success	NRO launch. KH-11 satellite, also known as USA-224. First Delta IV Heavy launch from Vandenberg.
8	2 April 2012	23:04	Delta IV	Medium+ (5,2)	NROL-25	Success	NRO launch. Topaz satellite, also known as USA-234.
9	28 August 2013	18:03	Delta IV Heavy	Heavy	NROL-65	Success	NRO launch. KH-11 satellite, also known as USA-245.
10	10 February 2016	11:40	Delta IV	Medium+ (5,2)	NROL-45	Success	NRO launch. Topaz satellite, also known as USA-267.
11	12 January 2018	22:11	Delta IV	Medium+ (5,2)	NROL-47	Success	NRO launch. Topaz satellite, also known as USA-281. Final Delta IV Medium launch from Vandenberg.
12	19 January 2019	11:10	Delta IV Heavy	Heavy	NROL-71	Success	NRO launch. KH-11 satellite, also known as USA-290.
13	26 April 2021	20:47	Delta IV Heavy	Heavy	NROL-82	Success	NRO launch. KH-11 satellite, also known as USA-314.
14	24 September 2022	22:25	Delta IV Heavy	Heavy	NROL-91	Success	NRO launch. KH-11 satellite, also known as USA-338. Final Delta IV launch from SLC-6, and last flight of a Delta rocket from Vandenberg.
