= Thor DSV-2U =

United States expendable launch vehicle

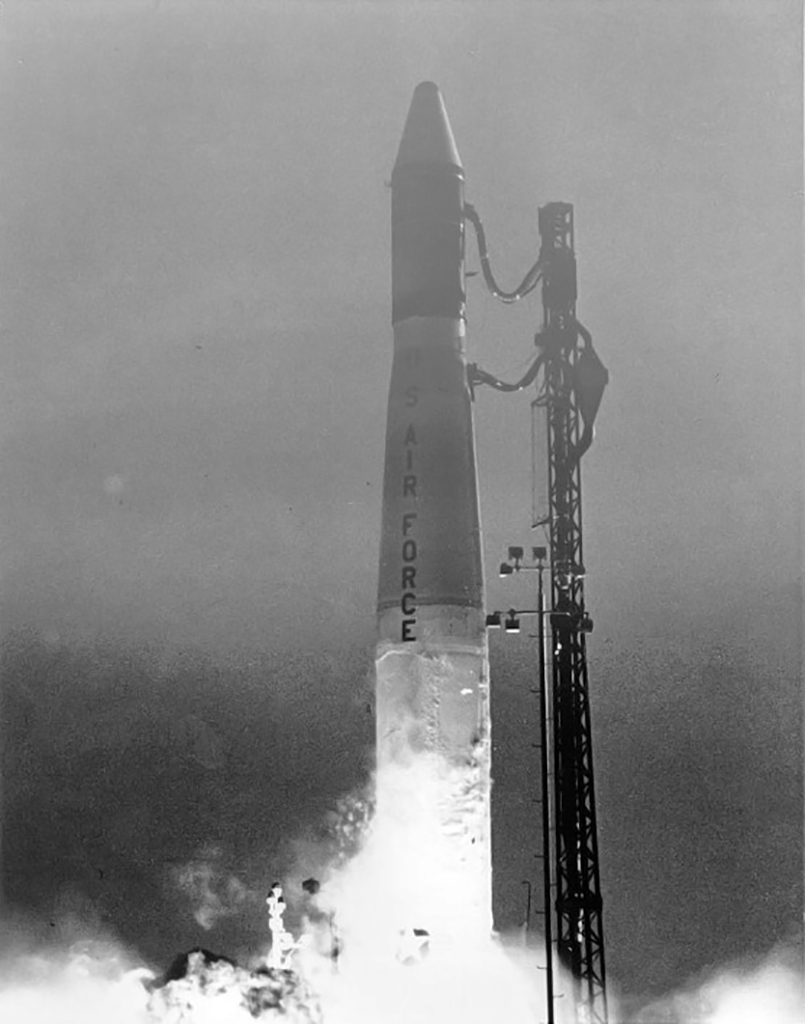
- Launch of the last Thor DSV-2U carrying DMSP-5D1 F5
- Function: Expendable launch system
- Country of origin: United States

Size
- Mass: 49500 kg
- Stages: 3

Capacity
- Payload to LEO: 500 kg

Launch history
- Status: Retired
- Launch sites: Vandenberg SLC-10W
- Total launches: 5
- Success(es): 4
- Failure: 1
- First flight: September 11 1976
- Last flight: July 15 1980

First stage - Thor DM-19
- Engines: LR79-7
- Thrust: 758.71 kN
- Specific impulse: 282
- Burn time: 165
- Propellant: LOx/Kerosene

Second stage Star 37XE
- Engines: TE-M-714-4
- Thrust: 45 kN
- Burn time: 66
- Propellant: solid

Third stage - Star-37S-ISS
- Engines: TE-M-364-15
- Thrust: 51.1 kN
- Burn time: 60
- Propellant: solid

The Thor DSV-2U or Thor LV-2F Star-37XE Star-37S-ISS was an American expendable launch system used to launch five DMSP weather satellites between 1976 and 1980. It was a member of the Thor family of rockets, and a derivative of the Thor DSV-2.

The first stage was a Thor missile in the DM-19 configuration. A Star-37XE was used as the second stage, and the third stage was a Star-37S-ISS.

Thor boosters used an erector system to hoist them up to the pad. While common on Soviet launch vehicles, this method was unusual in the US space program.

== Launches ==
Thor DSV-2U was launched five times between 1976 and 1980 from Space Launch Complex 10W at the Vandenberg Air Force Base.

All launches carried DMSP 5D-1 satellites The final launch (Thor 304) occurred on July 14, 1980 and was a failure.

Thor DSV-2U launches
Serial number	Launch date	Name	Status
172	11 Sep 1976	DMSP 5D-1/F1	In orbit; aka AMS 1
183	5 Jun 1977	DMSP 5D-1/F2	In orbit; aka AMS 2
143	1 May 1978	DMSP 5D-1/F3	In orbit; aka AMS 3
264	6 Jun 1979	DMSP 5D-1/F4	In orbit; aka AMS 4
304	14 July 1980	DMSP 5D-1/F5	Failed to orbit; aka AMS 5

=== Thor 304 failure ===
Thor 304 had been erected on the pad a few weeks before launch, and during this step, a connecting pin in the erector broke and sent the rocket falling back down to ground level. Launch crews examined the Thor for damage, but could not find any outward indication of it. The booster passed routine preflight systems checks and liftoff took place at 6:22 PM PST on July 14, 1980.

Shortly after liftoff, the Thor's telemetry system failed, but weather conditions and visibility were excellent, and the booster could be tracked visually for over two minutes. Telemetry from the DMSP satellite indicated that it was operating properly. SECO took place on time, as did the second stage burn. Third stage burn began, and then after about four seconds, all telemetry abruptly ceased.

The initial assumption was that the third stage exploded, and initial Air Force press releases about the launch stated such. However, radar tracking showed that the third stage motor continued operating as it drove the DMSP into the Pacific Ocean.

The investigation board concluded that connectors in the electrical interface between the second and third stage had been jolted loose by the erector mishap several weeks earlier. After second stage burnout, staging failed to take place due to the misaligned connectors, and the third stage motor thus fired with the spent second stage still attached to it. The force from the third stage motor burning managed to tear the second stage free, but in doing so, it ripped out wiring in the base of the third stage, which shorted out the guidance computer and caused it to direct the stage and spacecraft down into the ocean. Much like the DMSP failure in 1976, the incident was attributed to poor program management.
