= Thor-Burner =

American expendable launch system, a member of the Thor rocket family

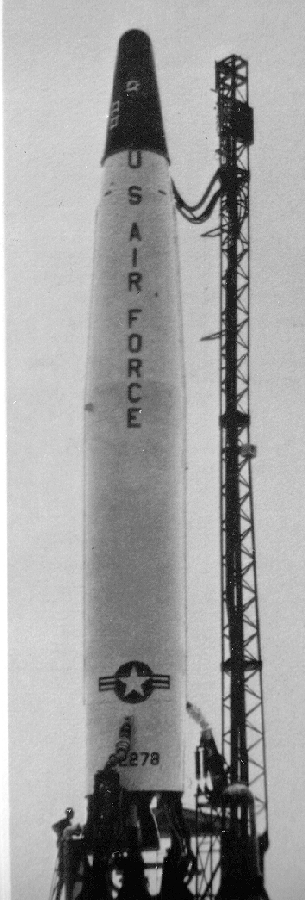
- Thor-LV2F Burner-2
- Function: Expendable launch system
- Manufacturer: Douglas
- Country of origin: United States

Size
- Height: 23 m (75 ft)
- Diameter: 2.44 m (8 ft)
- Mass: 50,000 kg (110,000 lb)
- Stages: 2-3

Launch history
- Status: Retired
- Launch sites: Vandenberg AFB, LC-4300, LE-6, SLC-10W
- Total launches: 26
- Success(es): 23
- Failure(s): 3
- First flight: 19 Jan 1965
- Last flight: 19 February 1976

The Thor-Burner was an American expendable launch system, a member of the Thor rocket family. It consisted of a Thor missile, with one or two Burner upper stages. It was used between 1965 and 1976 to orbit a number of satellites, most commonly Defense Meteorological Satellite Program (DMSP) weather satellites. Twenty-four were launched, of which two failed. It weighed 51,810 kg and was 24 metres tall.

== Variants ==
There are many Thor-Burner variations, according to the type of upper stages used:

Name	1st stage	2nd stage	3rd stage
Thor-LV2D Burner-1 (MG-18)	DSV-2S	MG-18	-
Thor-LV2D Burner-1 (Altair-3)	DSV-2S	Altair-3 / FW-4S	-
Thor-LV2F Burner-2	DSV-2U	Burner-2 / Star-37B	-
Thor-LV2F Burner-2 Star-13A	DSV-2U	Burner-2 / Star-37B	Star-13A
Thor-LV2F Burner-2A	DSV-2U	Burner-2A #1 / Star-37B	Burner-2A #2 / Star-26B

=== Burner-1 ===
The first two flights used a solid fuel MG-18 as second stage (Thor-LV2D Burner-1 (MG-18)).

After that an Altair rocket stage (same as the third stage of some Vanguard launch vehicles) was used, equipped by Boeing with 3-axis control (Thor-LV2D Burner-1 (Altair-3)).

These combinations were used for six vehicles. The first was launched on 1965-01-18 and the sixth on 1966-03-30. These were early launches of classified DMSP satellites. Two of these launches failed.

=== Burner-2 ===
The Burner 2 used with the Thor-Burner was the first solid fuel upper-stage vehicle used for general space applications that had full control and guidance capability. The first Burner-2 flight was on 1966-09-16.

On February 19, 1976, the attempted launch of a DMSP satellite from Vandenberg's SLC-10W went awry when SECO occurred 5 seconds early. Although the second stage separated and fired properly, the satellite was left in an unusable orbit from which it decayed only one hour after launch. Investigation into the mishap found that the Thor had been loaded an insufficient amount of RJ-1 (a higher grade of kerosene fuel that offered enhanced performance over standard RP-1) for the mission. The amount of LOX on Thor boosters was always the same on every launch, but the amount of kerosene could vary depending on the engine, as different LR-79 engines had slightly different performance levels, and so factory acceptance data was used to determine the fuel load needed for a particular unit. The particular engine used in Thor 182 had thus been loaded with kerosene according to the data sheet provided by Rocketdyne, however the information contained a typo which led to ground crews loading too little propellant for it. However, the postflight investigation also found that, even if the correct propellant load had been carried, the mission would have still failed because the Thor did not have sufficient performance to loft the DMSP into the required orbit. As the DMSP program evolved, the satellites gradually became heavier and more complex. Program planners, aware of this, selected an LR-79 engine which had particularly high performance, but it still turned out to not be enough for the mission. The failure was thus ultimately attributed to poor mission planning.

== Launches ==
There were twenty six Thor-Burner launches from Vandenberg AFB:

Date	Serial	Variant	Site	Payload
19.01.1965	224	Thor-LV2D Burner-1 (MG-18)	4300-B6	DSAP-1 F10 (Stage 2 failed to separate from satellite)
18.03.1965	306	Thor-LV2D Burner-1 (MG-18)	4300-B6	DSAP-1 F11
20.05.1965	282	Thor-LV2D Burner-1 (Altair-3)	4300-B6	DSAP-3 F1
10.09.1965	213	Thor-LV2D Burner-1 (Altair-3)	4300-B6	DSAP-2 F1
06.01.1966	251	Thor-LV2D Burner-1 (Altair-3)	4300-B6	DSAP-2 F2 (Stage 2 failed)
31.03.1966	147	Thor-LV2D Burner-1 (Altair-3)	4300-B6	DSAP-2 F3
16.09.1966	167	Thor-LV2F Burner-2	4300-B6	DSAP-4A F1
08.02.1967	169	Thor-LV2F Burner-2	4300-B6	DSAP-4A F2
29.06.1967	171	Thor-LV2F Burner-2 Star-13A	LE-6	Aurora (P67-1) / SECOR 9 (EGRS 9)
23.08.1967	266	Thor-LV2F Burner-2	LE-6	DSAP-4A F3
11.10.1967	268	Thor-LV2F Burner-2	LE-6	DSAP-4A F4
23.05.1968	277	Thor-LV2F Burner-2	SLC-10W	DSAP-4B F1
23.10.1968	173	Thor-LV2F Burner-2	SLC-10W	DSAP-4B F2
23.07.1969	279	Thor-LV2F Burner-2	SLC-10W	DSAP-4B F3
11.02.1970	287	Thor-LV2F Burner-2	SLC-10W	DSAP-5A F1
03.09.1970	288	Thor-LV2F Burner-2	SLC-10W	DSAP-5A F2
17.02.1971	249	Thor-LV2F Burner-2	SLC-10W	DSAP-5A F3 / NRL-PL 170A / NRL-PL 170B / NRL-PL 170C (S70-4)
08.06.1971	210	Thor-LV2F Burner-2	SLC-10W	SESP 1 (P70-1)
14.10.1971	159	Thor-LV2F Burner-2A	SLC-10W	DSAP-5B F1
24.03.1972	153	Thor-LV2F Burner-2A	SLC-10W	DSAP-5B F2
09.11.1972	294	Thor-LV2F Burner-2A	SLC-10W	DSAP-5B F3
17.08.1973	291	Thor-LV2F Burner-2A	SLC-10W	DSAP-5B F4
16.03.1974	207	Thor-LV2F Burner-2A	SLC-10W	DMSP-5B F5
09.08.1974	275	Thor-LV2F Burner-2A	SLC-10W	DMSP-5C F1
24.05.1975	197	Thor-LV2F Burner-2A	SLC-10W	DMSP-5C F2
19.02.1976	182	Thor-LV2F Burner-2A	SLC-10W	DMSP-5C F3 (Thor failed, wrong orbit attained)
