= Atlas E/F =

American expendable launch vehicle

- Function: Expendable launch system Sounding rocket
- Manufacturer: Convair/General Dynamics; Lockheed
- Country of origin: United States

Launch history
- Status: Retired
- Launch sites: LC-576 and SLC-3, VAFB
- Total launches: 65
- Success(es): 56
- Failure: 9
- First flight: 6 April 1968
- Last flight: 24 March 1995

The Atlas E/F (or SB-1A) was an American expendable launch system and sounding rocket built using parts of decommissioned SM-65 Atlas missiles. It was a member of the Atlas family of rockets.

The first stage was built using parts taken from decommissioned Atlas-E and Atlas-F missiles, with various solid propellant upper stages used depending on the requirements of the payload. The Atlas E/F was also used without an upper stage for a series of re-entry vehicle tests. On a single launch, an RM-81 Agena liquid-propellant upper stage was used.

== Variants ==
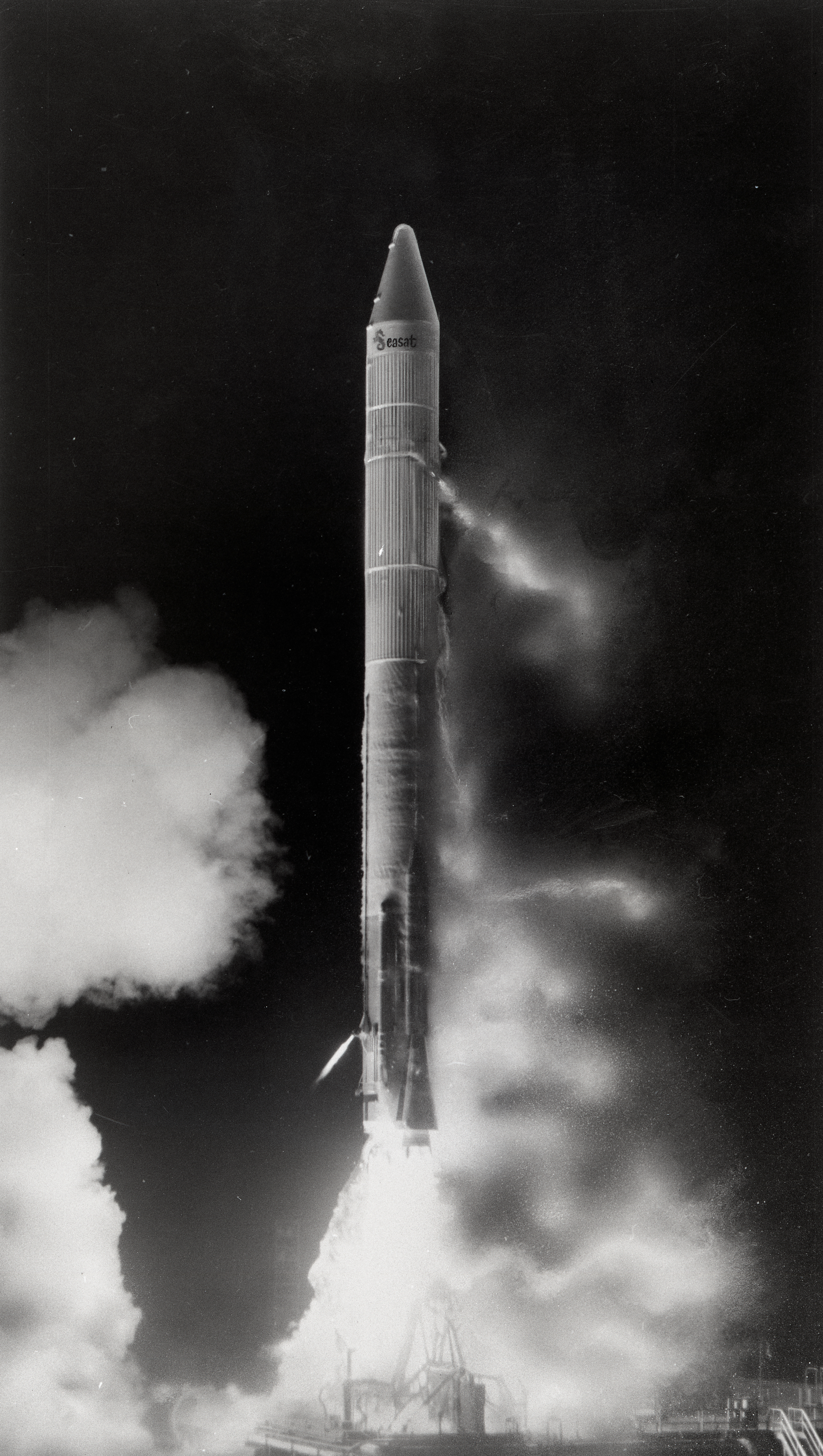
Atlas E/F-Agena

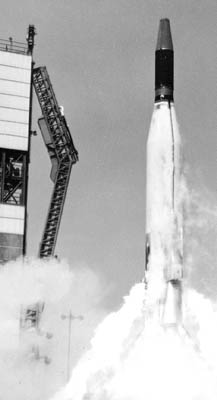
Atlas-F Burner-2

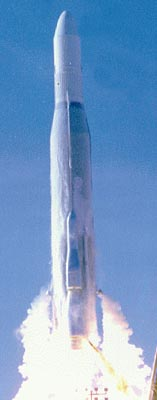
Atlas-F MSD

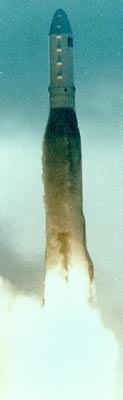
Atlas E OIS

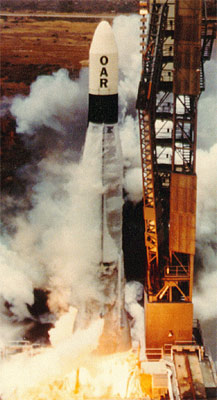
Atlas E/F OV1

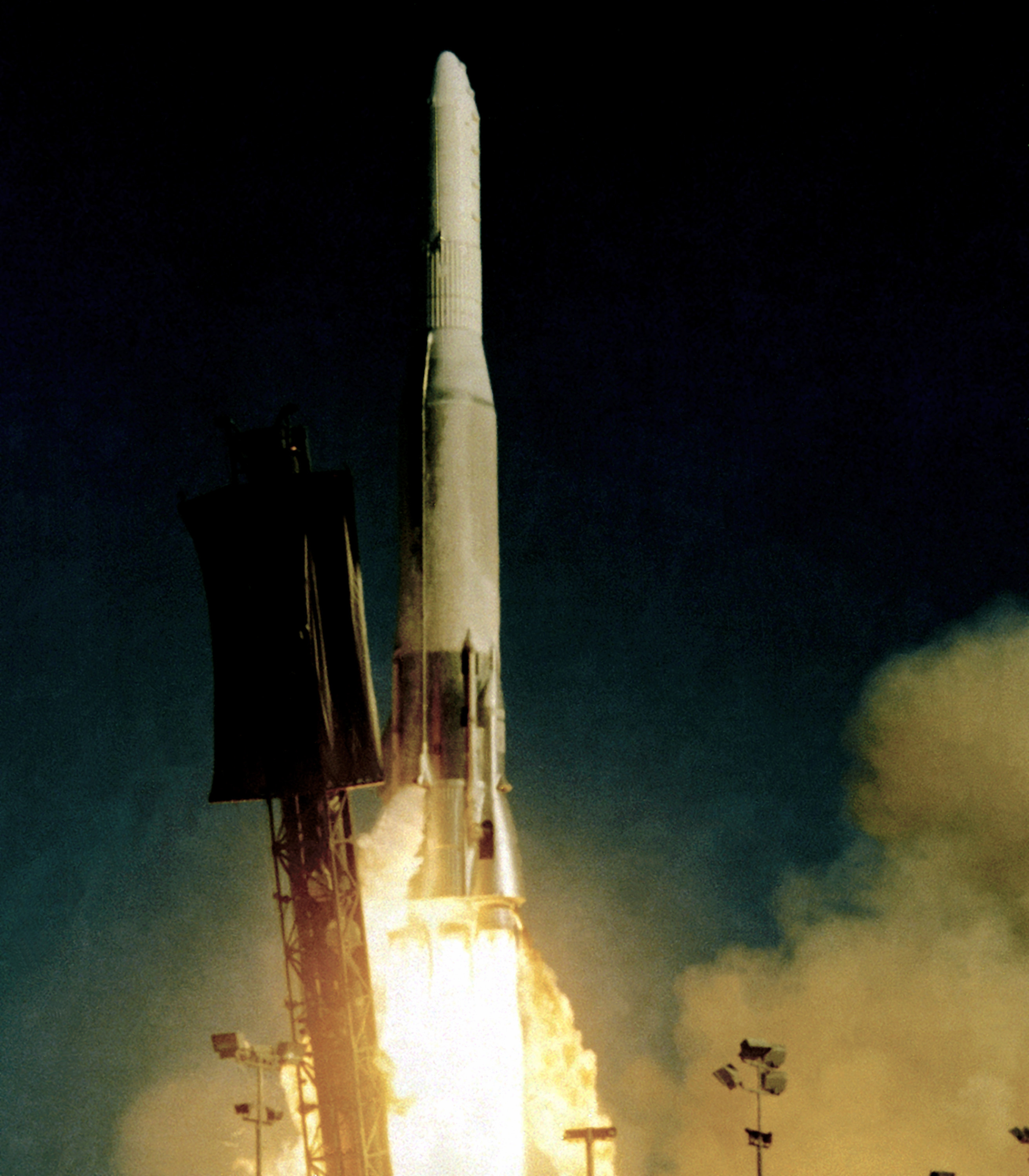
Atlas F SGS-1

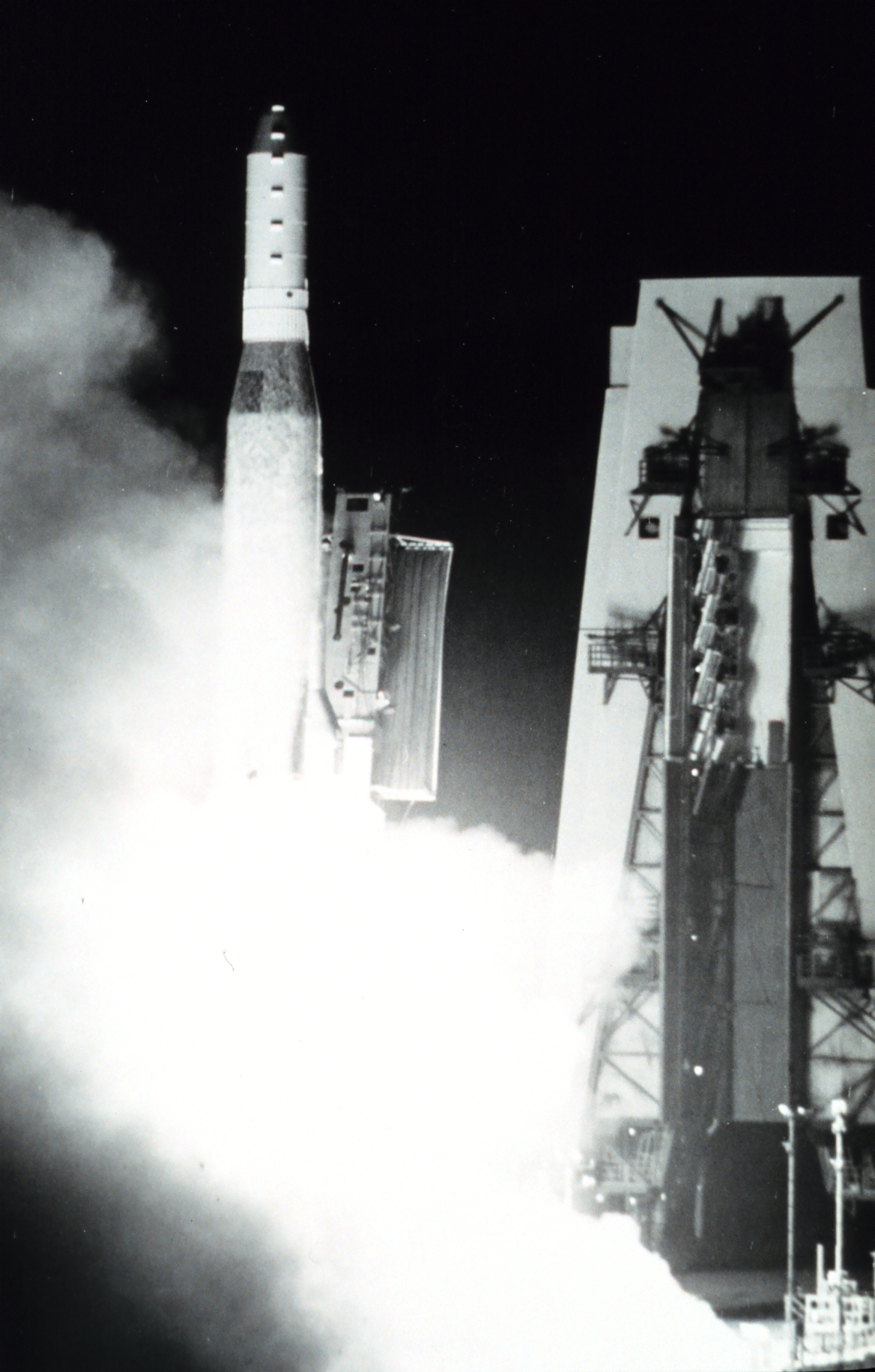
Atlas E/F-Star

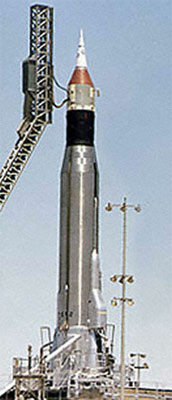
Atlas E/F-Trident

=== Atlas E/F ===
Thirty Atlas E/F rockets were launched without upper stages for ABRES and BMRS re-entry vehicle tests between 1965 and 1974. Three of these launches failed. Five ABRES launches were also conducted while the missiles were still operational, but did not use the Atlas E/F configuration.

=== Atlas E/F-Agena ===
An RM-81 Agena upper stage was used on a former Atlas-F, to launch the Seasat satellite on 27 June 1978. This was the final flight of the Atlas-Agena. Previous Atlas-Agena launches were launched on Atlas D or Atlas SLV-3 first stages, but the final Atlas-Agena used an Atlas E/F.

=== Atlas E/F-Altair ===
An Atlas E/F with an Altair-3A upper stage was used to launch three Stacksat spacecraft on 11 April 1990. The rocket was capable of placing 210 kg (460 lb) of payload into low Earth orbit.

=== Atlas E/F-Burner ===
A Burner-2 upper stage was used on an Atlas E/F to launch the Radsat and Radcat satellites on 2 October 1972. The rocket had a payload capacity of 950 kg (2,090 lb) to low Earth orbit.

=== Atlas E/F-MSD ===
Atlas E/F rockets with a MSD (Multiple Satellite Dispenser) upper stage (FW-4D) were used for four launches, with Parcae (NOSS) naval reconnaissance satellites between 1976 and 1980. The fourth of these launches failed when one of the booster unit engines shut down early. This configuration had a maximum payload capacity of 800 kg (1,800 lb) to LEO.

=== Atlas E/F-OIS ===
The OIS upper stage (Star-27) was used for two Atlas E/F launches in 1979 and 1985, with the Solwind and Geosat spacecraft respectively. The rocket could place 870 kilograms (1,920 lb) into low Earth orbit.

=== Atlas E/F-OV1 ===
The Atlas E/F was used between 1968 and 1971 to launch four groups of OV1 satellites, using OV1 upper stages powered by a FW-4S (Altair-3) solid rocket motors. Each payload had its own upper stage. Three of the launches carried two OV1 satellites, and one carried three. Two of the launches also carried secondary payloads. In this configuration, the rocket could place 363 kg (800 lb) into LEO.

=== Atlas E/F-PTS ===
The PTS upper stage (Star-37E) was used to launch the NTS-1 satellite on 14 July 1974. The upper stage gave the vehicle a payload capacity of 295 kg (650 lb) to a medium Earth transfer orbit.

=== Atlas E/F-SGS ===
The SGS upper stage, which consisted of two Star series solid rocket motors, was used on twelve Atlas E/F launches, with early GPS satellites. The first eight used the SGS-1 (Star-37E), which could place 455 kg (1,003 lb) of payload into a medium Earth transfer orbit, whereas the last four used the more powerful SGS-2 (Star-48B). The eighth launch failed.

=== Atlas E/F-Star ===
A Star-17A was used in the launch of the RM-20 spacecraft on 12 April 1975, giving the rocket a LEO payload of 725 kg (1,598 lb). The RM-20 launch failed due to damage to the first stage, caused by the explosion of residual fuel in the flame trench during launch. Another launch failed due to stage separation occurring at the correct time despite the first stage burn being extended by fifty seconds to resolve an underperformance issue, the result of which was the upper stage separating and igniting while the first stage was still firing.

The Star-37S-ISS was used to launch nineteen Defense Meteorological Satellite Program (DMSP), National Oceanic and Atmospheric Administration (NOAA) and Television Infrared Observation Satellite (TIROS) weather satellites between 1978 and 1995. With the Star-37 upper stage, the rocket could place 1,100 kg (2,400 lb) into a Sun-synchronous orbit (SSO).

=== Atlas E/F-Trident ===
The Atlas E/F was used with a Trident upper stage, between 1967 and 1971, for suborbital tests of re-entry vehicles. Nineteen were launched, of which two failed.
