= Discoverer 13 =

American reconnaissance satellite

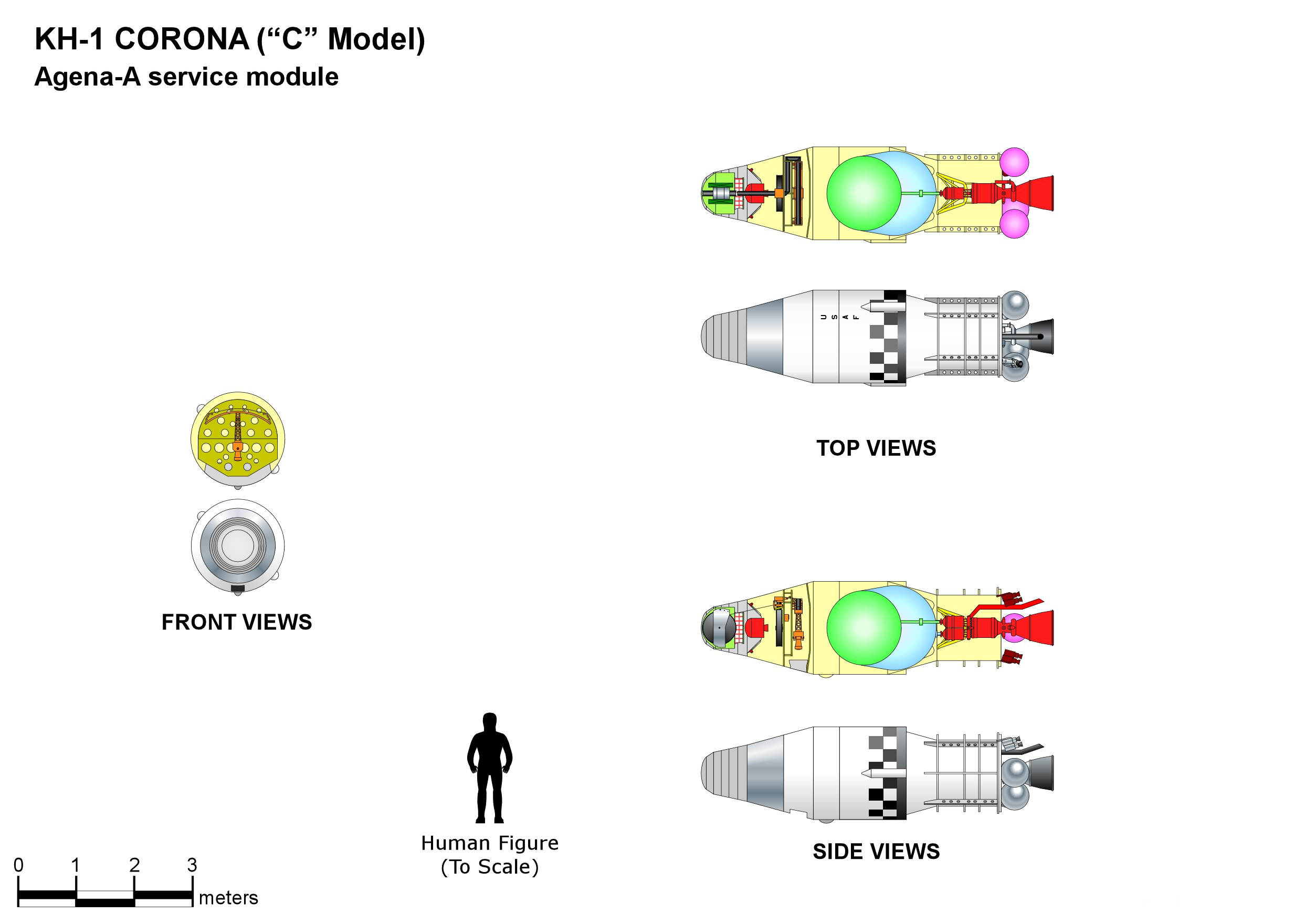
- Mission type: Optical reconnaissance
- Operator: US Air Force / NRO
- Harvard designation: 1960-Theta 1
- COSPAR ID: 1960-008A
- SATCAT no.: S00048

Spacecraft properties
- Spacecraft type: CORONA KH-1
- Bus: Agena-A
- Manufacturer: Lockheed
- Launch mass: 772 kilograms (1,702 lb)

Start of mission
- Launch date: 10 August 1960 20:37:54 GMT
- Rocket: Thor DM-21 Agena-A (Thor 231)
- Launch site: Vandenberg LC 75-3-5

End of mission
- Decay date: 14 November
- Landing date: 11 August
- Landing site: Pacific Ocean 610 kilometres (380 mi) NNW of Honolulu

Orbital parameters
- Reference system: Geocentric
- Regime: Low Earth
- Eccentricity: 0.03101
- Perigee altitude: 258 kilometers (160 mi)
- Apogee altitude: 683 kilometers (424 mi)
- Inclination: 82.850°
- Period: 94.04 minutes
- Epoch: 10 August 1960 20:38:00

Discoverer 13 was an American optical reconnaissance satellite launched on 10 August 1960 at 20:37:54 GMT. The last of five test flights of the Corona KH-1 spy satellite series, it was the first fully successful flight in the Discoverer series. On 11 August, after 17 orbits, the satellite's reentry capsule was recovered in the Pacific Ocean by the Haiti Victory. Its payload, an American flag, was presented to President Eisenhower four days later.

== Background ==
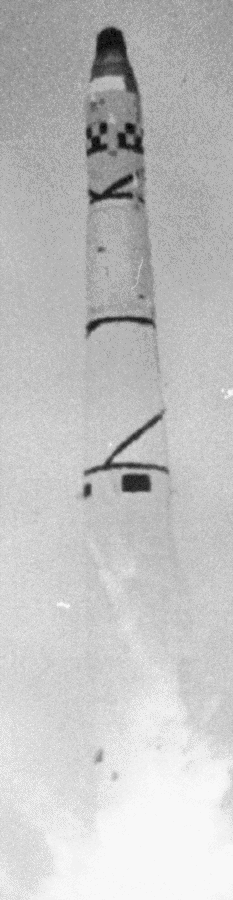
Thor Agena A with Discoverer 13, 10 August 1960

"Discoverer" was the civilian designation and cover for the Corona satellite photo-reconnaissance series of satellites managed by the Advanced Research Projects Agency of the Department of Defense and the U.S. Air Force. The primary goal of the satellites was to replace the U-2 spyplane in surveilling the Sino-Soviet Bloc, determining the disposition and speed of production of Soviet missiles and long-range bombers assess. The Corona program was also used to produce maps and charts for the Department of Defense and other US government mapping programs.

The first series of Corona satellites were the Keyhole 1 (KH-1) satellites based on the Agena-A upper stage, which not only offered housing but whose engine provided attitude control in orbit. The KH-1 payload included the C (for Corona) single, vertical-looking, panoramic camera that scanned back and forth, exposing its film at a right angle to the line of flight. The camera, built by Fairchild Camera and Instrument with a f/5.0 aperture and 61 centimetres (24 in) focal length, had a ground resolution of 12.9 metres (42 ft). Film was returned from orbit by a single General Electric Satellite Return Vehicle (SRV) constructed by General Electric. The SRV was equipped with an onboard small solid-fuel retro motor to deorbit at the end of the mission. Recovery of the capsule was done in mid-air by a specially equipped aircraft.

The Discoverer program began with a series of three test flights whose satellites carried no cameras, all launched in the first half of 1959. There followed eight operational Discoverer satellites, all of them partial or complete failures, though Discoverer 11, launched 15 April 1960, carried a new vacuum-resistant film and was the first mission on which the onboard camera worked properly. Discoverer 11 failed on reentry, caused by the explosion of its spin motor, and Discoverer 12, launched 29 June 1960, was a diagnostic flight to determine the causes of the various issues plaguing the program. Discoverer 12 was lost shortly after launch when its Agena booster malfunctioned.

== Spacecraft ==
Discoverer 13 was a diagnostic test satellite identical to Discoverer 12, a battery-powered satellite, housed in an Agena-A stage and composed of a satellite bus and SRV. Discoverers 12 and 13 largely differed from their operational predecessors in that, instead of mounting the "C" (for Corona) surveillance camera, the SRV contained extra telemetry. The bus also included a doppler beacon and external lights for tracking purposes. The combination of bus and SRV massed 772 kilograms (1,702 lb), the SRV alone massing 54.55 kilograms (120 lb) Like, Discoverer 12, Discoverer 13 carried a newly developed gas motor for spin stabilization to replace the system that had caused the loss of Discoverer 11. Discoverer 13 also carried an American flag in its SRV.

== Mission ==
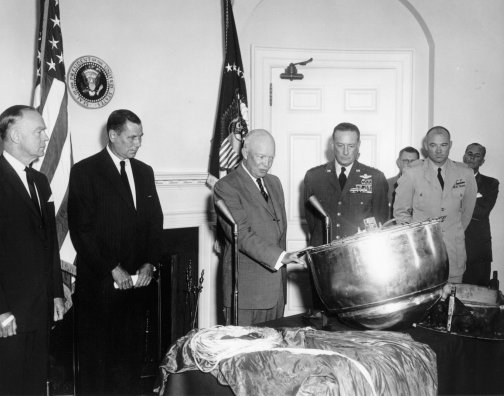
President Eisenhower inspects the capsule from Discover XIII

Launched 10 August 1960 at 20:37:54 GMT from Vandenberg LC 75-3-5 by a Thor DM-21 Agena-A rocket, Discoverer 13 performed according to plan. On 11 August, after 17 orbits, Discoverer 13 received a command from a ground station on Kodiak Island to start the reentry. After the Agena pitched itself down 60 degrees, the recovery vehicle was ejected by small springs, and the new spin engine, utilizing cold gas, spun the SRV for stability. Its retrorocket fired, reducing the capsule's velocity by 400 metres (1,300 ft) per second, and then the spin system despun the spacecraft. Just before it started to heat up on reentry, the orbit ejection subsystem dropped off the capsule and its heat shield. At 15,000 metres (49,000 ft) a small parachute was deployed, strobe lights and a radio beacon were activated, and the heat shield was released. After stabilization a larger parachute was deployed.

Though the SRV was supposed to have been caught in midair, the recovery airplane went off in the wrong direction, and the capsule splashed down in 610 kilometres (380 mi) NNW of Honolulu in the Pacific Ocean. A naval vessel, The Haiti Victory, sent out a helicopter which dropped divers into the water to attach a collar to the capsule for helicopter retrieval. The SRV was brought back to the ship and then taken to Pearl Harbor in Oahu.

Four days later, on 15 August, the American flag that Discoverer 13 carried instead of a camera was presented to President Eisenhower, the public celebration reinforcing the Corona program's civilian cover. Lockheed employees celebrated the successful flight with a party at a hotel in East Palo Alto, California, during which they threw program manager James Plummer into the pool and then jumped in, themselves.

The Agena portion of Discoverer 13 reentered on 14 November.

== Legacy ==
The success of Discoverer 13 paved the way for the first fully successful operational flight, Discoverer 14, launched on 18 August 1960. The CORONA program went on to comprise 145 flights in eight satellite series, the last mission launching on 25 May 1972. CORONA was declassified in 1995, and a formal acknowledgement of the existence of US reconnaissance programs, past and present, was issued in September 1996.
