= Horizontal integration facility =

Integration facility where missiles and rockets are assembled before launch

A horizontal integration facility (HIF) is an integration facility where missiles and rockets are assembled before launch.

== HIF in the United States ==
Site	Pad	Vehicle	Coordinates	Description	Images	Ref.
Cape Canaveral Space Force Station	SLC-37	Delta IV	28°31′25″N 80°34′15″W	A seven-story white building containing 2 bays measuring 250 feet (76 m) by 100 feet (30 m) each. Construction was completed in June 2000. Its floors are said to be the most level in the United States, varying less than 0.38 in (9.6 mm) across each bay. The first and second stages of the rocket, along with any boosters that are being used for that flight, are integrated in the HIF, and then the stack is moved to the pad and raised to vertical. The payload and fairing are assembled later.		
Cape Canaveral Space Force Station	SLC-40	Falcon 9	28°33′39″N 80°34′39″W	SpaceX built its first Falcon 9 HIF on the south side of the pad. It measures 225 feet (69 m) long by 75 feet (23 m) wide and stands about 50 feet (15 m) tall. A former payload integration facility is directly adjacent to the HIF. The HIF was extended to a length of at least 72 metres to accommodate the longer versions of the Falcon 9.		
Kennedy Space Center	LC-39A	Falcon 9 / Falcon Heavy	28°36′14″N 80°36′15″W	SpaceX built its second HIF on the Crawlerway leading to the Launch Complex 39A just outside of its perimeter. It can accommodate both Falcon 9 and Falcon Heavy. It is able to support 5 boosters side by side. Inside the HIF the Falcon 9 / Falcon Heavy rockets are assembled and the payload, encapsulated in the fairing is connected to the rocket.		
Kwajalein Atoll	Omelek Island	Falcon 1	9°02′50″N 167°44′34″E	An HIF has been built by SpaceX.	Exterior Interior	
Vandenberg Air Force Base	SLC-6	Delta IV	34°35′11″N 120°37′39″W	A "cavernous" HIF exists. The HIF contains two bays that can accommodate the Delta IV and Delta IV Heavy.	Exterior	
Wallops Flight Facility		Antares	37°50′44″N 75°28′31″W	HIF built by Orbital Sciences Corporation. The HIF is 250 feet (76 m) long by 150 feet (46 m) wide by 60 feet (18 m) tall. It opened in 2011.		

== HIF elsewhere ==
Most Russian, Ukrainian and former Soviet launchers are integrated horizontally, including Dnepr, Proton, Rockot, Shtil' and Soyuz. The Electron launch vehicle is also integrated horizontally and European Ariane 6 also uses HIF to integrate its rocket stack.
