= Star (rocket stage) =

Family of US solid-propellant rocket motors

The Star is a family of US solid-propellant rocket motors originally developed by Thiokol and used by many space propulsion and launch vehicle stages. They are used almost exclusively as upper stages, often as apogee kick motors. The number designations refer to the approximate diameter of the fuel casing in inches.

Three Star 37 stages, and one Star 48 stage, were launched on solar escape trajectories; fast enough to leave the Sun's orbit and out into interstellar space, where barring the low chance of colliding with debris, they will travel past other stars in the Milky Way galaxy and survive potentially intact for millions of years.

== Star 13 ==
The Star 13 (TE-M-458) is a solid fuel apogee kick motor. It was used on NASA's Anchored Interplanetary Monitoring Platform satellites. Several other versions were developed. Star 13D (TE-M-375) was used on the Syncom 1, Star 13A (TE-M-516) on LES 1/2, Aurora (P67-1), Orbiscal (P68-1), Lincoln Calibration Sphere 4, S3-2, Solrad 11A/B, SPX plume generator package, Freja, Meteor and Equator-S, Star 13C (TE-M-345-11/12) on AMSAT P3A and Star 13B (TE-M-763) on AMPTE-CCE payloads.

Thiokol Star 13 family
Name	Thiokol#	Mass (kg)		Prop. mass fract.	Imp.		Burn (s)
Name	Thiokol#	Total	Empty	Prop. mass fract.	Spec., I_{sp} (s)	Tot. (kgf-sec)	Burn (s)
Star 13	TE-M-458	36	5	0.869	273	8,524	22
Star 13A	TE-M-516	38	5	0.87	287	9,544	15
Star 13B	TE-M-763	47	6	0.87	286	11,807	15
Star 13C	TE-M-345-11/12	38	8	0.795	218	8,252	
Star 13D	TE-M-375	35	6	0.81	223	7,799	
Star 13E	TE-M-385	31	6	0.822	211	6,438	
Star 13F	TE-M-444	40	7	0.83	240	9,608	

== Star 17 ==
The Star 17 (TE-M-479) is a solid fuel apogee kick motor, first launched in 1963. It was used for payloads such as Radio Astronomy Explorer, SOLRAD and S3 satellites. The Star 17A (TE-M-521-5) version was used for orbit circularization on Skynet 1, NATO 1, IMP-H and IMP-J satellites.

Thiokol Star 17 family
Name	Thiokol#	Mass (kg)			Prop. mass fract.	Imp.		Burn (s)	Length (m)
Name	Thiokol#	Total	Empty	Prop.	Prop. mass fract.	Spec., I_{sp} (s)	Tot. (kgf-sec)	Burn (s)	Length (m)
Star 17	TE-M-479	79	9	70	0.881	286	20177	18	0.98
Star 17A	TE-M-521-5	126	14	112	0.903	287	32556	19	0.98

== Star 20 (Altair 3A) ==
The Star 20 (TE-M-640) is a solid fuel apogee kick motor, also known as Altair-3A. It was used as a second stage on an Atlas-E/F vehicle launching Stacksat. The TE-M-640 motor is similar to Altair 3 (FW-4S), and both are designated by NASA as Altair IIIA.

Thiokol Star 20 family
Name	Thiokol#	Mass (kg)		Prop. mass fract.	Imp.	
Name	Thiokol#	Total	Prop.	Prop. mass fract.	Spec., I_{sp} (s)	Tot. (kNs)
Star 20 Spherical	TE-M-251	123	114.8	0.934	234	296.25
Star 20	TE-M-640-1	300.9	273.2	0.908	286.5	771.77
Star 20A	TE-M-640-3	314.3	286.0	0.910	291.9	822.48
Star 20B	TE-M-640-4	306.7	273.8	0.893	289.1	776.53

== Star 24 ==
The Star 24 (TE-M-604) is a solid fuel apogee kick motor, first qualified in 1973. It burns an 86% solids carboxyl-terminated polybutadiene (CTPB)-based composite propellant. The "24" designation refers to the approximate diameter of the Titanium fuel casing in inches.

Thiokol Star 24 family
Name	Thiokol#	Mass (kg)			Prop. mass fract.	Imp.		Burn (s)	Length (m)
Name	Thiokol#	Total	Empty	Prop.	Prop. mass fract.	Spec., I_{sp} (s)	Tot. (kNs)	Burn (s)	Length (m)
Star 24	TE-M-604	218.2	18.33	199.9	0.916	282.9	560.5	29.6	1.03
Star 24A	TE-M-604-2	198	19	179	0.903	282	500		
Star 24B	TE-M-604-3	219	19	200	0.915	283	561.6		
Star 24C	TE-M-604-4	239.3	19.73	219.5	0.92	282.3	613.9	28.0	1.07

== Star 26 ==
The Star 26 (Burner 2A or TE-M-442) is an upper stage motor used in Burner II stage of the Sandia Strypi IV vehicle introduced in 1965. The Star 26B (TE-M-442-1) variant was used on the Thor-LV2F Burner-2A launcher. Star 26C (TE-M-442-2) was used on the DOT sounding rocket.

Thiokol Star 26 family
Name	Thiokol#	Mass (kg)		Prop. mass fract.	Imp.		Burn (s)
Name	Thiokol#	Total	Empty	Prop. mass fract.	Spec., I_{sp} (s)	Tot. (kN)	Burn (s)
Star 26	TE-M-442	268	37	0.86	220	39.10	18
Star 26B	TE-M-442-1	261	23	0.91	272	34.63	18
Star 26C	TE-M-442-2	264	32	0.88	272	35	17

== Star 27 ==
Star 27
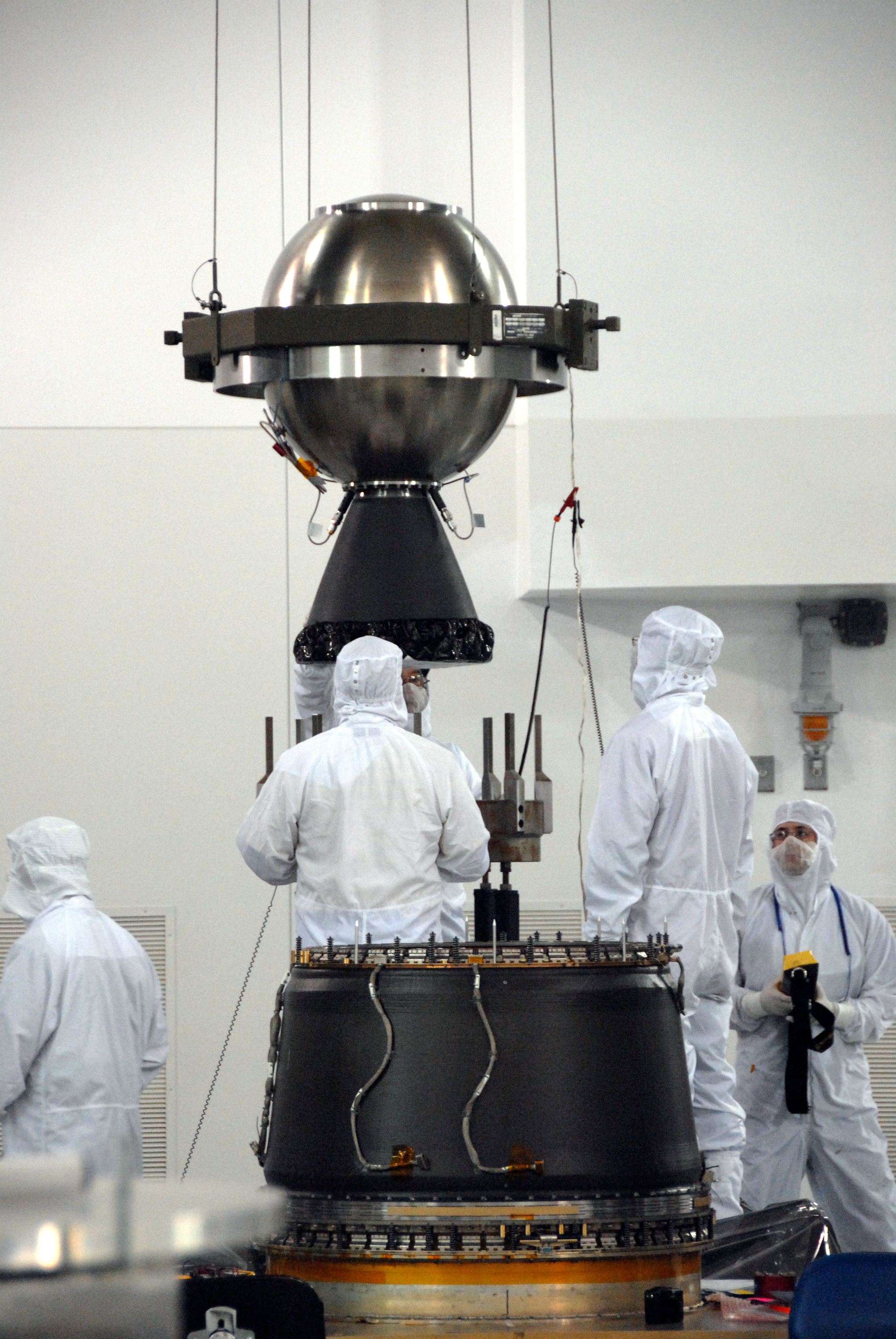
- A Star 27H kick motor for IBEX
- Country of origin: United States

Solid-fuel motor

The Star 27 is a solid apogee kick motor, with the 27 representing the approximate diameter of the stage in inches. It burns HTPB-based composite propellant with an average erosion rate of 0.0011 inches per second (0.028 mm/s).

It as used as a second stage on a version of the Atlas E/F rocket, launching the Solwind and Geosat satellites. When used on the Pegasus air-launch rocket payloads are capable of leaving Earth orbit.

A version of the Star 27, designated the Star 27H, was used in the launch of the IBEX spacecraft. The spacecraft had a mass of 105 kg by itself and together with its Star 27H motor, 462 kg. The Star 27H helped it get to a higher orbit, beyond Earth's magnetosphere.

Thiokol Star-27 family
Name	Thiokol#	Mass (kg)		Prop. mass fract.	Imp.	
Name	Thiokol#	Total	Empty	Prop. mass fract.	Spec., I_{sp} (s)	Tot. (kgf-sec)
Star 27	TE-M-616	361	27	0.924	288	96986
Star 27A	TE-M-616-1	336	27	0.919	288	89684
Star 27B	TE-M-616-4	345	28	0.921	288	92296
Star 27C	TE-M-616-5	333	28	0.918	288	88555
Star 27D	TE-M-616-8	332	26	0.921	288	88668
Star 27E	TE-M-616-9	331	26	0.921	287	88301

== Star 30 ==
The Star 30 (TE-M-700-2) is a solid fuel motor, with the 30 representing the approximate diameter of the stage in inches. Different versions (A, B, C, E and BP) were used as an apogee motor for satellites such as G-STAR, Skynet 4, Koreasat or the HS-376 satellite bus. Star 30E was used by the small ORBEX orbital launcher. A Star 30 booster was also used on the CONTOUR comet probe.

Thiokol Star 30 family
Name	Thiokol#	Mass (kg)		Prop. mass fract.	Imp.	
Name	Thiokol#	Total	Empty	Prop. mass fract.	Spec., I_{sp} (s)	Tot. (kgf-sec)
Star 30	TE-M-700-2	492	28	0.943	293	136455
Star 30A	TE-M-700-4	492	28	0.942	295	137095
Star 30B	TE-M-700-5	537	32	0.941	293	148816
Star 30C	TE-M-700-18	630	39	0.939	287	171002
Star 30E	TE-M-700-19	667	45	0.932	291	182216
Star 30BP	TE-M-700-20	543	38	0.931	292	148816

== Star 31 (Antares 1A) ==
The Star 31 (also known as Antares 1A or X-254) is a solid fuel motor, with the 31 representing the approximate diameter of the stage in inches. It had a thrust of 60.50 kN and a mass of 1225 kg. It was used as a stage on the WASP missile, Scout X, Scout X-1, Blue Scout Junior, Blue Scout I, Blue Scout II, Scout X-1A and RAM B.

== Star 37 ==
Star 37
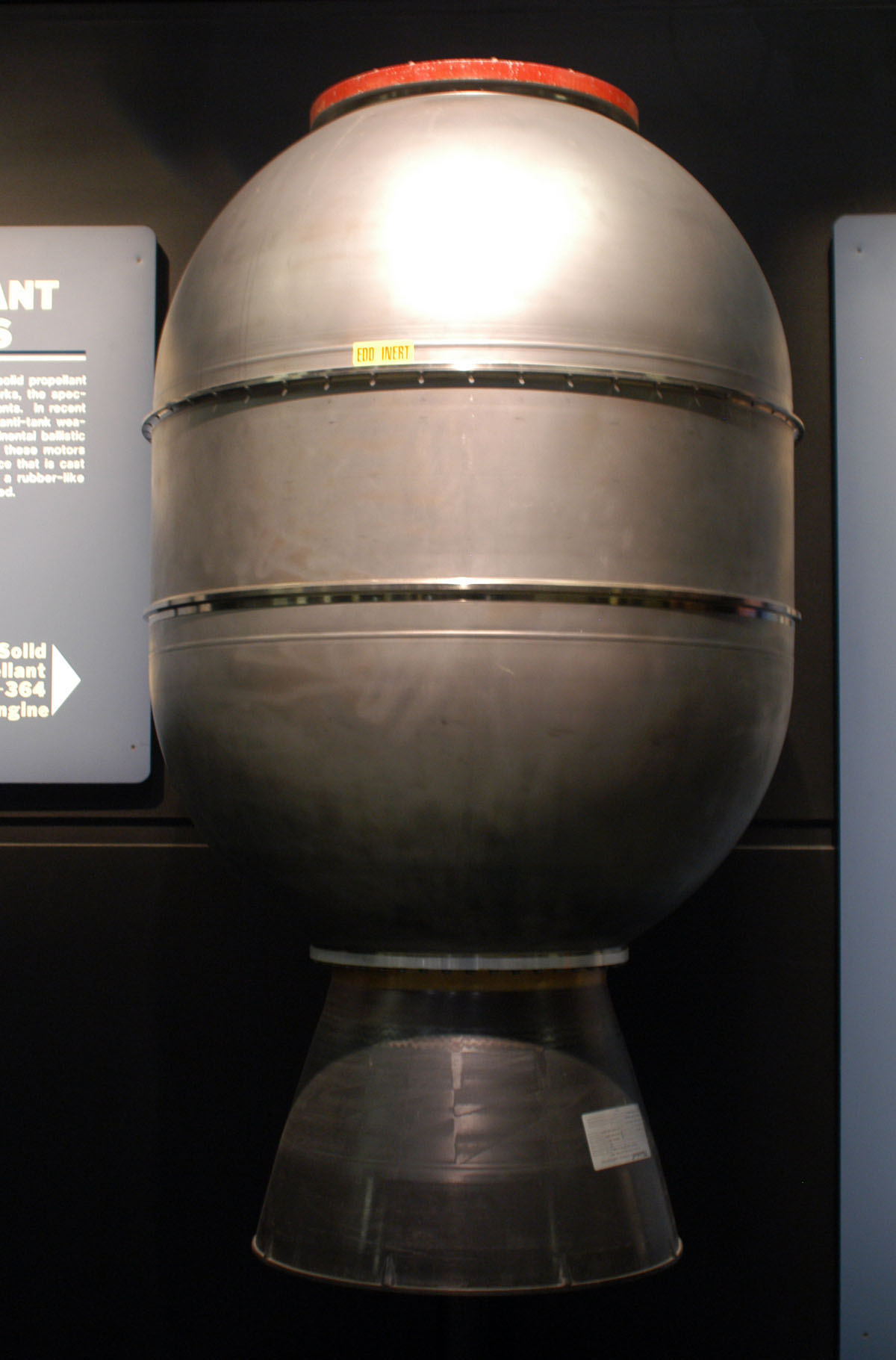
- Star 37E (TE-M-364-4)
- Country of origin: United States
- Date: 1963-present
- Manufacturer: Thiokol
- Application: Upper stage/Spacecraft propulsion
- Predecessor: Star 27
- Successor: Star 48
- Status: Active

Solid-fuel motor

Configuration
- Chamber: 1

Performance
- Thrust, vacuum: 33.600 kN (7,554 lbf)
- Specific impulse, vacuum: (161,512 N•s/kg)

Dimensions
- Length: 2.27 m (7.44 ft)
- Diameter: 0.66 m (2.16 ft)
- Empty mass: 113 kg (249 lb)

Used in
- Upper stage on Thor and Delta

The Star 37 was first used as the engine for the Thor-Burner upper stage in 1965. The Burner I used the Thiokol FW-4 engine and the Burner II used the Thiokol TE-M-364-2.

The "-37" designation refers to the approximate diameter of the titanium fuel casing in inches; Thiokol had also manufactured other motors such as the Star 40 and Star 48. Internally, Thiokol's designation was TE-M-364 for early versions, TE-M-714 for later ones, and TE-M-783 for a special HTPB model used for FLTSATCOM launches.

Subtypes are given one or more letter suffixes after the diameter number, or a trailing number (i.e., "-2") after the internal designation. Not surprisingly, the "T" prefix stands for Thiokol, and the following letter refers to the company division that developed the rocket motor. In this case, "M" refers to the Magna, UT Division. "E" refers to the Elkton, MD division.

The Star 37FM rocket motor was developed and qualified for use as an apogee kick motor on FLTSATCOM. The motor is a replacement for the Star 37E Delta, which has been discontinued. The Nozzle assembly uses a 3D carbon-carbon throat and a carbon-phenolic exit cone. Maximum propellant weight is 2,350 pounds (1,070 kg), while the motor has been qualified for propellant off-loading to 2,257 pounds (1,024 kg).

A spin-stabilized (Star 37FM) or thrust-vectoring (Star 37FMV) version of Star 37 is used as the final stage of the Minotaur V launch vehicle.

The Pioneer 10 & 11, and Voyager 1 & 2 Propulsion Modules used Star 37E motors; each is now on a similar interstellar trajectory to its companion probe, and is set to leave the Solar System (except the Pioneer 11 stage, which is thought to have remained in solar orbit).

Thiokol Star 37 family
Name (Thiokol#)	Mass (kg)			Prop. mass fract.	Prop.	Thrust, vac. (kN)	Imp.		Burn (s)	Length (m)	Remark
Name (Thiokol#)	Total	Empty	Prop.	Prop. mass fract.	Prop.	Thrust, vac. (kN)	Spec., I_{sp} (s)	Tot. (kNs)	Burn (s)	Length (m)	Remark
Star 37 (TE-M-364-1)	621.2	62.7	558.4	0.899	Solid	43.50	260.0	1584.46	42	0.80	
Star 37B (TE-M-364-2)	718.4	64.7	653.7	0.910	Solid	?	291.0	1858.91	?	?	
Star 37C (TE-M-364-18)	1047.5	82.8	964.7	0.921	Solid	?	285.5	2707.19	?	?	
Star 37D (TE-M-364-3)	718.4	64.7	653.7	0.910	Solid	?	266.0	1858.91	?	?	
Star 37E (TE-M-364-4)	1122.7	83.1	1039.6	0.926	Solid	?	283.6	2910.03	?	?	Discontinued
Star 37F (TE-M-364-19)	934.1	67.3	866.8	0.928	Solid	?	286.0	2444.46	?	?	Discontinued
Star 37FM (TE-M-783)	1147.4	81.5	1065.9	0.929	HTPB	47.26	289.8	3051.35	63	1.69	Developed and qualified for use as an apogee kick motor on FLTSATCOM
Star 37G (TE-M-364-11)	1152.4	86.4	1065.9	0.925	Solid	?	289.9	2988.36	?	?	
Star 37N (TE-M-364-14)	622.9	63.5	559.3	0.898	Solid	?	290.0	1590.24	?	?	
Star 37S (TE-M-364-15)	711.4	53.4	658.0	0.925	Solid	?	287.3	1872.43	?	?	
Star 37X (TE-M-714-1)	1150.0	82.8	1067.2	0.928	Solid	51.10	295.6	3047.69	60	?	
Star 37XE (TE-M-714-4)	?	?	?	?	Solid	?	?	?	?	?	
Star 37XF (TE-M-714-6)	953.2	67.7	885.4	0.929	Solid	?	290.0	2542.03	?	?	
Star 37XF (TE-M-714-8)	882.5	67.1	815.4	0.924	Solid	?	291.1	2342.74	?	?	
Star 37XFP (TE-M-714-17/18)	955.3	71.7	883.6	0.925	HTPB	38.03	290.0	2537.49	67	1.50	Qualified as the orbit insertion motor for Boeing's Global Positioning Satellite (GPS), and as the apogee motor for the RCA SATCOM Ku-Band satellite.
Star 37Y (TE-M-714-2)	1152.1	80.6	1071.4	0.930	Solid	?	297.0	3118.20	?	?	

== Star 48 ==
Star 48
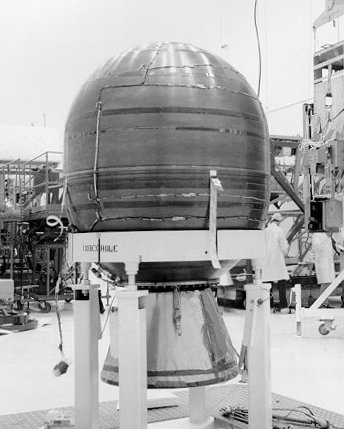
- Star-48B rocket motor
- Country of origin: United States
- Date: 1982 - present
- Manufacturer: Thiokol
- Predecessor: Star 37

Solid-fuel motor

The Star 48 is a type of solid rocket motor developed primarily by Thiokol Propulsion, which was purchased by Orbital ATK in 2001. In 2018, Orbital ATK in turn was acquired by Northrop Grumman.

The "48" designation refers to the approximate diameter of the fuel casing in inches; Thiokol had also manufactured other motors such as the Star 37 and Star 30. Internally, Thiokol's designation was TE-M-711 for early versions, and TE-M-799 for later ones. Subtypes are given one or more letter suffixes after the diameter number, or a trailing number (i.e., "-2") after the internal designation. The "T" prefix stands for Thiokol, and the following letter refers to the company division that developed the rocket motor. In this case, "E" refers to the Elkton, MD division and the "M" stands for motor.

The most common use of the Star 48 was as the final stage of the Delta II launch vehicles. Other launchers such as ULA's Atlas 551 have also incorporated the motor, but with lower frequency. On board the Space Shuttle, the complete stage (motor plus accessories) was referred to as the Payload Assist Module (PAM), as the Shuttle could only take satellites to low Earth orbit. Because geostationary orbit is much more lucrative, the additional stage was needed for the final leg of the journey. On such missions, the stage was spin-stabilized. A turntable, mounted in the shuttle payload bay or atop the previous Delta stage, spun the PAM and payload to approximately 60 rpm prior to release.

Usually after motor burnout and just prior to satellite release the spin is canceled out using a yo-yo de-spin technique.

A non-spinning, thrust-vectoring version is known as the Star 48BV, which had its design based on the Star 48B. It is available, but much less common. A Star 48BV is the final stage of the Minotaur IV+ launch vehicle.

A Star 48B motor used in the 3rd stage of the New Horizons probe was the first part of the New Horizons mission to reach Jupiter, crossing Pluto's orbit in 2015 at a distance of 200 million kilometers. It is now set to leave the Solar System, traveling on a similar interstellar trajectory to its companion probe for the indefinite future.

In 2013 a Star 48GXV was tested for the Parker Solar Probe mission as the upper stage on an Atlas V 551 vehicle, but the development was canceled, in favor of a Delta IV Heavy / Star 48BV combination. The Star 48GXV boasted a carbon composite casing and nozzle, enabling it to operate at triple the chamber pressure of an ordinary Star 48. It also featured electro-mechanical actuators to gimbal the nozzle, along with digital flight controls.

== Star 63 ==
The Star 63 is a solid fuel motor, with the 63 representing the approximate diameter of the stage in inches. Different versions exist: Star 63D (used on PAM-D2), Star 63DV and Star 63F. It was used to launch payloads from the Space Shuttle, and as stage on the Titan 34D and Delta 7925 rockets.

Thiokol Star-63 family
Name	Thiokol#	Mass (kg)		Prop. mass fract.	Imp.		Burn (s)
Name	Thiokol#	Total	Empty	Prop. mass fract.	Spec., I_{sp} (s)	Tot. (kNs)	Burn (s)
Star 63D	TU-936	3499.1	248.4	0.929	283.0	9043.23	118
Star 63DV							118
Star 63F	TE-M-963	4590.4	325.9	0.929	297.1	12530.64	120

== Sources ==
- Northrop Grumman (2022). Propulsion Products Catalog. Northrop Grumman.
