= Burner (rocket stage) =

Rocket stage which can be used as a space tug

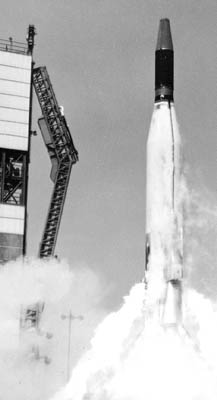
Atlas-F Burner-2 launching Radcat and Radsat on 02.10.1972

The Burner, Burner II, and Burner IIA rocket stages have been used as upper stages of launch vehicles such as the Thor-Burner and Delta since 1965.

== Burner I ==
The Burner I stage (also called the Altair stage) was derived from the fourth stage of the Scout launch vehicle, and was powered by a Star 37 solid rocket motor (Thiokol TE 364-1).

== Burner II ==
In September 1965, Air Force Space Systems Division announced the development of a new, low cost upper stage called Burner II, powered by Thiokol TE-M-364-2 engine. It was intended as the smallest maneuverable upper stage in the Air Force inventory. In June 1967, the first Thor/Burner II vehicle successfully launched a pair of satellites to orbit.

In June 1971, the last of the Burner II missions was launched from Vandenberg by a Thor/Burner II launch vehicle and carried an SESP-1 space environmental satellite.

In the mid-1970s Burner II was also studied for use as an upper stage in combination with the Space Shuttle. NASA managers choose other solutions for missions where upper stages were required.

== Burner IIA ==
In June 1969, the Space and Missile Systems Organization (SAMSO) began development of the Burner IIA configuration which would offer a tandem motor injection capability and almost twice the capability of Burner II.

In addition to use on Delta family rockets, Burner II stages have been used on both Atlas and Titan rockets. Atlas E/F vehicles were configured with a Burner II/IIA stage and launched in 1968 and 1972. The first launch failed with the second delivering a radiation research payload for the Space Test Program (P72-1 Radsat) using Burner IIA.
