= Comparison of retired orbital launch vehicles =

Retired orbital launch vehicles have been instrumental in the history of space exploration, enabling the deployment of satellites, scientific instruments, and crewed missions. Representing decades of technological progress, these systems reflect the contributions of various nations, including the United States, Soviet Union, members of the European Space Agency (ESA), China, India, and Japan. The specifications, achievements, and legacy of these vehicles illustrate the foundations upon which modern space launch technologies have been built.

== Retired rockets ==
Vehicle	Origin	Manufacturer	Height	Mass to ... (kg)			Reuse	Launches (+ suborbital)	Launch Sites	Date of flight	
Vehicle	Origin	Manufacturer	Height	LEO	GTO	Other	Reuse	Launches (+ suborbital)	Launch Sites	First	Last
Antares 110–130	United States	Orbital	40.5-41.9 m	5,100		1,500 to SSO	No	5	(United States) MARS	2013	2014
Antares 230 / 230+	United States	Northrop Grumman	42.5 m	8,200		3,000 to SSO (Note: Reference altitude 500 km)	No	13	(United States) MARS	2016	2023
Ariane 1	Europe	Aérospatiale	49.1 m		1,830		No	11	(France) CSG	1979	1986
Ariane 2	Europe	Aérospatiale	49.1 m		2,270		No	6	(France) CSG	1986	1989
Ariane 3	Europe	Aérospatiale	49.1 m		2,650		No	11	(France) CSG	1984	1989
Ariane 4 40	Europe	Aérospatiale	58.7 m	4,600	2,105	2,740 to SSO	No	7	(France) CSG	1990	1999
Ariane 4 42L	Europe	Aérospatiale	58.7 m	7,000	3,480	4,500 to SSO	No	13	(France) CSG	1993	2002
Ariane 4 42P	Europe	Aérospatiale	58.7 m	6,000	2,930	3,400 to SSO	No	15	(France) CSG	1990	2002
Ariane 4 44L	Europe	Aérospatiale	58.7 m	7,000	4,720	6,000 to SSO	No	40	(France) CSG	1989	2003
Ariane 4 44LP	Europe	Aérospatiale	58.7 m	7,000	4,220	5,000 to SSO	No	26	(France) CSG	1988	2001
Ariane 4 44P	Europe	Aérospatiale	58.7 m	6,500	3,465	4,100 to SSO	No	15	(France) CSG	1991	2001
Ariane 5 G	Europe	EADS Astrium	47.5 m	18,000	6,900		No	16	(France) CSG	1996	2003
Ariane 5 G+	Europe	EADS Astrium	47.8 m		7,100		No	3	(France) CSG	2004	2004
Ariane 5 GS	Europe	EADS Astrium	47.8 m	16,000	6,600		No	6	(France) CSG	2005	2009
Ariane 5 ES	Europe	EADS Astrium	50.7 m	21,000	8,000		No	8	(France) CSG	2008	2018
Ariane 5 ECA	Europe	EADS Astrium	52.6 m	21,000	11,210		No	84	(France) CSG	2002	2023
ASLV	India	ISRO	23.5 m	150			No	4	(India) SDSC	1987	1994
Athena I LLV-1	United States	Lockheed Martin	18.4 m	500			No	1	(United States) VAFB	1995	1995
Athena I	United States	Lockheed Martin	18.9 m	795	515		No	3	(United States) VAFB, (United States) CCSFS, (United States) KLC	1997	2001
Athena II	United States	Lockheed Martin	28.2 m	1,800			No	3	(United States) VAFB, (United States) CCSFS	1998	1999
Atlas-Able	United States	General Dynamics	28 m			~175 to TLI	No	3	(United States) CCSFS	1959	1960
Atlas-Agena	United States	Convair/General Dynamics	36 m	1,000		390 to TLI	No	109	(United States) VAFB, (United States) CCSFS	1960	1978
Atlas-Centaur	United States	Lockheed	36.2-38.8 m	1,134	2,222		No	148	(United States) CCSFS	1962	1983
Atlas B	United States	Lockheed Martin	24.9 m	~4,000			No	10	(United States) CCSFS	1958	1959
Atlas-D OV1	United States	Convair/General Dynamics	25.9 m	1,400			No	7	(United States) VAFB	1965	1967
Atlas E/F-Agena	United States	Convair/General Dynamics/Lockheed	34 m	1,000		390 to TLI	No	1	(United States) VAFB	1978	1978
Atlas E/F-Altair-3A	United States	Convair/General Dynamics	27.3 m	210			No	1	(United States) VAFB	1990	1990
Atlas E/F-Burner-2	United States	Convair/General Dynamics	28.9 m	950			No	1	(United States) VAFB	1972	1972
Atlas E/F-MSD	United States	Convair/General Dynamics	27.3 m	800			No	4	(United States) VAFB	1976	1980
Atlas E/F-OIS	United States	Convair/General Dynamics	28.7 m	870			No	2	(United States) VAFB	1979	1985
Atlas E/F-OV1	United States	Convair/General Dynamics	26.5 m	363			No	4	(United States) VAFB	1968	1971
Atlas E/F-PTS	United States	Convair/General Dynamics	26.5 m	295			No	1	(United States) VAFB	1974	1974
Atlas E/F-SGS-1	United States	Convair/General Dynamics	29 m	450			No	8	(United States) VAFB	1977	1981
Atlas E/F-SGS-2	United States	Convair/General Dynamics	29 m	770			No	4	(United States) VAFB	1983	1985
Atlas E/F-Star-17A	United States	Convair/General Dynamics	27.4 m	N/A		800 to MPEO	No	1	(United States) VAFB	1975	1975
Atlas E/F-Star-37S	United States	Convair/General Dynamics	29 m	N/A		1,100 to SSO	No	19	(United States) VAFB	1978	1995
Atlas-F Agena-D	United States	Convair/General Dynamics	34 m	N/A		2,300 to Polar	No	1	(United States) VAFB	1978	1978
Atlas G	United States	Lockheed	43.9 m	5,900	2,222	1,179 to HCO	No	7	(United States) CCSFS	1984	1989
Atlas H MSD	United States	Lockheed	27 m	3,630			No	5	(United States) VAFB	1983	1987
Atlas LV-3B	United States	Convair	28.7 m	1,360			No	9	(United States) CCSFS	1960	1963
Atlas SLV-3	United States	Convair	33.3 m				No	63	(United States) VAFB, (United States) CCSFS	1966	1983
Atlas SLV-3 Burner-2	United States	Convair	30.3 m	~1,000			No	1	(United States) VAFB	1968	1968
Atlas I	United States	Lockheed Martin	43.9 m	5,900	2,340		No	11	(United States) CCSFS	1990	1997
Atlas II	United States	Lockheed Martin	47.5 m	6,780	2,810	2,000 to HCO	No	10	(United States) VAFB, (United States) CCSFS	1991	1998
Atlas IIA	United States	Lockheed Martin	47.5 m	7,316	3,180	2,160 to HCO	No	23	(United States) VAFB, (United States) CCSFS	1992	2002
Atlas IIAS	United States	Lockheed Martin	49 m	8,618	3,833	2,680 to HCO	No	30	(United States) VAFB, (United States) CCSFS	1993	2004
Atlas IIIA	United States	Lockheed Martin	52.5 m	8,686	4,060	2,970 to HCO	No	2	(United States) CCSFS	2000	2004
Atlas IIIB/DEC	United States	Lockheed Martin	53.7 m	10,759	4,609		No	1	(United States) CCSFS	2002	2002
Atlas IIIB/SEC	United States	Lockheed Martin	54.7 m	10,218	4,193		No	3	(United States) CCSFS	2003	2005
Atlas V 401	United States	ULA	57.3 m	9,050	4,950	6,670 to SSO	No	41	(United States) VAFB, (United States) CCSFS	2002	2022
Atlas V 411	United States	ULA	58.2 m	9,050	6,075	8,495 to SSO	No	6	(United States) VAFB, (United States) CCSFS	2006	2020
Atlas V 421	United States	ULA	59.1 m	9,050	7,000	9,050 to SSO	No	9	(United States) VAFB, (United States) CCSFS	2007	2022
Atlas V 431	United States	ULA	59.1 m	9,050	7,800	9,050 to SSO	No	3	(United States) VAFB, (United States) CCSFS	2005	2016
Atlas V 501	United States	ULA	62.5 m	8,250	3,970	5,945 to SSO; 1,500 to GEO	No	8	(United States) VAFB, (United States) CCSFS	2010	2023
Atlas V 511	United States	ULA	62.5 m	11,000	5,250	7,820 to SSO 1,750 to GEO	No	1	(United States) VAFB, (United States) CCSFS	2022	2022
Atlas V 521	United States	ULA	59.7 m	13,300	6,485	9,585 to SSO 2,760 to GEO	No	2	(United States) VAFB, (United States) CCSFS	2003	2004
Atlas V 531	United States	ULA	59.7 m	15,300	7,425	11,160 to SSO 3,250 to GEO	No	5	(United States) VAFB, (United States) CCSFS	2010	2022
Atlas V 541	United States	ULA	59.7 m	17,100	8,240	12,435 to SSO 3,730 to GEO	No	9	(United States) VAFB, (United States) CCSFS	2011	2022
Black Arrow	United Kingdom	RAE	13 m	73			No	2 (+2)	(Australia) WRC	1969 (Note: First suborbital test in 1969, first orbital launch attempt in 1970)	1971
Blue Scout II	United States	Vought	24 m	30			No	3	(United States) CCSFS	1961	1961
Ceres-1 (1) (Note: Despite not being officially acknowledged by the manufacturer, significant changes between different iterations of the rocket lead to the identification of different variants.)	China	Galactic Energy	18.5 m	350			No	1	(China) JSLC	2020	2020
Ceres-1 (2)	China	Galactic Energy	19.5 m	400			No	1	(China) JSLC	2021	2021
Commercial Titan III	United States	Martin Marietta	47.3 m	13,100			No	4	(United States) CCSFS	1990	1992
Conestoga 1620	United States	Space Services	15.2 m	1179			No	1	(United States) MARS	1995	1995
Diamant A	France	SEREB	18.9 m	80			No	4	(France) CIEES	1965	1967
Diamant B	France	SEREB	23.5 m	115			No	5	(France) CSG	1970	1973
Diamant BP4	France	SEREB	21.6 m	153			No	3	(France) CSG	1975	1975
Delta 0300	United States	McDonnell Douglas	34 m		340	747 to SSO	No	3	(United States) VAFB	1972	1973
Delta 0900	United States	McDonnell Douglas	34 m	1,300		818 to SSO	No	2	(United States) VAFB	1972	1972
Delta 1410	United States	McDonnell Douglas	35.2 m	340			No	1	(United States) VAFB	1975	1975
Delta 1604	United States	McDonnell Douglas	35.2 m	390			No	2	(United States) CCSFS	1972	1973
Delta 1900	United States	McDonnell Douglas	35.2 m	1,800			No	1	(United States) VAFB	1973	1973
Delta 1910	United States	McDonnell Douglas	35.2 m	1,066			No	1	(United States) CCSFS	1975	1975
Delta 1913	United States	McDonnell Douglas	35.2 m	328			No	1	(United States) CCSFS	1973	1973
Delta 1914	United States	McDonnell Douglas	35.2 m		680		No	2	(United States) CCSFS	1972	1973
Delta 2310	United States	McDonnell Douglas	35.2 m	336			No	3	(United States) VAFB, (United States) CCSFS	1974	1981
Delta 2313	United States	McDonnell Douglas	35.2 m			243 to GEO	No	3	(United States) VAFB, (United States) CCSFS	1974	1977
Delta 2910	United States	McDonnell Douglas	35.2 m	1,887			No	6	(United States) VAFB, (United States) CCSFS	1975	1978
Delta 2913	United States	McDonnell Douglas	35.2 m	2,000	700		No	6	(United States) VAFB, (United States) CCSFS	1975	1976
Delta 2914	United States	McDonnell Douglas	35.2 m		724		No	30	(United States) VAFB, (United States) CCSFS	1974	1979
Delta 3910	United States	McDonnell Douglas	35.2 m	2,494	1,154 with PAM-D		No	10	(United States) VAFB, (United States) CCSFS	1980	1988
Delta 3913	United States	McDonnell Douglas	35.2 m	816			No	1	(United States) VAFB, (United States) CCSFS	1981	1981
Delta 3914	United States	McDonnell Douglas	35.2 m		954		No	13	(United States) VAFB, (United States) CCSFS	1975	1987
Delta 3920	United States	McDonnell Douglas	35.2 m	3,452	1,284 with PAM-D		No	10	(United States) VAFB, (United States) CCSFS	1982	1989
Delta 3924	United States	McDonnell Douglas	35.2 m		1,104		No	4	(United States) VAFB, (United States) CCSFS	1982	1984
Delta 4925	United States	McDonnell Douglas	35.2 m	3,400	1,312		No	2	(United States) VAFB, (United States) CCSFS	1989	1990
Delta 5920	United States	McDonnell Douglas	35.2 m	3,848			No	1	(United States) VAFB	1989	1989
Delta II 6920	United States	McDonnell Douglas	38.8 m	3,983			No	3	(United States) VAFB, (United States) CCSFS	1990	1992
Delta II 6925	United States	McDonnell Douglas	39.4 m	1,447	1,447		No	14	(United States) VAFB, (United States) CCSFS	1989	1992
Delta II 7320	United States	Boeing IDS / ULA	38.9 m	2,865		1,651 to SSO	No	12	(United States) VAFB, (United States) CCSFS	1999	2015
Delta II 7326	United States	Boeing IDS	38.4 m		934	636 to TLI 629 to HCO	No	3	(United States) VAFB, (United States) CCSFS	1998	2001
Delta II 7420	United States	ULA	39 m	3,185		1,966 to SSO	No	14	(United States) VAFB, (United States) CCSFS	1998	2018
Delta II 7425	United States	Boeing IDS	39 m		1,100	804 to HCO	No	4	(United States) VAFB, (United States) CCSFS	1998	2002
Delta II 7426	United States	Boeing IDS	39 m		1,058	734 to TLI 711 to HCO	No	1	(United States) VAFB, (United States) CCSFS	1999	1999
Delta II 7920	United States	Boeing IDS / ULA	39.4 m	5,030		3,123 to SSO	No	29	(United States) VAFB, (United States) CCSFS	1998	2017
Delta II 7925	United States	Boeing IDS / ULA	39.4 m		1,819	1,177 to TLI 1,265 to HCO	No	69	(United States) VAFB, (United States) CCSFS	1990	2009
Delta II-H 7920H	United States	Boeing IDS / ULA	39 m	6,097			No	3	(United States) VAFB, (United States) CCSFS	2003	2011
Delta II-H 7925H	United States	Boeing IDS / ULA	39.8 m		2,171	1,508 to HCO	No	3	(United States) VAFB, (United States) CCSFS	2003	2007
Delta III 8930	United States	Boeing IDS	39 m	8,292	3,810		No	3	(United States) CCSFS	1998	2000
Delta IV Heavy	United States	ULA	72 m	28,370	14,210	23,560 to polar 11,290 to TLI 8,000 to TMI	No	16	(United States) VAFB, (United States) CCSFS	2004	2024
Delta IV M	United States	Boeing IDS	61.3 m	9,440	4,440	7,690 to polar	No	3	(United States) VAFB, (United States) CCSFS	2003	2006
Delta IV M+(4,2)	United States	ULA	61.3 m	13,140	6,390	10,250 to polar	No	14	(United States) VAFB, (United States) CCSFS	2002	2019
Delta IV M+(5,2)	United States	ULA	65.5 m	11,470	5,490	9,600 to polar	No	3	(United States) VAFB, (United States) CCSFS	2012	2018
Delta IV M+(5,4)	United States	ULA	65.5 m	14,140	7,300	11,600 to polar	No	8	(United States) VAFB, (United States) CCSFS	2009	2019
Dnepr	Ukraine	Yuzhmash	34.3 m	3,700			No	22	(Kazakhstan) Baikonur, (Russia) Yasny	1999	2015
Energia (Note: Without Buran, and assuming payload providing orbital insertion)	Soviet Union	NPO Energia	58.8 m	105,000		20,000 to GEO 32,000 to TLI	No	1 (failed to orbit)	(Soviet Union) Baikonur	1987	1987
Energia-Buran	Soviet Union	NPO Energia NPO Molniya	58.8 m	30,000 (Note: The U.S. Space Shuttle Transportation System and the Soviet Energia-Buran system consist of launch vehicle rockets and returnable spaceplane orbiter. Payload values listed here are for the mass of the payload in cargo bay of the spaceplanes, excluding the mass of the spaceplanes themselves.)			Yes	1	(Soviet Union) Baikonur	1988	1988
Epsilon	Japan	IHI	24.4 m	1,200	N/A	450 to SSO	No	1	(Japan) KSC	2013	2022
Epsilon (enhanced)	Japan	IHI	26 m	1,500	N/A	590 to SSO	No	6	(Japan) KSC		
Europa I	Europe	ELDO	31.7 m	1,440	200		No	3	(Australia) WRC	1968	1970
Europa II	Europe	ELDO	31.7 m		360		No	1	(France) CSG	1971	1971
Falcon 1	United States	SpaceX	21 m	470			No	5	(United States) Omelek	2006	2009
Falcon 9 v1.0	United States	SpaceX	54.9 m	9,000	3,400		No	5	(United States) CCSFS	2010	2013
Falcon 9 v1.1	United States	SpaceX	68.4 m	13,150 (Note: The SpaceX website lists the F9 payload to LEO as 13,150kg. The payload to GTO is listed as 4,850kg. However, SpaceX has stated that these numbers include a 30% margin to accommodate re-usability.)	4,850		No	15	(United States) VAFB, (United States) CCSFS	2013	2016
Falcon 9 Full Thrust	United States	SpaceX	70.8 m	17,400	5,500	9,600 to polar	Yes	36	(United States) VAFB, (United States) CCSFS, (United States) KSC	2015	2018
Falcon 9 Full Thrust	United States	SpaceX	70.8 m	22,800	8,300	9,600 to polar	No	36	(United States) VAFB, (United States) CCSFS, (United States) KSC	2015	2018
Feng Bao 1	China	Shanghai Bureau No.2	33 m	2,500			No	8 (+3)	(China) JSLC	1972	1981
GSLV Mk.I(a)	India	ISRO	49.1 m	5,000	1,540		No	1	(India) SDSC	2001	2001
GSLV Mk.I(b)	India	ISRO	49.1 m	5,000	2,150		No	4	(India) SDSC	2003	2007
GSLV Mk.I(c)	India	ISRO	49.1 m	5,000			No	1	(India) SDSC	2010	2010
H-I	Japan United States	Mitsubishi	42 m	1,400			No	9	(Japan) TNSC	1986	1992
H-II / IIS	Japan	Mitsubishi	49 m	10,060	4,000		No	7	(Japan) TNSC	1994	1999
H-IIA 202	Japan	Mitsubishi	53 m	10,000	4,000	5,100 to SSO (Note: 5,100 kg to a 500-km Sun-synchronous orbit; 3,300 kg to 800 km)	No	35	(Japan) TNSC	2001	2025
H-IIA 204	Japan	Mitsubishi	53 m	15,000	5,950		No	5	(Japan) TNSC	2006	2021
H-IIA 2022	Japan	Mitsubishi	53 m		4,500		No	3	(Japan) TNSC	2005	2007
H-IIA 2024	Japan	Mitsubishi	57 m	11,000	5,000		No	7	(Japan) TNSC	2002	2008
H-IIB	Japan	Mitsubishi	56.6 m	16,500 (ISS)	8,000		No	8	(Japan) TNSC	2009	2020
Hyperbola-1 (1) (Note: Despite not being officially acknowledged by the manufacturer, significant changes between different iterations of the rocket lead to the identification of different variants.)	China	i-Space	20.9 m	260			No	1	(China) JSLC	2019	2019
Juno I	United States	Chrysler	21.2 m	11			No	1	(United States) CCSFS	1958	1959
Juno II	United States	Chrysler	24 m	41		6 to TLI	No	10	(United States) CCSFS	1958	1961
Kaituozhe-1	China	CALT	13.6 m	40			No	2	(China) JSLC	2002	2003
Kaituozhe-2	China	CASC	16.8 m	800			No	1	(China) JSLC	2017	2017
Kosmos	Soviet Union	NPO Polyot	29.6 m	350			No	38	(Soviet Union) Kapustin Yar	1961	1967
Kosmos-1	Soviet Union	NPO Polyot	26.3 m	1,400			No	8	(Soviet Union) Baikonur	1964	1965
Kosmos-2	Soviet Union	NPO Polyot	31 m	300			No	127	(Soviet Union) Kapustin Yar, (Soviet Union) Plesetsk	1965	1977
Kosmos-3	Soviet Union	NPO Polyot	32.4 m	1,400			No	6	(Soviet Union) Baikonur	1966	1968
Kosmos-3M	Soviet Union Russia	NPO Polyot	32.4 m	1,500			No	445	(Russia) Kapustin Yar, (Russia) Plesetsk	1967	2010
Kosmos-3MRB	Soviet Union	NPO Polyot	32.4 m	1,500			No	10	(Soviet Union) Kapustin Yar	1980	1988
Lambda 4S	Japan	Nissan Motors	16.5 m	26			No	5	(Japan) KSC	1966	1970
LauncherOne	United States	Virgin Orbit	21.3 m	500		300 to SSO	No	6	(United States) Mojave, (United Kingdom) Cornwall	2020	2023
Long March 1	China	CALT	29.9 m	300			No	2	(China) JSLC	1970	1971
Long March 1D	China	CALT	28.2 m	740			No	0 (+3)	(China) TSLC	1995 (Note: Suborbital test flights in 1995, 1997 and 2002, no orbital launches attempted)	2002
Long March 2A	China	CALT	32 m	2,000			No	4	(China) JSLC	1974	1978
Long March 2E	China	CALT	49.7 m	9,200			No	7	(China) XSLC	1990	1995
Long March 3	China	CALT	43.3 m	5,000			No	13	(China) XSLC	1984	2000
Long March 3B	China	CALT	54.8 m	11,200	5,100	5,700 to SSO	No	12	(China) XSLC	1996	2012
Long March 4A	China	CALT	41.9 m	4,000			No	2	(China) TSLC	1988	1990
M-V	Japan	Nissan Motors (1997–2000) IHI Aerospace (2000–2006)	30.8 m	1,850			No	7	(Japan) KSC	1997	2006
Molniya	Soviet Union	RSC Energia	43.4 m	1,800			No	40	(Soviet Union) Baikonur, (Soviet Union) Plesetsk	1960	1967
Molniya-M	Soviet Union Russia	RSC Energia	43.4 m	2,400			No	280	(Kazakhstan) Baikonur, (Russia) Plesetsk	1965	2010
Mu-4S	Japan	Nissan Motors	23.6 m	180			No	4	(Japan) KSC	1971	1972
Mu-3C	Japan	Nissan Motors	20.3 m	195			No	4	(Japan) KSC	1974	1979
Mu-3H	Japan	Nissan Motors	23.8 m	300			No	3	(Japan) KSC	1977	1978
Mu-3S	Japan	Nissan Motors	23.8 m	300			No	4	(Japan) KSC	1980	1984
Mu-3SII	Japan	Nissan Motors	27.8 m	770			No	8	(Japan) KSC	1985	1995
N1	Soviet Union	NPO Energia	105.3 m	95,000 (Note: The N1 rocket was initially designed for 75 t LEO capacity and launch attempts were made with this version, but there were studies to increase the payload capacity to 90–95 t, if a liquid-hydrogen upper stage engine could be developed.)			No	4	(Soviet Union) Baikonur	1969	1972
N-I	Japan United States	Mitsubishi	34 m	1,200			No	7	(Japan) TNSC	1975	1982
N-II	Japan United States	Mitsubishi	35 m	2,000			No	8	(Japan) TNSC	1981	1987
Naro-1	South Korea Russia	KARI Khrunichev	33 m	100			No	3	(South Korea) Naro	2009	2013
OS-M1	China	OneSpace	19 m	205		143 to SSO	No	1	(China) JSLC	2019 (Note: A suborbital test flight was conducted in May 2018.)	2019
Paektusan-1	North Korea	KCST	25.8 m	20			No	1	(North Korea) Tonghae	1998	1998
Pegasus	United States	Northrop Grumman	15.4 m	455			No	6	(United States) Edwards, (United States) CCSFS	1990	1994
Pegasus H	United States	Northrop Grumman	15.4 m	544			No	4	(United States) VAFB, (United States) CCSFS, (Marshall Islands) Kwajalein Atoll	1995	2000
Pilot II	United States	United States Navy	4.4 m	N/A		1.05 to MEO	No	10	(United States) Point Mugu	1958	1958
Polyot	Soviet Union	RSC Energia	30 m	1,400			No	2	(Soviet Union) Baikonur	1963	1964
Proton (UR-500)	Soviet Union	Khrunichev	39.8 m	12,200			No	4	(Soviet Union) Baikonur	1965	1966
Proton-K	Soviet Union Russia	Khrunichev	50 m	19,760	4,930		No	311	(Kazakhstan) Baikonur	1965	2012
PSLV-G	India	ISRO	44 m	3,200	1,050	1,600 to SSO	No	12	(India) SDSC	1993	2016
Rocket 3.0	United States	Astra	11.6 m	100			No	1	(United States) KLC	2020	2020
Rocket 3.1	United States	Astra	11.6 m	100			No	1	(United States) KLC	2020	2020
Rocket 3.2	United States	Astra	11.6 m	100			No	1	(United States) KLC	2020	2020
Rocket 3.3	United States	Astra	13.1 m	100		150 to SSO	No	5	(United States) CCSFS, (United States) KLC	2021	2022
Rokot-K	Russia	Khrunichev	25.5 m				No	4	(Kazakhstan) Baikonur, (Russia) Plesetsk	1990	1999
Rokot-KM	Russia	Khrunichev	29.1 m	1,950		1,200 to SSO	No	31	(Russia) Plesetsk	2000	2019
RS1 B1	United States	ABL Space Systems	27 m	1,350	400	975 to SSO 750 to MEO	No	1	(United States) KLC	2023	2023
Safir-1	Iran	Iranian Space Agency	22.6 m	27			No	2	(Iran) Semnan	2008	2009
Safir-1A	Iran	Iranian Space Agency	22.6 m	15			No	1	(Iran) Semnan	2011	2011
Safir-1B	Iran	Iranian Space Agency	22.6 m	50			No	1	(Iran) Semnan	2012	2012
Safir-1B+	Iran	Iranian Space Agency	22.6 m	52			No	5	(Iran) Semnan	2012	2019
Saturn I	United States	Chrysler (S-I) Douglas (S-IV)	50-57.4 m	9,000			No	10	(United States) CCSFS	1961	1965
Saturn IB	United States	Chrysler (S-IB) Douglas (S-IVB)	56.1-68.1 m	18,600			No	9	(United States) CCSFS, (United States) KSC	1966	1975
Saturn V	United States	Boeing (S-IC) North American (S-II) Douglas (S-IVB)	110.6 m	140,000		47,000 to TLI	No	13 (Note: The Saturn V made 13 launches, 12 of which reached the correct orbits, and the other (Apollo 6) reached a different orbit than the one which had been planned; however, some mission objectives could still be completed; NASA, Saturn V News Reference, Appendix: Saturn V Flight History (1968) Archived 2011-05-17 at the Wayback Machine. For more information, see the Saturn V article. The Saturn V launch record is usually quoted as having never failed, e.g. "The rocket was masterminded by Wernher Von Braun and did not fail in any of its flights", Alan Lawrie and Robert Godwin; Saturn, but the Apollo 6 launch should be considered a partial mission failure. The 13th launch of Saturn V was in special configuration (SA-513) with the Skylab.)	(United States) KSC	1967	1973
Scout X-1	United States	Vought	21.8 m	59			No	4	(United States) WFF	1960	1961
Scout X-2	United States	Vought	21.8 m	76			No	1	(United States) VAFB, (United States) WFF	1962	1962
Scout X-2M	United States	Vought	21.8 m	76			No	3	(United States) VAFB	1962	1963
Scout X-2B	United States	Vought	21.8 m	76			No	1	(United States) VAFB	1963	1963
Scout X-3	United States	Vought	21.8 m	87			No	5	(United States) VAFB, (United States) WFF	1962	1964
Scout X-3M	United States	Vought	21.8 m	87			No	1	(United States) VAFB	1963	1963
Scout X-4	United States	Vought	22.8 m	103			No	11	(United States) VAFB, (United States) WFF	1963	1965
Scout A	United States	NASA	22.8 m	110			No	11	(United States) VAFB	1965	1970
Scout A-1	United States	NASA	22.8 m	122			No	1	(United States) VAFB	1973	1973
Scout B	United States	NASA	22.8 m	110			No	20	(Italy) BSC, (United States) VAFB, (United States) WFF	1965	1971
Scout B-1	United States	NASA	22.8 m	143			No	5	(Italy) BSC, (United States) VAFB, (United States) WFF	1971	1976
Scout D-1	United States	NASA	22.9 m	182			No	14	(Italy) BSC, (United States) VAFB, (United States) WFF	1972	1979
Scout E-1	United States	NASA	22.8 m	193			No	1	(United States) VAFB	1974	1974
Scout F-1	United States	NASA	22.9 m	192			No	2	(Italy) BSC, (United States) VAFB	1975	1975
Scout G-1	United States	NASA	22.9 m	208			No	18	(Italy) BSC, (United States) VAFB, (United States) WFF	1979	1994
Shavit	Israel	IAI	17.7 m	160			No	2	(Israel) Palmachim	1988	1990
Shavit-1	Israel	IAI	19.7 m	225			No	4	(Israel) Palmachim	1995	2004
Shtil-1	Russia	Makeyev	14.8 m	280–420			No	2	(Russia) Novomoskovsk, (Russia) Ekaterinburg	1998	2006
SLV-3	India	ISRO	22 m	40			No	4	(India) SDSC	1979	1983
Soyuz	Soviet Union	RSC Energia	45.6 m	6,450			No	31	(Soviet Union) Baikonur	1966	1976
Soyuz-FG	Russia	TsSKB-Progress	49.5 m	6,900			No	70	(Kazakhstan) Baikonur	2001	2019
Soyuz-L	Soviet Union	RSC Energia	50 m	5,500			No	3	(Soviet Union) Baikonur	1970	1971
Soyuz-M	Soviet Union	RSC Energia	50 m	6,600			No	8	(Soviet Union) Baikonur	1971	1976
Soyuz ST-A	Russia Europe	TsSKB-Progress Arianespace	46.3 m	7,800 from Kourou	2,810 with Fregat		No	9	(France) CSG	2011	2021
Soyuz ST-B	Russia Europe	TsSKB-Progress Arianespace	46.3 m	9,000 from Kourou	3,250 with Fregat	4,400 to SSO	No	18	(France) CSG	2011	2022
Soyuz-U	Soviet Union Russia	TsSKB-Progress	51.1 m	6,650 from Baikonour 6,150 from Plesetsk			No	786	(Kazakhstan) Baikonur, (Russia) Plesetsk	1973	2017
Soyuz-U2	Soviet Union Russia	TsSKB-Progress	34.5 m	7,050			No	72	(Kazakhstan) Baikonur	1982	1995
Space Shuttle	United States	ATK (SRBs) Martin Marietta (External tank) Rockwell (Orbiter)	56.1 m	24,400	4,944 with IUS; 1,200 with PAM-D	3,550 to escape with IUS	Yes	135	(United States) KSC	1981	2011
SPARK	United States	UHAerojet RocketdyneSandia	17 m	300			No	1	(United States) Barking Sands	2015	2015
Sparta	United States	ABMA/Chrysler	21.8 m	45			No	10	(Australia) WRC	1966	1967
Sputnik 8K71PS	Soviet Union	RSC Energia	30 m	500			No	2	(Soviet Union) Baikonur	1957	1957
Sputnik 8A91	Soviet Union	RSC Energia	31.1 m	1,327			No	2	(Soviet Union) Baikonur	1958	1958
SS-520	Japan	IHI Aerospace	9.5 m	4			No	2	(Japan) KSC	2017 (Note: A prior version of the SS-520 flew twice as a suborbital sounding rocket in 1998 and 2000. In 2017, the addition of a small third stage enabled orbital launches of ultra-light nano- or picosatellites.)	2018
Start-1	Russia	MITT	22.7 m	532		250 to SSO	No	5	(Russia) Svobodny, (Russia) Plesetsk	1993	2006
Start-1.2	Russia	MITT	22.7 m			250-300 to SSO	No	1	(Russia) Svobodny	1997	1997
Start	Russia	MITT	28.9 m			300 to SSO	No	1	(Russia) Plesetsk	1995	1995
Strela	Russia	Khrunichev	24- 27.4 m	1,400			No	3	(Kazakhstan) Baikonur	2003	2014
Taurus-1110	United States	Orbital Sciences, Orbital ATK	28.2 m	1180	370	750 to SSO	No	3	(United States) VAFB	1994	2000
Taurus-2110	United States	Orbital Sciences, Orbital ATK	29.1 m	1250	375	900 to SSO	No	2	(United States) VAFB	1999	2001
Taurus-2210	United States	Orbital Sciences, Orbital ATK	30.9 m	1050		700 to SSO	No	1	(United States) VAFB	1998	1998
Taurus-3110	United States	Orbital Sciences, Orbital ATK	30.1 m	1450	445	1,050 to SSO	No	2	(United States) VAFB	2009	2011
Taurus-3210	United States	Northrop Grumman	27.9 m	1,458	N/A	1,054 to SSO (Note: Reference altitude 400 km)	No	1	(United States) VAFB	2004	2004
Terran 1	United States	Relativity Space	35.2 m	1,250		900 to SSO	No	1	(United States) CCSFS	2023	2023
Thor-Able I	United States	Douglas/Aerojet	26.9 m	250			No	3	(United States) CCSFS	1958	1958
Thor-Able II	United States	Douglas/Aerojet	27.3 m	270			No	4	(United States) CCSFS	1959	1960
Thor-Able III	United States	Douglas/Aerojet	27.4 m			~64 to HEO	No	1	(United States) CCSFS	1959	1959
Thor-Able IV	United States	Douglas/Aerojet	27.2 m			~43 to Heliocentric	No	1	(United States) CCSFS	1960	1960
Thor Agena-A	United States	Douglas/Lockheed	22.7 m	860			No	16	(United States) VAFB	1959	1960
Thor Agena-B	United States	Douglas/Lockheed	26.3 m	1,200			No	21	(United States) VAFB	1962	1965
Thor Agena-D	United States	Douglas/Lockheed	29.3 m	1,150			No	22	(United States) VAFB	1962	1967
Thorad SLV-2G Agena D	United States	Douglas/Lockheed	32.9 m	2,000			No	30	(United States) VAFB	1966	1971
Thorad SLV-2H Agena D	United States	Douglas/Lockheed	34 m	2,000			No	13	(United States) VAFB	1969	1972
Thor-Burner-1 MG-18	United States	Douglas	23 m	770		150-300 to MEO	No	2	(United States) VAFB	1965	1965
Thor-Burner-1 Altair-3	United States	Douglas	~24 m	>73			No	4	(United States) VAFB	1965	1966
Thor-Burner-2	United States	Douglas	22.4 m			250 to MEO	No	12	(United States) VAFB	1966	1971
Thor-Burner-2A	United States	Douglas	23.5 m			300 to MEO	No	8	(United States) VAFB	1971	1976
Thor-Delta	United States	Douglas	31 m	226	45		No	12	(United States) CCSFS	1960	1962
Thor-Delta A	United States	Douglas	31 m	250	68		No	2	(United States) CCSFS	1962	1962
Thor-Delta B	United States	Douglas	31 m	370	68		No	9	(United States) CCSFS	1962	1964
Thor-Delta C	United States	Douglas	27.5 m	81			No	11	(United States) CCSFS	1963	1967
Thor-Delta C1	United States	Douglas	27.5 m	81			No	2	(United States) CCSFS	1966	1969
Thor-Delta D	United States	Douglas	32 m	450	104		No	2	(United States) CCSFS	1964	1965
Thor-Delta E	United States	Douglas	31 m	540	150		No	6	(United States) VAFB, (United States) CCSFS	1965	1967
Thor-Delta E1	United States	Douglas	28 m	540	205		No	17	(United States) VAFB, (United States) CCSFS	1966	1971
Thor-Delta G	United States	Douglas	30 m	650			No	2	(United States) CCSFS	1966	1967
Thor-Delta J	United States	Douglas	31 m	260	263		No	1	(United States) VAFB	1968	1968
Thor-Delta L	United States	Douglas	35 m	356	300		No	2	(United States) VAFB, (United States) CCSFS	1969	1972
Thor-Delta M	United States	Douglas	34 m	356	355		No	12	(United States) CCSFS	1968	1971
Thor-Delta M6	United States	Douglas	32.4 m	454	450		No	1	(United States) CCSFS	1971	1971
Thor-Delta N	United States	Douglas	33 m	900			No	6	(United States) VAFB, (United States) CCSFS	1968	1972
Thor-Delta N6	United States	Douglas	33 m	1,600			No	3	(United States) VAFB	1970	1971
Thor-DM21 Able-Star	United States	Douglas/Aerojet	29 m	150			No	11	(United States) CCSFS	1960	1962
Thor-DSV2A Able-Star	United States	Douglas/Aerojet	29 m	150			No	8	(United States) VAFB	1963	1965
Thor-ISS	United States	Douglas/Thiokol	23 m			500 to MEO	No	5	(United States) VAFB	1976	1980
Thor-SLV2A Agena-B	United States	Douglas/Lockheed	31 m	400			No	2	(United States) VAFB	1963	1966
Thor-SLV2A Agena-D	United States	Douglas/Lockheed	29.3 m	1,500			No	60	(United States) VAFB	1963	1968
Titan II GLV	United States	Martin Marietta	33 m	3,600			No	11 (+1)	(United States) CCSFS	1964	1966
Titan II(23)G	United States	Martin Marietta	31.4 m	3,600			No	13	(United States) VAFB	1988	2003
Titan IIIA	United States	Martin Marietta	38.5 m	3,500			No	4	(United States) CCSFS	1964	1965
Titan IIIB	United States	Martin Marietta	42 m	3,300			No	22	(United States) VAFB	1966	1969
Titan III(23)B	United States	Martin Marietta	42 m	3,350			No	9	(United States) VAFB	1969	1971
Titan III(33)B	United States	Martin Marietta	42 m	N/A	4,500		No	3	(United States) VAFB	1971	1973
Titan III(24)B	United States	Martin Marietta	44 m	4,500			No	23	(United States) VAFB	1971	1984
Titan III(34)B	United States	Martin Marietta	45.3 m	N/A			No	11	(United States) VAFB	1975	1987
Titan IIIC	United States	Martin Marietta	41 m	11,500	3,000		No	14	(United States) CCSFS	1965	1970
Titan III(23)C	United States	Martin Marietta	42.5 m	13,100	3,000		No	22	(United States) CCSFS	1970	1982
Titan IIID	United States	Martin Marietta	36 m	12,300			No	22	(United States) VAFB	1971	1982
Titan IIIE	United States	Martin Marietta	48.8 m	15,400			No	7	(United States) CCSFS	1974	1977
Titan 34D	United States	Martin Marietta	44.5 m	14,350	3,600		No	15	(United States) VAFB, (United States) CCSFS	1982	1989
Titan IVA	United States	Martin Marietta	51.36 m(standard)	17,110	4,944 with IUS	14,090 to SSO 4,536 to GSO with Centaur 3,550 to escape with IUS	No	22	(United States) VAFB, (United States) CCSFS	1989	1998
Titan IVB	United States	Lockheed Martin	51.36 m(standard)	21,682	5,761 (9,000 with upper stage)		No	17	(United States) VAFB, (United States) CCSFS	1997	2005
Tysklon-2 (R-36-O)	Soviet Union	Yuzhmash	32 m	3,350			No	18	(Soviet Union) Baikonur	1965	1971
Tsyklon-2A	Soviet Union	Yuzhmash	39.7 m	3,350			No	8	(Soviet Union) Baikonur	1967	1969
Tsyklon-2M	Soviet Union Ukraine	Yuzhmash	39.7 m	2,820			No	106	(Kazakhstan) Baikonur	1969	2006
Tsyklon-3	Soviet Union Ukraine	Yuzhmash	39.3 m	1,920			No	122	(Russia) Plesetsk	1977	2009
Unha-2	North Korea	KCST	29.5 m	80			No	1	(North Korea) Tonghae	2009	2009
Unha-3	North Korea	KCST	30 m	110			No	4	(North Korea) Sohae	2009 (Note: A suborbital test flight failed in 2006. The first two orbital missions failed in 2009 and 2012, and the rocket finally reached orbit in late 2012.)	2016
Vanguard	United States	Martin	22.1 m	9			No	10 (+1)	(United States) CCSFS	1957	1959
Vanguard SLV-7	United States	Martin	21.6 m	20			No	1	(United States) CCSFS	1959	1959
VLS-1	Brazil	AEB, IAE	19.5 m	380			No	2 (Note: A third rocket exploded before launch.)	(Brazil) CEA	1997	2003
Vega	Europe Italy	ArianeGroupAvio	31 m	2,300	N/A	1,450 to SSO 1,500 to polar	Expendable	22	(France) CSG	2012	2024
Volna-O	Russia	Makeyev	14.2 m	100			No	1 (+5)	(Russia) Borisoglebsk	1995 (Note: First orbital launch attempt in 2005)	2005
Voskhod	Soviet Union	RSC Energia	44.1 m	5,680			No	299	(Soviet Union) Baikonur, (Soviet Union) Plesetsk	1963	1976
Vostok-L (Luna)	Soviet Union	RSC Energia	30.8 m	4,000		400 to TLI	No	9	(Soviet Union) Baikonur	1958	1960
Vostok (Korabl)	Soviet Union	RSC Energia	38.4 m	4,550		390 to TLI	No	4	(Soviet Union) Baikonur	1960	1960
Vostok-K	Soviet Union	RSC Energia	30.8 m	2,460			No	16	(Soviet Union) Baikonur	1960	1964
Vostok-2	Soviet Union	RSC Energia	30.8 m	4,730			No	45	(Soviet Union) Baikonur, (Soviet Union) Plesetsk	1962	1967
Vostok-2M	Soviet Union	RSC Energia	38.8 m	1,300			No	93	(Soviet Union) Baikonur, (Soviet Union) Plesetsk	1964	1991
Soyuz/Vostok	Soviet Union	RSC Energia	31 m	6,000			No	2	(Soviet Union) Baikonur	1965	1966
Zenit-2	Soviet Union Ukraine	Yuzhnoye	57 m	13,740			No	36	(Kazakhstan) Baikonur	1985	2004
Zenit-2FG	Ukraine	Yuzhnoye	57 m				No	1	(Kazakhstan) Baikonur	2011	2011
Zenit-2M	Ukraine	Yuzhnoye	57 m	13,920			No	1	(Kazakhstan) Baikonur	2007	2007
Zenit-3F	Ukraine	Yuzhnoye	59.6 m			1,740 to GEO	No	4	(Kazakhstan) Baikonur	2011	2017
Zenit-3SL	Ukraine	Yuzhmash RSC Energia	59.6 m	7,000	6,160		No	36	(Norway) Ocean Odyssey	1999	2014
Zenit-3SLB	Ukraine	Yuzhmash RSC Energia	59.5 m		3,750		No	6	(Kazakhstan) Baikonur	2008	2013
Zhuque-1	China	LandSpace	19 m	300		200 to SSO	No	1	(China) JSLC	2018	2018

== See also ==
- Launch vehicle
- Orbital spaceflight
- Space exploration
