= EROS A =

Israeli commercial Earth observation satellite

- Names: Earth Remote Observation System-A; EROS-A1
- Mission type: Earth observation
- Operator: ImageSat International
- COSPAR ID: 2000-079A
- SATCAT no.: 26631
- Website: https://www.imagesatintl.com/
- Mission duration: 10 years (planned); 16.5 years (achieved)

Spacecraft properties
- Spacecraft: EROS-A1
- Spacecraft type: Ofeq-3
- Bus: OPSAT-2000
- Manufacturer: Israel Aerospace Industries
- Launch mass: 260 kg (570 lb)
- Dimensions: 2.3 m in height 1.2 m in diameter
- Power: 450 watts

Start of mission
- Launch date: 5 December 2000, 12:32 UTC
- Rocket: Start-1
- Launch site: Svobodny Cosmodrome, Launch Complex-5
- Contractor: Moscow Institute of Thermal Technology

End of mission
- Last contact: May 2016
- Decay date: 7 July 2016

Orbital parameters
- Reference system: Geocentric orbit
- Regime: Low Earth orbit
- Perigee altitude: 490 km (300 mi)
- Apogee altitude: 565 km (351 mi)
- Inclination: 97.30°
- Period: 94.60 minutes

The Earth Remote Observation System-A (EROS-A or EROS-A1) was part of the EROS family of Israeli commercial Earth observation satellites, designed and manufactured by Israel Aircraft Industries (IAI). This was the first satellite in the series. The satellite was owned and operated by ImageSat International, ImageSat International N.V. (ISI) headquartered at Limassol, Cyprus, and incorporated in the Netherlands Antilles, Cayman Islands.

== Launch ==
The EROS A was launched on 5 December 2000, at 12:32 UTC, from Svobodny Cosmodrome, Launch Complex-5 in eastern Siberia.

== Satellite description ==
The satellite was 1.2 m in diameter, 2.3 m in height. It weighed 260 kg at launch. The design was based on the military reconnaissance satellite Ofeq-3, which was previously built, also by Israel Aerospace Industries (IAI) for Israeli government use.

=== Control systems ===
The satellite was equipped with a three-axis stabilized and a four reaction wheels actuator. The satellite is also equipped with horizon sensors, Sun sensors, gyroscopes and magnetometer for altitude determination.

=== Ground communication systems ===
The satellite is equipped with a 70 Mbit/s imagery link, a 15 kbit/s maintenance downlink, and a 15 kbit/s command uplink.

== Mission ==
The satellite always crosses the equator at 10:00 am local time. Future satellites were planned to extend the time dimension to vary the crossing time between mid-morning and mid after. This will allow it to compensate for poor visibility conditions arising from clouds at different altitudes. While the satellite's primary purpose is agricultural engineers, planners and other professionals who need detailed pictures of different places in the world, it can also be used for various other applications. The satellite provides commercial images with an optical resolution of 1.8 metres using. It has optical resolution capabilities of up to 1.2 meters. The satellite can be temporarily controlled by a customer when it passes over the areas of interest. This is used to allow the client privacy without the operator knowing what's being looked at. This capability, however, is not allowed over the State of Israel by the Israeli government.

Following its launch, the first customer announced was the Ministry of Defense of Israel, which paid about $15 million for the exclusive rights to receive all images of Israel's territory and an area within a radius of about 2,000 km. The need for the satellite's capabilities was due to the failure of the launch of the Ofek-4 satellite, two years earlier and the decay of Ofek-3. Other customers of the satellite were the Taiwan Defense Ministry, India, and media organizations that purchased footage from the battlefield at the start of the Afghan war, footage that competitor "Space Imaging" (Owner of Ikonos) was banned from selling by the US government. Additionally, a database was established with photographs of the satellite that were sold to companies around the world on demand.

The satellite increased its orbital altitude for the last time on 24 April 2012 and reentered on 7 July 2016.

== See also ==
- EROS (satellite)
- EROS-B
- Israel Space Agency
- Science and technology in Israel
