= EROS (satellite) =

Israeli commercial Earth observation satellite series

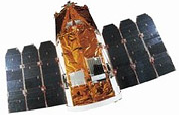
- EROS-B Satellite
- Manufacturer: IAI
- Country of origin: Israel
- Operator: ImageSat International

Production
- Status: Active
- Built: 3 known
- Launched: 3
- Maiden launch: EROS A, December 5, 2000
- Last launch: EROS C3, December 30, 2022

Earth Resources Observation Satellite (EROS) is a series of Israeli commercial Earth observation satellites, designed and manufactured by Israel Aircraft Industries (IAI), with optical payload supplied by El-Op. The satellites are owned and operated by ImageSat International N.V. (ISI), a company founded in 1997, as a Joint venture between IAI, El-Op and Core Software Technology (CST). EROS A was launched on December 5, 2000, and EROS B on April 25, 2006.

As of November 2017, ImageSat International is controlled by Private-equity fund "FIMI". In July 2021, ImageSat announced a partnership with "e-GEOS", a company owned by the Italian Space Agency and Telespazio, to consolidate their assets, including COSMO-SkyMed Satellites, to form one satellite constellation.

== Program history ==
The "Eros" satellite project began in the second half of the 1990s, as an of initiative of IAI, with the aim of commercializing the technology of the Ofek series of reconnaissance satellites for the civilian market. A joint venture was established between IAI and the American company Core Software Technology (CST) in 1997, named "West Indies Space" headquartered at Limassol, Cyprus, and incorporated in the Netherlands Antilles. A year later El-Op, the camera maker of Ofek satellites, become a partner and held 12% of the joint venture. The venture competed in the international markets with Lockheed Martin, which at the time was developing the Ikonos satellite, that had similar capabilities.

The first satellite "EROS A" was developed in parallel with "Ofeq-4" and was based on it. "West Indies Space" signed an agreement with the Israeli government as its first customer. In March 1999, "West Indies Space" announced that the satellite would be launched in December 1999, using a Russian launcher. It also announced that about $250 million will be raised to launch the first three satellites, including insurance, and launch costs, purtily financed by issuance of bonds in the United States, and after the launch of the first satellite, the company will have an initial public offering of the shares of the venture.

In July 1999, the venture completed a $93 million capital raising venture in the United States, changing the name of the joint venture from "West Indies Space" to "ImageSat International". With the entry of a group of investors from Europe and the United States into the venture, IAI reduced its share to 31% and El-Op to 9%. The first satellite was finally launched on December 5, 2000. The launch was carried out aboard the Russian launcher "Start 1" at the launch site of the Svobodny Cosmodrome in Siberia. The Russian launcher was chosen because of its low cost, and it was the conversion of a Soviet ballistic missile. "EROS A" crossed the equator at 10:00 in the morning local time, according to the plan the additional satellites in the series would expand the time dimension, i.e. their crossing times over the equator would range from mid-morning to mid-afternoon, enabling the satellite constellation to provide comprehensive view of a location. Six weeks after the launch, ImageSat International announced that the satellite had begun filming from space.

Following the launch of "EROS A", the program planned to market its capabilities to customers around the world, but the first customer announced was the Ministry of Defense of Israel, which paid about $15 million for the exclusive rights to receive all images of Israel's territory and an area within a radius of about 2,000 km. The need for the satellite's capabilities was due to the failure of the launch of the Ofek-4 satellite, two years earlier and the decay of Ofek-3. Other customers of the satellite were the Taiwan Defense Ministry, India, and media organizations that purchased footage from the battlefield at the start of the Afghan war, footage that competitor "Space Imaging" (Owner of Ikonos) was banned from selling by the US government. Additionally, a database was established with photographs of the satellite that were sold to companies around the world on demand.

ImageSat International announced that it had begun construction of the second satellite in the series, a day before the launch of the first satellite "EROS A". According to the plan, the launch of the "EROS B" was to take place in 2001, after which another 6 satellites in the series were planned. In July 2000, the company announced the completion of a capital raising of more than $90 million. A year later, it signed a $70 million credit agreement with Bank Leumi to finance the further development of the satellite series, and announced that the launch of the second satellite had been postponed to 2003. On July 28, 2001, IAI officially signed an agreement with ImageSat International, to build the $110 million EROS B satellite. However the project was delayed due to difficulties in signing enough commercial customers to meet the financial costs. The second satellite in the series was finally launched on April 25, 2006. Due to the failure of Ofek-6 launch, the CEO of ImageSat suggested that the company should take ownership also of the Ofek program.

=== Legal disputes ===
Following the launch of "EROS B", Imgesat planned to have an initial public offering on NASDAQ, at a market value of half a billion dollars, and to raise capital for the further development and launch of "EROS" satellites. However, in July 2007, Israeli and American investors submitted a $6 billion lawsuit against the company, in a Manhattan court alleging that the company refused to provide services to Venezuela because of the hostile relations of the country's ruler, Hugo Chavez, with Israel and its ties with Iran. According to the plaintiffs, the root of the problem was joint ownership of the venture by private investors and IAI (owned by the State of Israel). According to them, the partial ownership that the state has in the company harmed the chance of profitable contracts, due to political considerations. They claimed that IAI preferred political considerations over economic interests. It was further alleged, that additional contracts were not executed for political reasons, including with: Angola, Russia and Taiwan. The lawsuit also claimed that the only bans imposed, at the time of the company's establishment, were that it was not allowed to sell satellites images to any country within a radius of up to 1,550 miles from Israel.

A year later, the lawsuit was dismissed, but Core Software Technology, one of the minority shareholders in Imagesat, filed a new lawsuit against New York in court. This lawsuit was also dismissed and Morris Talansky, one of the investors, filed a third lawsuit. As part of the lawsuit series, Steve Wilson, the founder of Core Software, which was one of the original initiators of venture, claimed that IAI deceived the other investors in the venture and took it over. In January 1998 the satellite that was supposed to be EROS A was launched as Ofeq-4 and failed. The satellite that was finally launched was in its replacement. In addition, he claimed that EROS B was not built according to the specifications provided by Imgesat, it was delivered three years late, and was in fact a duplicate of "Ofeq-5".

Further legal disputes against the company included: a lawsuit by the CEO for bonus payments, allegedly owned to him for signing a deal with Angola. And an attempt to file a lawsuit against the company in Israel.

Additionally, the State Comptroller of Israel also published a critical audit report, in September 2005, about IAI's involvement in the program and losses incurred from it. Among the shortcomings revealed were: that the company's plans for the sale of satellite observation services were partial and unsubstantiated, in terms of the quality of the data and the reasonableness of the assumptions on which they were based on. All this in a market where IAI had no previous experience. And the business plan presented to the board of directors included a key marketing assumption, regarding long-term contracts, which was too optimistic.

=== Acquisition and IPO ===
For about ten years, ImageSat International operated with the first two satellites it launched, in a limited way, and not according to the original plan. In November 2017, Private-equity fund "FIMI" paid $40m for 53.6% of ImageSat. At the time it was announced that the company will go ahead with its plan to launch EROS C (first announced in 2006), based on IAIs OPTSAT-3000 satellite. Later the company announced launching a new development program, for a satellite series called "EROS-NG" (Next Generation). In February 2022, the company had an initial public offering (IPO) on the Tel Aviv Stock Exchange.

== Satellites ==
=== EROS A ===
EROS A was launched on the Russian Start-1 launcher on December 5, 2000, from the Svobodny Launch Complex in eastern Siberia, to a Low Earth orbit (LEO) altitude of 480 km. The satellite provides commercial images with an optical resolution of 1.8 meters. The satellite orbits Earth in a Sun synchronous orbit, so that its imaged target is always in daylight. It always crosses the equator at 9:45 am local time.

Its dimensions: height: 2.3 m, diameter: 1.2 m, head: 0.7 m. It weighed 250 kg at launch. It was built based on the military reconnaissance satellite Ofeq 3, which was previously built, also by IAI and El-Op, for Israeli government use.

The EROS-A satellite reentered on July 7, 2016.

=== EROS B ===
ImageSat initially planned to launch EROS B a year after EROS A, but the program was delayed, due to commercial difficulties. EROS B was finally launched on April 25, 2006, aboard a Russian Start-1 rocket from the Svobodny Launch Complex in eastern Siberia. The satellite offers an optical resolution of 70 cm (about two feet), and as of launch date plans were to use it to monitor Iran's developing nuclear program for potential threats to Israeli security.

Originally, a constellation of 4 EROS-B satellites was planned, but the number of satellites was in the end reduced to just one.

=== EROS C ===
In January 2006 ImageSat announced that EROS C will be launched in 2009.

The launch of EROS C, originally planned for 2009, was postponed several times to 2019 and later cancelled, in favour of developing the EROS NG program.

=== EROS NG ===
A satellite constellation comprising a series of 4 very high resolution electro-optical satellites (EROS C1 to C4), two very high resolution synthetic key radar (SAR) satellites ("1 EROSAR" and "2 EROSAR"). The satellites constellation is being developed in collaboration with e-GEOS, a company owned by the Italian Space Agency and Telespazio.

As of early 2022, according to ImageSat reports, the constellation includes the following satellites:

- EROS C1 – An electro-optical satellite with a very high resolution, active in the service of the company but not owned by it.
- EROS C2 – An electro-optical satellite with a very high resolution, active in the service of the company but not owned by it.
- EROS C3 – An electro-optical satellite with a very high resolution owned by the company, under construction by IAI and based on the OPTSAT-3000 satellite, launched in late December 2022 using SpaceX Falcon 9 Block 5.
- EROS C4 – An electro-optical satellite with a very high resolution, planned to be launched in 2026 in partnership with another company.
- EROSAR 1 – A very very high resolution SAR radar satellite, owned by a third party, scheduled for launch during 2022.
- EROSAR 2 – A very very high resolution SAR radar satellite, owned by a third party, scheduled for launch during 2026.

== See also ==
- EROS A
- EROS B
- Israel Space Agency
- Science and technology in Israel
