= EROS B =

Israeli commercial Earth observation satellite

EROS-B
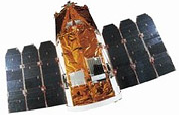
- EROS-B satellite in deployed configuration
- Names: Earth Resources Observation Systems-B
- Mission type: Earth observation
- Operator: ImageSat International
- COSPAR ID: 2006-014A
- SATCAT no.: 29079
- Website: https://www.imagesatintl.com/
- Mission duration: 10 years (planned); 20 years, 1 month and 6 days (in progress)

Spacecraft properties
- Spacecraft: EROS-B
- Spacecraft type: EROS-A
- Bus: OPSAT-2000
- Manufacturer: Israel Aerospace Industries
- Launch mass: 350 kg (770 lb)
- Dimensions: 2.3 m in height 1.2 m in diameter Span: 4 m on orbit
- Power: 800 watts

Start of mission
- Launch date: 25 April 2006, 16:47:16 UTC
- Rocket: Start-1
- Launch site: Svobodny Cosmodrome, Launch Complex-5
- Contractor: Moscow Institute of Thermal Technology

End of mission
- Decay date: 5 February 2026

Orbital parameters
- Reference system: Geocentric orbit
- Regime: Sun-synchronous orbit
- Perigee altitude: 506 km (314 mi)
- Apogee altitude: 524 km (326 mi)
- Inclination: 97.45°
- Period: 94.79 minutes

The Earth Remote Observation System-B (EROS-B) is the second satellite launched in a series of the EROS family of Israeli commercial Earth observation satellites, designed and manufactured by Israel Aircraft Industries (IAI). It is owned and operated by ImageSat International N.V. (ISI), in the Netherlands Antilles, Cayman Islands, with offices in Limassol, Cyprus, and in Tel Aviv, Israel.

ImageSat International announced that it had begun construction of "EROS B", a day before the launch of "EROS A". According to the plan, the launch of the "EROS B" was to take place in 2001, after which another 6 satellites in the series were planned. In July 2000, the company announced the completion of a capital raising of more than $90 million. A year later, it signed a $70 million credit agreement with Bank Leumi to finance the further development of the satellite series, and announced that the launch of the second satellite had been postponed to 2003. On July 28, 2001, IAI officially signed an agreement with ImageSat International to build the $110 million EROS B satellite. However the project was delayed due to difficulties in signing enough commercial customers to meet the financial costs.

== Satellite description ==
The satellite is 2.3 m in height and 1.2 m in diameter. It weighed 350 kg at launch. The design of the satellite is based on the military reconnaissance satellite Ofeq-3, which was previously built, also by Israel Aerospace Industries for Israeli government use. ImageSat International estimates the satellite will work 14 years.

=== Control systems ===
The satellite is equipped with a 3-axis stabilized and a four reaction wheels actuator. The satellite is also equipped with a star tracker, horizon sensor, Sun sensor, gyroscope and magnetometer for altitude determination.

=== Ground communication systems ===
The satellite is equipped with an imagery link four times faster than the EROS-A at 280 Mbit/s, a 15 kbit/s maintenance downlink, and a 15 kbit/s command uplink.

== Launch ==
The EROS-B was launched on 25 April 2006, at 16:47:16 UTC from Svobodny Cosmodrome, Launch Complex-5 in eastern Siberia.

3 days after the launch, ImageSat International announced that the satellite had begun sending images from space.

== Mission ==
The satellite offers an optical resolution of 70 cm (28 in), and as of launch date plans were to use it to monitor the developing of the nuclear program of Iran for potential threats to Israeli security. The satellite is equipped with a charge-coupled device (CDD) push broom scanner array, which provides 10,000 pixels per line and a total of 96 lines for selectable Time-Delay Integration (TDI) observation support. The satellite can be operated in both asynchronous and synchronous imaging mode. It has a Ground sample distance (GSD) of 0.70 m panchromatic imagery. Unlike the EROS A whose primary purpose is to support agricultural engineers, the EROS-B is more specifically designed for illegal construction supervision, general infrastructure monitoring, and emergency monitoring such as oil and gas exploration. EROS-B is the first commercial satellite to offer high spatial resolution images of night-time lights from space.

On 27 June 2016, the safety was the topmost concern for the 2016 Olympic and Paralympic Games, Rio 2016, ensuring that the people from every nation will be kept safe was a daunting task. To assist with this matter the Israeli satellite, EROS-B captured high-resolution images of up to 50 cm in an area of 450 km, thus enabling the identification of objects, people, cars, and goods. The announcement was made by Brazilian Defense Minister Raul Jungmann.

== See also ==
- EROS (satellite)
- EROS-A
- Israel Space Agency
- Science and technology in Israel
