= Launch vehicle =

Rocket used to carry a spacecraft into space

A launch vehicle is typically a rocket-powered vehicle designed to carry a payload (a crewed spacecraft or satellites) from Earth's surface or lower atmosphere to outer space. The most common form is the ballistic missile-shaped multistage rocket, but the term is more general and also encompasses vehicles like the Space Shuttle. Most launch vehicles operate from a launch pad, supported by a launch control center and systems such as vehicle assembly and fueling. Launch vehicles are engineered with advanced aerodynamics and technologies, which contribute to high operating costs.

An orbital launch vehicle must lift its payload at least to the boundary of space, approximately 150 km (93 mi) and accelerate it to a horizontal velocity of at least 7,814 m/s (17,480 mph). Suborbital vehicles launch their payloads to lower velocity or are launched at elevation angles greater than horizontal.

Practical orbital launch vehicles use chemical propellants such as solid fuel, liquid hydrogen, kerosene, liquid oxygen, or hypergolic propellants.

Launch vehicles are classified by their orbital payload capacity, ranging from small-, medium-, heavy- to super-heavy lift.

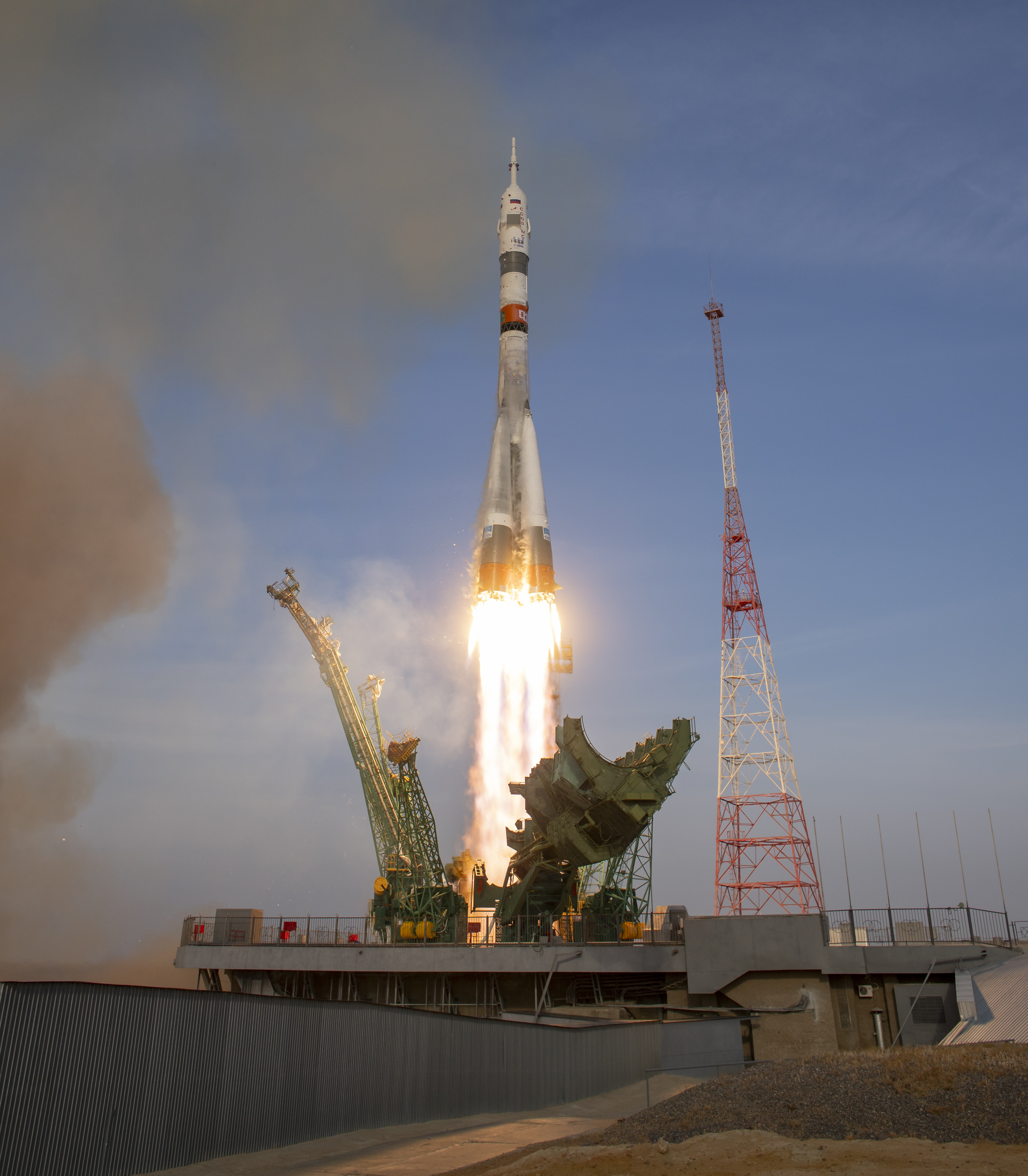
Russian Soyuz MS-28 lifts off from the Baikonur Cosmodrome in Kazakhstan heading for the International Space Station.

== History ==
Following the end of the Space Race, spaceflight has been characterized by greater international cooperation, cheaper access to low Earth orbit and an expansion of commercial ventures. Interplanetary probes have visited all of the planets in the Solar System, and humans have remained in orbit for long periods aboard space stations such as Mir and the International Space Station (ISS). Most recently, China has emerged as the third nation with the capability to launch independent crewed missions, while operators in the commercial sector have developed reusable booster systems and craft launched from airborne platforms. In 2020, SpaceX became the first commercial operator to successfully launch a crewed mission to the ISS with Crew Dragon Demo-2.

== Mass to orbit ==
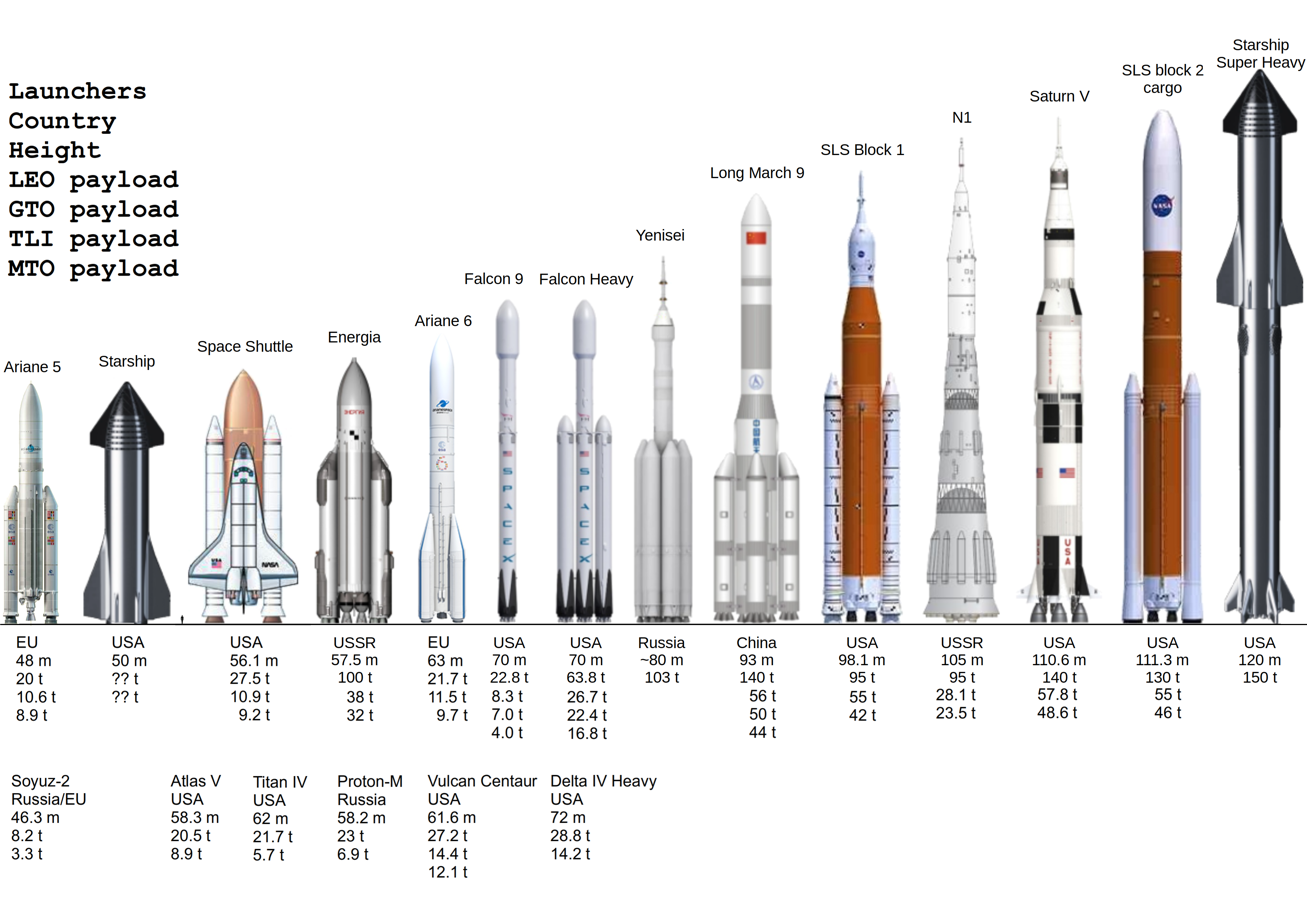
Comparison of launch vehicles. Show payload masses to LEO, GTO, TLI and MTO.

Launch vehicles are classed by NASA according to low Earth orbit payload capability:

- Small-lift launch vehicle: < 2,000 kilograms (4,400 lb) – e.g. Vega
- Medium-lift launch vehicle: 2,000 to 20,000 kilograms (4,400 to 44,100 lb) – e.g. Soyuz ST
- Heavy-lift launch vehicle: 20,000 to 50,000 kilograms (44,000 to 110,000 lb) – e.g. Ariane 5
- Super-heavy lift vehicle: > 50,000 kilograms (110,000 lb) – e.g. Saturn V

Sounding rockets are similar to small-lift launch vehicles, however they are usually even smaller and do not place payloads into orbit. A modified SS-520 sounding rocket was used to place a 4-kilogram payload (TRICOM-1R) into orbit in 2018.

== General information ==
The Challenges of Outer Space (1955) presented by Wernher von Braun.

Orbital spaceflight requires a satellite or spacecraft payload to be accelerated to high velocity. In the vacuum of space, reaction forces must be provided by the ejection of mass, resulting in the rocket equation. The physics of spaceflight are such that rocket stages are typically required to achieve the desired orbit.

Expendable launch vehicles are designed for one-time use, with boosters that usually separate from their payload and disintegrate during atmospheric reentry or on contact with the ground. In contrast, reusable launch vehicles are designed to be recovered intact and launched again. The SpaceX Falcon 9 is an example of a reusable launch vehicle. As of 2023, all reusable launch vehicles that were ever operational have been partially reusable, meaning some components are recovered and others are not. This usually means the recovery of specific stages, usually just the first stage, but sometimes specific components of a rocket stage may be recovered while others are not. The Space Shuttle, for example, recovered and reused its solid rocket boosters, the Space Shuttle orbiter that also acted as a second stage, and the engines used by the core stage (the RS-25, which was located at the back of the orbiter), however the fuel tank that the engines sourced fuel from, which was separate from the engines, was not reused.

For example, the European Space Agency is responsible for the Ariane V, and the United Launch Alliance manufactures and launches the Delta IV and Atlas V rockets.

=== Launch platform locations ===
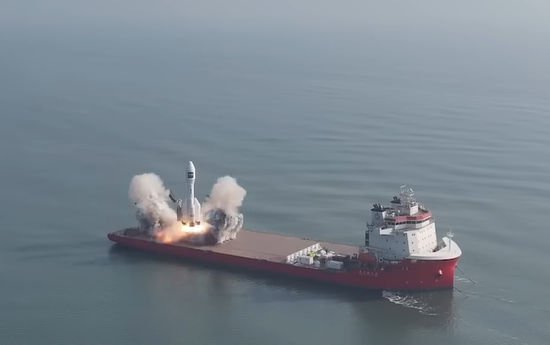
Sea launch by a Chinese company Orienspace

Launchpads can be located on land (spaceport), on a fixed ocean platform (San Marco), on a mobile ocean platform (Sea Launch), and on a submarine. Launch vehicles can also be launched from the air.

=== Flight regimes ===
A launch vehicle will start off with its payload at some location on the surface of the Earth. To reach orbit, the vehicle must travel vertically to leave the atmosphere and horizontally to prevent re-contacting the ground. The required velocity varies depending on the orbit but will always be extreme when compared to velocities encountered in normal life.

Launch vehicles provide varying degrees of performance. For example, a satellite bound for Geostationary orbit can either be directly inserted by the upper stage of the launch vehicle or launched to a geostationary transfer orbit (GTO). A direct insertion places greater demands on the launch vehicle, while GTO is more demanding of the spacecraft. Once in orbit, launch vehicle upper stages and satellites can have overlapping capabilities, although upper stages tend to have orbital lifetimes measured in hours or days while spacecraft can last decades.

=== Distributed launch ===
Distributed launch involves the accomplishment of a goal with multiple spacecraft launches. A large spacecraft such as the International Space Station can be constructed by assembling modules in orbit, or in-space propellant transfer conducted to greatly increase the delta-V capabilities of a cislunar or deep space vehicle. Distributed launch enables space missions that are not possible with single launch architectures.

Mission architectures for distributed launch were explored in the 2000s and launch vehicles with integrated distributed launch capability built-in began development in 2017 with the SpaceX Starship design. The standard Starship launch architecture is to refuel the spacecraft in low Earth orbit to enable the craft to send high-mass payloads on more energetic missions.

== Return to launch site ==
After 1980, but before the 2010s, two orbital launch vehicles developed the capability to return to the launch site. Both the US Space Shuttle—with one of its abort modes—and the Soviet Buran had a designed-in capability to return a part of the launch vehicle to the launch site via the mechanism of horizontal-landing of the spaceplane portion of the launch vehicle. In both cases, the main vehicle thrust structure and the large propellant tank were expendable, as had been the standard procedure for all orbital launch vehicles flown prior to that time. Both were subsequently demonstrated on actual orbital nominal flights, although both also had an abort mode during launch that could conceivably allow the crew to land the spaceplane following an off-nominal launch.

In the 2000s, both SpaceX and Blue Origin privately developed a set of technologies to support vertical landing of the booster stage of a launch vehicle. After 2010, SpaceX undertook a development program to acquire the ability to bring back and vertically land a part of the Falcon 9 orbital launch vehicle: the first stage. The first successful landing was done in December 2015. Since 2017, rocket stages routinely land either at a landing pad adjacent to the launch site or on a landing platform at sea, some distance away from the launch site. The Spacex Falcon Heavy is similarly designed to reuse the three cores comprising its first stage. On its first flight in February 2018, the two outer cores returned to the launch site landing pads while the center core targeted the landing platform at sea but did not successfully land on it.

Blue Origin developed similar technologies for bringing back and landing their suborbital New Shepard, successfully demonstrated return in 2015, and successfully reused the same booster on a second suborbital flight in January 2016. By October 2016, Blue Origin had reflown, and landed successfully, that same launch vehicle a total of five times. The launch trajectories of both vehicles are very different, with New Shepard going straight up and down, whereas Falcon 9 cancels substantial horizontal velocity and return from a significant distance downrange.

Both Blue Origin and SpaceX also have additional reusable launch vehicles under development. Blue Origin is developing the first stage of the orbital New Glenn LV to be reusable, with first flight planned for no earlier than 2024. SpaceX has a new super-heavy launch vehicle under development for missions to interplanetary space. The SpaceX Starship is designed to support return to the launch site, vertical-landing and full reuse of both the booster stage and the integrated second-stage/large-spacecraft that are designed for use with Starship. Its first launch attempt took place in April 2023; however, both stages were lost during ascent. The fifth launch attempt ended with Booster 12 being caught (upon its return) by the launch tower, and Ship 30, the upper stage, successfully landing in the Indian Ocean.

== See also ==
- Air launch to orbit
- Comparison of orbital launch systems
- Comparison of retired orbital launch vehicles
- Launch vehicle system tests
- List of canceled launch vehicle designs
- List of human spaceflights
- List of orbital launch systems
- NewSpace
- Nuclear thermal rocket
- Rocket launch
- Reusable launch vehicle
- Space exploration
- Space logistics
- Space vehicle launch preparation
- Timeline of spaceflight
- Transporter erector
