= Production Corporation Polyot =

Russian aerospace engineering company

Coordinates: 54.955°N 73.424°E

- Type: Federal state unitary enterprise
- Industry: Aerospace
- Founded: 1941
- Headquarters: Omsk, Russia
- Number of employees: 4,500 (2008)
- Parent: Khrunichev State Research and Production Space Center
- Website: polyot.su

Production Association Polyot (Russian: Производственное объединение «Полёт», lit. 'flying, flight') is a Russian aerospace engineering state corporation best known for being the manufacturer of GLONASS satellites and the Kosmos-3M space launch vehicle. The company is based in Omsk, in the Russian Federation.

In 2007, the company was integrated into the Khrunichev enterprise. Its full name is "Polyot" Manufacturing Corporation – A Branch of The Federal State Unitary Enterprise "Khrunichev State Research and Production Space Center".

== Overview ==
The Kosmos-3M launch vehicle, produced at the company since 1969, has established a reputation as one of the most reliable rockets in its class with a reliability coefficient of 0.97. Polyot also develops navigation satellites, such as Nadezhda, Parus, GLONASS and GLONASS-M.

In the aviation sector, the company's products include the AN-3T light multi-purpose aircraft, AN-70 transport aircraft and the AN-74 multi-purpose aircraft.

PC Polyot is slated to produce the upcoming URM-1 first stage of the Angara, a part of Khrunichev's new Angara rocket family. The Angara is projected to become Russia's primary unmanned launch vehicle in the future. As of 2009, the company was also planned to eventually take over the production of the Briz-KM upper stage, which was then used on the Rockot launch vehicle. This module will function as the second stage of the Angara 1.2 launch vehicle. In 2009, it was expected that, by 2015, 60 URM stages would be produced at the company annually for Angara-3.2 and Angara 1.2 rockets. In the event, this was not achieved as production-level Angara flights were delayed by over half a decade from the plan to begin flying in 2015.

The company entered a partnership with the German company OHB-System, providing the Kosmos-3M launch vehicle as well as designing and producing satellite platforms for OHB-System's Orbcomm project. Six such satellites were launched on 19 June 2008 with the Kosmos-3M rocket: one Orbcomm CDS weighing 80 kg, and five Orbcomm Quick Launches weighing 115 kg each. On November 9, 2009 Orbcomm filed a report to the United States Securities and Exchange Commission stating that since launch, communications capability for three of the quick-launch satellites and the CDS has been lost. The failed satellites experienced attitude control system anomalies as well as anomalies with its power systems, which resulted in the satellites losing their proper orientation toward the sun and in reduced power generation. The company has filed a $50 million claim with its insurers covering the loss of all six satellites and received $44.5 million in compensation. In 2009, Orbcomm turned to another satellite manufacturer to build 18 satellites for its second-generation constellation.

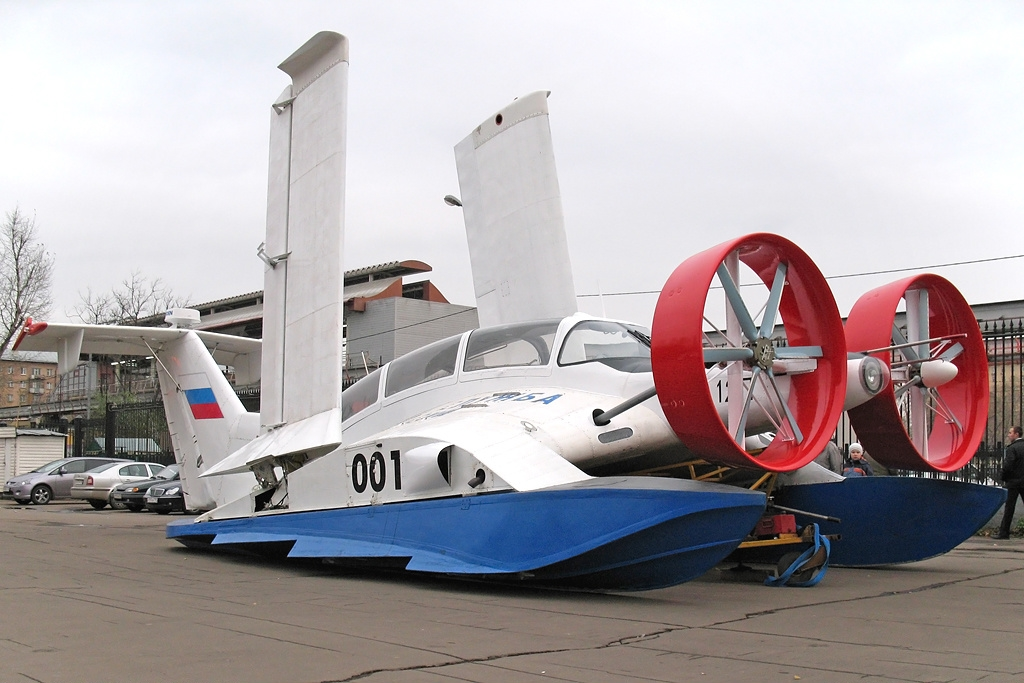
Oriole

Polyot was supposed to begin production of an ekranoplan called Ivolga (Oriole).

== Awards ==
- June 17, 1961 - Order of Lenin
- July 2, 1945 - Order of the Red Banner of Labour
- December 16, 1971 - Order of the October Revolution

== See also ==
- United Rocket and Space Corporation
