= Société d'étude et de réalisation d'engins balistiques =

- Company type: State-owned
- Founded: 17 September 1959; 66 years ago
- Defunct: 31 December 1969
- Fate: Merged into Aérospatiale
- Headquarters: Saint-Médard-en-Jalles, France

Société d'étude et de réalisation d'engins balistiques (SEREB; lit. 'Company for the study and production of ballistic devices') was a French state-owned aerospace company. It was founded on 17 September 1959 with the task of creating missiles capable of carrying French atomic weapons. In 1970 it was merged into Aérospatiale along with other French state-owned aerospace companies.

== History ==
SEREB was created initially to develop two-stage ballistic missiles for nuclear weapons (Force de dissuasion nucléaire française). CNES was formed in 1961, which took over much development of civilian research.

Examples of the work of SEREB can be found at the Musée de l'air et de l'espace (Air and Space Museum) at Paris–Le Bourget Airport.

=== Merger ===
The company merged with Nord Aviation in 1970 to form the much more well-known Aerospatiale (Aerospace), which began as Société nationale industrielle aérospatiale (SNIAS). This merged company became defunct in July 2000, joining EADS (European Aeronautic Defence and Space Company).

== Structure ==
It was headquartered at the Centre d’achèvement et d’essais des propulseurs et engins (CAEPE) at Saint-Médard-en-Jalles, Gironde in the large Nouvelle-Aquitaine department in western France, north of the Arrondissement of Bordeaux. The site was known as the Centre d’achèvement des propulseurs et engins between 1962 and 1964, run by the Direction générale de l'armement (DGA).

Today, the area is a main site for rocket engine development. Groupe SNPE was formed there in 1971. Snecma Propulsion Solide was there from 2005 to 2012 at Le Haillan. SEREB is now Airbus Safran Launchers (previously Astrium Space Transportation).

== Products ==
- Saphir (rocket), two stage rocket

== See also ==
- French space program
- France and weapons of mass destruction
