= Start-1 =

Russian satellite launch vehicle

- Start-1 launch vehicle lifting off from the Svobodny Cosmodrome
- Function: Small orbital launch vehicle
- Manufacturer: Moscow Institute of Thermal Technology
- Country of origin: Russia

Size
- Height: 22.7 m (74 ft)
- Diameter: 1.8 m (5.9 ft)
- Mass: 47,200 kg (104,100 lb)
- Stages: 4

Capacity

Payload to LEO
- Mass: 550 kg (1,210 lb)

Payload to SSO
- Mass: 167 kg (368 lb)

Launch history
- Status: Retired
- Launch sites: LC-5, Svobodny Cosmodrome; LC-158, Plesetsk Cosmodrome
- Total launches: 7
- Success(es): 6
- Failure: 1
- First flight: 25 March 1993
- Last flight: 25 April 2006

First stage – 15Zh58A
- Powered by: 1 MIHT-1
- Maximum thrust: 980 kN (220,000 lb_{f})
- Specific impulse: 263 s (2.58 km/s)
- Burn time: 60 seconds
- Propellant: Solid

Second stage – 15Zh58B
- Powered by: 1 MIHT-2
- Maximum thrust: 490 kN (110,000 lb_{f})
- Specific impulse: 280 s (2.7 km/s)
- Burn time: 64 seconds
- Propellant: Solid

Third stage – 15Zh58V
- Powered by: 1 MIHT-3
- Maximum thrust: 245 kN (55,000 lb_{f})
- Specific impulse: 280 s (2.7 km/s)
- Burn time: 56 seconds
- Propellant: Solid

Fourth stage – Start
- Powered by: 1 MIHT-4
- Maximum thrust: 9.8 kN (2,200 lb_{f})
- Specific impulse: 295 s (2.89 km/s)
- Burn time: 207 seconds
- Propellant: Solid

Start-1 is a Russian satellite launch vehicle based on the RT-2PM Topol, a Soviet intercontinental ballistic missile developed by Moscow Institute of Thermal Technology.

== History ==
The Start-1 launch vehicle derives its name from the Strategic Arms Reduction Treaty (START I) between the United States and the Soviet Union. The START I treaty called for both sides to limit their nuclear arsenals to 6,000 nuclear warheads atop a total of 1,600 ICBMs, SLBMs, and bombers. This led to a lot of surplus ICBMs on both sides, including the Soviet Topol. After the collapse of the Soviet Union, Russia took over responsibility for executing the treaty. The Russian government decided to dispose of some of their ICBMs by using them as launch vehicles, which was an allowed method of disposal under the treaty.

Modification of the ICBMs into launch vehicles was carried out by the Moscow Institute of Thermal Technology (MITT), which also designed the Topol missile. On March 25, 1993 (13:15 UTC), the first Start-1 rocket was launched from Plesetsk Cosmodrome with a non-commercial payload. The first commercial launch was conducted almost four years later on March 4, 1997, from Svobodny Cosmodrome with a Russian payload. Since that time all flights of the Start-1 have been conducted from Svobodny. Currently, the Russian company United Start Launch manages the Start-1 program.

The most notable flight of the Start-1 was conducted on April 25, 2006, with the launch of the Israeli EROS B Earth observation satellite. The launch received more coverage than usual because of the tensions between Israel and Iran at the time. While the Eros B satellite is commercial, its primary customer is the Israeli government, which could use it to spy on Iranian military and nuclear facilities.

After EROS B launch the project ended due to small size of small satellite market and loss of business to other small launchers. Around 2016 thanks to the increase of the small satellite market and approaching end of life of Topol missiles MITT and RVSN management started to float the idea of resuming launches. In late 2018 MITT secured funding for the resumption. MITT plans to start launching again in early 2022.

== Description ==
Diagram of the Start-1 rocket.

The Start-1 launch vehicle is derived from the RT-2PM Topol ICBM. The first three stages of the Topol missile are used as the first three stages of the Start-1 rocket and are essentially unmodified for their new purpose. A fourth stage, specially developed by the Moscow Institute of Thermal Technology, and the payload shroud take the place of the nuclear warhead and are the main differences between the Topol ICBM and the Start-1 rocket. Additionally, a Post-Boost Propulsion System (PBPS) may be added between the fourth stage and the payload to circularize the orbit of the payload if necessary. The PBPS provides propulsion using a solid-propellant nitrogen gas generator. The gas goes through three pairs of nozzles that can swivel to maneuver the payload.

The Start-1 rocket is unique amongst launch vehicles in that its launch platform is mobile, allowing for the Start-1 to potentially launch from anywhere. The Start-1 launches from an unmodified Topol Transporter-Erector-Launcher (TEL). The TEL is a massive fourteen-wheeled vehicle, six of which pivot for steering. The launch vehicle is transported and launched inside a mobile Transport and Launch Carrier (TLC) carried by the TEL. The TLC consists of an air-tight composite cylinder that protects the launch vehicle and payload from variations in temperature and humidity. The TLC lies in the middle of the TEL lengthwise and bisects the driver's cab in two.

A Start-1 TEL moving towards the launch pad

Before launch, the TEL is moved to the launch pad where it deploys four stabilizing jacks which lift the whole vehicle off the ground. Approximately 90 seconds before the launch, the TLC ejects the protective front nose cone, exposing the rocket so that it can launch. The TLC then is raised to a vertical position. During the launch sequence, the TEL uses compressed gas to force the rocket out of the TLC. Once the rocket reaches a height of approximately 30 meters (the height of the top of the TLC in the vertical position), the first stage ignites. The time from first-stage ignition to spacecraft separation is approximately 15 minutes.

== Variants ==
Diagram of the Start rocket.

A version of the Start-1 rocket, simply called Start, was developed in parallel with the Start-1 program. Start differed from Start-1 by using the second stage of the Start-1 twice, giving it a total of five stages. With the extra stage, payload to low Earth orbit was increased to 850 kg. The first (and, so far, only) launch of the Start rocket occurred on 28 March 1995 from LC158 at the Plesetsk Cosmodrome. The Start rocket carried Gurwin, an Israeli amateur radio satellite built by the Israel Institute of Technology; EKA, a Russian dummy test satellite; and UNAMSAT A, an amateur radio satellite built by the Autonomous University of Mexico. The rocket, however, failed not too long after liftoff, dumping debris and its payload into the Sea of Okhotsk. Little information has come forth from the Russian government as to what caused the rocket to fail, or even whether or not the Start program has been canceled.

== Launch history ==
Flight number	Date (UTC)	Launch site	Version	Payload	Orbit	Result
1	March 25, 1993; 13:15	LC-158, Plesetsk	Start-1	EKA-1 mass simulator	LEO	Success
2	March 28, 1995; 10:00	LC-158, Plesetsk	Start	Gurwin; UNAMSAT A EKA-2	LEO (planned)	Failure
3	March 4, 1997; 02:00	LC-5, Svobodny	Start-1.2	Zeya	SSO	Success
4	December 24, 1997; 13:32	LC-5, Svobodny	Start-1	Early Bird 1	SSO	Success
5	December 5, 2000; 12:32	LC-5, Svobodny	Start-1	EROS A	SSO	Success
6	February 20, 2001; 08:48	LC-5, Svobodny	Start-1	Odin	SSO	Success
7	April 25, 2006; 16:47	LC-5, Svobodny	Start-1	EROS B	SSO	Success

== See also ==
- Comparison of orbital launchers families
