= Svobodny Cosmodrome =

Former spaceport in Amur Oblast, Russia

Coordinates: 51°42′N 128°00′E

Svobodny (Russian: Свобо́дный) was a Russian rocket launch site located approximately 50 km north of Svobodny, Amur Oblast. The cosmodrome was originally constructed as a launch site for intercontinental ballistic missiles called Svobodny-18. It was initially selected as a replacement for Baikonur Cosmodrome in the Kazakh Soviet Socialist Republic, which became independent as Kazakhstan after the dissolution of the Soviet Union. However the development of Svobodny was subsequently ended in 2007 in favour of a totally new space port, the Vostochny Cosmodrome.

== History ==
The breakup of the Soviet Union left the primary cosmodrome, to be used by the successor state Russia, at Baikonur in a foreign country, Kazakhstan. An arrangement to rent the facilities for $115 million annually was arranged. Launches were moved to other facilities, like Plesetsk Cosmodrome, but this location is too far north to be useful for many launches. Studies for a far-east location closer to the latitude of Baikonur started, and initially settled on the existing missile base at Svobodny. This was located near the railway station of Ledyanaya, and had been used for several decades by the 27th rocket division of Strategic Rocket Forces. In the summer of 1994 president Yeltsin visited the town of Blagoveshensk and the modification of the launch pads in the site began shortly after. On 1 March 1996, the Russian president issued a decree formally declaring the site as a cosmodrome.

Launches from Svobodny began in 1997, primarily the Start-1 type, converted ICBMs. The facilities could also host rockets of the Rokot (UR-100N based) class. Only five launches have taken place at the underused Svobodny site (for a list of launches see Start-1 article), the best known to be the Israeli EROS B satellite on 25 April 2006 aboard a Start class rocket.

In 2005, after the lease renewal of the Baikonur Cosmodrome, the Russian Space Agency decided it did not require a second space launch complex, and in February 2007 president Vladimir Putin ordered Svobodny closed. In February 2007, a presidential decree formalized the closure of the launch facility in Svobodny. According to the Russian press, in the previous three years, government investments in Svobodny reached 350 million rubles.

== See also ==
- Vostochny Cosmodrome
- Plesetsk Cosmodrome
- Baikonur Cosmodrome
- Kapustin Yar
