= Aby Har Even =

Israeli rocket scientist (1937–2021)

- אבי הר-אבן
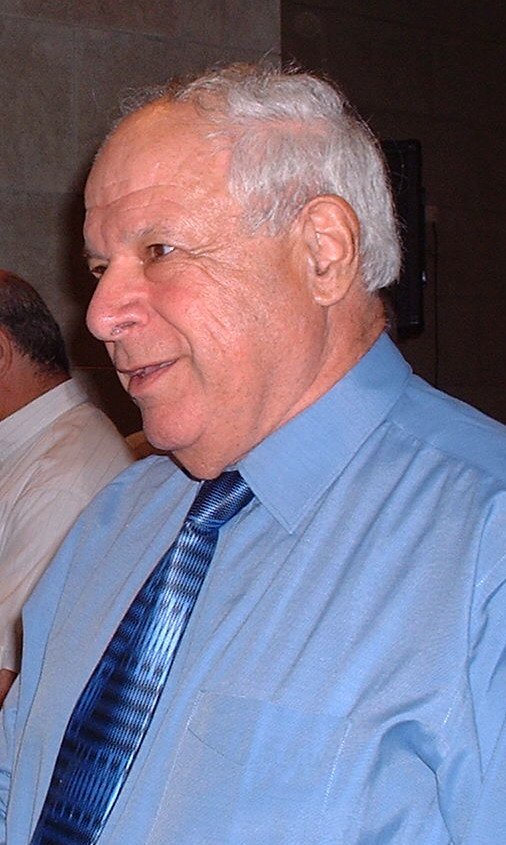
- Aby Har Even, 2003
- Born: March 7, 1937; Rociu, Romania
- Died: June 6, 2021 (aged 84)
- Education: Technion – Israel Institute of Technology
- Organizations: Israeli Aerospace Industries; Israel Defense Forces; Israeli Space Agency
- Awards: Israel Defense Prize

Aby Har Even (Hebrew: אבי הר-אבן; March 7, 1937 – June 6, 2021) was an Israeli military scientist and the fifth Director General of the Israeli Space Agency (1995-2004). Har Even was instrumental to the Israeli space program, served pivotal roles in the Israel Aerospace Industries and was one of the founders of the IDF's missile and advanced weaponry programs. He was recipient of the Israel Defense Prize in 1977.

He died 6 June 2021 at the age of 84 as a result of injuries during an arson attack, during Arab riots in Acre.

== Youth and military service ==
Har Even was born in Romania on 7 March 1937 as Abba Hartstein. His family immigrated to Israel in August 1950. In 1955 he graduated from the Rehavia Gymnasium in Jerusalem. Following his graduation he started to learn Mechanical engineering at the Technion – Israel Institute of Technology as part of the academic reserve program but a few weeks into the program it was stopped and all the participants were drafted into the artillery corps and armored corps.

Har Even served initially in the artillery corps and was sent to officers course, initially intending to pursue a military career. During his army service he attended the Technion – Israel Institute of Technology and graduated as an electrical engineer in 1963. For the following years, Har Even served in the artillery corps in various R&D positions. During his studies the responsibility of anti-aircraft missiles moved to the Air Force.

In 1965, Har Even was sent to Uganda to help establish the country's air defense. Upon his return he founded the Meital unit which encouraged and headed partnerships and research with other countries on security defense systems.

In 1968 he was assigned to the weapons R&D branch which later became MAFAT, and later was promoted to the rank of colonel. In 1977 he was in charge of the team which won the Israel Defense Prize.

During his military service Har Even graduated with an MBA from the Tel Aviv University in 1975.

Har Even retired from military service in 1979.

== In the Israeli Aerospace Industries ==
After the military service, Har Even became the director general of the Israeli subsidiary of Fischer & Porter, which made precise measurement instruments.

In 1982, Har Even joined the Israel Aerospace Industries, where he served in a number of administrative and R&D positions. Initially he was head of the special programs administration and afterwards was asked to head the team that developed Israel's Shavit satellite launcher.

== Director of the Israeli Space Agency ==
From 1995 to December 2004, Har Even served as the fifth Director General of the Israeli Space Agency, where he expanded the ISA's international ties and helped bring about dozens of cooperative ventures between the ISA and other space agencies from around the world.

When Har Even started, The Israeli Space agency was a small organization and Har Even was the first Director General employed full time in the Israeli Space Agency, and for many years he and his secretary were the only official employees. During his time, Har Even succeeded in expending the Israeli Space Agency's scope and national agreements, and formalizing the country's civilian space program.

Among the many accomplishments achieved during his tenure, include:

- International agreements between the Israeli Space Agencies and other space agencies, especially with NASA. The main program with NASA included the first Israeli astronaut Ilan Ramon and the MEIDEX experiment
- Cooperation with Netherlands Agency for Aerospace Programmes for the Sloshsat-FLEVO satellite
- Joint agreement with CNES for space qualification of components at Soreq Nuclear Research Center
- Initialization of the joint venture between Israel and France in the VENμS
- TAUVEX space telescope project
- Reaching an agreement for participation of MATIMOP, the Israel Innovation Authority R&D in the Galileo navigation project

== After the Israeli Space Agency ==
In 2005, Har Even became a research associate at the Begin–Sadat Center for Strategic Studies at the Bar Ilan University, where he published several research papers on Israel's space policy. In 2016, he published "Space Wars", a research into the future of wars in space and the development of Anti-Satellite Weapons (ASATI).

Har Even continued to be a consultant to the Israeli Ministry of economics on space issues.

== 2021 May Riots ==
Har Even was seriously injured during the May riots in Acre. The hotel in which he was staying was burned, and Har Even was hospitalized with severe burns. He died, six weeks later, on June 6, 2021, at the age of 84. According to Tasnim news agency, which is affiliated with the Iranian Revolutionary Guards Corps, the killing of the Israeli nuclear scientist is in response to the killing of Iranian nuclear scientist Mohsen Fakhrizadeh.

== Family ==
Har Even married Miriam in 1959. They have 3 children, one of whom is Yoav Har-Even.
