= Israel Space Agency =

Government space agency of Israel

- סוכנות החלל הישראלית

Agency overview
- Abbreviation: ISA
- Formed: 1983; 43 years ago
- Preceding agency: National Committee for Space Research (1960–1983)
- Type: Space agency
- Headquarters: Tel Aviv, Israel
- Administrator: Shimrit Maman Chairperson; Ran Livne (March 2026) Director General
- Primary spaceport: Palmachim Airbase
- Owner: Israel
- Annual budget: ₪51.063 million US$14.5 million (2019)
- Website: space.gov.il

The Israel Space Agency (ISA; Hebrew: סוכנות החלל הישראלית, Sokhnut heKhalal haYisraelit) is a governmental body, a part of Israel's Ministry of Science and Technology, that coordinates all Israeli space research programs with scientific and commercial goals.

The agency was founded by theoretical physicist Yuval Ne'eman in 1983 to replace the National Committee for Space Research, which had been established in 1960 to set up the initial infrastructure required for space missions. The agency is currently headed by Chairperson Shimrit Maman and Director General Ran Livne. Today, Israel is the smallest country with indigenous launch capabilities, as well as the smallest to have a space agency. Israel was the 8th country to launch a satellite into space.

== History ==
Space research in Israel has history dating to the late 1950s.

=== NCSR and foreign reliance ===
The Israeli Space Agency originated as a university-based research project from Tel Aviv University in the early 1960s. In 1960, the National Committee for Space Research (NCSR) was formed by the Israel Academy of Sciences and Humanities. The committee was formed to increase research activities across the academic communities in Israel. While at the time establishing a space program was not particularly one of its goals, during the 1960s through the late 1970s, the committee developed the infrastructure needed for research and development in space exploration and sciences. One of the NCSR's earliest achievements took place in 1961 with the launch of its first two-stage rocket.

Following political tension with Egypt and Syria, reconnaissance flights became evermore difficult. In 1979, a satellite program was proposed followed by a year of feasibility study. The study was completed by late 1980. Director of Military Intelligence Yehoshua Saguy requested from prime minister Menachem Begin that the project proceed to its next phase. In 1982, a new recommendation called "Ofeq Program" was submitted for developing an observation satellite. The program included timelines, planning for a ground station, budget estimates, and personnel requirements. The primary goal was to develop a satellite program without relying on any foreign know-how, to allow flexibility and creativity. The launcher would be developed by Malam, two engines by Israel Military Industries (IMI), and the third by Rafael.

=== Establishment of a space agency ===
At the end of 1982, during a closed-door meeting, the decision was made to establish an Israeli space agency. The decision was made by PM Menachem Begin, Defence Minister Ariel Sharon, and former director-general of the Defense Ministry, Aharon Beit Halahmi. The initial goal was to pursue the program to develop the Ofeq and the Shavit launchers. In January 1983, the Israeli government authorized the Minister of Science and Technology Yuval Ne'eman to establish an Israeli Space Agency with the goal of advancing Israel's space program, unlike the NCSR, which was primarily used for feasibility and infrastructure studies. In July 1983, the ISA was officially founded in Tel Aviv to coordinate the nation's space program in affiliation with the Ministry of Science, Culture & Sport, and Dror Sadeh was nominated to be its Director-General.

In 1982, the Israel Space Agency was created, which is responsible for coordinating the space program of Israel. The following year, the new head of military intelligence, Ehud Barak, suspended all work, and advocated the winding down of all projects, and planned to transfer the released financial resources to fulfil more priority tasks, he said. However, he did not win his argument in the defense department. In 1984, Defense Minister Moshe Arens insisted on resuming the program.

In 1984, the National Space Knowledge Centre was established in cooperation with Israel Aircraft Industries; a contract was signed between IAI and the Ministry of Defence for the development of the needed infrastructure to successfully launch Israel's first observation satellite. This came to fruition in 1988 when Israel launched the first in a series of Ofeq satellites and thus became one of only a few nations in the world possessing an indigenous space launching capability (see timeline of first orbital launches by country). The project management at Israel Aircraft Industries was headed for many years by Moshe Bar-Lev.

== Vision ==
The agency vision as defined by the guiding committee on July 27, 2005, states:

"Space research and exploration is an essential instrument for the defense of life on Earth; the lever for technological progress; the key to existing in a modern society; essential for developing an economy based on knowledge; and the central attraction for scientific and qualified human resources."

The vision is "to preserve and broaden the comparative advantage of Israel and to place it among the group of leading countries in the space research and exploration area."

The main goals for vision realization are:

- To build and to support satellite systems for space research and for Earth research from space.
- To develop technologies, knowledge and scientific infrastructure (including laboratories and human resources) required for space research.
- To promote international cooperation in space research and exploration, and for strengthening the national interests of Israel.
- To promote ties between Israeli society, space research, and exploration.

ISA has signed cooperation agreements with the space agencies of: United States (NASA), France (CNES), Canada (CSA), India (ISRO), Italy (ASI), Germany (DLR), Ukraine (NSAU), Russia (RKA), Netherlands (NIVR) and Brazil (AEB).

== Budget ==
In 2010, the budget of the Israel Space Agency was increased to US $80 million to boost the agency's space activities in research and development. The budget does not include launch vehicle development and most satellite programs. Typically such programs get funded on a project-by-project basis. For example, Project Venus, a cooperative program by Israel (ISA) and France (CNES) launched in 2017 with a $50 million budget. The Spaceborne Hyperspectral Applicative Land and Ocean Mission (SHALOM), a joint mission by Israel (ISA) and the Italy Space Agency (ASI) has a budget of $116 million.

The budget allocated annually for the Israeli military program as well as commercial programs are managed on different budgets.

== Satellite programs ==
The Israel Space Agency has had a long history of satellite programs both for reconnaissance and commercial purposes. Its first satellite, the Ofeq-1 was launched on September 19, 1988, from Palmachim Airbase in Israel. Since the launching of that first satellite, Israel has developed into a significant player in the commercial space arena. Today, the ISA satellite launches include:

- Ofeq – Series of reconnaissance satellites. The first of these was launched from the Palmachim site on September 19, 1988.
- AMOS – Series of communications satellites
- Eros – Series of observation satellites
- Techsat – Researching satellite launched by the Technion
- TechSAR – a SAR-based observation satellite.

=== Ofeq satellite series ===
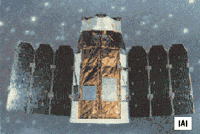
Ofeq-3

After the successful launch of the Ofeq-1 in 1988, additional satellites were developed. In 1989, the ISA launched the Ofeq-2; in April 1995, it took a leap forward with the launch of Ofeq-3, which carried an advanced electro-optical payload built by Israeli industry for local purposes. Ofeq-3 has been functioning without a hitch. Following a setback with Ofeq-4, Ofeq-5 was successfully launched in May 2002.

To date, twelve such satellites in the Ofeq reconnaissance satellites series were developed and launched to Low Earth Orbit. The most recent, Ofek 16, was launched July 6, 2020.

=== AMOS satellite series ===
The AMOS is a series of communications satellites. The AMOS satellites are launched by the Israel Aerospace Industries and are operated by Spacecom once in orbit. The AMOS-1, the first satellite in the series, was launched on May 16, 1996, using a French-built vehicle. Since then, 4 more satellites were launched. The most recent AMOS satellite is the AMOS-5 which was launched on December 11, 2011.

The AMOS is distinguished for its light weight and sophisticated technology. The AMOS-6 was due to be launched in 2016 in order to replace the AMOS-2 which was then ceasing operation, but it was destroyed in a launchpad explosion.

=== EROS satellite series ===
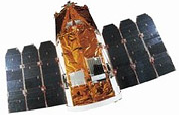
The EROS-B Satellite

The Earth Resources Observation Satellite (EROS) is a series of commercial observation satellites. The first satellite, the EROS A, was launched on December 5, 2000, from Svobodny Launch Complex using a Russian Start-1. A second satellite, the EROS B, was launched on April 25, 2006.

The EROS series were set to be launched once every 6 to 8 years, before the EROS B constellation was reduced from 4 satellites to 1 and EROS C was scrapped in favor of EROS NG. Four of six EROS NG satellites are now in orbit, with the most recent launches (EROS C3 and EROSAR 1) taking place in 2022 and the next scheduled for 2026.

=== TechSAR Satellite ===
The TechSAR satellite is a reconnaissance satellite equipped with a synthetic aperture radar. The satellite is designed penetrate thick clouds by being fitted with a large dish-like antenna to transmit and receive radar signals. The satellite was successfully launched on January 21, 2008.

== Launch capabilities ==
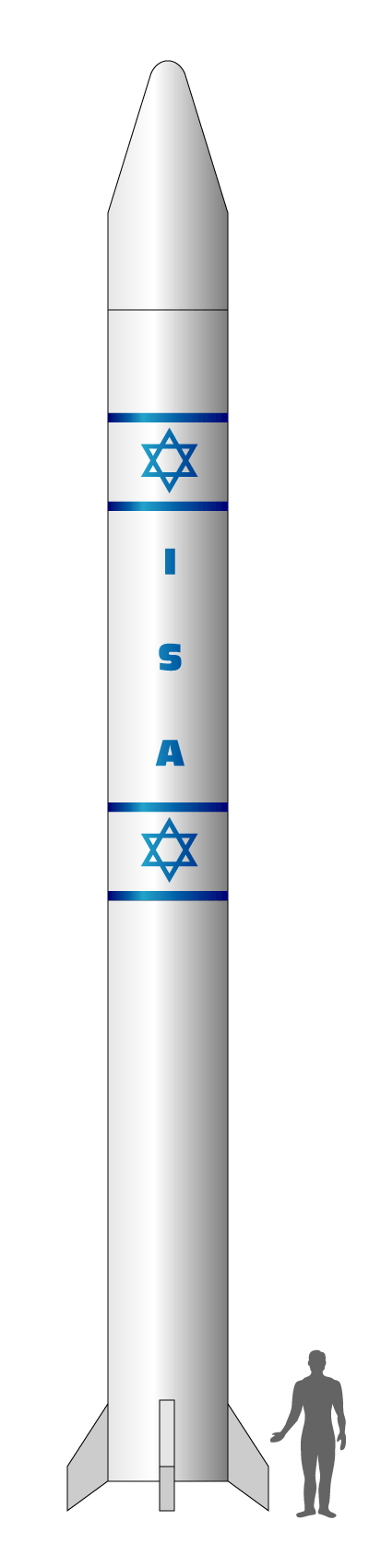
Shavit Rocket

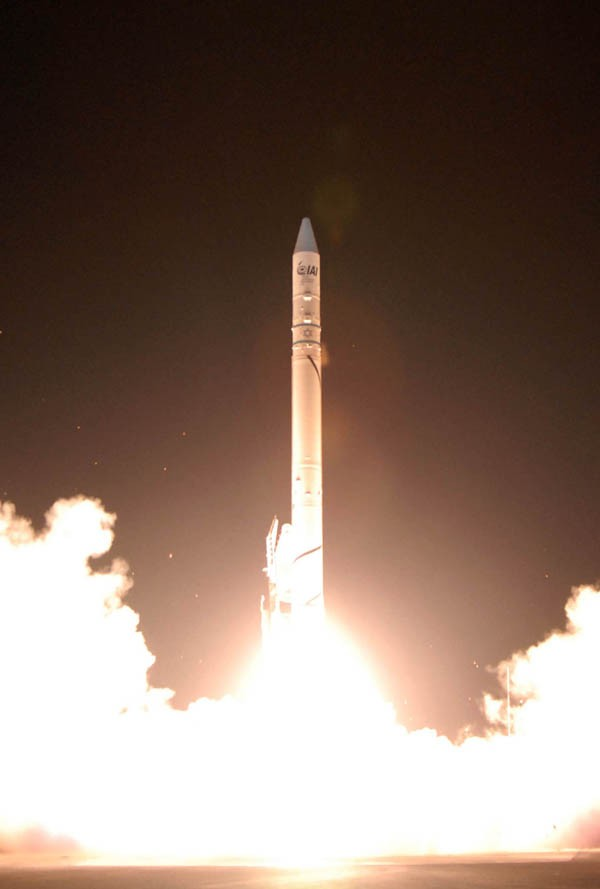
Shavit launcher

The Israel Space Agency in 2025 is one of only a few countries (plus a consortium of European nations) that both build their own satellites and launch their own launchers.The Shavit is a space launch vehicle capable of sending payload into low Earth orbit. The Shavit launcher has been used to send every Ofeq satellite to date.

The development of the Shavit began in 1983 and its operational capabilities were proven on three successful launches of the Ofek satellites on September 19, 1988; April 3, 1990; and April 5, 1995. The Shavit launchers allows low-cost and high-reliability launch of micro/mini satellites to a low Earth orbit. The Shavit launcher is developed by Malam factory, one of four factories in the IAI Electronics Group. The factory is very experienced in development, assembling, testing and operating system for use in space.

The Shavit is a three stage launcher with solid propellant booster based on the 2-stage Jericho-II ballistic missile. The first and second stage engines are manufactured by Ta'as, and use solid fuel. The third stage engines are manufactured by Rafael Advanced Defense Systems. The next generation Shavit rockets, now called the Shavit-2 are being developed. The Shavit-2 is said to be made available for commercial launches in the near future.

=== Palmachim Spaceport ===
The Israel Space Agency and the Israeli Air Force (IAF) jointly operate the spaceport located south of Palmachim Airbase. The IAF and its 151 missile test unit uses it to test its Jericho and Arrow missiles.

Due to Israel's geographic location and hostile relations with surrounding countries, launches take off due west, over the Mediterranean Sea. This is done in order to avoid flying over hostile territories. This is also to prevent possible debris from falling above populated areas. This limitation imposes a penalty of roughly 30% on its lifting capabilities.

Some of the recent ISA launches include:

- June 11, 2007 – Ofeq 7 satellite
- June 22, 2010 – Ofeq 9 satellite
- April 10, 2014 – Ofeq 10 satellite
- September 13, 2016 – Ofeq 11 satellite
- July 6, 2020 – Ofeq 16 satellite

== Space research ==
The ISA is responsible for funding a large set of university research projects and governmental projects. The goal is to boost space related research and development in the academic arena. The Israel Space Agency strives to promote space research and space technology development as a part of the effort to promote the Israeli scientific research.

=== National Knowledge Center on NEOs ===
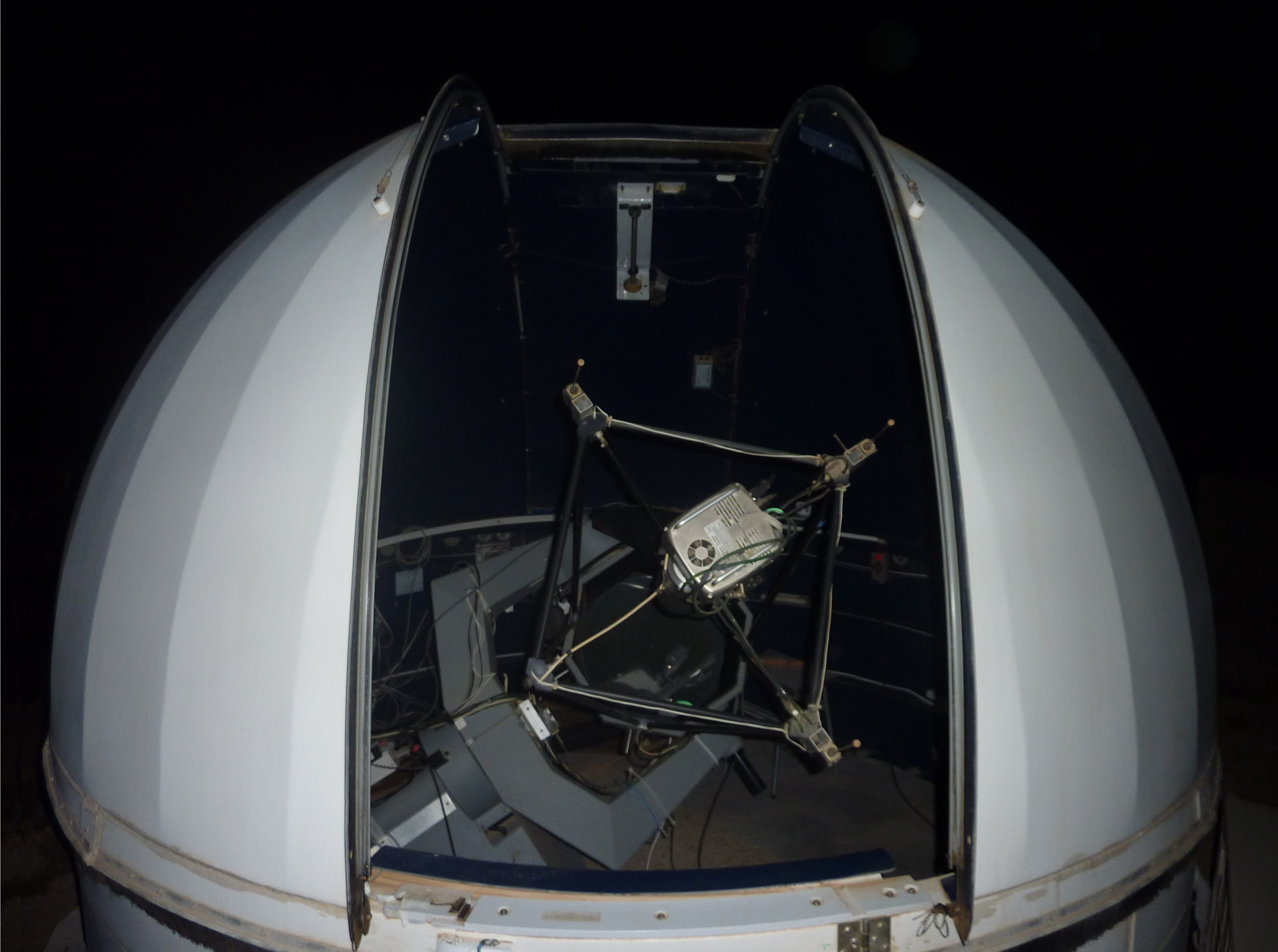
The smaller 46cm Telescope in the Wise Observatory dome.

The ISA and the Ministry of Science and Technology formed and operated the National Knowledge Center on Near Earth Objects at Tel Aviv University in order to study minor bodies in the Solar System. The goal is to map the objects which pose a threat to Earth and to find a solution to eliminate them.

This center is headed by Dr. Noah Brosch from Tel Aviv University and operates the three telescopes of the Wise Observatory. For the purpose of NEO studies, a special wide-field 0.46-m telescope was acquired by Tel Aviv University and is operating at the Wise Observatory located near Mitzpe Ramon. The telescope facilitated the discovery of several tens of new asteroids and is now intensely used to study asteroid rotation and asteroid pair properties. Following the cessation of funding from ISA, the asteroid studies are continuing at the Wise Observatory with no specific financial support.

=== Israel Cosmic Ray Center ===
The Israel Cosmic Ray Center (ICRC) was established in November 1997 with support from the Israel Space Agency and with affiliation to Tel Aviv University and the Technion. The center is located on Mount Hermon and headed by Gideon Bela and Lev Dorman from the Tel Aviv University.

The goal of the center is to monitor and forecast dangerous meteorological and space phenomena. This includes solar radiation storms and shockwaves between very powerful stars creating magnetic storms. These phenomena can endanger electronic systems in satellites and space shuttles, the astronauts' health, electronic and navigational systems in aircraft flying in extremely high altitudes and ground power systems.

The Emilio Segre' Observatory (ESOI) is a cosmic radiation observatory prepared via a joint collaboration with Italy. It was transported to Mount Hermon, Israel in June 1998. The observatory was named after the Italian physicist and Nobel laureate Emilio G. Segrè.

=== EOSDIS ISA-MEIDA ===
The Israel Space Agency - Middle East Interactive Data Archive (ISA-MEIDA) is an Israeli node for NASA's EOSDIS (Earth Observing System Data and Information System). The Node was established in October 1996 as a part of the cooperation agreement between the director of NASA and the director of ISA. It is the only team in the country which focuses on collecting and preserving environmental information in Israel. The ISA-MEIDA was established in order to create and maintain an Earth observing data center available through the Internet to the research community and to the general public free of charge.

This research, headed by Pinhas Alpert, is funded by the ISA as a part of the Space Scientific and Technological Infrastructure Development program. The node is integrated with NASA's Global Information System which includes Earth Observing Science Data and Information System. It also contains Remote Sensing Data from NASA and NOAA satellites, and data from other sources such as meteorological RADAR and readings from meteorological stations. Information collected by the system is critical for environmental and water related research, especially in light of the drastic global environmental changes and global warming.

=== Tel Aviv University Ultraviolet Explorer ===
The Tel Aviv University Ultraviolet Explorer (TAUVEX) is a space telescope array conceived by Noah Brosch of Tel Aviv University. It was eventually designed and constructed for the university by El-Op. TAUVEX is a cluster of three bore-sighted 20-cm telescopes for observation in the ultra-violet funded by the Israel Space Agency. It was due to be launched by India on board the ISRO satellite GSAT-4 satellite but due to a mis-match between the capabilities of the launched and the mass of the satellite, ISRO decided unilaterally to remove TAUVEX from GSAT-4. The telescope ended up in a limbo of constant delays. In 2012 ISA decided to terminate the TAUVEX project.

=== TechSat-Gurwin Microsatellite ===
The Gurwin TechSat was one of the world's first Microsatellites to be designed, built and launched by students. The satellite, developed by the Technion, was launched on July 10, 1998. The satellite was a great success, operating for over 11 years - setting a world record for the longest university satellite mission. The mission was completed in April 2010.

=== Sloshsat-FLEVO ===
The Sloshsat-FLEVO was a satellite launched for the study of liquid sloshing phenomena in space. The satellite was developed in collaboration between the Dutch NLR labs, Fokker Space, and Rafael. The satellite is helped by the Israel Space Agency and the European Space Agency (ESA). The Israel Space Agency initiated the project and partly funded it by supplying the sub-propulsion system.

The propulsion system, funded by the ISA, is fueled by cold gas and is constructed of four high-pressure canisters with pyrotechnic activation. The system can produce both linear acceleration and torque needed to perform slosh research. It is specifically designed to overcome the severe volume constraints encountered in typical satellites.

== Ongoing development ==
The Israel Space Agency is currently involved with multiple satellites, space telescopes, and microsatellites.

=== VENμS ===
The Vegetation and Environment monitoring on a New Micro-Satellite (VENμS) is a satellite to be used for Earth observation using a superspectral sensor, dedicated to vegetation monitoring. It is the first cooperation between Israel (ISA) and France (CNES). VENμS scientific objective is "the provision of data for scientific studies dealing with the monitoring, analysis, and modeling of land surface functioning under the influences of environmental factors as well as human activities."

The Israel Space Agency is responsible for the spacecraft, the launcher interface, and for the satellite control center. The Centre national d'études spatiales is responsible for supplying the superspectral camera and the science mission center. The satellite was launched in August 2017.

At World Space Week in Dubai, in October 2021, Israel and the UAE ministers of science and technology announced plans for cooperation on the mission. They plan to examine phenomena related to Earth resources, precision agriculture, desertification, and monitoring of bodies of water, and climate change– issues common both to Israel and the Emirates.

=== OPsat ===
OPsat is a next generation high resolution optical observation satellite for reconnaissance purposes. It is designed to be a 300 kilograms (660 lb) satellite capable of detecting objects of about 50 centimeters in diameter. It will be equipped with a camera with CCD/TDI sensors, producing both panchromatic imagery at a very high resolution and multispectral imagery at a medium resolution. The satellite is set to orbit in a Sun-synchronous orbit. It is expected to have a lifespan of roughly 10 years.

=== ULTRASAT ===
The ULTRASAT satellite is a wide field (~1000 deg^{2}) transient explorer space telescope mission. ULTRASAT is planned to have eight telescopes equipped with CCD cameras and reflective filters. It is set to have a sensitivity 10 times lower than GALEX but a field of view more than 1000 times larger. It is also planned to have a detection rate for transient in the UV of more than 30 times greater than that of GALEX. The ULTRASAT is planned to be developed in just 3–4 years and relatively low cost. ULTRASAT will observe a large patch of sky, more than 200 square degrees, alternating every six months between the southern and northern hemisphere. The satellite will orbit the Earth from an altitude of about 300 km above the geosynchronous orbit, getting a 'ride' as a secondary payload in the fairing of the rocket carrying a communications satellite. A joint American-Israeli proposal for this project was submitted to NASA by a team from Caltech/JPL (Jet Propulsion Laboratory), the Weizmann Institute of Science and Israel Aerospace Industries (IAI). The Israeli contribution will be funded by the Israel Space Agency and the launch is scheduled for early 2026.

=== INSAT-1 and INSAT-2 ===
The INSAT-1 and the INSAT-2 are two nano-satellites which were planned and developed by the Israeli Nano Satellite Association. Their purpose was to serve as a technology demonstrators.

The INSAT-1 was set to carry a miniature atomic clock and a GPS receiver. By 2021, the mission was delayed and they were never launched.

=== SHALOM Project ===
The SHALOM Project (Spaceborne Hyperspectral Applicative Land and Ocean Mission) is a joint project with the Italian Space Agency (ASI) announced on November 23, 2010. The project involves the design and development of two hyperspectral Earth observation satellites. They are set to follow the same orbit as the Cosmo SkyMed. It will integrate radar observations with observations in the visible infrared and ultraviolet. In October 2015 a memorandum of understanding was signed, and the system is slated to become fully operational in 2021. The project is expected to cost over $200 million, with the cost being split evenly between the two countries.

=== SAMSON ===
Space Autonomous Mission of Swarming & Geolocating Nano-Satellites (SAMSON) is a project initiated by the Technion's Asher Space Research Institute. SAMSON consists of three nano-satellites in formation flying to demonstrate high precision geo-location of civilian signals from the ground for rescue purposes. SAMSON is planned to implement and demonstrate Technion-developed formation-flying algorithms using the nano-satellite's propulsion system. This is a student project with technical help from multiple partners in the industry such as RAFAEL.

=== Matroshka AstroRad Radiation Experiment - Artemis 1 ===
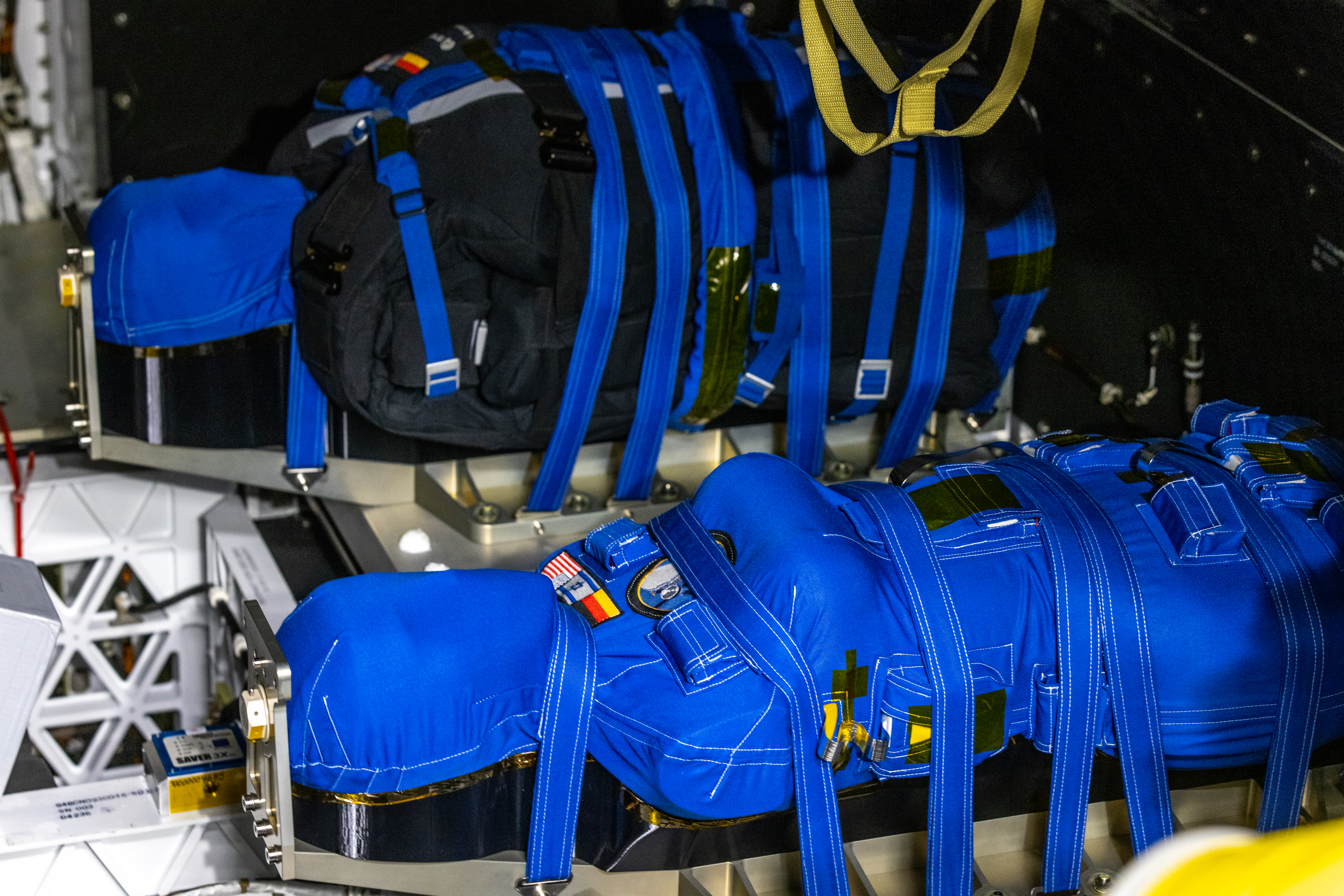
The two manikins inside the Artemis 1 Orion crew module

The Matroshka AstroRad Radiation Experiment (MARE) is a collaboration between the ISA, NASA, and the German Aerospace Center (DLR), in cooperation with Lockheed Martin and StemRad. MARE will take place aboard the Artemis 1 Orion Spacecraft, which is expected to launch from Kennedy Space Center between 2020 and 2021. The radiation environment beyond Earth's protective atmosphere is a significant impediment to human space travel. The AstroRad is a protective vest that provides mobile shielding from high energy radiation. MARE offers a unique opportunity to measure tissue dose deposition and test the effectiveness of the AstroRad vest when exposed to the harsh radiation beyond low Earth orbit. The crew compartment of the uncrewed Artemis 1 Orion spacecraft will include two female anthropomorphic phantoms that will be exposed to the intense radiation environment during the spacecraft's lunar orbit. One phantom will be shielded by the AstroRad vest and the other will be left unprotected as a control. The phantoms, designed by DLR, precisely measure radiation exposure not only at the surface of the body but also at the locations corresponding to sensitive internal organs and tissues in humans.

== Crewed programs ==
While the ISA has not yet made a human spaceflight of its own, since the mid-1990s there has been a cooperation agreement between the Israel Space Agency and NASA which has resulted in one Israeli astronaut on a NASA mission to date.

=== Ilan Ramon ===
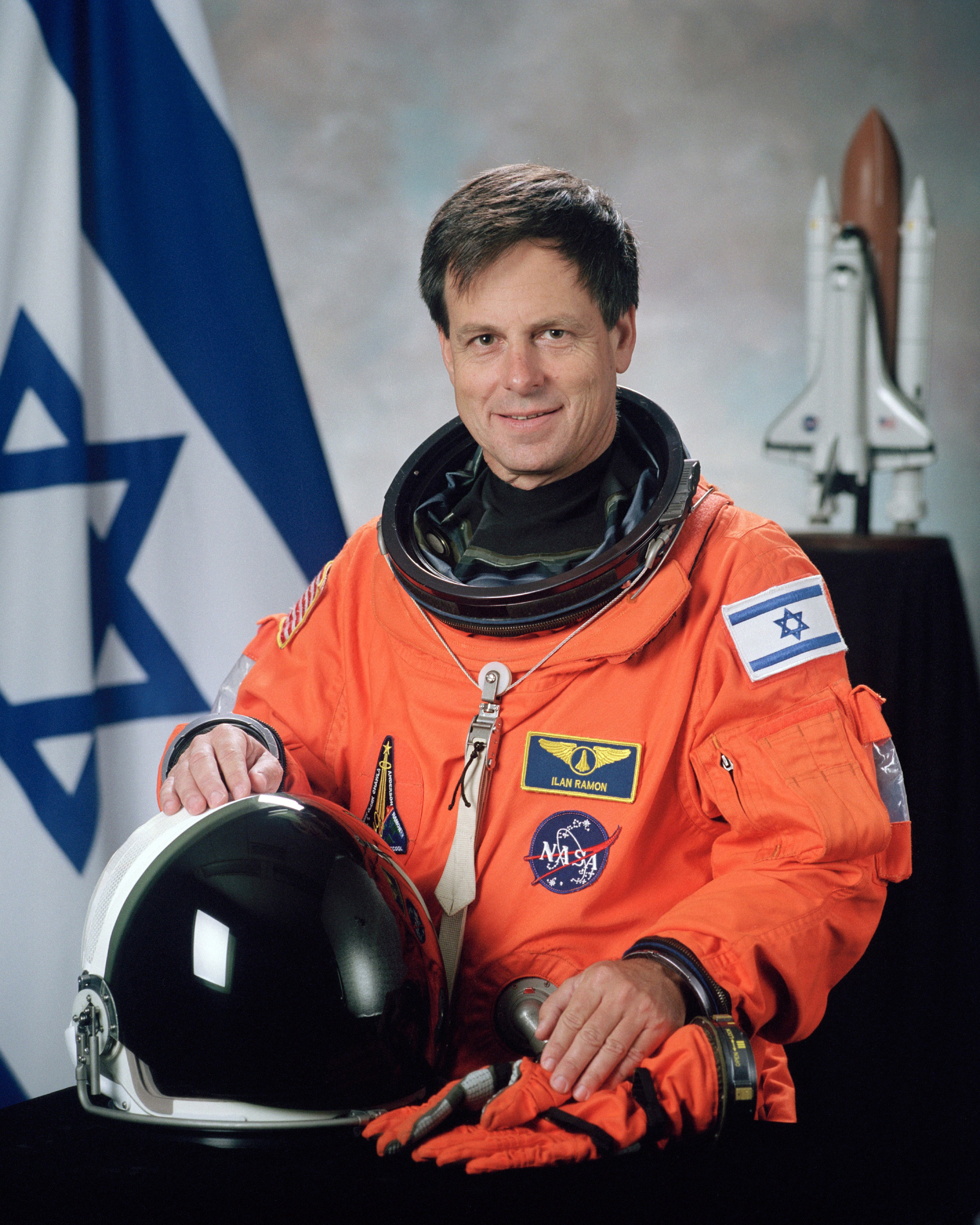
Ilan Ramon - the first Israeli astronaut

Ilan Ramon was Israel's first astronaut. Ramon was the Space Shuttle payload specialist on board the fatal STS-107 mission of Space Shuttle Columbia, in which he and the six other crew members were killed in a re-entry disaster over southern Texas. Ramon had been selected as a Payload Specialist in 1997 and trained at the Johnson Space Center, Houston, Texas, from 1998 until 2003, for a mission with a payload that included a multispectral camera for recording desert aerosol (dust).

=== Others ===
In January 2025, Israel announced an agreement with NASA to send the first Israeli woman astronaut to space. The news was shared by Israeli Minister of Innovation, Science, and Technology Gila Gamliel at the 20th Ilan Ramon International Space Conference. Almeigner reported that the selection process for the astronaut has begun, and the mission aims to inspire future generations and promote gender equality in STEM fields.

== Experiments via NASA Space Shuttles ==
The ISA has conducted a number of experiments, both crewed and uncrewed, in collaboration with NASA using the Space Shuttle. In October 1996, NASA and ISA signed an agreement for joint cooperation in the peaceful use of space - an agreement designed to develop cooperative programs of mutual interest between the two nations.

=== Israeli Space Agency Investigation About Hornets ===
The Israeli Space Agency Investigation About Hornets (ISAIAH) was a project from Tel Aviv University that was initiated in the early 1990s to explorer the effects of near-zero gravity on oriental hornets, their physical and physiological development and their nest-building instincts. The flight hardware and measuring instruments were commissioned by the ISA and built by ISI. The hope of the mission was to discover ways to prevent astronauts from suffering headaches, nausea, and vomiting during the missions.

In 1992, 230 Oriental hornets, a flight hardware and measuring instruments were packed onto the Space Shuttle Endeavour mission STS-47. The Oriental Hornets used in the experiment were capable of building combs in the direction of the gravitational vector and detecting gravitational force changes in real time.

=== Early development of embryos in microgravity ===
The early development of mice embryos in microgravity was a Hebrew University experiment designed to determine if mice embryo cells could develop normally in microgravity conditions in space. The outcome of the experiment was expected to help the understanding of early embryo cell development which would provide an insight into the possibilities of human reproduction in space. The payload was launched in 1996 on board Space Shuttle Columbia mission STS-80.

On the same mission, a second experiment investigating the growth of osteoblast cells in microgravity environment was also conducted. During STS-80 osteoblast cultures were grown in microgravity, using specialized hardware. The space-grown osteoblastic cells were then compared with the Earth-grown osteoblastic cells. The research revealed numerous changes between the two cells. The microgravity cells showed lower proliferation rate, a lower metabolism and an altered cell structure.

A continuation from the osteoblast cells experiment was later expanded upon by astronaut John Glenn on board Space Shuttle Discovery, STS-95. The tests included the thinning effect of space on mouse bones. Additionally the process of calcium loss in the mouse bone was later compared to what happened in Glenn's body and effectiveness of a calcium-vitamin D supplement against osteoporosis.

=== MEIDEX ===
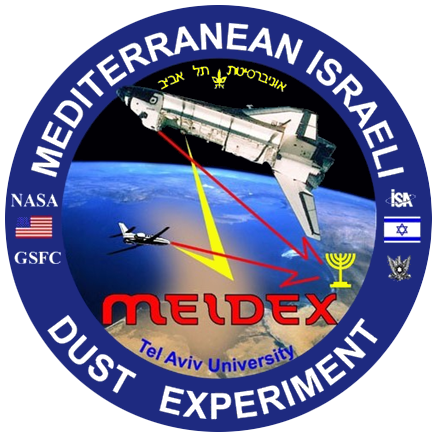
MEIDEX Seal

The 2003 Mediterranean Israeli Dust Experiment (MEIDEX) was a Dust Experiment initiated by the ISA. The experiment was planned by a team from the Department of Geophysics and Planetary Sciences in Tel Aviv University. The objective was to study the temporal and spatial distribution and physical properties of atmospheric desert dust over North Africa, the Mediterranean and the Atlantic Saharan regions. The aim was achieved by a remote sensing experiment operated by the astronaut Ilan Ramon aboard the Space Shuttle Columbia.

== Moon mission ==
The Israeli Space Agency has sponsored the first Israeli effort to land a spacecraft on the Moon. Additionally the ISA has been collaborating with NASA about future lunar research programs.

=== Israel Network for Lunar Science and Exploration ===
The Israel Network for Lunar Science and Exploration (INLSE) program was established by the Israeli Space Agency part of an international effort to study the Moon and the Solar System. In January 2010 a joint declaration by NASA and Israel Space Agency was signed making Israel a member of the NASA Center for Moon Research and promote cooperation between the two agencies. The INLSE hopes to bring its technical and engineering expertise for the sake of advancing the broad goals of lunar science at the institute. The agreement offers NASA important research involving lasers, the development of advanced sensors for Solar System research tasks and automatic vehicle navigation.

=== SpaceIL ===
The SpaceIL is a non-governmental organization made up of multidisciplinary team of Israeli scientists and space aficionados. The organization was formed to compete in the international Google Lunar X Prize competition.

The SpaceIL team developed a robotic spacecraft, built as a microsatellite, weighing around 500 kg. It was designed to be launched and then land on the Moon bearing the Israeli flag. To win, they must have been the first to launch, fly, and land the spacecraft on the Moon then transmit live video feed back to Earth. The team intended to donate the prize, about $30 million, toward space education, if they won it.

On 11 April 2019, Beresheet crash-landed on the lunar surface. Prior to impact, the probe had been able to take two last photographs: a view of itself against the Moon, and a closer shot of the Moon's surface.

On 13 April 2019, Morris Kahn announced that a new mission, named Beresheet 2 would attempt a second time to land on the Moon. The planned date is 2024. At World Space Week in Dubai, in October 2021, Israel and the UAE ministers of science and technology announced plans for cooperation on the mission. Said Kahn to the Global Investment Forum in Dubai, "It would be wonderful if we could develop a space program that would be a combination of Israel and the Arab world, "I would welcome it – if it fits in with the program the Emirates have. They have an ambitious program."

In January 2025 it was announced that the Italian space agency and the Israeli space agency will collaborate on the Beresheet 2 mission. The joint lunar exploration initiative was established through a Memorandum of Understanding signed between the Israel Space Agency (ISA) and the Italian Space Agency (ASI). The agreement was formalized by ISA Director-General Brig. Gen. Uri Oron and ASI President Prof. Teodoro Velente during the 20th Ilan Ramon International Space Conference in Tel Aviv. According to Globes the collaboration facilitates joint development of advanced technologies, such as landing sensors, communications systems, navigation, and control mechanisms. Although the final budget is yet to be decided, preliminary estimates suggest funding will exceed €10 million.

== Commercial and industry involvement ==
The Israel Space Agency, Israeli industry, and the academy are all heavily involved in all the different stages of planning, development, construction, launching, and operating of space programs.

The main contractors of the Ofeq and Eros space programs is the IAI Mabat factory in Yehud. The Mabat facility is responsible for the experiment and integration center, the ground monitoring, and the control stations and the remote satellites receiving stations. Many of the high-tech companies are involved in the various space programs in Israel, and in manufacturing sub-systems and components.

The TAUVEX was spun off as DAVID, a small telescope with a resolution of about five meters. It is currently being developed jointly by an Israeli hi-tech firm and a German firm. Many smaller university-related commercial products are being developed across the state.

== Industrial groups ==
In addition to university research, a number of large industrial groups are heavily involved with the Israel Space Agency.

=== IAI ===
The Israel Aerospace Industries (IAI) is Israel's prime aerospace and aviation manufacturer, producing aerial systems for both military and civilian usage. IAI entered the space race in the 1990s and has since been responsible for the development of most Israel's civilian and military satellites, particularly the AMOS and Ofeq.

=== Elbit Systems ===
El-Op, which merged with Elbit Systems in 2000, is the country's largest research and development company for space-qualified cameras and advanced telescopes that deal with various panchromatic, dual band, multi and super spectral wavelength applications. It is Israel's Center of Excellence for space electro-optics.

=== Rafael Advanced Defense Systems ===
Rafael Advanced Defense Systems is the Israeli authority for development of weapons and military technology. They are responsible for most of the ISA's spacecraft propulsion systems.

== Agency managers/directors ==
- Dror Sadeh
- David Abir
- Akiva Bar-Nun 1989 - 1993
- Marcel Klein
- Aby Har Even (Avi Har-Even) January 1995 - September 2004
- Zvi Kaplan September 2004 - September 2011
- Menachem Kidron January 2012 - 2015
- Avi Blasberger May 2016- August 2021
- Uri Oron September 2021 - August 2025

== Agency chairperson ==
- Yuval Ne'eman (1983-2005)
- Yitzhak Ben Israel (2005-2022)
- Dan Blumberg (2022-2025)
- Shimrit Maman (2025-)

== See also ==
- List of government space agencies
- National Committee for Space Research
- Science, Technology and Space Minister of Israel
- Economy of Israel
- List of multinationals with research and development centres in Israel
- List of space agencies
- Science and technology in Asia
