= National Committee for Space Research =

Israeli space research organization

Committee overview
- Formed: 1960
- Superseding Committee: Israel Space Agency (1983)
- Headquarters: Jerusalem, Israel
- Minister responsible: Daniel Weihs, Chairman

The National Committee for Space Research (NCSR) was a committee established in 1960 by the Israeli Government in affiliation with the Israel Academy of Sciences and Humanities to explore the feasibility of space launches and satellites development, and to formulate the Israel Space Agency. The committee was made of a group dedicated to the research and development of space-related sciences, and to demonstrate Israeli capabilities to its neighbors at the time, especially Egypt.

== History ==
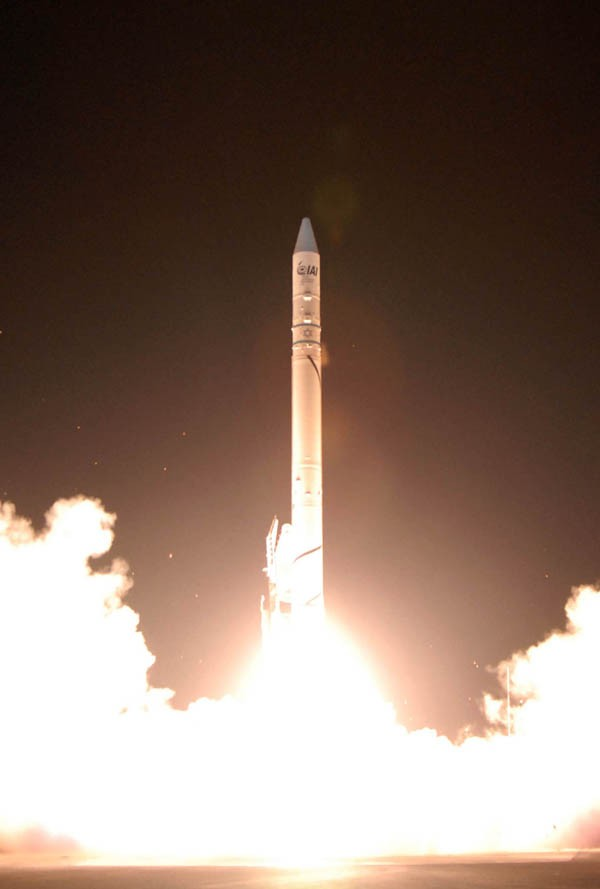
Shavit launcher being operated by the Israel Space Agency

=== 1960s ===
The Israeli Space Agency originated as university-based research project from Tel-Aviv University in the early 1960s. In 1960, the National Committee for Space Research (NCSR) was formed by the Israel Academy of Sciences and Humanities. The committee was formed to increase research activities across the academic communities in Israel. While at the time, establishing a space program was not particularly one of its goals, during the '60s through the late '70s, the committee developed the infrastructure needed for research and development in space exploration and sciences. One of the NCSR's earliest achievements took place in 1961 with the launch of its first two-stage rocket.

=== Reliance on foreign countries ===
At the same time, Israel's missile program was also established. As with other countries, the ballistic and other missile development took precedence over space. The Israeli Space Launch Vehicle (SLVs) was developed as an off-shot of its Ballistic Missile (BM) program. This interdependency resulted in a blurry line between civilian and military developments in Israel. Contractors, such as IAI, that were responsible for building defense missiles were also the main contractors for the Shavit space rocket.

Due to the stressed relationship between Israel and its neighbors, Israel has always attempted to acquire intelligence from various sources. During the late 60s it was thought that the IDF received satellite imagery from the US; however the resolution was degraded, the coverage was limited, and it was not in real-time. Following the Yom Kippur War, Israel started changing their focus to developing an independent source of space-based intelligence. This opinion was strengthen after it became known that the US withheld critical intelligence information during the war, obtained by reconnaissance satellites, on Arab offensive formation. Despite the close defense corporation with the US, Israel did not have routine access to real-time satellite intelligence data. The Defense Ministry was quoted saying "For years we have been begging the Americans for more detailed pictures from their satellites and often got refusals - even when Iraqi Scud missiles were falling on Tel Aviv..."

=== Proposal for Israeli satellite ===
Following the political tension by Egypt and Syria, reconnaissance flights became evermore difficult. In 1979, then, Israel's DMI, Major General Yehoshua Sagi told the defense ministry that the only solution was overhead photography satellite which would bypass the political obstacles and take imagery of points of interests without generating diplomatic problems. The idea was met with great resistance; nevertheless a feasibility study projects was initiated on the production of satellite launcher, satellites, and telescope cameras by the Israel Aerospace Industries, the Rafael Advanced Defense Systems, and Electro-Optics industries. The three contractors were asked to complete their study in ten months.

The study was completed by late 1980; Saguy requested from prime minister Menachem Begin that the project proceed to its next phase. While the project received the go-ahead, Israel's defense industries suffered significant budget shortage following the Iranian Revolution when military corporation between the two countries ended. The financial constraint were slowly resolved by IAI tying up with South Africa for budgetary support.

In 1982, a new recommendation called "Ofeq Program" was submitted for developing an observation satellite. The program included timelines, planning for a ground station, budget estimates, and personnel requirements. The primary goals was to develop a satellite program without relying on any foreign know-how, to allow flexibility and creativity. The launcher would be developed by Malam, the two engines by the Israel Military Industries (IMI), and the third by Rafael.

=== Establishment of a Space Agency ===
At the end of 1982 it was decided during a closed-door meeting to establish and Israeli space agency. The decision was made by PM Menachem Begin, Defense minister Ariel Sharon, and former director Aharon Beit Halahmi. The initial goal was to pursue the program to develop to Ofeq and the Shavit launchers. In January 1983, the Israeli government authorized the Minister of Science and Technology Prof. Yuval Ne'eman to establish an Israeli Space Agency with the goal of advancing Israel's space program, unlike the NCSR which was primarily used for feasibility and infrastructure studies. In July 1983, the ISA was official founded in Tel Aviv to coordinate the nation's space program in affiliation to the Ministry of Science, Culture & Sport.

== See also ==
- Israel Space Agency
- Science and technology in Israel
- Economy of Israel
- List of multinationals with research and development centres in Israel
- Science and technology in Asia
- Science and Technology Minister of Israel
