= Noah Brosch =

Israeli astrophysicist (born 1948)

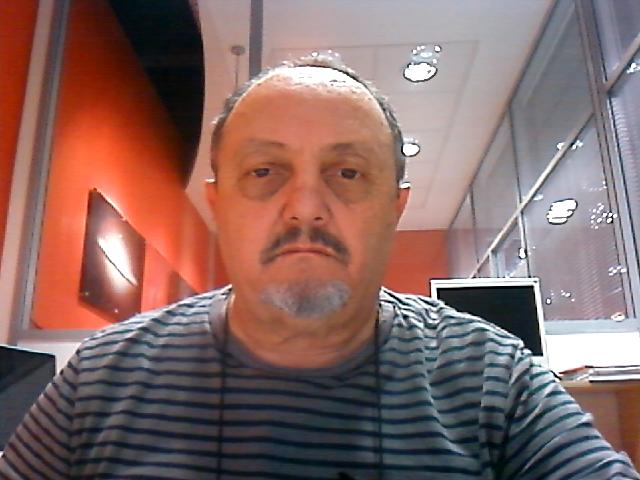
Noah Brosch

Noah Brosch (Hebrew: נח ברוש; born 1948) is an Israeli astronomer, astrophysicist and space researcher.

== Biography ==
Noah Brosch was born in Bucharest (Romania) in 1948 and immigrated with his family to Israel in 1963.

Brosch studied at Tel Aviv University (BSc 1975 and MSc 1977) and at the Leiden University (PhD 1983). He is a tenured Principal Research Associate (degree equivalent to Research Associate Professor) at Tel Aviv University and served as Director of the Wise Observatory from 2000 to 2006 and again from 2007 to 2010. He is a member of the International Astronomical Union (IAU) and from 2009 to 2012 served as the Vice-President of its Division XI (Space and High-Energies Astrophysics) of the IAU.

Noah Brosch has been active in the field of space ultraviolet (UV) astronomy, as one of the founding members of the Network for Ultraviolet Astrophysics (NUVA), a pan-European network set-up to identify the needs of the astronomical community in the UV spectral domain and eventually propose actions to structure it around new projects.

Brosch retired from his academic position in May 2017 (age limit for Tel Aviv University academics) but remains an active researcher retaining his office, observing time allocation, etc.

== TAUVEX ==
Brosch was the Principal Investigator of the TAUVEX space telescope array from 1989 to 2011. TAUVEX was intended to study the ultraviolet sky in spectral bands not observable from the ground by using three co-aligned telescopes, each imaging the same one-degree wide sky region. Because of these innovative aspects, TAUVEX was selected in 1988 by the Israel Space Agency (ISA) as its first priority experiment to be launched in space, but its promised satellite and launcher never materialized. The TAUVEX project was cancelled by ISA after attempts to launch it as an associated payload on the Spektr-RG platform (led by the Soviet Union) between 1991 and 2000, then later from 2000 to 2010 on the Indian GSAT-4 spacecraft, failed for various reasons. ISA also refused to let the fight model of TAUVEX be used for balloon flights that could have yielded valuable information in a spectral band around 200 nm.

== Research and achievements ==
Brosch and Adi Zitrin, his MSc student, identified a possible dark matter filament relatively close to the Milky Way and the Local Group in the form of a chain of galaxies in the local void . The reality of this galaxy filament, and the identification of another, shorter filament in the same neighborhood, was confirmed by McQuinn et al. (2014). Together with another student, he showed that many near-Earth asteroids are probably only "rubble piles" so that attempts to mitigate possible future impacts by such asteroids using exploding nuclear devices might not be successful.

Noah Brosch organized a campaign to observe the Leonid meteor shower in 1999 that included ground teams in Israel equipped with intensified video cameras and airborne observations from two NASA aircraft that deployed to Ben Gurion airport in Israel in order to observe meteors from a high altitude together with the ground teams and with a powerful phased-array radar in Israel. A description of the campaign and some of the results were published in the book "Leonid Storm Research" .

Noah Brosch was fascinated very early in his scientific career by the unique appearance of Hoag's Object, a very round ring galaxy and published a number of papers on this topic. Together with his student Ido Finkelman, and with colleagues from Russia and the Netherlands, they showed that the visible ring is part of an even larger ring of neutral hydrogen and proposed that the ring represents material accreted by the elliptical core at least one billion years ago. Hoag's Object would, therefore, represent a much undisturbed galaxy .

Brosch and colleagues, and other students, investigated the properties of extragalactic dust by concentrating on elliptical galaxies with dark lanes. Modeling the light distribution of the unaffected parts of a galaxy, and subtracting from it the detected light distribution, they derived the amount of light missing because of the dust obscuration. Repeating this with different filters, they found that it is possible to derive the extinction law by the dust in the target galaxy which measures essentially the typical size of dust grains. Since this size is of order 0.1 micron while the typical distance to the galaxies studied is of order 50 Mpc, the ratio of sizes is 31 orders of magnitude.

Noah Brosch and his students investigate various aspects of star formation in galaxies. Important contributions were made in the field of dwarf galaxies, as well as on the influence of the environment in the formation and evolution of galaxies.

Brosch discovered the atmosphere of Pluto in 1985 by observing the occultation of a star by the then-considered outermost planet in the Solar System. This observation was analyzed in a paper published much later.

Minor planet 26282 Noahbrosch is named in his honor.

== Publications ==
Brosch is an author of many scientific papers and of outreach publications. He published alone or with colleagues a number of books. One of his semi-popular books is Sirius Matters, a scientific monograph about the star Sirius.
