= NIVR =

NIVR is a four-letter abbreviation with multiple meanings, as described below:

- Netherlands Agency for Aerospace Programmes
- Network Interactive Voice Response, see Interactive voice response
- Neuron Interactive Virtual Reality, see Virtual reality
