= SHALOM (satellite) =

Israel-Italian satellite system

Spaceborne Hyperspectral Applicative Land and Ocean Mission
- Mission type: Earth Observation, Research
- Operator: ASI; ISA
- Mission duration: 5 years (planned)

Spacecraft properties
- Bus: ISA
- Manufacturer: El-Op; IAI; Selex ES; Thales Alenia Space
- Launch mass: 385 kg

Start of mission
- Rocket: Vega-C
- Launch site: Guiana Space Centre, ELV
- Contractor: Arianespace

Instruments
- Hyperspectral Imaging Spectrometer; Panchromatic camera Spectral ranges VNR/SWIR Spectrometers

Spaceborne Hyperspectral Applicative Land and Ocean Mission (SHALOM) is a joint mission by the Israeli Space Agency and the Italian Space Agency to develop a hyperspectral satellite.

== History ==
The mission was agreed upon in late 2010, and was originally intended to build two commercial hyperspectral satellites. Preliminary studies for the program started in 2012, with Phase A completed in 2013. A Joint Integrated Team from Italy and Israel perform preliminary definition and studies until 2014. By 2014, the project has evolved into building only one satellite. Phase B1 started in 2017 and was expected to last 12 months.

In October 2015 a memorandum of understanding was signed, and the system was slated to become fully operational in 2021, later pushed to 2022. The project is expected to cost over $200 million, with the cost being split evenly between the two countries. As of 2020, the satellite was expected to launch in 2025 on a Vega launch vehicle.

== Objectives ==
The joint mission is expected to build a hyperspectral Earth observation satellite that will occupy the same orbit as the older Italian satellite, COSMO-SkyMed which was launched in 2007. The satellites will be equipped with instruments targeting the visible and infrared wavelengths in the 400 nm to 2700 nm range.

The satellite will use the OPTSAT-3000 satellite platform built by Israel Aerospace Industries, and is expected to be about 385 kg. The payload will be limited to 120 kg and is expected be equipped with:

- Panchromatic camera with a 2.5-m GSD,
- Commercial Hyper-spectral Imaging Spectrometer (0.2-2.5 μm)
- Infrared camera (4-12 μm)
- Spectral ranges (contiguous spectrum):
  - Visible and near-infrared imaging spectrometers of 8 m in the 400-1010 nm range
  - Short-wavelength infrared range imaging spectrometers of 10 m GSD in the 920–2700 nm range

== See also ==
- Italian Space Agency
- Israel Space Agency
