= Sloshsat-FLEVO =

- Mission type: Microgravity research
- Operator: ESA; NLR; ISA
- COSPAR ID: 2005-005C
- SATCAT no.: 28544
- Website: most.gov.il/English/space/projects/Pages/SLOSHSAT.aspx http://www.esa.int/export/esaMI/Launchers_Home/SEMNFZ0XDYD_0.html

Spacecraft properties
- Manufacturer: NLR/Rafael
- Launch mass: 129 kilograms (284 lb)

Start of mission
- Launch date: 12 February 2005, 21:03:01 UTC
- Rocket: Ariane 5ECA
- Launch site: Kourou ELA-3
- Contractor: Arianespace

Orbital parameters
- Reference system: Geocentric
- Regime: Geosynchronous transfer
- Perigee altitude: 266 kilometres (165 mi)
- Apogee altitude: 35,726 kilometres (22,199 mi)
- Inclination: 6.7 degrees
- Period: 631.19 minutes
- Epoch: 14 April 2005

SLOSHSAT-FLEVO (Sloshsat Facility for Liquid Experimentation and Verification in Orbit) is a microsatellite launched to investigate the dynamics of fluids in microgravity. FLEVO stands for Facility for Liquid Experimentation and Verification in Orbit. Multiple sensors were used to monitor the behavior of water in an instrumented tank and how sloshing affects the attitude control of launchers and space vehicles.

The project is a joint program between ESA, the Netherlands Agency for Aerospace Programmes, and the Israel Space Agency. The primary contractor is the National Aerospace Laboratory providing the spacecraft structure and power systems. The ejection system and ground support equipment were contracted by NEWTEC. The ISA was responsible for supplying the sub-propulsion system which was built and assembled by Rafael.

== Spacecraft ==
The spacecraft itself is a 90-cm cube microsatellite covered by solar cells and fitted with 12 small thrusters.

== Launch ==
Originally Sloshsat-FLEVO was to be launched from the Space Shuttle and use the shuttle as a data relay, but after the Space Shuttle Columbia disaster the satellite was modified to be launched on board the Ariane-5 qualification flight. The satellite was launched from the Guiana Space Centre launch site at Kourou, French Guiana on 12 February 2005.

== Experiment ==
The SLOSHSAT-FLEVO is the first satellite entirely dedicated to liquid research in space. The satellite was equipped with an 87-litre cylindrical tank containing 33.5 litres of de-ionised water. 270 sensors were placed on the tank's walls to measure the sloshing behavior by calculating the thickness of the water. Three accelerometers and a fibre-optic gyroscope were used to measure the motion of the spacecraft. An array of temperature, pressure and fluid velocity sensors were also installed on the craft.

After depletion of the propellants and completion of the experiment, the satellite was turned off. The satellite had a lifetime of around 14 days. ESA estimate that without active debris removal the orbit would decay by 2335.

== See also ==
- European Space Agency
- Israel Space Agency
