= Yoav Har-Even =

Israeli general and executive

- יואב הר-אבן
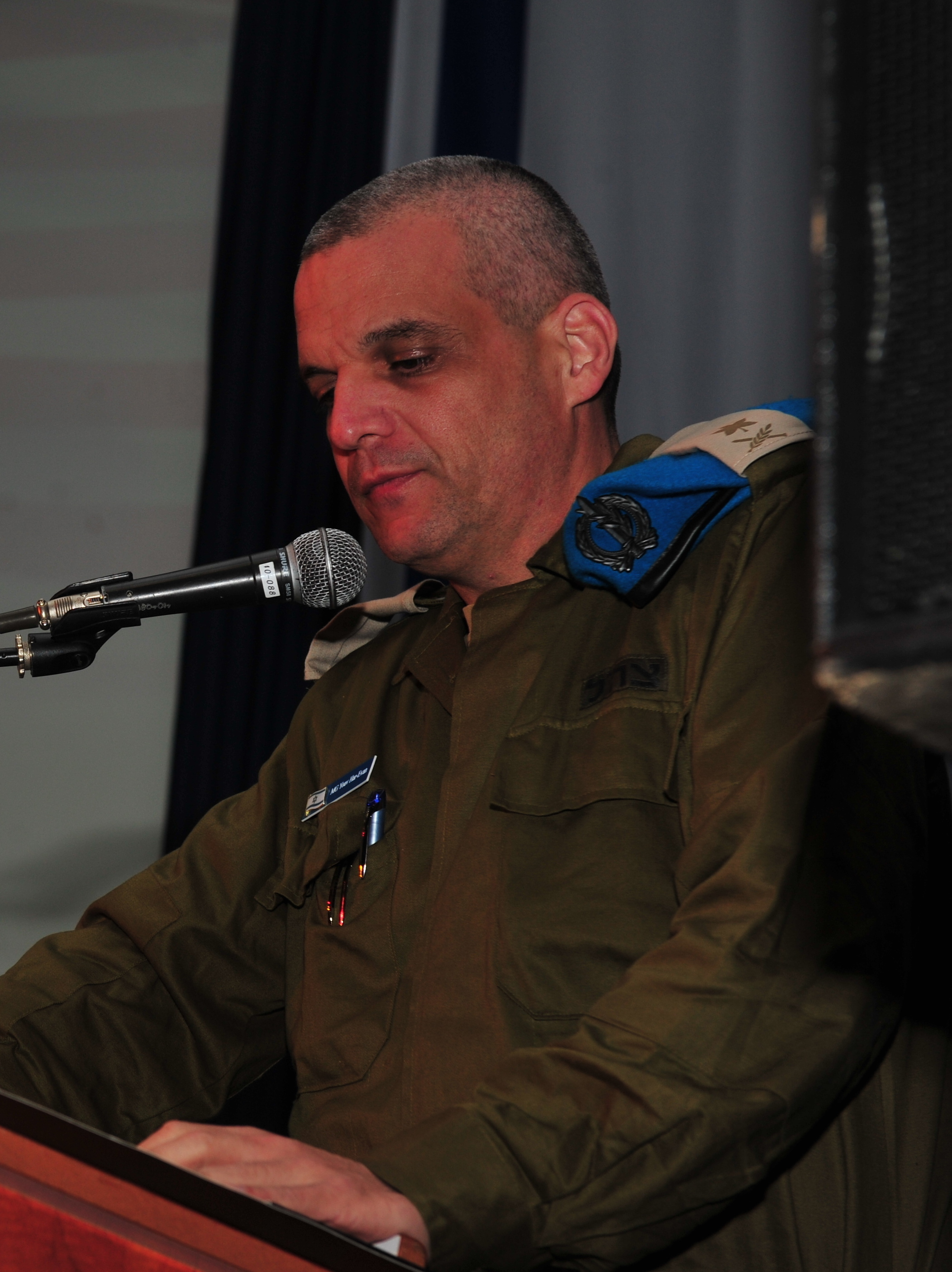
- Maj. Gen.(ret.) Yoav Har-Even
- Born: Israel
- Military career
- Allegiance: Israel
- Branch: Operations Branch
- Rank: Major General
- Unit: General Staff
- Commands: 55th Battalion Commander; Artillery Corps Officers Course Commander; Head of the Chief of Staff Office; 973rd Eged Artillery Commander; Pillar of Fire Artillery Formation Commander; HaMapatz Armored Formation Commander; Company and Battalion Commanders Training Course Commander; Head of the Manpower Directorate Planning Division; Head of GOC Army Headquarters; Head of Operations Directorate
- Conflicts: First Intifada, South Lebanon Conflict, Second Intifada, Operation Cast Lead

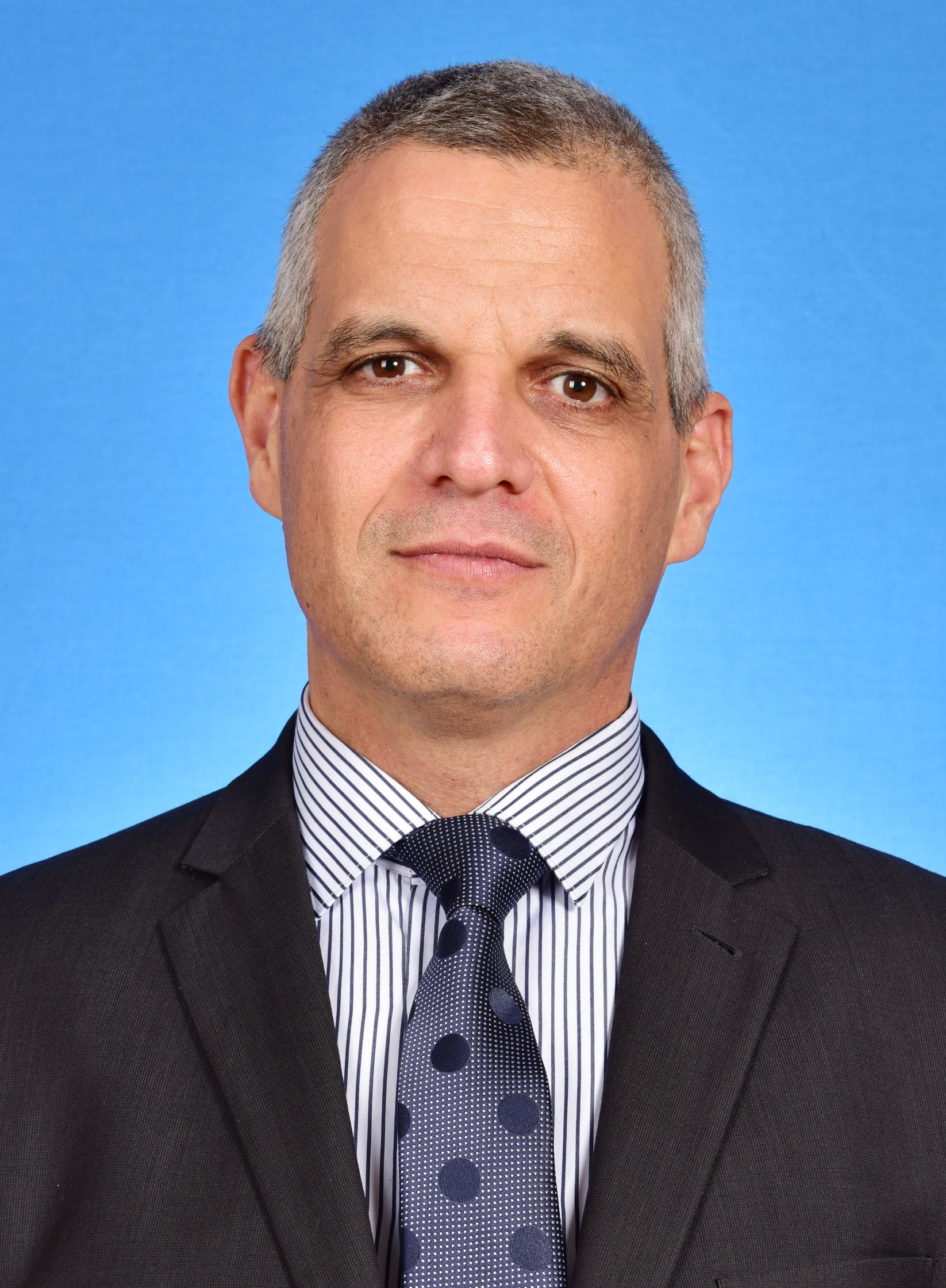
Yoav Har-Even, Former President and CEO, Rafael Advanced Defense Systems Ltd.

Maj. Gen.(ret.) Yoav Har-Even (Hebrew: יואב הר-אבן) was president and CEO of Rafael Advanced Defense Systems Ltd. Before joining Rafael in 2015, he served as head of the Israel Defense Forces Operations Directorate. Prior to that, he was commander of the 319th Division and head of the GOC Army Headquarters.

== Background ==
Maj. Gen.(ret.) Har-Even has been president and CEO of Rafael since 2015 up until 2024. Before joining Rafael he served in the Israeli Defense Force (IDF) for 34 years in various positions. He started his military career in the IDF Artillery Corps. Between 1993 and 1995, he was commander of the Pillar of Fire Artillery Formation 55th Battalion. He later commanded an Artillery Corps Officers School at Shivta Base. In 1997, he was appointed head of the Chief of Staff Office, serving under Shaul Mofaz. In 2000, he was promoted to colonel and appointed commander of the reserve 973 Eged Artillery Battalion. In 2002, he was appointed commander of the Pillar of Fire Artillery Formation. In 2005, he was promoted to brigadier general and appointed commander of the HaMapatz Armored Corps Formation. He served in this capacity during the Second Lebanon War, as well as commanding a company and battalion commanders training course at the same time.

== Promotions ==
From September 2008 to August 2011, he was head of Manpower Directorate Planning Division and head of the GOC Army Headquarters. He was a project manager in the General Staff Planning Directorate. In August 2012, he was promoted to major general. From September 2012, he was head of the Operations Directorate.

== Family ==
He is the son of Aby Har-Even, who was the fifth Director General of the Israel Space Agency. He is married and a father of three. He has a bachelor's degree in economics and political science, and a master's degree in business from Tel Aviv University.

== Bibliography ==
- Har-Even, Yoav (July 2018). "The Battlefield – From Cooperation and Integration to Fusion of Capabilities" (PDF). The Dado Center Journal. 16–17.
- Har-Even, Yoav (July 2014). "The General Staff Learning System between Conservatism and Change - The Operational Concept as a Test Case". The Dado Center Journal. 2.
