= Netherlands Space Agency =

Space agency of the Netherlands

Agency overview
- Formed: 1 July 2009 (3 March 2026 as NLSA)
- Preceding agencies: Netherlands Agency for Aerospace Programmes; various government- and other tasks that were integrated into NSO.
- Headquarters: The Hague, Netherlands
- Minister responsible: Heleen Herbert, Minister of Economic Affairs and Climate Policy
- Agency executive: Harm van de Wetering, General Director
- Website: nlsa.nl

The Netherlands Space Agency (NLSA), is the government space agency of the Netherlands.

== Creation ==
Three Dutch government ministries — the Ministry of Economic Affairs and Climate Policy; the Ministry of Education, Culture and Science; and the Ministry of Infrastructure and Water Management — along with the Netherlands Organization for Scientific Research (NWO), an independent administrative body under the auspices of the Ministry of Education, Culture and Science, signed an agreement in October 2008 for the establishment of a space agency.

The agency, called Netherlands Space Office (NSO) was established on 1 July 2009 following the merger of the space activities of the Netherlands Agency for Aerospace Programmes (Dutch: Nederlands Instituut voor Vliegtuigontwikkeling en Ruimtevaart (NIVR)), which was then disestablished, and several other institutes such as the KNMI and SRON.

On March 3rd 2026, the agency was renamed to the Netherlands Space Agency (NLSA).

== Purpose ==
The NLSA was established by the Dutch government to advise on the Netherlands’ Space Policy and to develop and administer the country's space programme. The NLSA represents the Netherlands in international space organisations, including the multi-country-member European Space Agency (ESA); the United States National Aeronautics and Space Administration (NASA) and the Japan Aerospace Exploration Agency (JAXA). The NLSA is also the central government point of contact for the space community in the Netherlands.

The NLSA also promotes education and communication on space, especially the Netherlands’ space activities.

== Administration ==
The director of the NLSA reports to the steering committee of the ministries. In terms of organisation and administration, the NLSA is an independent part the Netherlands Enterprise Agency, an agency of the Ministry of Economic Affairs and Climate Policy.

== See also ==
- List of government space agencies
- European Space Agency (ESA)
- Japan Aerospace Exploration Agency (JAXA)
- National Aeronautics and Space Administration (NASA)
- Netherlands Agency for Aerospace Programmes (Dutch: Nederlands Instituut voor Vliegtuigontwikkeling en Ruimtevaart (NIVR))
- Netherlands Institute for Space Research
