= VENμS =

Earth observation microsatellite

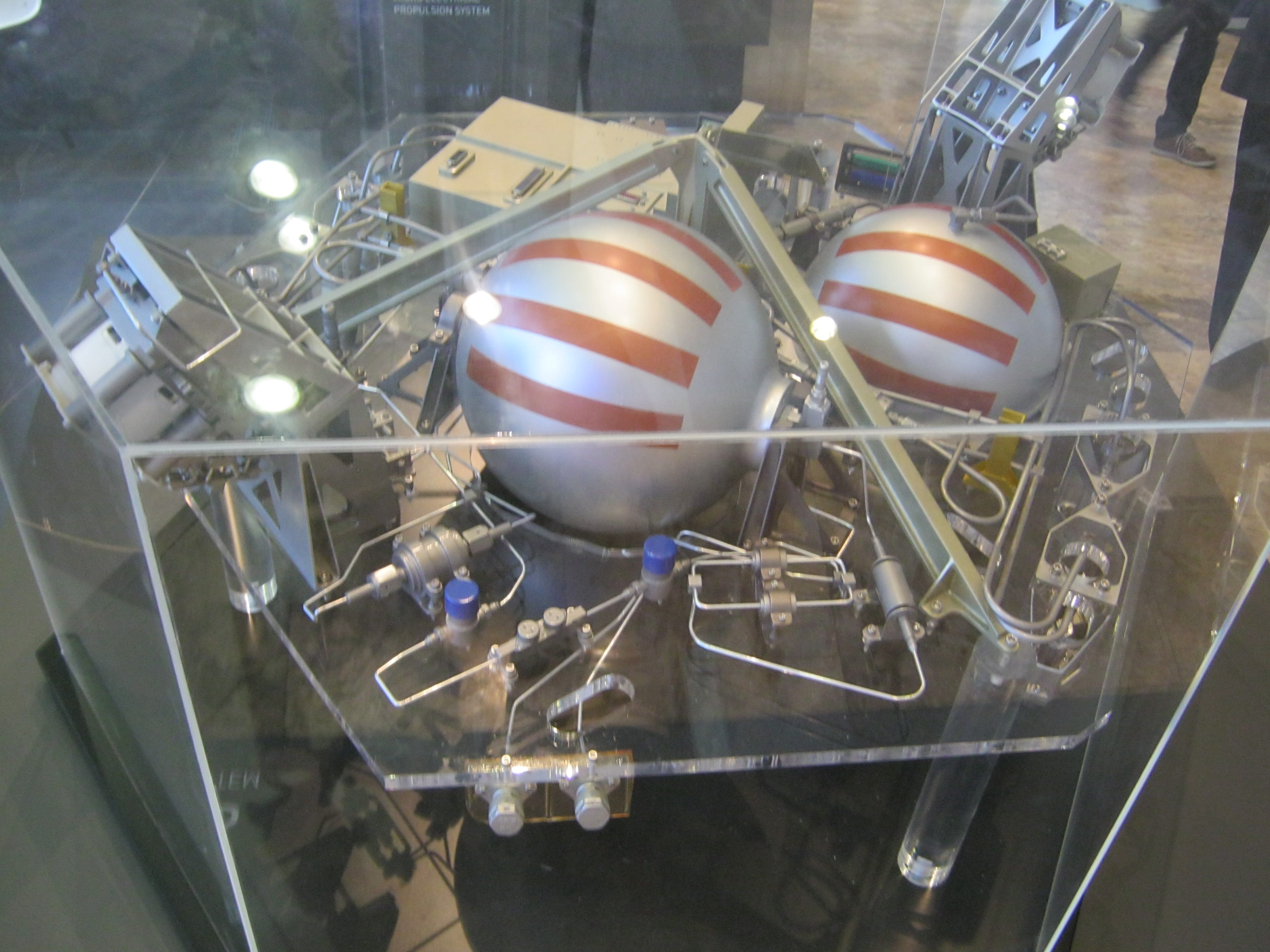
- Mission type: Earth observation Technology
- Operator: ISA/CNES
- COSPAR ID: 2017-044B
- SATCAT no.: 42901
- Website: venus.cnes.fr/fr
- Mission duration: 7 years

Spacecraft properties
- Bus: ISA
- Manufacturer: IAI; Rafael; CNES
- Launch mass: 265 kilograms (584 lb) (wet mass, of which 23 kg are fuel)
- Power: 800 watts

Start of mission
- Launch date: 2 August 2017 01:58:33
- Rocket: Vega
- Launch site: Kourou
- Contractor: Arianespace

End of mission
- Declared: August 2024

Orbital parameters
- Reference system: Geocentric
- Regime: Sun-synchronous 2 day repeating
- Perigee altitude: 720 km (first phase) / 410 km (second phase)
- Apogee altitude: 720 km (first phase) / 410 km (second phase)
- Inclination: 98.27 degrees

Main telescope
- Name: Ritchey-Chretien telescope
- Type: Cassegrain reflector
- Diameter: 0.25m
- Focal length: 1.75m
- Collecting area: 50 special interest sites

Instruments
- Super Spectral Camera (VSSC), Israeli Hall Effect Thruster (IHET)
- VENμS Insignia

Vegetation and Environment monitoring on a New Micro-Satellite (VENμS) is a near polar Sun-synchronous orbit microsatellite. It is a joint project of the Israeli Space Agency and CNES. The project was started in April 2005 and was launched on 2 August 2017. The microsatellite was designed and built by IAI and Rafael under ISA's supervision at a cost of US$20 million for the ISA and €10 million for CNES.

For the mission, CNES is responsible for supplying the superspectral camera and the science mission center. The ISA is responsible for the satellite control center, the technological mission and payload (Israeli Hall effect Thruster and autonomous mission), the spacecraft, and the launcher interface.

== History ==
A joint study to check feasibility of the program was done in the first half of 2005. Phase A started in 2005 and upon completion, a memorandum of understanding was signed between the ISA and CNES. The satellite was originally planned to be launched in 2008; however due to changes of the launchers and several delays, the launch date was pushed to 2 August 2017. It was launched via a Vega launcher from Guiana Space Centre together with Italian satellite OPTSAT-3000.

After multiple mission extensions, the satellite was retired in August 2024 after expending all of its fuel.

== Mission ==
The satellite has a scientific and a technological mission. Scientific mission requirements were defined by Centre d'Etudes Spatiales de la BIOsphère, France, and Ben-Gurion University of the Negev, Israel, and CNES. Technological Mission requirement were defined by Rafael.

=== Scientific mission ===
The satellite has a 2-day revisit orbit which allows constant viewing angles at constant Sun lighting angles. The unique combination is hoped to allow the development of new image processing methods. A set of at least 50 points of interest around the world were chosen to be scanned throughout the scientific mission. The points will be rescanned every 2 days for the entire duration of the mission where it will collect sensory and imagery data. Some of the objectives from the scientific mission are:

- Monitoring and analyzing surface under various environmental and human factors
- Develop and validate various ecosystem functioning models
- Improve and validate global carbon cycle models
- Define theoretical and practical methods for scale transfer
- Collect and analyze data collected by the low spatial resolution sensors

The satellite is equipped with a Super Spectral Camera comprises a catadioptric optical system, a focal plane assembly with narrow band filters, and 4 detector units with 3 separate CCD-TDI array. Each array with separate operational and thermal control.

The satellite is also equipped with a Ritchey-Chretien telescope with a focal length of 1.75m and a diameter of 0.25m. The telescope's tube will be covered to protect it from pollution and dust which will deploy once in orbit.

=== Technological mission ===
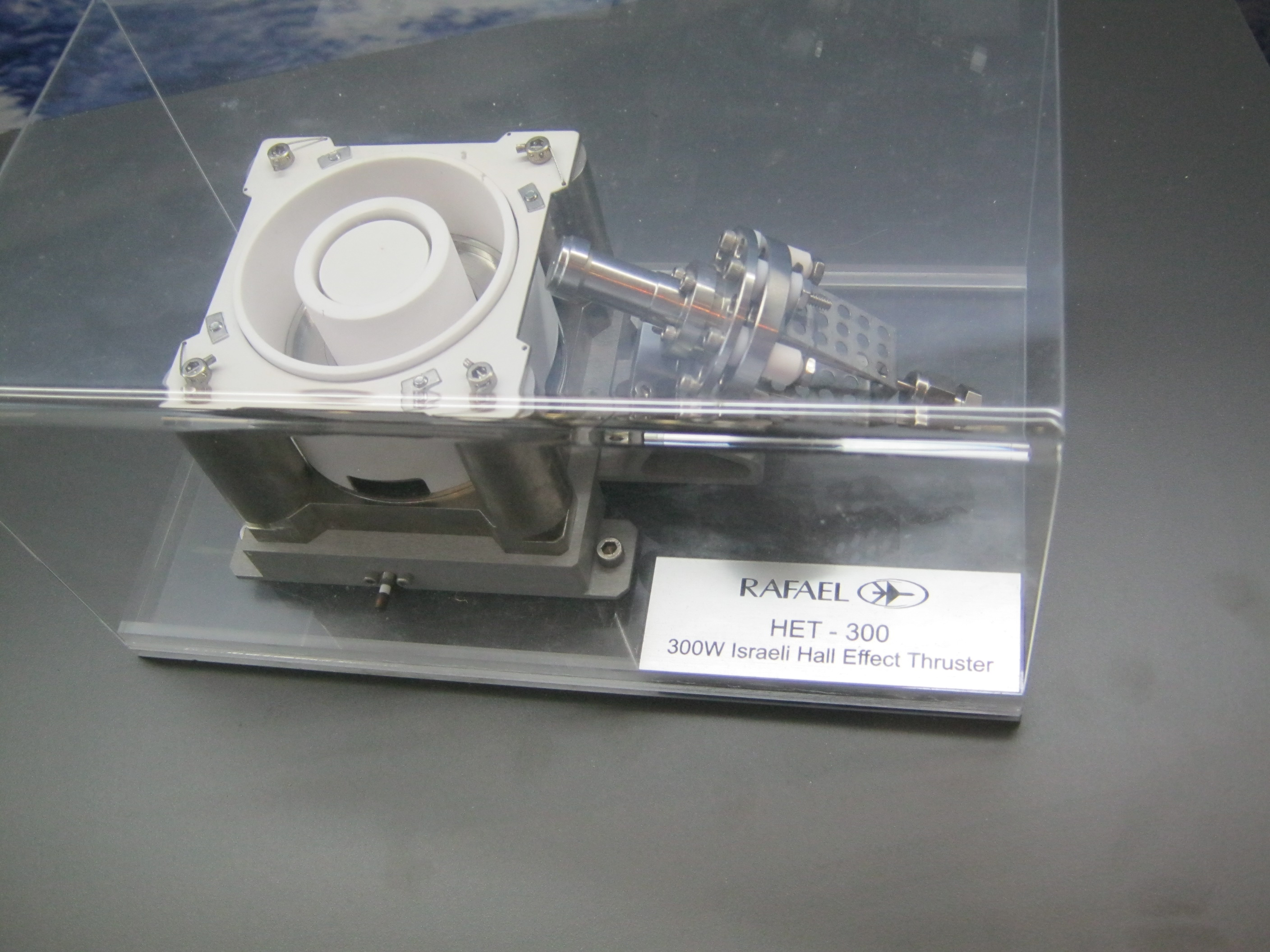
VENμS Hall effect thruster

In addition to its scientific mission, the satellite has a technological mission. The satellite is equipped with Israeli hall effect thrusters (IHET). The mission is to demonstrate the thrusters' enhanced capabilities and autonomous mission operations which include:

- Orbit maintenance
- LEO to LEO orbit transfer
- Enabling imaging mission in a high drag environment - performing the scientific mission at an altitude of 410 km on an Earth repeating sun synchronous orbit

The technological mission is designed to use 16 kg of Xenon.

== Platform ==
The satellite platform is based on the Israel Aerospace Industries OPSAT 3000 satellite platform. VENμS has a dual propulsion system: hydrazine for orbit insertion and xenon for the technological mission.

The satellite's mass is 265 kg (wet), of which 16 kg is Xenon and 7 kg is hydrazine.

== Ground control station ==
The satellite is ground controlled by IAI in Israel. The Israeli mission control is linked to two sub-stations in charge of each of the missions; the scientific mission is operated from Toulouse Space Center, France and the technology mission is controlled from the Rafael Technological Mission Center, Haifa, Israel.

== See also ==
- CNES
- Israel Space Agency
- 2014 in spaceflight
- Israel Aerospace Industries
- Vega
- Ritchey–Chrétien telescope
