= TAUVEX =

Israeli space telescope array

TAUVEX טאווקס
- Operator: Tel Aviv University
- Manufacturer: El-Op Electro-Optical Industries, part of Elbit Systems
- Instrument type: Three telescopes
- Function: UV Astronomy

Properties
- Number launched: 0

The Tel Aviv University Ultraviolet Explorer, or TAUVEX (Hebrew: טאווקס), is a space telescope array conceived by Noah Brosch of Tel Aviv University and designed and constructed in Israel for Tel Aviv University by El-Op, Electro-Optical Industries, Ltd. (a division of Elbit systems) acting as Prime Contractor, for the exploration of the ultraviolet (UV) sky. TAUVEX was selected in 1988 by the Israel Space Agency (ISA) as its first priority scientific payload. Although originally slated to fly on a national Israeli satellite of the Ofeq series, TAUVEX was shifted in 1991 to fly as part of a Spektr-RG international observatory, a collaboration of many countries with the Soviet Union (Space Research Institute) leading.

Due to repeated delays of the Spektr project, caused by the economic situation in the post-Soviet Russia, ISA decided to shift TAUVEX to a different satellite. In early-2004 ISA signed an agreement with the Indian Space Research Organisation (ISRO) to launch TAUVEX on board the Indian technology demonstrator satellite GSAT-4. The launch vehicle slated to be used was the GSLV with a new, cryogenic, upper stage. TAUVEX was a scientific collaboration between Tel Aviv University and the Indian Institute of Astrophysics in Bangalore. Its Principal Investigators were Noah Brosch at Tel Aviv University and Jayant Murthy at the Indian Institute of Astrophysics. Originally, TAUVEX was scheduled to be launched in 2008, but various delays caused the integration with GSAT-4 to take place only in November 2009 for a launch the following year. ISRO decided in January 2010 to remove TAUVEX from the satellite since the Indian-built cryogenic upper stage for GSLV was deemed under-powered to bring GSAT-4 to a geosynchronous orbit. GSAT-4 was subsequently lost in the 15 April 2010 launch failure of GSLV. On 13 March 2011 TAUVEX was returned to Israel and was stored at the Prime Contractor facility pending an ISA decision about its future. In 2012 ISA decided to terminate the TAUVEX project, against the recommendation of a committee it formed to consider its future that recommended its release for a high-altitude balloon flight.

== Instrumentation ==
TAUVEX consists of three bore-sighted 20 cm diameter telescopes on a single bezel, called telescopes A, B, and C. Each telescope images the same sky area of 0.9 degree, with an angular resolution of 7-11 arcseconds. The imaging is onto position-sensitive detectors (CsTe cathodes on calcium fluoride windows) equipped with multi-channel plate electron intensifiers. The detectors oversample the point-spread-function by a factor of approximately three. The output is detected by position-sensitive anodes (wedge-and-strip) and is digitized to 12 bits. The full image of each telescope has about 300 resolution elements across its diameter.

The type of cathode (CsTe) assures sensitivity from longward of Lyman α to the atmospheric limit with a peak quantum efficiency of approximately 10%. The operating spectral range is separated in a number of segments selectable with filters. Each telescope [T] is equipped with a four-position filter wheel. Each wheel contains one blocked position (shutter) and three band-selection filters [Fn]. The filter complement, and its distribution among the three telescopes, is as follows:

T	F1	F2	F3	F4
A	BBF	SF1	SF2	Shutter
B	Shutter	SF1	NBF3	SF3
C	BBF	Shutter	SF2	SF3

The approximate characteristics of each filter type are summarized below:

Filter	Wavelength	Width	Normalized transmission
BBF	2300 Å (230 nm)	1000 Å (100 nm)	80%
SF1	1750 Å (175 nm)	400 Å (40 nm)	20%
SF2	2200 Å (200 nm)	400 Å (40 nm)	45%
SF3	2600 Å (260 nm)	500 Å (50 nm)	40%
NBF3	2200 Å (220 nm)	200 Å (20 nm)	30%

TAUVEX was mounted to the GSAT-4 spacecraft on a plate that could rotate around its axis (the MDP), enabling to point the telescopes' line-of-sight to any desired declination. Being on a geostationary satellite, the observation would therefore have been of a scanning type. A 'ribbon' of a constant declination, 0.9 degree wide, would have been scanned as time advanced, completing an entire 360 degree circuit during one sidereal day. In this mode of operation, the dwell time of a source within the detector field of view is a function of the pointing declination and of the exact location in the FOV relative to the detector diameter. The closer a source is to one of the celestial poles, the longer it resides in the TAUVEX field of view during a single scan. The longest theoretically possible exposure is for sources at |δ|>89°30'; these could be observed all day.

The interface with GSAT-4 ensured that each photon event hitting the detectors would have been transmitted to the ground in real time and processed in a near-real-time pipeline. In-between the photon events a time tag is added every 128 ms. The time between the adjacent time tags is sufficiently short so that the orbital motion of the nadir-pointing platform is much smaller than the TAUVEX virtual pixel.

Given that TAUVEX on GSAT-4 was planned to operate from a geo-synchronous platform that is, essentially, a telecommunications satellite, it is clear that up and downlink telemetry are much less problematic that with other astronomical satellites. In fact, TAUVEX was allowed a dedicated 1 Mbit/s downlink to the ISRO Master Control Facility (MCF) at Hassan, near Bangalore. Command sequences were planned to be uplinked after being generated by IIA and ISRO and the downlink to be analyzed on-line to monitor the payload state of health.

In most situations, TAUVEX would have been able to download all the detected photon events. However, in case of strong straylight or of many bright sources in the field of view, the collected event rate could overload the capacity of the telemetry link. In this case, TAUVEX would have stored the photon events in a solid state memory module (4 GB), from which the events are transmitted at the nominal 1 Mbit/s rate.

== Science with TAUVEX ==
The science of TAUVEX is based on its unique characteristics: three bore-sighted and independent telescopes able to operate independently, with different filters but measuring the same sources, and reasonably fine time resolution as every detected photon is time-tagged. A unique possibility allows the study of the interstellar dust band at 217.4 nm; the two TAUVEX filters SF2 and NBF3 are centered on this wavelength but have different widths. As the filters are located on different telescopes, it is possible to measure the same sky region with both filters simultaneously, deriving the equivalent width of the band for every star in the field of view. The use of TAUVEX as a scientific instrument is the result of calibration on the ground. This calibration was very difficult and produced unreliable results possibly indicating a significantly reduced performance. Given the uncertain results, the Principal Investigators planned to repeat and improve the calibration in space, in the months following the launch.

== See also ==
- Spektr-RG
