= Dan Blumberg =

Israeli geographer

- דן בלומברג
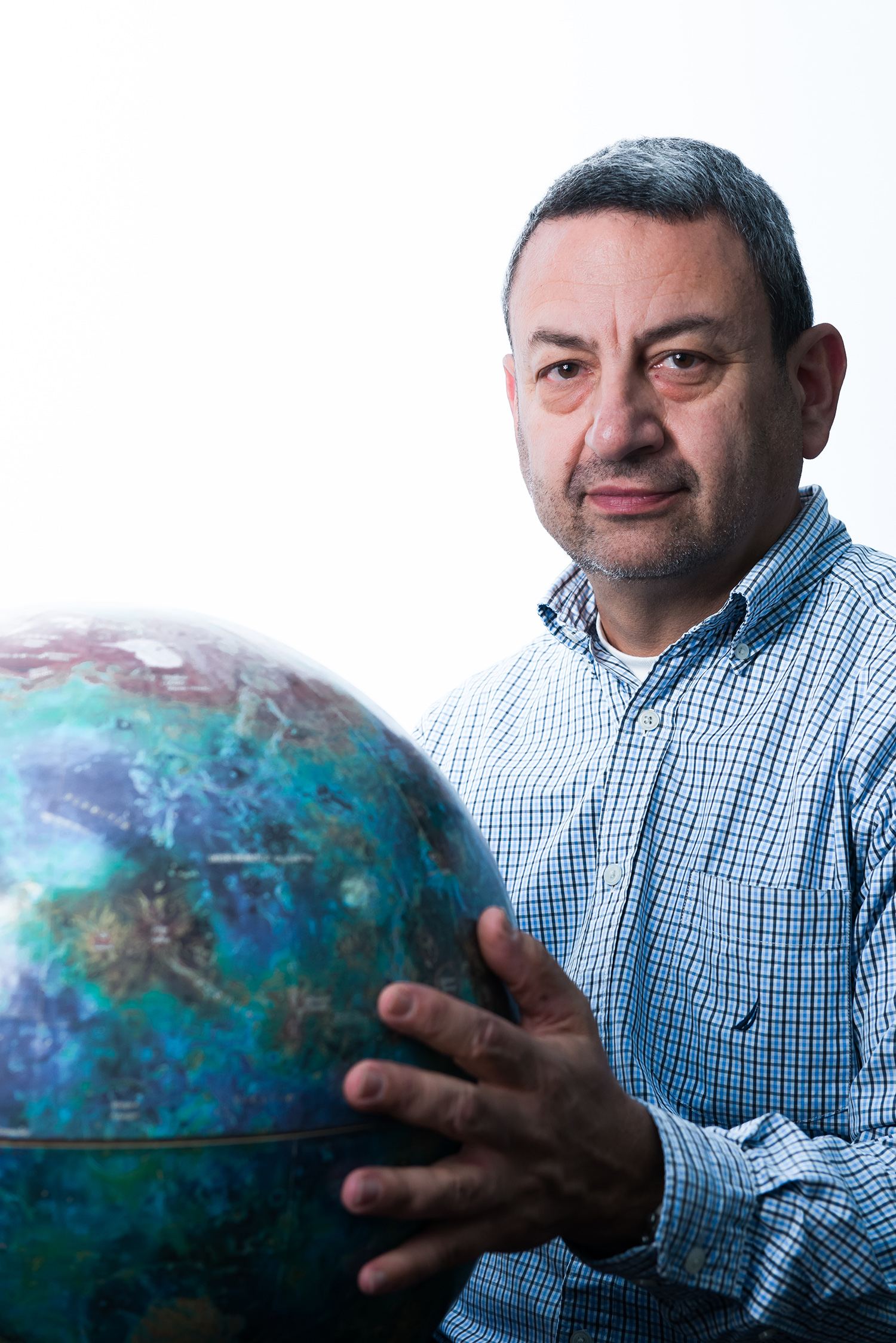
- Scientific career
- Fields: Space and Planetary Sciences and Geography
- Workplaces: Ben-Gurion University of the Negev
- Doctoral advisors: Ronald Greeley and Anthony Brazel
- Website: https://www.blumberg.bgu.ac.il/

Dan G. Blumberg (Hebrew: דן בלומברג) is a professor at Ben-Gurion University of the Negev in the Department of Geography and Environmental Development. He currently serves as vice president for Regional and Industrial Development after serving as vice president and dean for Research and Development from 2014 to 2019. Blumberg also serves as director of the Homeland Security Institute. He is the head of the Earth and Planetary Image Facility, a remote sensing research laboratory.

In 2016 Blumberg was elected as a member of the International Academy of Astronautics.

Blumberg also led the successful BGUSat mission, a 3U cubesat mission built in collaboration with the Israel Aerospace Industry and launched successfully February 2017.

Blumberg has been one of the most influential people leading the Beer-Sheva Digital and Cyber ecosystem development.

He is one of the leading academic figures in Israel and during July 2019 visited South Korea as part of an academic and economic delegation led by Israel President Reuven (Ruvi) Rivlin.

Blumberg has been appointed by the Minister of Innovation Science and Technology and the Government of Israel as chairperson of the Israeli Space Agency, replacing Isaac Ben-Israel in July 2022.

== Education ==
Blumberg earned a Ph.D. from Arizona State University in 1993, where he studied and worked in the Planetary Geology Group, a NASA sponsored research group, where he focused on studying aeolian processes (wind-blown sand transport and deposition) on Earth, Mars, and Venus comparatively and the use of microwave radar remote sensing to image terrestrial surfaces. The title of His Ph.D. thesis was "Prediction of Aeolian Processes using Radar Remote Sensing and Numerical Models". In his thesis he used AIRSAR data in preparation for NASA's upcoming Spaceborne Radar Laboratory Missions (SRL-1 and 2) to study geological morphologies. Blumberg's Ph.D. Advisors were Ronald Greeley and Anthony Brazel and on his committee served Phil Christensen and Mel Marcus. Blumberg continued to do a postdoctoral term in the group working on the shuttle radar missions and became an Associate Research Faculty member at Arizona State University in the Geological Sciences department.

== Career ==
Blumberg joined BGU in late 1995 as a lecturer in the Department of Geography and Environmental Development. He developed the field of remote sensing within the Department of Geography and Environmental Development and has been a key player together with scientists from the Faculty of Engineering and The Blaustein Institutes for Desert Research in turning BGU into a world-renowned research institute in the field.

He has gone on to be one of the leading scientists in Aeolian research with a strong focus on the use of remote sensing to map windblown and windswept terrains.

In 2004 Blumberg was promoted to Associate Professor. Between 2006 and 2010 he served as Chair of the Department of Geography and Environmental Development before being appointed to Deputy VP and Dean for research and development. In 2008 Blumberg was promoted to the level of full Professor. In 2014 Blumberg was appointed Vice President for Research of Ben-Gurion University of the Negev. Negev and in 2019 as Vice President for regional and industrial development. Since 2016, Prof. Blumberg is taking part on the advisory board of Utilis, a satellite-based leak detection company and Planet Watchers a satellite technology based company for environmental monitoring.

== Research and students ==
Blumberg has published numerous scientific papers and has supervised more than 30 Ph.D. and master's degree students. His research spans a wide arena of remote sensing applications. His primary scientific research interest has been in Planetary geology with a focus on aeolian bedforms and the use of remote sensing to study arid zone environments but in the process has also impacted upon other applications such homeland security, rapid response, target and anomaly detection and situational awareness. Within these studies Blumberg has been developing novel methods to analyze multi dimensional image cubes including polarimetric synthetic aperture radar and hyperspectral data. Blumberg was a Co-Investigator on the SRL (SIR-C mission) through Prof. Ronald Greeley of Arizona State University who was a PI on the mission. Blumberg has served as a principal investigator on many research projects for the Israel Space Agency, on the TerraSar-x mission of the German Space Agency and more. In his research he has combined field studies with the use of space and airborne images. Blumberg has always promoted the philosophy that understanding satellite images requires scientists to have a strong field background. In his own research he has conducted field work in the North American Deserts, the Central Asian Deserts and in the Middle East. Blumberg has also promoted the involvement of students in community outreach as a way to spread scientific knowledge gathered within academia and increase equal opportunity to reach academic education.
