= Slosh dynamics =

Movement of liquid inside another moving object

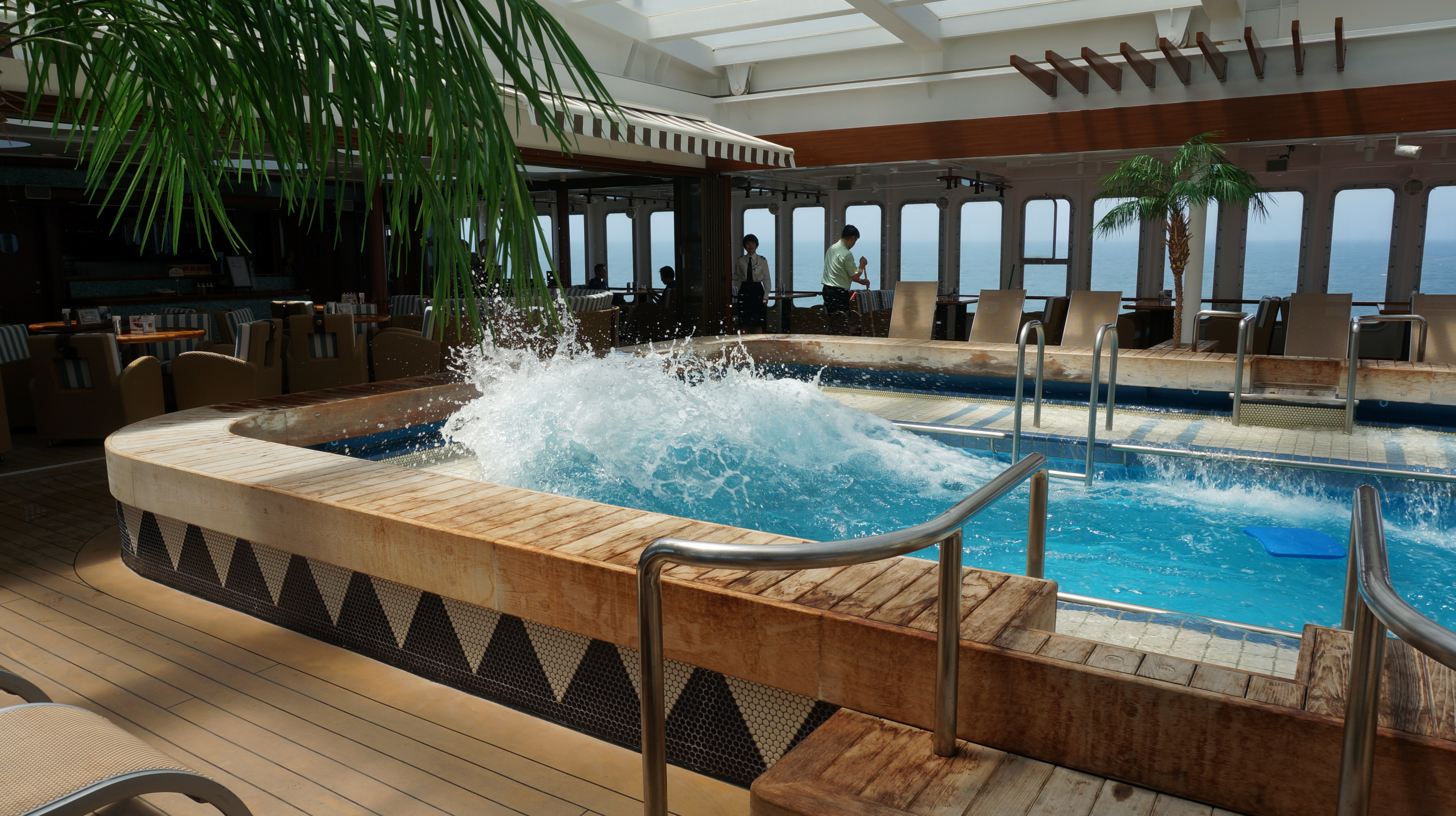
Water sloshing in the swimming pool of a cruise ship undergoing pitching motion

In fluid dynamics, slosh refers to the movement of liquid inside another object (which is, typically, also undergoing motion).

Strictly speaking, the liquid must have a free surface to constitute a slosh dynamics problem, where the dynamics of the liquid can interact with the container to alter the system dynamics significantly. Important examples include propellant slosh in spacecraft tanks and rockets (especially upper stages), and the free surface effect (cargo slosh) in ships and trucks transporting liquids (for example oil and gasoline). However, it has become common to refer to liquid motion in a completely filled tank, i.e. without a free surface, as "fuel slosh".

Such motion is characterized by "inertial waves" and can be an important effect in spinning spacecraft dynamics. Extensive mathematical and empirical relationships have been derived to describe liquid slosh. These types of analyses are typically undertaken using computational fluid dynamics and finite element methods to solve the fluid-structure interaction problem, especially if the solid container is flexible. Relevant fluid dynamics non-dimensional parameters include the Bond number, the Weber number, and the Reynolds number.

Water sloshing in a glass cup

Slosh is an important effect for spacecraft, ships, some land vehicles and some aircraft. Slosh was a factor in the Falcon 1 second test flight anomaly, and has been implicated in various other spacecraft anomalies, including a near-disaster with the Near Earth Asteroid Rendezvous (NEAR Shoemaker) satellite.

== Spacecraft effects ==
Liquid slosh in microgravity is relevant to spacecraft, most commonly Earth-orbiting satellites, and must take account of liquid surface tension which can alter the shape (and thus the eigenvalues) of the liquid slug. Typically, a large fraction of the mass of a satellite is liquid propellant at/near Beginning of Life (BOL), and slosh can adversely affect satellite performance in a number of ways. For example, propellant slosh can introduce uncertainty in spacecraft attitude (pointing) which is often called jitter. Similar phenomena can cause pogo oscillation and can result in structural failure of a space vehicle.

Another example is problematic interaction with the spacecraft's Attitude Control System (ACS), especially for spinning satellites which can suffer resonance between slosh and nutation, or adverse changes to the rotational inertia. Because of these types of risk, in the 1960s the National Aeronautics and Space Administration (NASA) extensively studied liquid slosh in spacecraft tanks, and in the 1990s NASA undertook the Middeck 0-Gravity Dynamics Experiment on the Space Shuttle. The European Space Agency has advanced these investigations with the launch of SLOSHSAT. Most spinning spacecraft since 1980 have been tested at the Applied Dynamics Laboratories drop tower using sub-scale models. Extensive contributions have also been made by the Southwest Research Institute, but research is widespread in academia and industry.

Research is continuing into slosh effects on in-space propellant depots. In October 2009, the United States Air Force and United Launch Alliance (ULA) performed an experimental on-orbit demonstration on a modified Centaur upper stage on the DMSP-18 satellite launch in order to improve "understanding of propellant settling and slosh", "The light weight of DMSP-18 allowed 12,000 pounds (5,400 kg) of remaining LO_{2} and LH_{2} propellant, 28% of Centaur’s capacity", for the on-orbit tests. The post-spacecraft mission extension ran 2.4 hours before the planned deorbit burn was executed.

NASA's Launch Services Program is working on two on-going slosh fluid dynamics experiments with partners: CRYOTE and SPHERES-Slosh. ULA has additional small-scale demonstrations of cryogenic fluid management are planned with project CRYOTE in 2012–2014 leading to a ULA large-scale cryo-sat propellant depot test under the NASA flagship technology demonstrations program in 2015. SPHERES-Slosh with Florida Institute of Technology and Massachusetts Institute of Technology will examine how liquids move around inside containers in microgravity with the SPHERES Testbed on the International Space Station.

== Sloshing in road tank vehicles ==
Liquid sloshing strongly influences the directional dynamics and safety performance of highway tank vehicles in a highly adverse manner. Hydrodynamic forces and moments arising from liquid cargo oscillations in the tank under steering and/or braking maneuvers reduce the stability limit and controllability of partially-filled tank vehicles. Anti-slosh devices such as baffles are widely used in order to limit the adverse liquid slosh effect on directional performance and stability of the tank vehicles to prevent load movement destabilizing the vehicle known as the "Wave effect". Since most of the time, tankers are carrying dangerous liquid contents such as ammonia, gasoline and fuel oils, stability of partially-filled liquid cargo vehicles is very important. Optimizations and sloshing reduction techniques in fuel tanks such as elliptical tank, rectangular, modified oval and generic tank shape have been performed in different filling levels using numerical, analytical and analogical analyses. Most of these studies concentrate on effects of baffles on sloshing while the influence of cross-section is completely ignored.

The Bloodhound LSR 1,000 mph project car utilizes a liquid-fuelled rocket that requires a specially-baffled oxidizer tank to prevent directional instability, rocket thrust variations and even oxidizer tank damage.

== Practical effects ==
Sloshing or shifting cargo, water ballast, or other liquid (e.g., from leaks or fire fighting) can cause disastrous capsizing in ships due to free surface effect; this can also affect trucks and aircraft.

The effect of slosh is used to limit the bounce of a roller hockey ball. Water slosh can significantly reduce the rebound height of a ball but some amounts of liquid seem to lead to a resonance effect. Many of the balls for roller hockey commonly available contain water to reduce the bounce height.

== See also ==
- Seiche, a phenomenon affecting lakes and other constrained bodies of water
- Splash (fluid mechanics), other free surface phenomena
- Succussion splash, audible medical sign
