= OPTSAT-3000 =

Italian Earth-observation and reconnaissance satellite

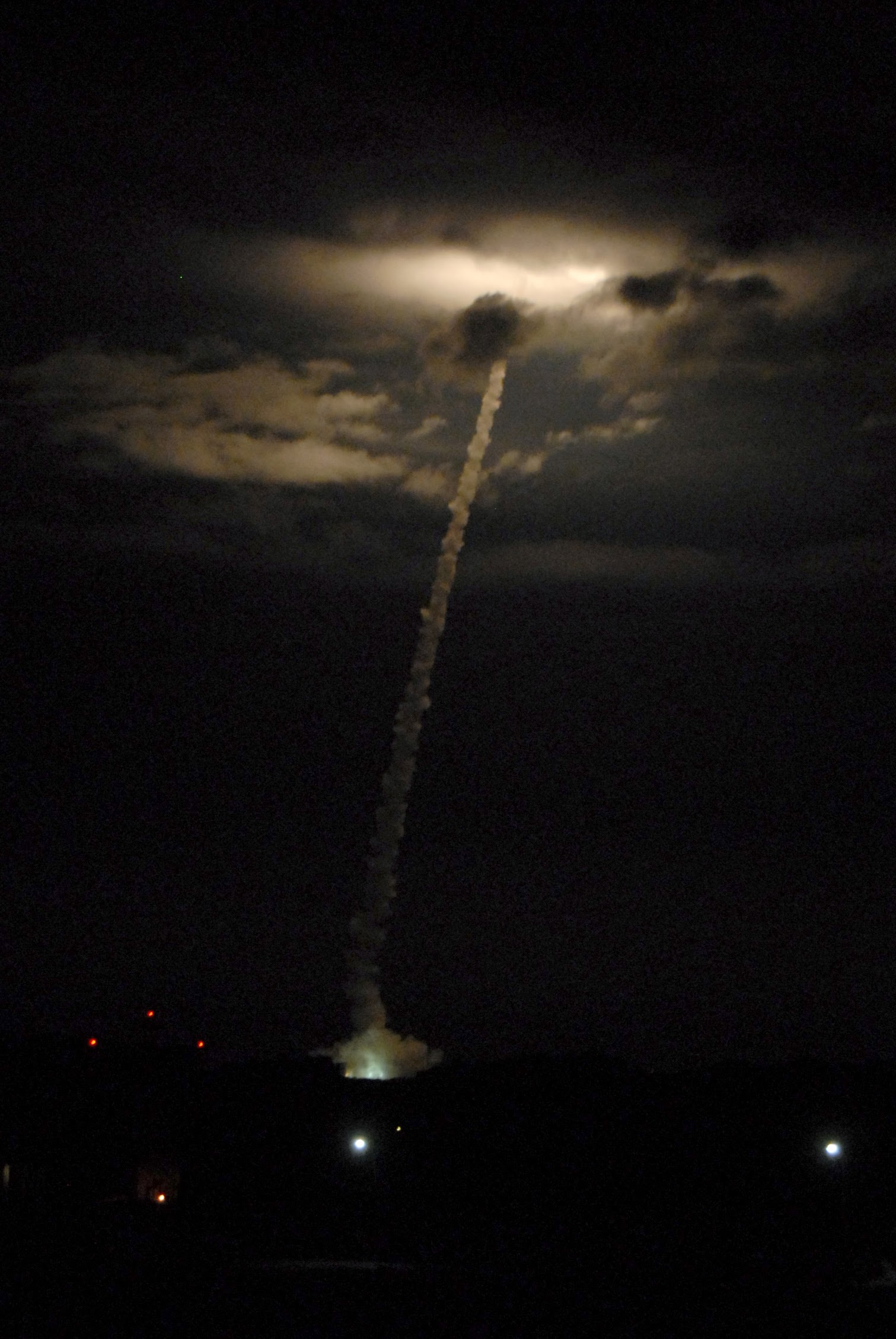
- Launch of OPTSAT-3000 on board Vega flight VV10
- Names: SHALOM
- Mission type: Reconnaissance
- Operator: Ministry of Defence
- COSPAR ID: 2017-044A
- SATCAT no.: 42900
- Website: OPTSAT-3000
- Mission duration: >7 years (planned); 9 years, 4 months and 2 days (elapsed)

Spacecraft properties
- Bus: TecSAR
- Manufacturer: Israel Aerospace Industries
- Launch mass: 368 kg (811 lb)
- Dimensions: 4.58 × 3.35 × 1.20 m (15.0 × 11.0 × 3.9 ft) (incl. solar arrays)

Start of mission
- Launch date: August 2, 2017
- Rocket: Vega
- Launch site: Guiana Space Centre ELA-1
- Contractor: Arianespace

Orbital parameters
- Reference system: Geocentric
- Regime: Sun-synchronous
- Semi-major axis: 6,858 km (4,261 mi)
- Periapsis altitude: 474.1 km (294.6 mi)
- Apoapsis altitude: 501.8 km (311.8 mi)
- Inclination: 97.2°
- Period: 94.2 minutes

OPTSAT-3000 (OPTical SATellite-3000) is an Italian Earth observation and reconnaissance satellite developed and built by Israel Aerospace Industries and operated by the Italian Ministry of Defence. Launched on August 2, 2017, it has an expected service life of at least 7 years. It is based on the design of the TecSAR-1 satellite.

== Design ==
=== Satellite bus ===
OPTSAT-3000 is based upon the bus of the Israeli reconnaissance satellite TecSAR-1, but is modified for optical instruments. It has a launch mass of 368 kg (811 lb) and dimensions of 4.58 × 3.35 × 1.20 m (15.0 × 11.0 × 3.9 ft) when its two solar arrays are deployed.

=== Imaging system ===
OPTSAT-3000 has a high-resolution optical imaging system known as Jupiter, which is able to deliver panchromatic images with a resolution of 0.5 m (1 ft 8 in) while operating the multispectral channel at the same time. These imaging detectors, combined with a 70 cm (28 in) telescope from an altitude of almost 600 km (370 mi), allows OPTSAT-3000 to cover a ground track 15 km (9.3 mi) wide.

== Launch ==
OPTSAT-3000 launched from Guiana Space Centre ELV, French Guiana, on board a Vega rocket. It was launched to a Sun-synchronous low Earth orbit with an apoapsis of 501.8 km (311.8 mi), a periapsis of 474.1 km (294.6 mi) and an inclination of 97.2°, allowing it to cover much of the world.

== See also ==
- VENμS
