= Time delay and integration =

Type of image sensor

A time delay and integration or time delay integration (TDI) is a forward motion compensation (FMC) technique for capturing images of moving objects at low light levels. It's a type of line scanning where multiple linear arrays are placed side by side. After the first array is exposed, the charge is transferred to the neighboring line. When the object moves the distance of the separation between lines, a second exposure is taken on top of the first with the next array, and so on. Thus, each line of the object is imaged repeatedly, and the exposures are added to each other. This works by synchronized mechanical and electronic scanning, so that the effects of dim imaging targets on the sensor can be integrated over longer periods of time.

TDI is more of an operating mode of an image sensor than a separate type of imaging device altogether, even if technical optimizations for the mode are also available. The most used way to perform TDI is called dTDI from digital time delay integration, which is software-based and independent of the type of underlying imaging sensor. The principle behind TDI—constructive interference between separate observations—is often applicable to other sensor technologies, so that it is comparable to any long-term integrating mode of imaging, such as speckle imaging, adaptive optics, and especially long exposure astronomical observation.

== Detailed operation ==
It is perhaps the easiest to understand TDI devices by contrast with more well-known types of CCD sensors. The best known is the staring array. In it, there are hundreds or thousands of adjacent rows of specially engineered semiconductor that react to light by accumulating charge, and slightly separated in depth from it by insulation, a tightly spaced array of gate electrodes, whose electric field can be used to drive the accumulated charge around in a predictable and almost lossless fashion. In a staring array configuration, the image is exposed on the two-dimensional semiconductor surface, and then the resulting charge distribution over each line of the image is moved to the side, to be rapidly and sequentially read out by an electronic read amplifier. When done fast enough, this produces a snapshot of the applied photonic flux over the sensor; the readout can proceed in parallel over the several lines, and yields a two-dimensional image of the light applied. Along with CMOS detectors which sense the photocharge accumulation pixel by pixel instead of moving the charge out line by line, such sensors are commonly known as parts of digital cameras, from the small to the large.

A scanning array on the other hand involves just one such CCD line, or at most a couple of them. Its principle of operation is to rely on mechanical scanning, so that a single linear CCD element gets exposed to different parts of the object to be imaged, sequentially. Then the whole image is assembled from equally spaced lines through the field of view. Typical examples of this scanning mode are fax machines and other document scanners, where the imaging target is fed through at a constant linear velocity, and satellite sensing, where the constant orbital velocity of a satellite naturally exposes line after another of the underlying terrain to the transversely positioned sensor.

The advantage of using a CCD sensor this way is reduced complexity, and so price, or vice versa the possibility of utilizing much more refined and so more expensive CCD technology for the single line sensor array, for higher fidelity. CCDs can also be manufactured in configurations that are tolerant to the wide fluctuations in radiation and temperature, characteristic of space environments, and scanning ones can be made extra robust by the inclusion of multiple lines. Since the out-clocking mechanism of a well-phased CCD line is a continuous process, not divided into pixels, the eventual line-wise resolution of the image can also exceed the resolution of the gating infrastructure, leading to higher resolution than a pixel-based sensor. CCDs are also easier to make for cryogenic temperatures, such as are needed e.g. for far-infrared astronomy.

=== Motion ===
At the same time, the continuous operation and slow, line-discrete readout also leads to a problem: if anything moves within the scene to be imaged, there will be blurring and tearing between lines. Wherever some accumulated packet of charge within a CCD line is moving on the sensor chip, any extra light shone upon it will lead to more charge, even if it comes from a wrong direction, or a newer moment of acquisition than intended. It will register just the same, so that it integrates over time to whatever will eventually be read out. This leads to what is in cinematography called motion blur, and since the readout of the multiple lines of the typical CCD array occurs at different successive times, it also causes screen tearing.

In TDI mode, motion blur and the pseudo-analogue nature of CCDs is turned from a fault into a special-purpose asset. The line or 2D array is turned 90 degrees so that the lines in the CCD sensor follow the expected trajectory of the object of interest in the field of view. Then, the readout speed from the sensor is adjusted so that the charge packets in the imaging plane track the object, accumulating charge over time. This is effectively the same as spinning the spacecraft or other platform to match the viewing angle towards an object; it yields time integration in the digital domain, instead of the physical one. Physical tracking and superimposition of images can be applied in addition, as more traditional forms of TDI.

With the high sensitivity of CCD sensors, into the photon counting regime, this can lead to extremely high detection and measurement sensitivity. Additionally, it is difficult to achieve the kinds of coherent measurement gains with digital technologies besides CCDs, because they suffer from more prominent aliasing.

== Technology specific to TDI CCD ==
While the basic theory of TDI only mentions single-row CCDs, specifically designed parts and algorithms utilize everything from a few lines to entire staring arrays, with integration taking place over multiple lines, in software, as well. A designated TDI CCD improves upon the single-line-scan system by adding up multiple measured photocharges over its more complicated sensor, and by more comprehensive analysis of the interaction between continuous lines and discrete column structure. This e.g. aids in integration over physical tracking errors, imperfect lensing, background rejection, and multi-object tracking.

CCD technology and as such TDI is also used in x-ray astronomy. There, a different set of challenges prevails: TDI is used because high energy photons tend to exhibit high imaging loss, and then when they are fortuitously recovered, one-by-one tend to wreak havoc with the imaging element. Here, CCDs are often used because they can be manufactured in radiation hardened configurations, and are rather tolerant of radiation even as-is. This is especially important in solutions using coherent addition, because they focus and track intense radiation sources for a span of time, so that the total irradiative dose from the source reaches high levels over time, per a given area.

== Applications ==
TDI CCD is especially used in scanning of moving objects, for example letter and film scanning, or from a moving platform, for example aerial reconnaissance.

- Astronomy
- Medical radiography
  - Angiography
  - Mammography
- Military imaging
  - High-altitude surveillance
  - Low-light-level observation

== See also ==
- Push broom scanner
