= Yehoshua Sagi =

Israeli politician (1933–2021)

- יהושע שגיא
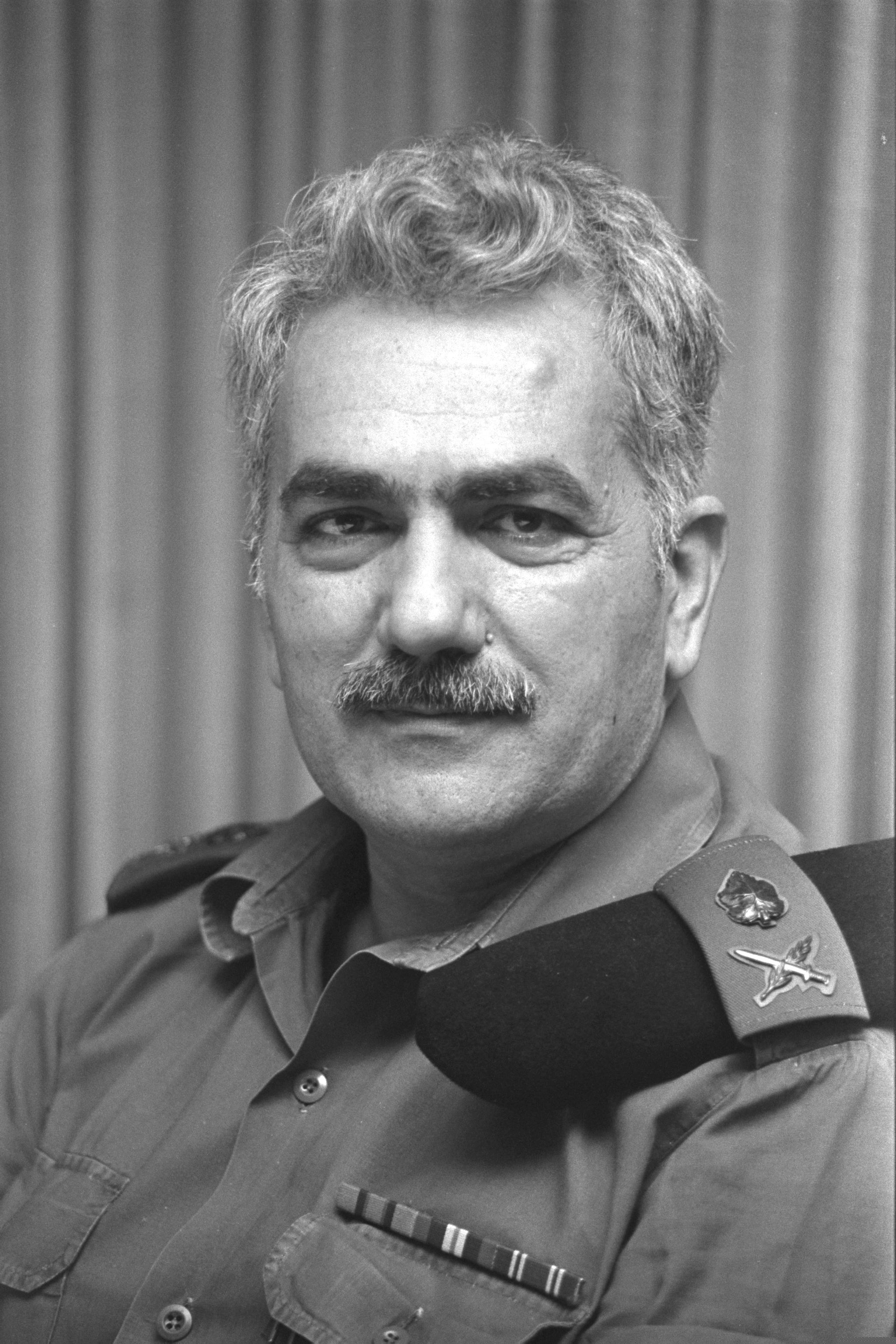

Faction represented in the Knesset
- 1988–1992: Likud

Personal details
- Born: 17 September 1933 Jerusalem, Mandatory Palestine
- Died: 18 February 2021 (aged 87)

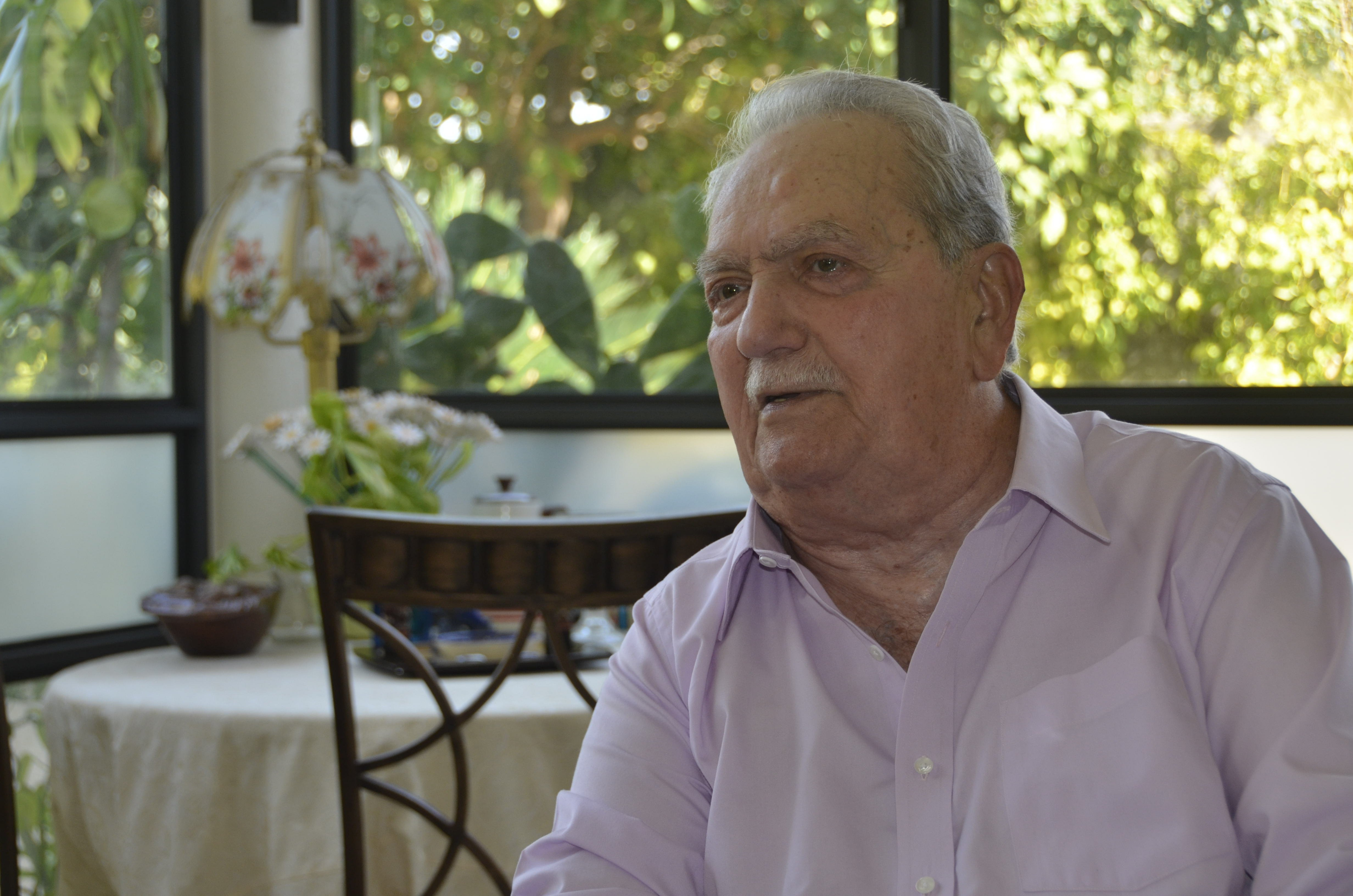
Yehoshua Sagi, 2018

Yehoshua Sagi (Hebrew: יהושע שגיא; 27 September 1933 – 18 February 2021) was an Israeli intelligence officer and politician. He was director of the Military Intelligence Directorate (1979–1983) a Knesset member for Likud (1988–1992) and mayor of the coastal city of Bat Yam.

== Biography ==
Yehoshua Sagi was born in Jerusalem during the Mandate era. He attended a high school in the Hebrew University Secondary School, and later earned a B.A. in history and international relations from Tel Aviv University.

== Military career ==
Sagi entered the Israeli Defense Forces in 1951. From 1953 to 1954, he served in the Southern Command, fulfilling field duties. During the Suez Crisis in 1956, he served as intelligence officer of the Armored Corps and as commander of a reconnaissance unit. Following the 1956 war, he served as an intelligence officer with the 7th Brigade, and later as assistant intelligence officer. From 1967 until 1970, he was an intelligence officer in the Southern Command, and during the Yom Kippur War was a divisional intelligence officer.

In 1974 he became assistant to the head of research at the Military Intelligence Directorate. After serving as deputy head beginning in 1978, he rose to become head of Military Intelligence in 1979.

Sagi opposed Operation Opera, the 1981 Israeli attack on the Iraqi Osirak nuclear reactor, saying "I do not believe fears of a 'Second Holocaust' justify the Israeli military taking any steps it thinks fit".

During the leadup to the 1982 Lebanon War, Sagi was charged by Prime Minister Menachem Begin with obtaining some form of American approval for an Israeli ground invasion of Lebanon. The result was the admission by U.S. Secretary of State Alexander Haig that the infiltration of terrorists over any of Israel's borders constituted a violation of the July 1981 ceasefire, but not terrorist actions against Israeli or Jewish targets outside of the region.

Sagi was asked to resign in 1983 following the recommendations of the Kahan Commission, which had determined that he was guilty of indifference during massacres at Palestinian refugee camps in Israeli-occupied Lebanon. Sagi subsequently resigned from the army.

== Political career ==
After leaving the IDF, he won a place on the Likud list for the 1988 elections, and won a seat in the Knesset. He served on the Finance Committee, the Foreign Affairs and Defense Committee and the Internal Affairs and Environment Committee, until losing his seat in the 1992 elections.

The following year, he became mayor of Bat Yam, a post he held until 2003.
