= GSAT-4 =

Indian experimental communication and navigation satellite

- GSAT-4
- Mission type: Communication
- Operator: ISRO
- Mission duration: 7 years (planned); Failed to orbit

Spacecraft properties
- Bus: I-2K
- Manufacturer: ISRO Satellite Centre; Space Applications Centre
- Launch mass: 2,220 kilograms (4,890 lb)
- Power: 2,760 watts

Start of mission
- Launch date: 15 April 2010, 10:57 UTC
- Rocket: GSLV Mk.II D3
- Launch site: Satish Dhawan SLP

Orbital parameters
- Reference system: Geocentric
- Regime: Geostationary
- Longitude: 82° East
- Epoch: Planned

Transponders
- Band: Ka-band

GSAT-4, also known as HealthSat, was an experimental communication and navigation satellite launched in April 2010 by the Indian Space Research Organisation on the maiden flight of the Geosynchronous Satellite Launch Vehicle Mk.II rocket. It failed to reach orbit after the rocket's third stage malfunctioned. The third stage was the first Indian-built cryogenic-fuelled upper stage, and was making its first flight. The ISRO suspects that the failure was caused by the third stage not igniting.

== Satellite ==
Weighing around two tons, GSAT-4 carried a multi-channel, Ka-band, bent pipe and regenerative transponder, and a navigation payload in the C, L1, and L5 bands. Designed to guide civil and military aircraft, GSAT-4 was to have employed several new technologies such as a bus management unit, miniaturised dynamically tuned gyros, lithium-ion battery, 70 volt bus for Ka-band travelling-wave tube amplifiers, and electric propulsion. GSAT-4 also incorporated technological experiments like on-board structural dynamic experiment, thermal control coating experiment and vibration beam accelerometer. With a lift-off mass of about 2,180 kilograms (4,810 lb), the spacecraft was to have generated a maximum of 2,760 W of power.

GSAT-4 was also to have been the first Indian spacecraft to employ ion propulsion. Four Hall-effect thrusters would have been used for north–south station keeping operations. Two types of Hall-effect thrusters are developed by ISRO Satellite Centre (ISAC) and Liquid Propulsion Systems Centre (LPSC).

=== Secondary payloads ===
GSAT-4 carried the first GPS Aided Geo Augmented Navigation, or GAGAN, navigation payload. GSAT-4 was also intended to carry to the Israeli TAUVEX-2 space telescope array. Due to concerns that the new upper stage may have reduced the rocket's payload capacity, ISRO decided to remove TAUVEX in order to decrease the mass of the payload. GAGAN was still flown. GAGAN consisted of a Ka band bent pipe transponder and a regenerative transponder.

== Launch ==
GSAT-4 was launched on the maiden flight of the GSLV Mk.II rocket, GSLV-D3, flying from the Second Launch Pad at the Satish Dhawan Space Centre. Its third stage was fitted with a new Indian-built cryogenic engine, which was intended to make the GSLV reliant on only Indian technology, since earlier launches had used Russian engines. GSLV-D3 was the sixth flight of the Geosynchronous Satellite Launch Vehicle across all variants.

The rocket was 40.39 metres (132.5 ft) in length minus its payload fairing, and consisted of a solid-fuelled S139 first stage augmented by four L40H hypergolically fuelled strapons, burning UDMH as fuel and N_{2}O_{4} as oxidiser. The second stage used the same hypergolic propellants, whilst the third stage was the new Cryogenic Upper Stage (CUS), burning liquid hydrogen oxidised by liquid oxygen.

The rocket's first and second stages performed normally, and at the time controllers reported that third stage ignition had occurred. However, shortly afterwards the rocket began to under-perform, tumbling out of control, and deviating from its planned trajectory. Around 300 seconds into the flight, contact with the rocket was lost. Initial analysis of the data suggested that the vernier thrusters, used to provide attitude control, had failed to ignite due to engineering problems. On 17 April, ISRO announced that further analysis of the data indicated that the third stage main engine had not ignited either. According to ISRO, the mission failed after the turbopump that supplied fuel to the cryogenic engine had stopped working one second after ignition.
