= Science and technology in Asia =

Science and technology in Asia is varied depending on the country and time. In the past, among Asian civilizations considered particularly notable for their contributions to science and technology were India, China and the West Asian civilizations. Countries such as Japan, South Korea, and Taiwan are recently known for technology, while China and India are also major contributors to science and technology. Other countries are also notable in other scientific fields such as chemical and physical achievements. For the science and technology of various Asian countries and civilizations, see:

== East Asia ==
- History of science and technology in China
  - Science and technology of the Han dynasty
  - Science and technology of the Song dynasty
  - Science and technology of the Tang dynasty
  - History of science and technology in the People's Republic of China
  - Science and technology in contemporary China
- Science and technology in Japan
  - History of science and technology in Japan
- Science and technology in South Korea
  - History of science and technology in Korea

== South Asia ==
- History of science and technology in the Indian subcontinent
  - Science and technology in India
  - Science and technology in Bangladesh
  - Science and technology in Pakistan

== Middle East ==
- Timeline of science and engineering in the Muslim world
  - Science in the medieval Islamic world
  - Arab Agricultural Revolution
  - List of inventions in the medieval Islamic world
  - Science and technology in the Ottoman Empire
  - Science and technology in Turkey
  - Science and technology in Iran
- Science and technology in Israel

== South-east Asia ==
- Science and technology in Malaysia
- Science and technology in the Philippines

== North Asia ==
- Science and technology in Russia

== See also ==
- Science and technology in Africa
- Science and technology in Europe
