= Netherlands Agency for Aerospace Programmes =

Organization

- Nederlands Instituut voor Vliegtuigontwikkeling en Ruimtevaart (NIVR)

Agency overview
- (etc.)
- Dissolved: 1 July 2009
- Superseding agency: Netherlands Space Office
- Type: Aircraft development & Space exploration
- Jurisdiction: Kingdom of the Netherlands
- Headquarters: The Netherlands
- Minister responsible: (etc.)
- Agency executive: (etc.)
- Child agencies: (etc.)
- Website: nivr.nl

The Netherlands Agency for Aerospace Programmes (in Dutch language, Nederlands Instituut voor Vliegtuigontwikkeling en Ruimtevaart (NIVR)) was the official space exploration agency of the Dutch government until 2009.

Since 1 July 2009, the space-exploration activities of the NIVR are merged into the newly formed Netherlands Space Office (NSO).

== See also ==
- European Space Agency (ESA)
- Netherlands Space Office (NSO)
