= Vandenberg Launch Complex 576E =

Launch Complex at Vandenberg Space Force Base

Launch Complex 576E
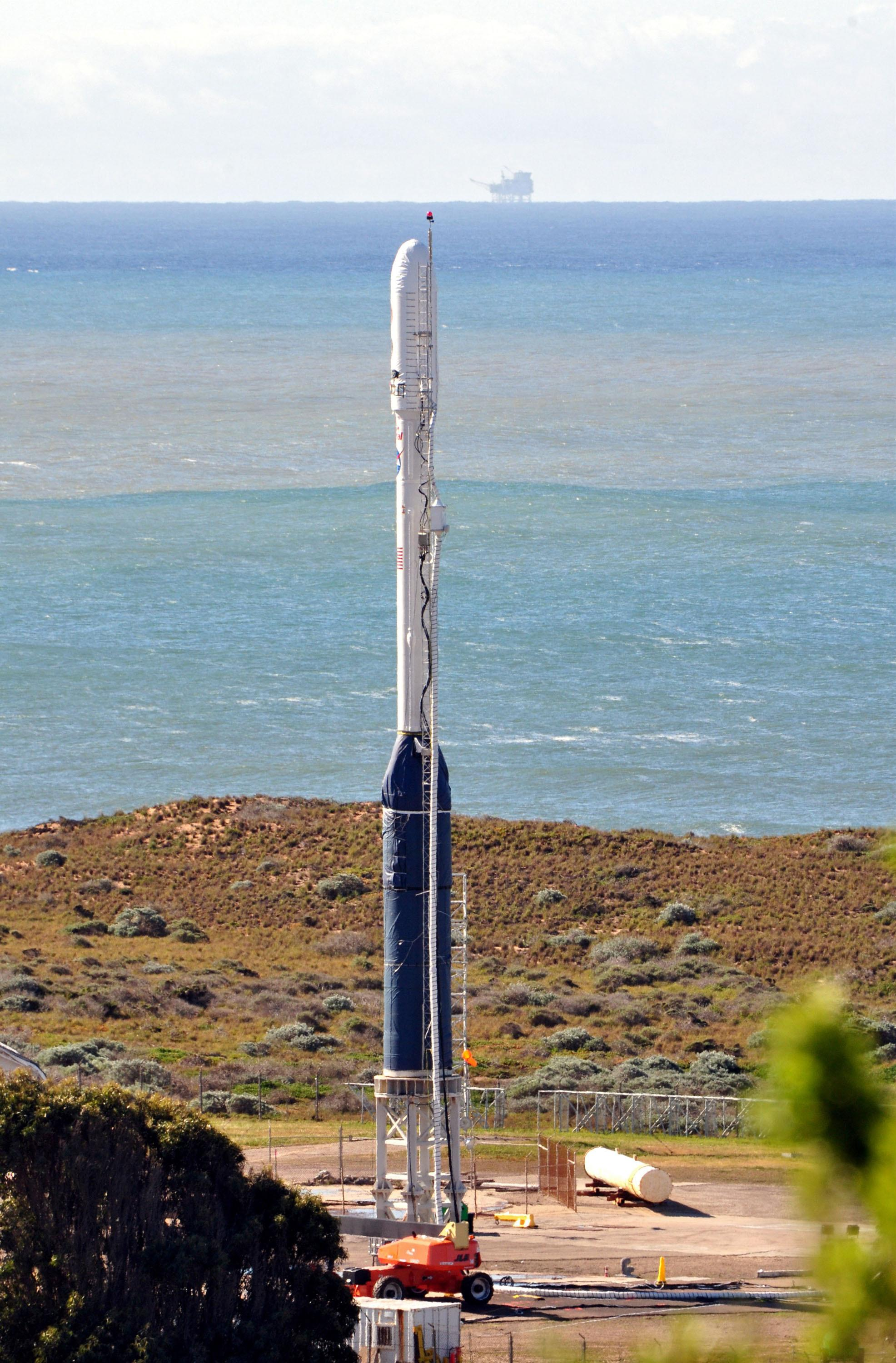
- LC-576E in 2011, with a Taurus carrying Glory on the pad.
- Interactive map of Launch Complex 576E
- Launch site: Vandenberg Space Force Base
- Location: 34°44′22″N 120°37′09″W
- Time zone: UTC−08:00 (PST)
  - Summer (DST): UTC−07:00 (PDT)
- Short name: LC-576E
- Operator: United States Space Force (owner); Northrop Grumman (tenant)
- Launch pad: 1
- Orbital inclination range: 55–145°
Launch history
- Status: Active
- Launches: 15
- First launch: 1 August 1962; SM-65F Atlas
- Last launch: 31 October 2017; Minotaur-C (SkySat x 6, Flock-3m x 4)
- Associated rockets: Current: Minotaur-C; Retired: Atlas F; Plans cancelled: RS1

Launch sites at Vandenberg Space Force Base
Active pads
Active pads not used for launches
Inactive leased pads
Inactive unleased pads
1 SLC-1E
2 SLC-1W
3 SLC-2E
4 SLC-2W
5 SLC-10E
6 SLC-10W
7 LC-576E
8 SLC-9
9 SLC-3E
10 SLC-3W
11 SLC-4E
12 SLC-4W (LZ-4)
13 SLC-5
14 SLC-6
15 SLC-8
16 SLC-7
17 SLC-11
18 SLC-12
19 SLC-14
20 SLC-15

Launch Complex 576E (LC-576E or SLC-576E) is a launch pad located at Vandenberg Space Force Base near Lompoc, California. Part of the ABRES series of launch complexes, the pad was originally designed and built for the launching and testing of SM-65 Atlas ICBMs as part of the Western Range, and now serves as an orbital launch site for the Minotaur-C launch vehicles.

== History ==
LC-576E was originally constructed by the United States Air Force in the late 1950s as part of the Complex ABRES series of launch pads, to be used in the testing of the SM-65F Atlas for the Strategic Air Command. The maiden launch from the complex was performed on August 1, 1962, and further seeing three additional Atlas launches over the next two years. This era swiftly came to an end however with the retirement of the Atlas as a missile in 1965, following the wake of replacements like the LGM-25C Titan II and the LGM-30 Minuteman being introduced. Additionally, with orbital Atlas rockets from Vandenberg already being launched from SLC-3 and SLC-4, the necessity of ABRES was no longer required and the complex was deactivated.

For the following 30 years, LC-576E was mothballed and no launches would come from the site. However, winds would change in the early 1990s when the Air Force reactivated the site for Orbital Sciences Corporation's Taurus launch vehicle, following their earlier success with the air-launched Pegasus. The new era for LC-576E kicked off with its first orbital launch on March 13, 1994, lifting off a Taurus carrying TAOS for the Air Force and a satellite for ARPA. Three more Taurus launches from the site were made throughout the rest of the 1990s, carrying payloads for customers such as the United States Navy, the National Reconnaissance Office, and commercial customers like Orbcomm. The 2000s would prove to be a less welcoming period for Orbital and the pad, with three of the following five launches from LC-576E ending as failures, most notably with the 2009 launch of NASA's Orbiting Carbon Observatory and the 2011 launch of their Glory satellite. Also of note was a test launch of Orbital's Ground Based Interceptor from the site in 2003, which utilized Taurus's three upper stages as an anti-ballistic missile. Since 2011, the only launch made from LC-576E was on October 31, 2017, with Orbital ATK's (following Orbital's 2015 merger with Alliant Techsystems) rechristening of the Taurus as the Minotaur-C. As of the current moment, the pad is still listed as active for use by Minotaur-C, now tenanted by Northrop Grumman following their acquisition of Orbital ATK in 2018.

In the late 2010s, ABL Space Systems announced that they would be using LC-576E alongside Northrop Grumman for the launching of their RS1 rocket, later complimenting launch sites leased at the Pacific Spaceport Complex, LC-15 at Cape Canaveral Space Force Station, and SaxaVord Spaceport in the United Kingdom. However, following a failed launch and a preclusion of the RS1 at Kodiak, ABL announced in October 2024 that they would be shifting their operations towards military applications. The next year, they rebranded themselves as Long Wall and transformed the RS1 into the RSX, though it remains in question if the rocket will see life from LC-576E.

== Launch history ==
=== Statistics ===
- Atlas F
- Taurus/Minotaur-C
- GBI

=== List of launches ===
All launches from 1962 to 1964 operated by the United States Air Force. All launches from 1994 to 2011 operated by Orbital Sciences Corporation. All launches in 2017 operated by Orbital ATK.

No.	Date	Time (UTC)	Launch vehicle	Configuration	Payload	Result	Remarks
1	1 August 1962	21:07	SM-65 Atlas	Atlas F	Suborbital test	Success	Maiden flight of the Atlas F, and first launch from LC-576E.
2	24 March 1963	00:29	SM-65 Atlas	Atlas F	Suborbital test	Failure	Failure caused by first stage malfunction.
3	7 August 1964	20:12	SM-65 Atlas	Atlas F	Suborbital test	Success	
4	22 December 1964	19:15	SM-65 Atlas	Atlas F	Suborbital test	Success	
5	13 March 1994	22:32	Taurus	ARPA Config.	TAOS	Success	Maiden flight of the Taurus. First orbital launch from LC-576E.
6	10 February 1998	13:20	Taurus	Com. Config.	GFO and Orbcomm 11/12	Success	
7	3 October 1998	10:04	Taurus	USAF Config.	NROL-8	Success	Launch for the National Reconnaissance Office. Technology demonstration satellite, also known as STEX.
8	21 December 1999	07:13	Taurus	Model 2110	KOMPSAT and ACRIMSAT	Success	
9	12 March 2000	09:29	Taurus	USAF Config.	MTI	Success	
10	21 September 2001	18:49	Taurus	Model 2110	Orbview-4/QuikTOMS	Failure	Flew off course following first stage separation. Although it recovered, it failed to reach a stable orbit.
11	6 February 2003	21:00	GBI	GBI Config.	Suborbital test	Success	Test launch of a missile interceptor based on Taurus hardware. Apogee of 1,810 km (1,120 mi).
12	20 May 2004	17:47	Taurus	Model 3210	ROCSAT-2	Success	
13	24 February 2009	09:55	Taurus	Model 3110	Orbiting Carbon Observatory	Failure	Satellite aimed at measuring carbon dioxide composition in Earth's atmosphere. Payload fairing failed to separate, with the added weight causing failure to reach orbit.
14	4 March 2011	10:09	Taurus	Model 3110	Glory	Failure	Satellite aimed at measuring aerosols such as sulfates in Earth's atmosphere. Payload fairing failed to separate, with the added weight causing failure to reach orbit.
15	31 October 2017	21:37	Minotaur-C	Model 3210	SkySat × 6, Flock-3m × 4	Success	First launch following the renaming of Taurus to Minotaur-C. Only LC-576E launch operated by Orbital ATK.

== Gallery ==
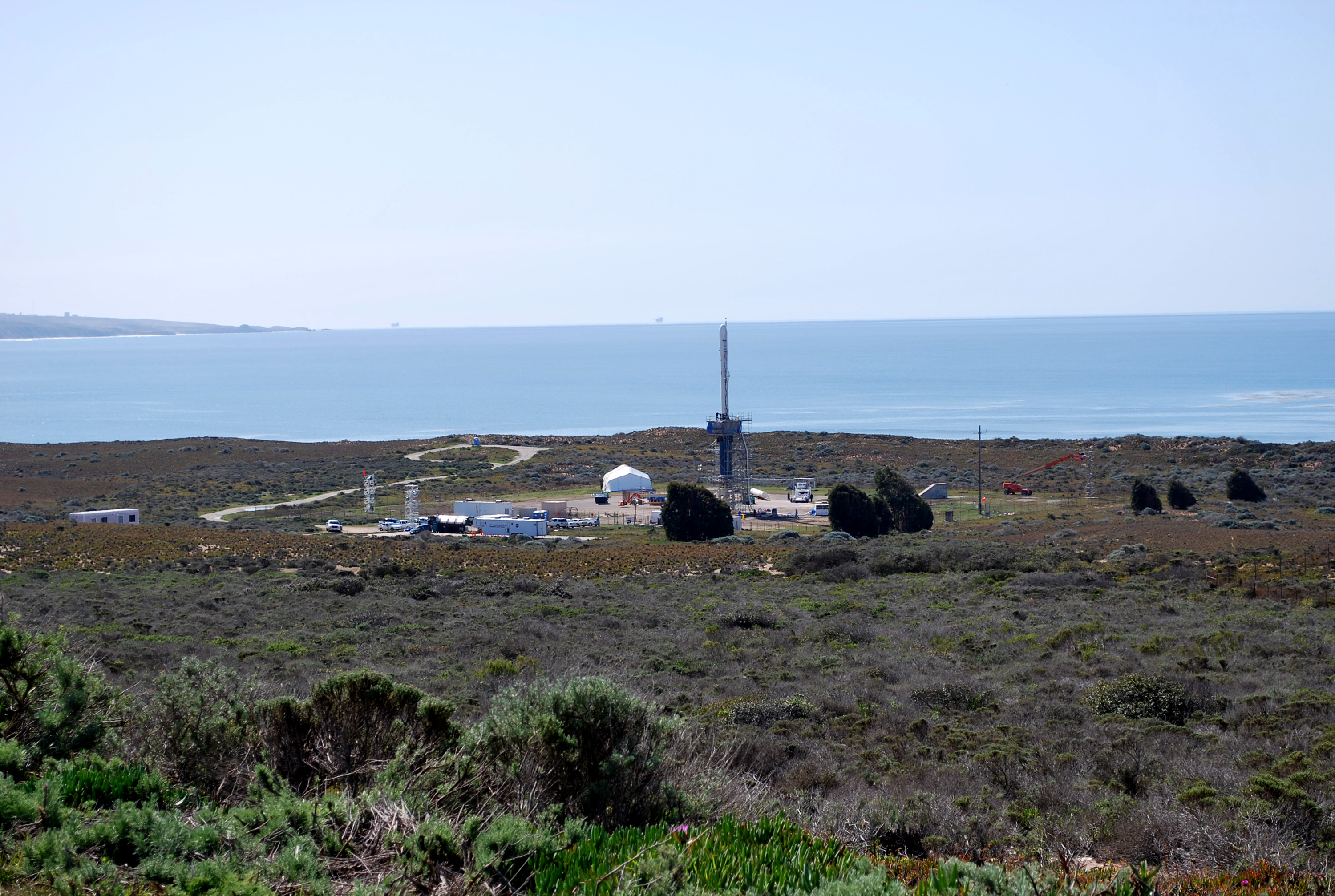
A long-range shot of LC-576E with a Taurus on the pad, carrying the Orbiting Carbon Observatory.

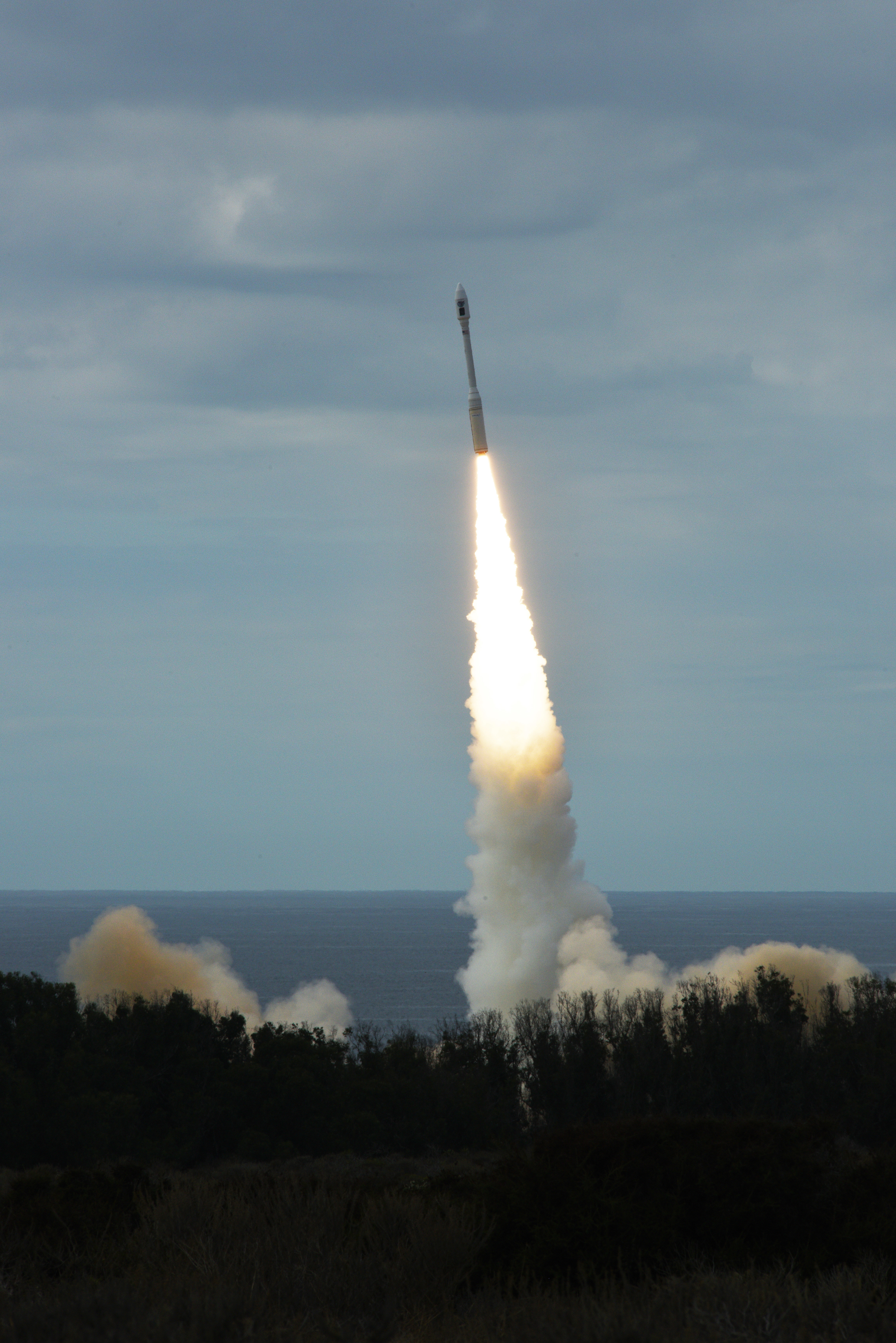
LC-576E in 2017, during a Minotaur-C launch
