= Multispectral Thermal Imager =

American Earth observation satellite

- Operator: (United States) NNSA
- COSPAR ID: 2000-014A
- SATCAT no.: 26102

Spacecraft properties
- Manufacturer: Sandia National Laboratories
- Launch mass: 587 kg

Start of mission
- Launch date: 12 March 2000, 9:29 UTC
- Rocket: Minotaur-C
- Launch site: Vandenberg Launch Complex 576E

Multispectral Thermal Imager (MTI) was an American technology demonstration and Reconnaissance satellite operated by the National Nuclear Security Administration. Its goal was to demonstrate various multispectral and thermal imaging technologies for detection of weapons of mass destruction-producing facilities. Along with its primary Earth observation instruments, the satellite also carried the Hard X-Ray Spectrometer (HXRS) instrument developed in cooperation between NOAA and the Astronomical Institute of the Czech Academy of Sciences for monitoring solar flare-associated high-energy proton storms. MTI was launched on 12 March 2000 into a Sun-synchronous orbit by the Minotaur-C launch vehicle of Orbital Sciences.
