= Payload fairing =

Nose cone of a rocket used to protect spacecraft during launch

The being-encapsulated fairing for Nancy Grace Roman Space Telescope, to be launched on a Falcon Heavy.

An example of clamshell fairing of Falcon 9 during testing, 27 May 2013

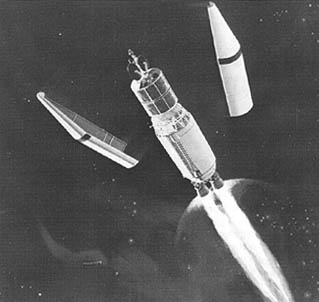
Artist's rendering of a payload fairing being jettisoned

A payload fairing or nose fairing is a nose cone used to protect a spacecraft payload against the impact of dynamic pressure and aerodynamic heating during launch through an atmosphere. It is also a type of heat shield. An additional function on some flights is to maintain the cleanroom environment for precision instruments. Once outside the atmosphere the fairing is jettisoned, exposing the payload to outer space.

The standard payload fairing is typically a cone-cylinder combination, due to aerodynamic considerations, although other specialized fairings are in use. The type of fairing which separates into two halves upon jettisoning is called a clamshell fairing by way of analogy to the bifurcating shell of a clam. In some cases the fairing may enclose both the payload and the upper stage of the rocket, such as on Atlas V and Proton M.

If the payload is attached both to the booster's core structures and to the fairing, the payload may still be affected by the fairing's bending loads, as well as inertia loads due to vibrations caused by gusts and buffeting.

In the aerospace industry, a frustum is the fairing between two stages of a multistage rocket (such as the Saturn V), which is shaped like a truncated cone (in geometry, a kind of frustum).

== Fairing retrieval and reuse ==
Payload fairings have usually been either burned up in the atmosphere or destroyed upon impacting the ocean, but SpaceX began to retrieve them in the 2010s with a fairing recovery program. On March 30, 2017, SpaceX successfully retrieved a fairing intact for the first time in history. For a second time on June 25, 2019, SpaceX was able to catch a fairing from the Falcon Heavy STP-2 launch. After this, SpaceX began reusing its fairings, which are manufactured at a cost of US$6 million per orbital launch; its CEO, Elon Musk, stated that retrieving the fairings before they touch sea water "makes refurbishment easier". As of September 20, 2026, SpaceX has also reflown fairing halves more than 300 times, with some being reflown 40 times, i.e., the most reflown rocket stage to space.

While a conventional payload fairing is typically jettisoned from the launch vehicle and recovered at sea, Rocket Lab's Neutron Rocket proposes to use a fairing that is integrated into the vehicle. This attached fairing would open during stage separation to release the second stage and payload and close again after stage separation, then return with the first stage when it lands back on Earth.

== Mission failures caused by payload fairings ==
In some cases, the fairing is planned to separate after cutoff of the upper stage, and in others, the separation is to occur before a cutoff, but after the vehicle has transcended the densest part of the atmosphere. Failure of the fairing to separate in these cases may cause the craft to fail to reach orbit, due to the extra mass.

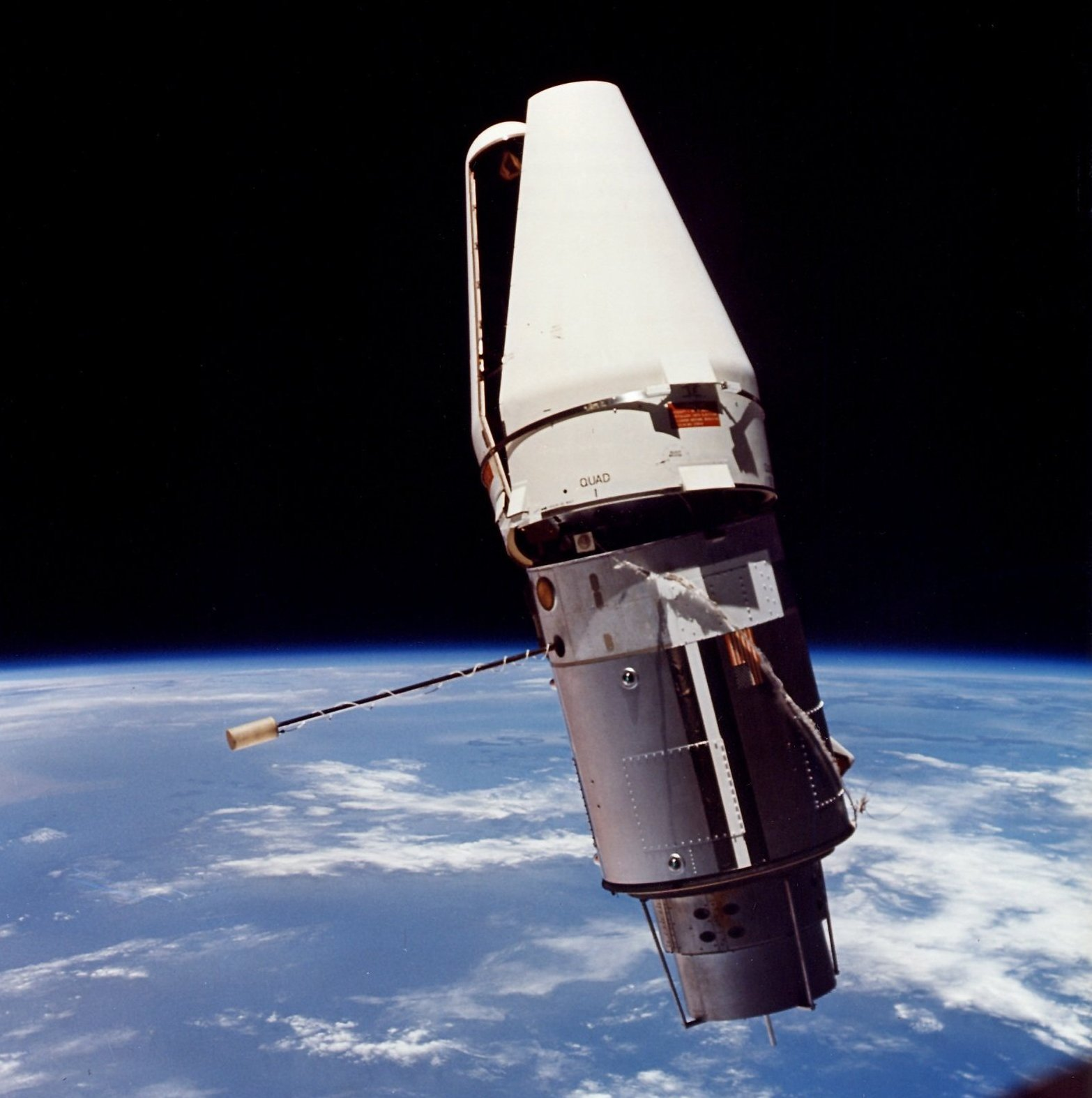
The Augmented Target Docking Adapter in orbit, with its payload fairing still attached

The Augmented Target Docking Adapter, to be used for the Gemini 9A crewed mission, was successfully placed into orbit by an Atlas SLV-3 in June 1966. But when the Gemini crew rendezvoused with it, they discovered the fairing had failed to open and separate, making docking impossible. Two lanyards, which should have been removed before flight, were still in place. The cause was determined to be a launch crew error.

In the 90's issues with payload fairing had caused numerous failures of the Long March 2E launch vehicle.

In 1999, the launch of the IKONOS-1 Earth observation satellite failed after the payload fairing of the Athena II rocket did not open properly, preventing the satellite from reaching orbit.

On February 24, 2009, NASA's Orbiting Carbon Observatory satellite failed to reach orbit after liftoff; the agency concluded that the fairing on the Taurus XL launch vehicle failed to separate, causing the vehicle to retain too much mass and subsequently fall back to Earth and land in the Indian Ocean near Antarctica.

The same happened to the Naro-1, South Korea's first carrier rocket, launched on August 25, 2009. During the launch, half of the payload's fairing failed to separate, and as a result, the rocket was thrown off course. The satellite did not reach a stable orbit.

On March 4, 2011, NASA's Glory satellite launch failed to reach orbit after liftoff due to a fairing separation failure on the Orbital Sciences Taurus XL launch vehicle, ending up in the Indian Ocean. This failure represented the second consecutive failure of a fairing on an Orbital Sciences Taurus XL vehicle. NASA subsequently decided to switch the launch vehicle for the Orbiting Carbon Observatory's replacement, OCO-2, from a Taurus to a Delta II rocket.

On August 31, 2017, ISRO's IRNSS-1H satellite failed to deploy after the payload fairing of the rocket PSLV-C39 failed to separate. As a result of extra mass, the rocket could not reach the desired orbit despite each stage's performance being nominal. The payload separated internally, but got stuck within the heat shield ( alternative name for the fairing ).

A Hyperbola-1 rocket failed on August 3, 2021. A day after launching, iSpace revealed that the payload fairing had failed to separate properly, resulting in the single satellite being unable to reach its intended orbit.

On February 10, 2022 Astra 3.3 launch failed. It is suspected that a fairing separation failure is to blame.

== Manufacturers ==
- RUAG Space, a Zurich-based company, is the manufacturer of fairings for Ariane, as part of the cooperation within the European space programme, and produces the 5m fairings for the Atlas V.
- SpaceX manufactures the fairings used on their launch vehicles.
- Indian launch vehicles' payload fairings are manufactured by Hindustan Aeronautics Ltd
- Japanese launch vehicles, such as H-IIA and Epsilon use payload fairings made by Kawasaki

== Image gallery ==
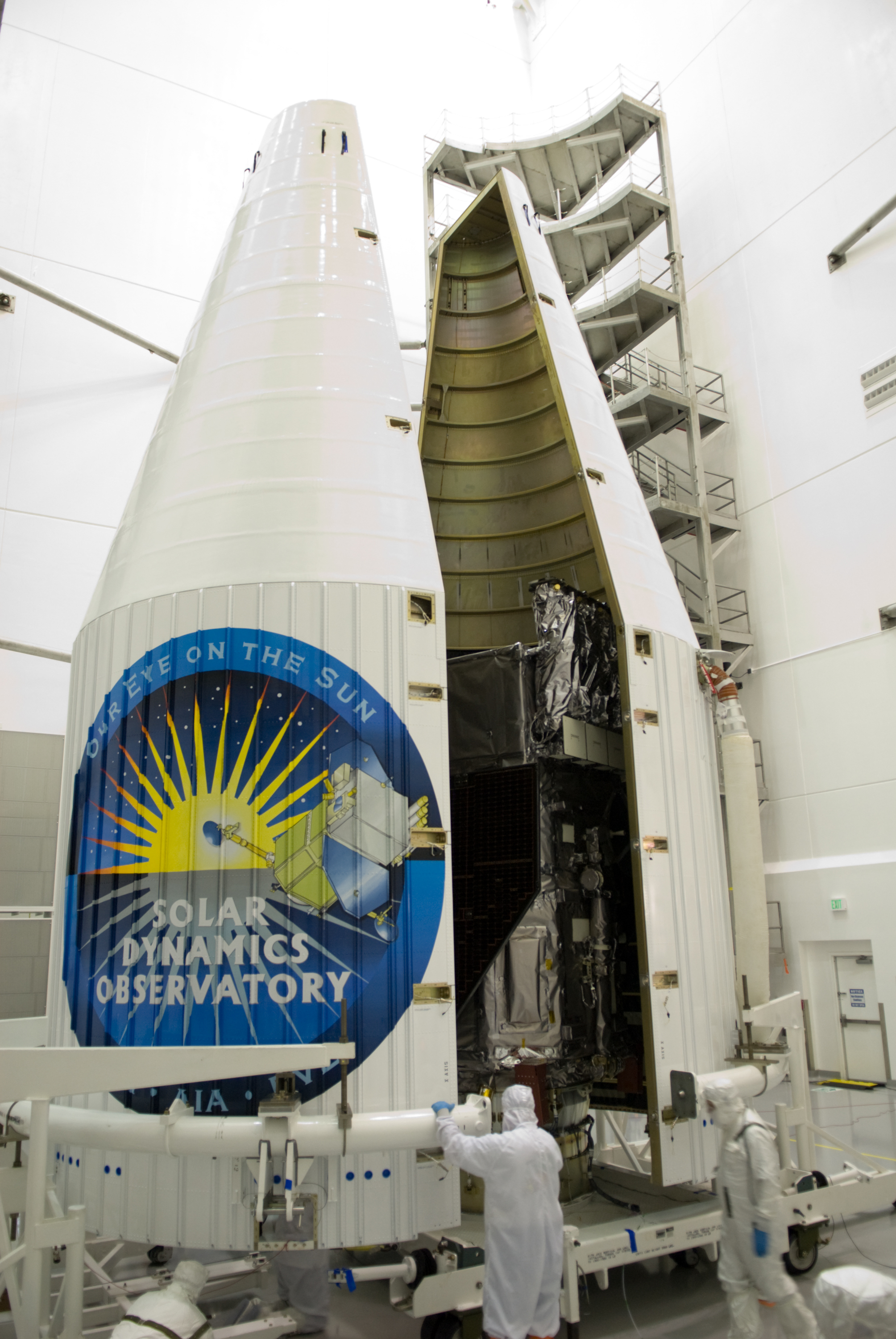
NASA's Solar Dynamics Observatory being encapsulated into its payload fairing

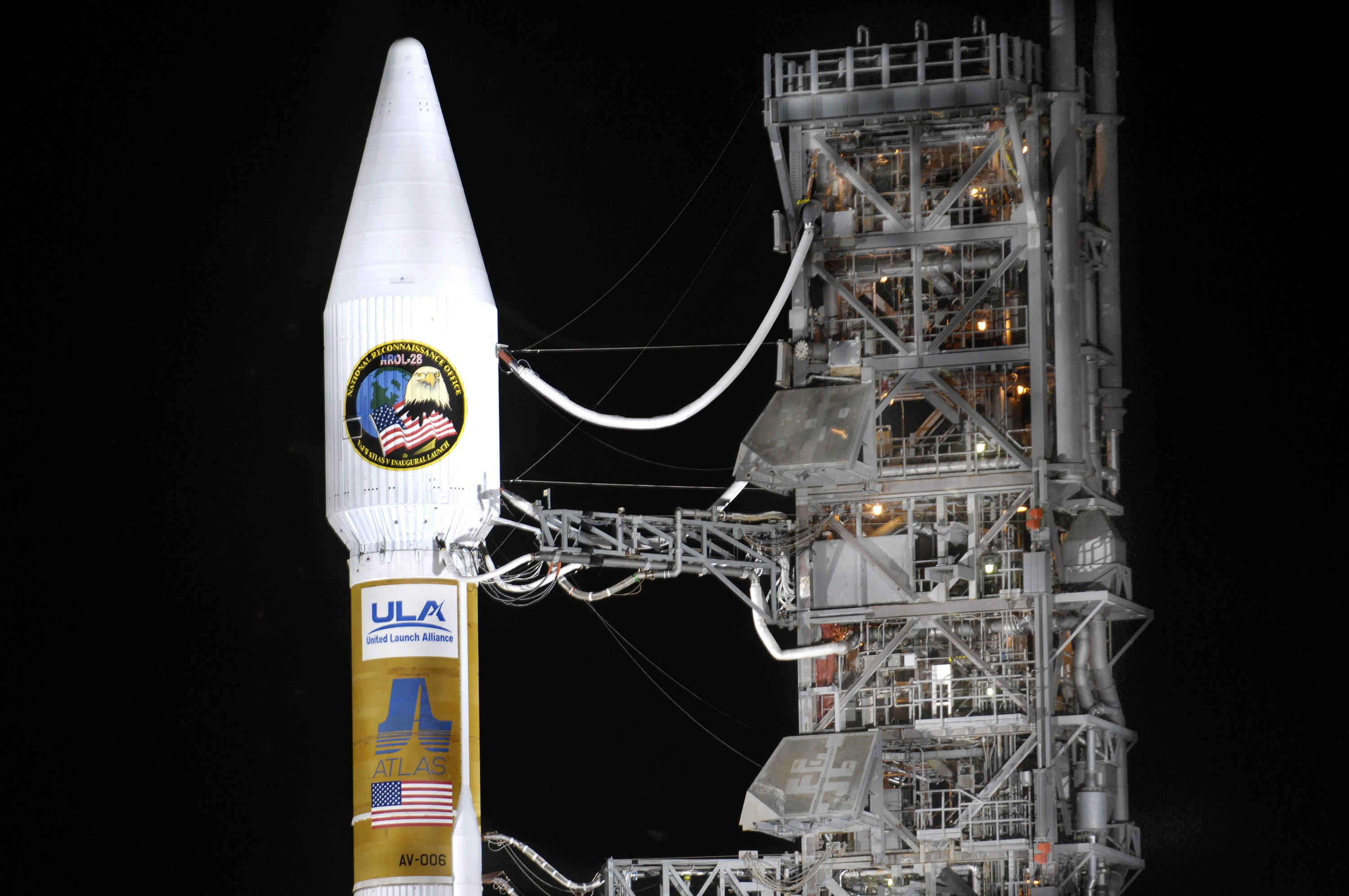
An Atlas 3 carrying a National Reconnaissance Office payload in its fairing, ready for launch

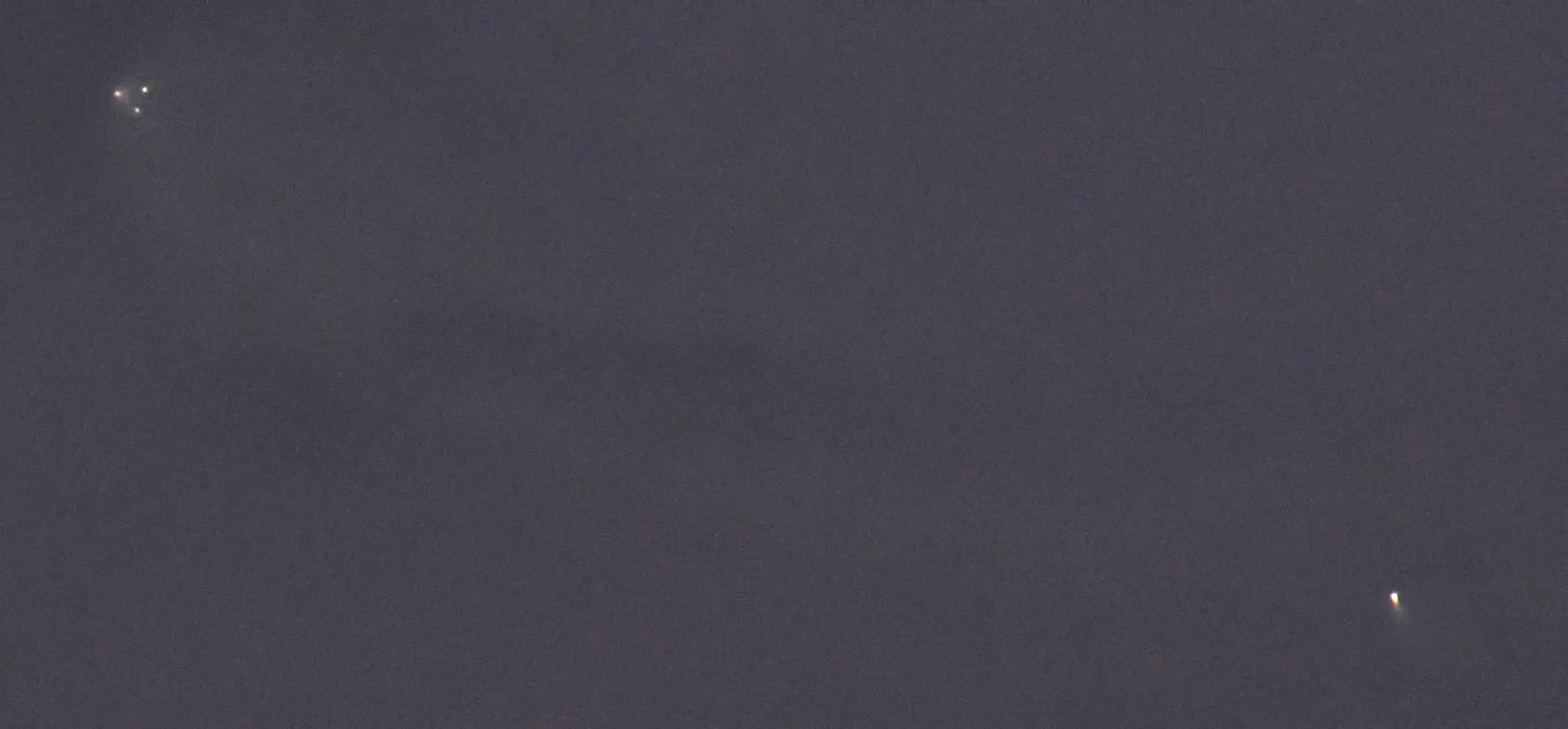
Falcon 9 second stage and two parts of payload fairing in the upper left; first stage in the lower right

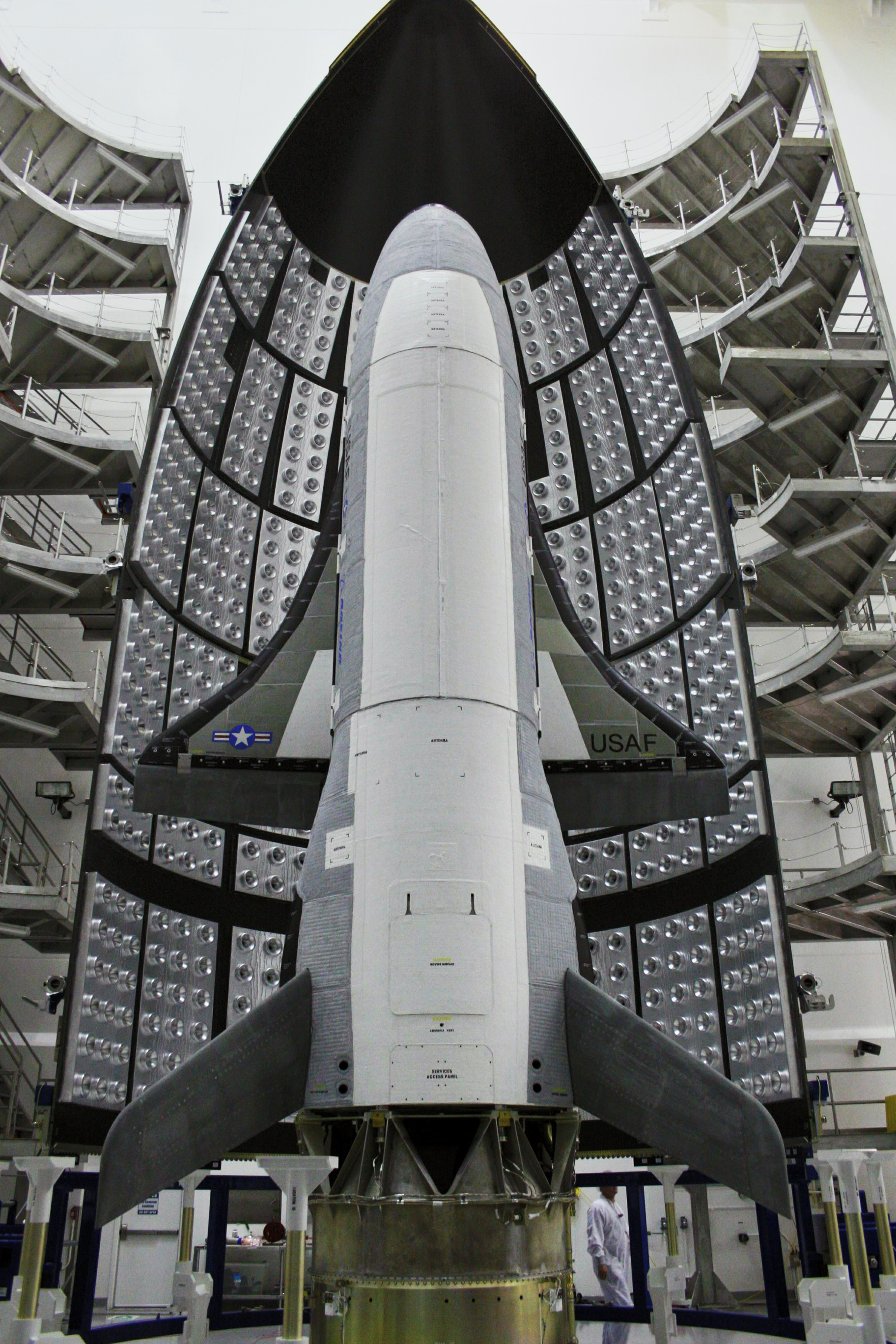
Boeing X-37B inside of Atlas V fairing before encapsulation

== See also ==
- Sabot
- Launch vehicle
- SpaceX fairing recovery program
