= Orion (rocket stage) =

Series of American solid-fuel rockets

Orion is a series of American solid-fuel rocket stages, developed and manufactured by a joint venture between Hercules Aerospace and Alliant Techsystems (now Northrop Grumman Innovation Systems). They were originally developed for use as all three stages on the Pegasus rocket, first flown in 1990. Orion is available in several configurations for a variety of use scenarios. All stages in this family use an ammonium perchlorate composite propellant called QDL-1, which includes HTPB binder and 19% aluminium, with the exception of the yet-unflown Orion 32, which uses QDL-2, containing HTPB binder and 20% aluminium.

== Versions ==
Orion stages are numbered to indicate their configuration. The first number, either 38 or 50, indicates the diameter of the stage. This is followed by various letters. S indicates a stretched, first stage variant. XL indicates an additional stretch. G indicates a ground-launched stage, with a shorter nozzle. T indicates a strengthened skirt.

	Diameter	Length	Gross mass	Burnout mass	Burn time (sec.)	Rocket (stage)
Orion 38	0.97 m (38 in)	1.3 m (53 in)	892 kg (1,966 lb)	110 kg (243 lb)	67.7	Pegasus (3rd); Pegasus XL (3rd); Antares (3rd); Minotaur-C (3rd); Minotaur I (4th); Minotaur IV (4th)
Orion 50/50T	1.3 m (50 in)	2.7 m (105 in)	3,369 kg (7,428 lb)	324 kg (715 lb)	75.6	Pegasus (2nd)
Orion 50XL/XLT	1.3 m (50 in)	3.1 m (122 in)	4,320 kg (9,520 lb)	374 kg (824 lb)	69.7	Minotaur (3rd); Pegasus XL (2nd); Taurus Lite (2nd); Taurus XL (2nd)
Orion 50ST	1.3 m (50 in)	8.5 m (333 in)	13,405 kg (29,554 lb)	952 kg (2,098 lb)	75	Minotaur-C (1st)
Orion 50S	1.3 m (50 in)	8.9 m (349 in)	13,405 kg (29,554 lb)	952 kg (2,098 lb)	75.3	Pegasus (1st)
Orion 50SXLG	1.3 m (50 in)	9.4 m (372 in)	16,200 kg (35,720 lb)	1,114 kg (2,456 lb)	68.4	Taurus Lite (1st)
Orion 50SXLT	1.3 m (50 in)	9.9 m (389 in)	16,181 kg (35,672 lb)	1,092 kg (2,408 lb)	68.4	Taurus XL (1st)
Orion 50SXL	1.3 m (50 in)	10.3 m (404 in)	16,173 kg (35,656 lb)	1,092 kg (2,408 lb)	69.1	Pegasus XL (1st)
