= Orbiting Carbon Observatory =

Failed NASA climate satellite

Orbiting Carbon Observatory (OCO)
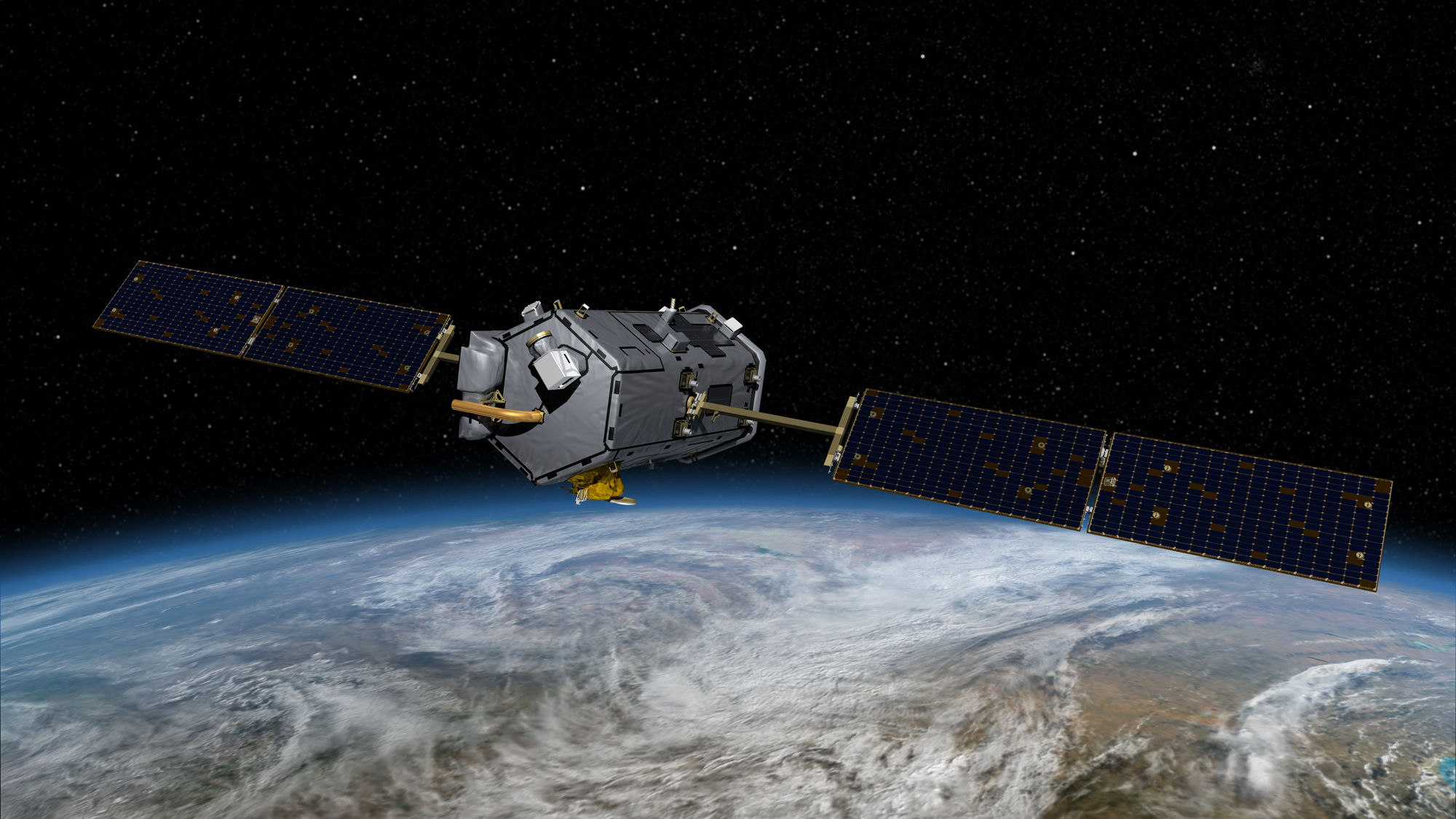
- An artist rendition of the OCO satellite as it would look in orbit.
- Mission type: Climatology
- Operator: NASA
- Mission duration: Launch failure 2 years (planned)

Spacecraft properties
- Bus: LEOStar-2
- Manufacturer: Orbital Sciences
- Launch mass: 530 kg (1,170 lb)
- Payload mass: 150 kg (330 lb)
- Dimensions: Stowed: 2.3 × 1.4 m (7.5 × 4.6 ft)
- Power: 786 W

Start of mission
- Launch date: 24 February 2009, 09:55:31 UTC
- Rocket: Taurus-XL 3110 (T8)
- Launch site: Vandenberg, LC-576E
- Contractor: Orbital Sciences

Orbital parameters
- Reference system: Geocentric
- Regime: Sun-synchronous
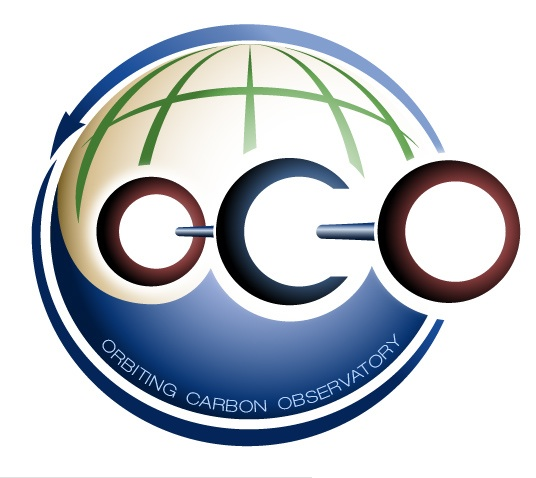

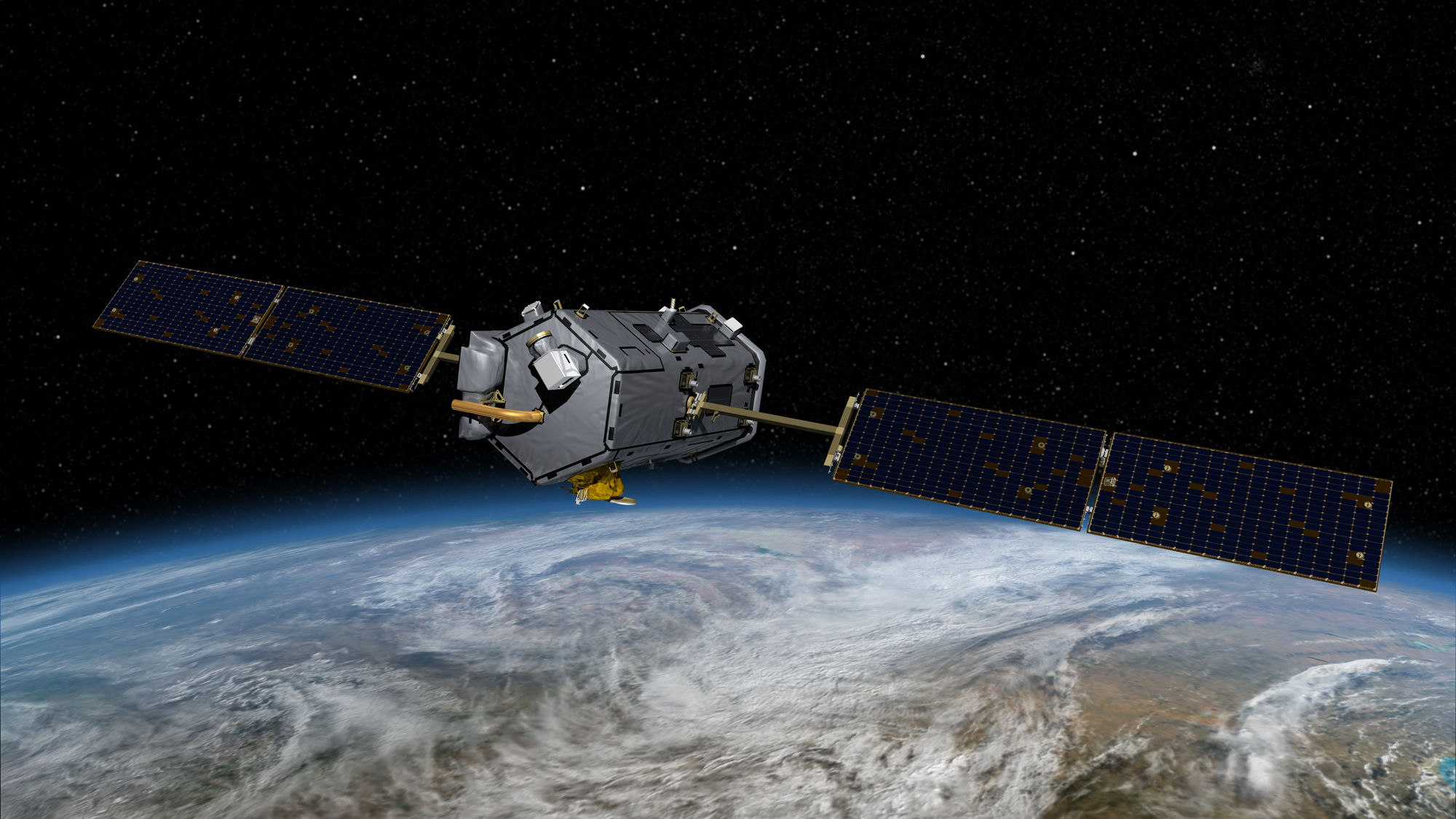
Orbiting Carbon Observatory

The Orbiting Carbon Observatory (OCO) was a NASA satellite mission intended to provide global space-based observations of atmospheric carbon dioxide (CO_{2}). The original spacecraft was lost in a launch failure on 24 February 2009, when the payload fairing of the Taurus rocket which was carrying it failed to separate during ascent. The added mass of the fairing prevented the satellite from reaching orbit. It subsequently re-entered the atmosphere and crashed into the Indian Ocean near Antarctica. The replacement satellite, Orbiting Carbon Observatory-2, was launched 2 July 2014 aboard a Delta II rocket. The Orbiting Carbon Observatory-3, a stand-alone payload built from the spare OCO-2 flight instrument, was installed on the International Space Station's Kibō Exposed Facility in May 2019.

== Mission description ==
OCO's measurements are designed to be accurate enough to show for the first time the geographic distribution of carbon dioxide sources and sinks on a regional scale. The data is planned to improve the understanding of the global carbon cycle, the natural processes and human activities that influence the abundance and distribution of the greenhouse gas. This improved understanding is expected to enable more reliable forecasts of future changes in the abundance and distribution of carbon dioxide in the atmosphere and the effect that these changes may have on Earth's climate.

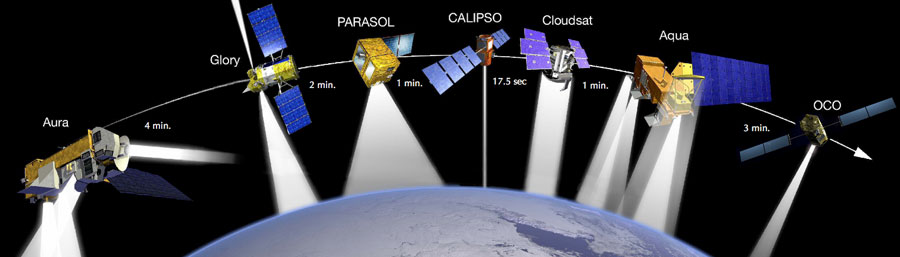
The A-Train satellite constellation.

The OCO spacecraft was provided by Orbital Sciences Corporation. During its two-year mission, OCO will fly in a near polar orbit which enables the instrument to observe most of Earth's surface at least once every sixteen days. It is intended to fly in loose formation with a series of other Earth-orbiting satellites known as the Earth Observing System Afternoon Constellation, or the A-train. This coordinated flight formation was intended to enable researchers to correlate OCO data with data acquired by other instruments on other spacecraft. In particular, Earth scientists would like to compare OCO data with nearly simultaneous measurements acquired by the Atmospheric Infrared Sounder (AIRS) instrument aboard NASA's Aqua satellite and ground-based data from the Total Carbon Column Observing Network (TCCON). Alignment with the A-train demands a particularly short launch window of 30 seconds.

The original cost of the mission was US$280 million. It was sponsored by NASA's Earth System Science Pathfinder Program. NASA's Jet Propulsion Laboratory in Pasadena, California, manages OCO for NASA's Science Mission Directorate.

== Technology ==
The satellite will carry a single instrument designed to make the most precise measurements of atmospheric carbon dioxide ever made from space. The instrument consists of three parallel, high-resolution spectrometers, integrated into a common structure and fed by a common telescope. The spectrometers will make simultaneous measurements of the carbon dioxide and molecular oxygen absorption of sunlight reflected off the same location on Earth's surface when viewed in the near-infrared part of the electromagnetic spectrum, invisible to the human eye.

As sunlight passes through Earth's atmosphere and is reflected from Earth's surface, molecules of atmospheric gases absorb very specific colors of light. If the light is divided into a rainbow of colors, called a spectrum, the specific colors absorbed by each gas appear as dark lines. Different gases absorb different colors, so the pattern of absorption lines provides a telltale spectral "fingerprint" for that molecule. OCO's spectrometers were designed to detect these molecular fingerprints.

Each of the three spectrometers was tuned to measure the absorption in a specific range of colors. Each of these ranges includes dozens of dark absorption lines produced by either carbon dioxide or molecular oxygen. The amount of light absorbed in each spectral line increases with the number of molecules along the optical path. OCO's spectrometers measure the fraction of the light absorbed in each of these lines with very high precision. This information was then to be analyzed to determine the number of molecules along the path between the top of the atmosphere and the surface.

If the amount of carbon dioxide varies from place to place, the amount of absorption will also vary. To resolve these variations, the observatory's instrument will record an image of the spectrum produced by each spectrometer three times every second as the satellite flies over the surface at more than four miles per second. This information would then be transmitted to the ground, where carbon dioxide concentrations would be retrieved in four separate footprints for each image collected. These spatially varying carbon dioxide concentration estimates would then be analyzed using global transport models, like those used for weather prediction, to infer the locations of carbon dioxide sources and sinks.

The OCO instrument was developed by Hamilton Sundstrand Sensor Systems in Pomona, California, and the Jet Propulsion Laboratory.

== Original launch ==
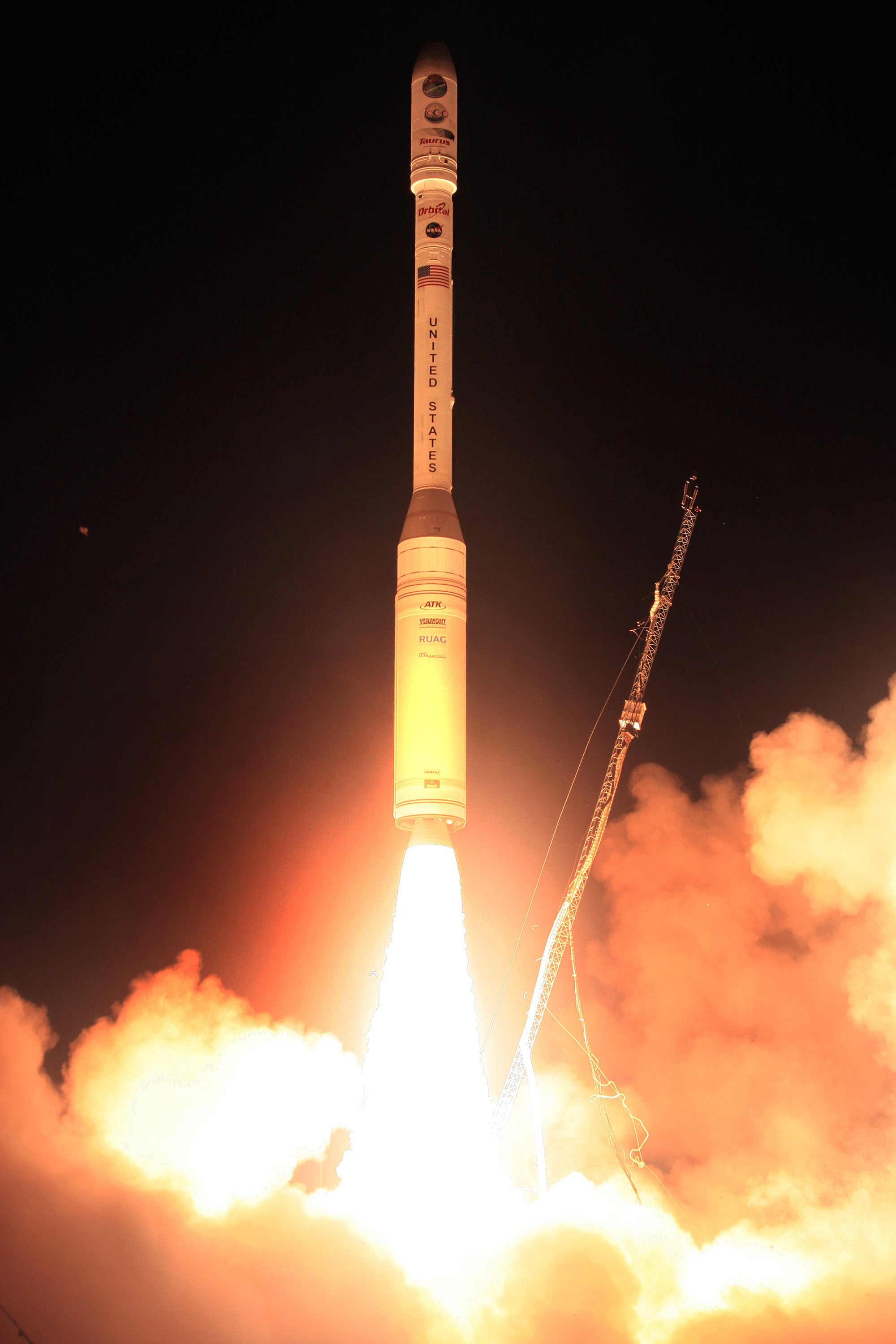
The launch of OCO's Taurus XL rocket.

The satellite was originally launched from Vandenberg Air Force Base in California on a dedicated Taurus XL rocket. However, the payload fairing—a clam shell-shaped covering that protects the satellite during launch—apparently failed to separate from the spacecraft. "We have not had a successful launch tonight and will not be able to have a successful OCO mission", NASA commentator George Diller said.

- Date: 24 February 2009, 09:55:31 UTC
- Launch Vehicle: Orbital Sciences, Taurus-XL
- Launch Site: Vandenberg Air Force Base, Launch Complex 576-E

A payload fairing is a clamshell-shaped cover that encloses and protects a payload on the pad and during early flight. Fairings are a standard component of expendable launch vehicles, and are always jettisoned as soon as possible after a rocket has climbed high enough for heating from air friction to no longer risk damaging the payload. The Taurus XL's fairing was intended to separate several seconds after stage 2 ignition. Its extra mass was not a significant factor during the flight of the larger lower stages, but kept the relatively small stage 3 from adding enough velocity to reach orbit. 17 minutes after liftoff the payload fell into the ocean near Antarctica. NASA investigators later determined the cause for the launch failure to be faulty materials provided by aluminum manufacturer Sapa Profiles.

== Re-flight ==
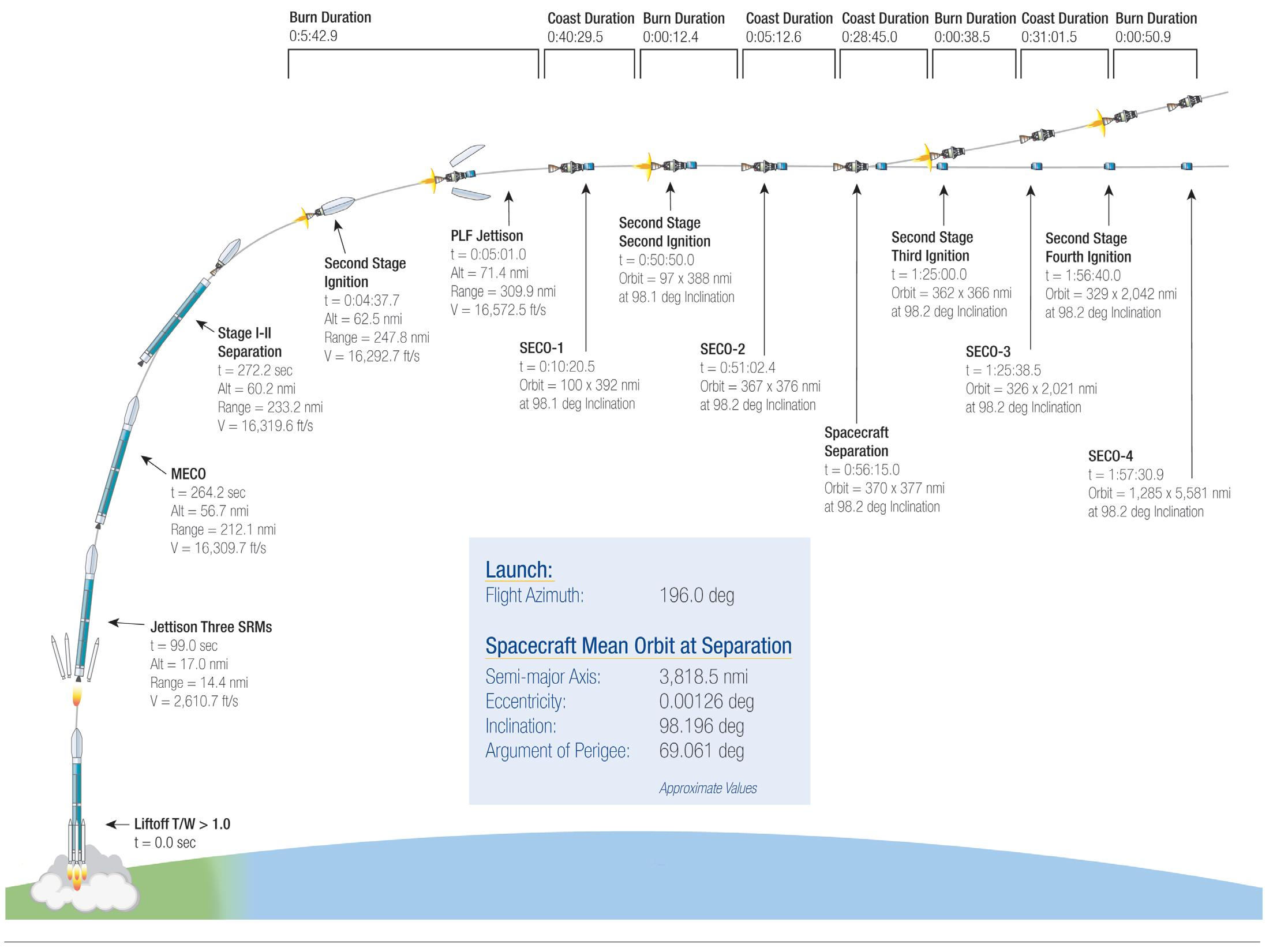
Flight plan of OCO-2

Three days after the failed February 2009 launch, the OCO science team sent NASA headquarters a proposal to build and launch an OCO copy by late 2011. On 1 February 2010, the FY 2011 NASA budget request did include $170 million for NASA to develop and fly a replacement for the Orbiting Carbon Observatory: OCO-2.

NASA, in 2010, initially selected Orbital Sciences for launching the replacement in February 2013 on a Taurus XL 3110 from Vandenberg Air Force Base in California. The launch of the Glory satellite took place on 4 March 2011 and ended in failure, like OCO. Then, in February 2012 both NASA and Orbital Sciences came to an agreement to terminate the launch contract.

OCO-2 was initially scheduled for launch on 1 July 2014 at 09:56 UTC aboard a Delta II rocket, though that launch was scrubbed at 46 seconds on the countdown clock due to a faulty valve on the water suppression system that is used to flow water on the launch pad to dampen the acoustic energy during launch. The rocket launched 2 July at the same time.

== NASA Investigation ==
NASA Launch Services Program (LSP) investigators have determined the technical root cause for the Taurus XL launch failures of NASA's Orbiting Carbon Observatory (OCO) and Glory missions in 2009 and 2011, respectively: faulty materials provided by aluminium manufacturer, Sapa Profiles, Inc. (SPI). LSP's technical investigation led to the involvement of NASA's Office of the Inspector General and the U.S. Department of Justice (DOJ). The efforts of the DOJ, recently made public, resulted in the resolution of criminal charges and alleged civil claims against SPI, and its agreement to pay $46 million to the U.S. government and other commercial customers. This relates to a 19-year scheme that included falsifying thousands of certifications for aluminium extrusions to hundreds of customers.

On 24 February 2009, a Taurus XL rocket (Taurus T8) carrying NASA's Orbiting Carbon Observatory (OCO) satellite failed to reach orbit. The Taurus T8 mission failed because the payload fairing did not separate during ascent, causing the rocket to not shed weight. As a result of the extra weight, the Taurus rocket failed to reach orbital velocity, resulting in a total loss of the mission. On 4 March 2011, another Taurus rocket (Taurus T9) carrying NASA's Glory scientific satellite failed to reach orbit. The Taurus T9 mission also concluded in a failure of the payload fairing to separate. The Taurus T8 and T9 missions both reentered earth's atmosphere resulting in break-up and/or burnup of the rocket and satellite, and any surviving pieces would have been dispersed in the Pacific Ocean near Antarctica. The combined cost of both mission failures was in excess of $700 million. This document's purpose is to provide a top-level outline of NASA's updated findings pertaining to the cause of both mishaps.

The Taurus T8 and T9 rockets both used 63-inch diameter payload fairings to cover and protect the spacecraft during ground operations and launch. The payload fairing halves are structurally joined and attached to the rocket using frangible joints. A frangible joint is a structural separation system that is initiated using ordnance. Initiation of the ordnance causes the ligament of the frangible joint extrusion to fracture, allowing the two payload fairing halves to be separated and subsequently jettisoned from the Taurus rocket. The frangible joints for T8 and T9 were made and assembled together, at the same time. The T8 and T9 frangible joint extrusions were manufactured by Sapa Profiles, Inc. (SPI) in its Technical Dynamics Aluminum (TDA) plant, in Portland, Oregon.

== See also ==
- Glory (satellite)—also lost in a launch failure when the payload fairing of the Taurus rocket which was carrying it failed to separate during ascent.
- Greenhouse Gases Observing Satellite
- Orbiting Carbon Observatory 3
