= RS1 (rocket) =

Launch vehicle platform by American aerospace company Long Wall

- Function: Small-lift launch vehicle
- Manufacturer: Long Wall
- Country of origin: United States
- Cost per launch: US$12 million

Size
- Height: 26.8 m (88 ft)
- Diameter: 1.83 m (6 ft 0 in)
- Stages: 2

Capacity

Payload to LEO
- Orbital inclination: 28.5°
- Mass: 1,350 kg (2,980 lb)

Payload to SSO
- Orbital inclination: 98.7°
- Mass: 970 kg (2,140 lb)

Payload to GTO
- Orbital inclination: 28.5°
- Mass: 320 kg (710 lb)

Launch history
- Status: Retired
- Launch sites: Kodiak Island, LP-3C
- Total launches: 1
- Failure: 1
- Notable outcome: 1 (pre-flight destruction)
- First flight: 10 January 2023

First stage (Block 1)
- Diameter: 1.83 m (6 ft 0 in)
- Powered by: 9 × E2 Sea Level
- Maximum thrust: 485 kN (109,000 lb_{f})
- Propellant: RP-1 or Jet-A / LOX

First stage (Block 2)
- Diameter: 1.83 m (6 ft 0 in)
- Powered by: 11 × E2 Sea Level
- Maximum thrust: 591.615 kN (133,000 lb_{f})
- Propellant: RP-1 or Jet-A / LOX

Second stage
- Diameter: 1.82 m (6 ft 0 in)
- Powered by: 1 × E2 Vacuum
- Maximum thrust: 58 kN (13,000 lb_{f})
- Propellant: RP-1 or Jet-A / LOX

RS1, also called RSX, is Long Wall's main launch vehicle platform. Both stages are powered by the company's E2 rocket engine, with nine (Block 1) to eleven (Block 2) in the first stage, and one in the second stage. They are powered by Jet-A kerosene as fuel and liquid oxygen (LOX) as the oxidizer, with the option to use RP-1 fuel for higher performance.

The containerized launch system and rocket can be deployed to and launched from a suitably flat site, the main requirements being access for trucks capable of carrying up to 16 m (52 ft)-long ISO containers (for the RS-1 first stage), and a flat concrete pad 46 m (151 ft) x 15 m (49 ft).

== History ==
In 2020, Long Wall was planning the first orbital launch of its RS1 rocket in 2022. The firm received contracts worth US$44.5 million from the United States Air Force, as well as private funding equaling US$49 million. According to founder Dan Piemont, the US$44.5 million Air Force contracts include a one-year deal from the tech incubator AFWERX to demonstrate launch technology and an agreement with Space and Missile Systems Center's Space Enterprise Consortium to conduct three demonstrations of a RS1 vehicle variant and deployable ground infrastructure in 2022.

RS1 claimed to be capable of carrying a payload of 1,350 kg (2,980 lb) to low Earth orbit. It was 27 m (89 ft) tall. Claimed launch price was US$12 million per flight. Long Wall had over 70 launch agreements.

The maiden flight on January 10, 2023, failed after a fire in the aft cavity damaged key harnessing, causing the engines to shut down 11 seconds into flight. RS1 crashed down near the launch pad, damaging infrastructure at the Pacific Spaceport Complex. The second attempt at launch failed on July 19, 2024 due to a static fire testing failure. After the second flight failure, the company decided to terminate their commercial launch program, and instead focusing on turning RS1 into a missile defense launch vehicle.

Long Wall was also developing a modified RS1 with first stage engine replaced with an aerospike engine, as part of AFRL's ARISE program. In September 2022, AFRL designated X plane number X-63 to this modified RS1 configuration. A test launch was initially scheduled for 2023, but has now since been delayed to an unspecified time.

=== Previous design ===
In 2019, RS1 was planned to have three E1 engines, each producing 190,000 N (42,000 lbf) of thrust to power the rocket's first stage. A single E2 engine, with 58,000 N (13,000 lbf) of thrust, was planned for the rocket's second stage. Both engines would use liquid oxygen and RP-1 propellants. The first development build of the vehicle has been completed.

== Testing ==
In 2019, Long Wall conducted testing of the E2 rocket engine at the company's test facilities at Spaceport America, New Mexico, which "provided the perfect location and support staff for us to test the E2 rocket engine". The test was considered a success.

In early 2020, the Air Force Research Laboratory (AFRL) joined with Long Wall to test and develop rocket-propulsion components. In October 2020, the second stage with E2 engine was tested at Edwards Air Force Base.

On 19 January 2022, an anomaly during testing at Mojave Air and Space Port resulted in the destruction of the second stage of the RS1 rocket. On 27 January, the source of the anomaly was publicly identified by Long Wall CEO Harry O'Hanley as being one of the second stage's E2 Vacuum engine's turbopumps suffering a hard start, which led to a "substantial fire on the aft end of the vehicle, resulting in a complete failure about 20 seconds later".

After three earlier attempts to launch their RS1 rocket in December 2022, the company shifted the launch attempt to January 2023. The maiden flight on January 10, 2023 failed.

The second attempt at an orbital launch (DEMO-2 mission) was precluded as the rocket being prepared for that launch suffered irreparable damage in a fire at the launch pad following a static-fire test on 19 July 2024.

== Launch sites ==
=== Pacific Spaceport Complex ===
The first RS1 flight was planned for 2022 from the Pacific Spaceport Complex on Kodiak Island, but the launch attempt was aborted. After two additional aborts, the first launch occurred on January 10, 2023. The maiden flight also failed and did not reach orbit.

=== Cape Canaveral ===
On 1 November 2021, Amazon announced that the first two prototype satellites of the Kuiper constellation, KuiperSat-1 and KuiperSat-2, would be launched using RS1 in the fourth quarter of 2022 from Launch Complex 48 at Kennedy Space Center. Amazon subsequently shifted these satellites to Vulcan Centaur, subsequently moving them to an Atlas V launch on October 6, 2023. Meanwhile on March 7th, 2023, it was announced that the Space Force allocated Long Wall Launch Complex 15 at Cape Canaveral Space Force Station.

=== Vandenberg ===
In the late 2010s, the company announced they received a right of entry to use Launch Complex 576E at Vandenberg Space Force Base for the RS1. As of 2020, their first launch from the complex was planned in 2021.

=== SaxaVord Spaceport ===
On 7 February 2021, Lockheed Martin and the United Kingdom announced a contract with Long Wall to launch the UK Pathfinder mission (6 CubeSats) in 2022, from the Shetland Space Centre on the island of Unst, Scotland. The UK Pathfinder launch was scheduled to take place in late 2024.

== Launches ==
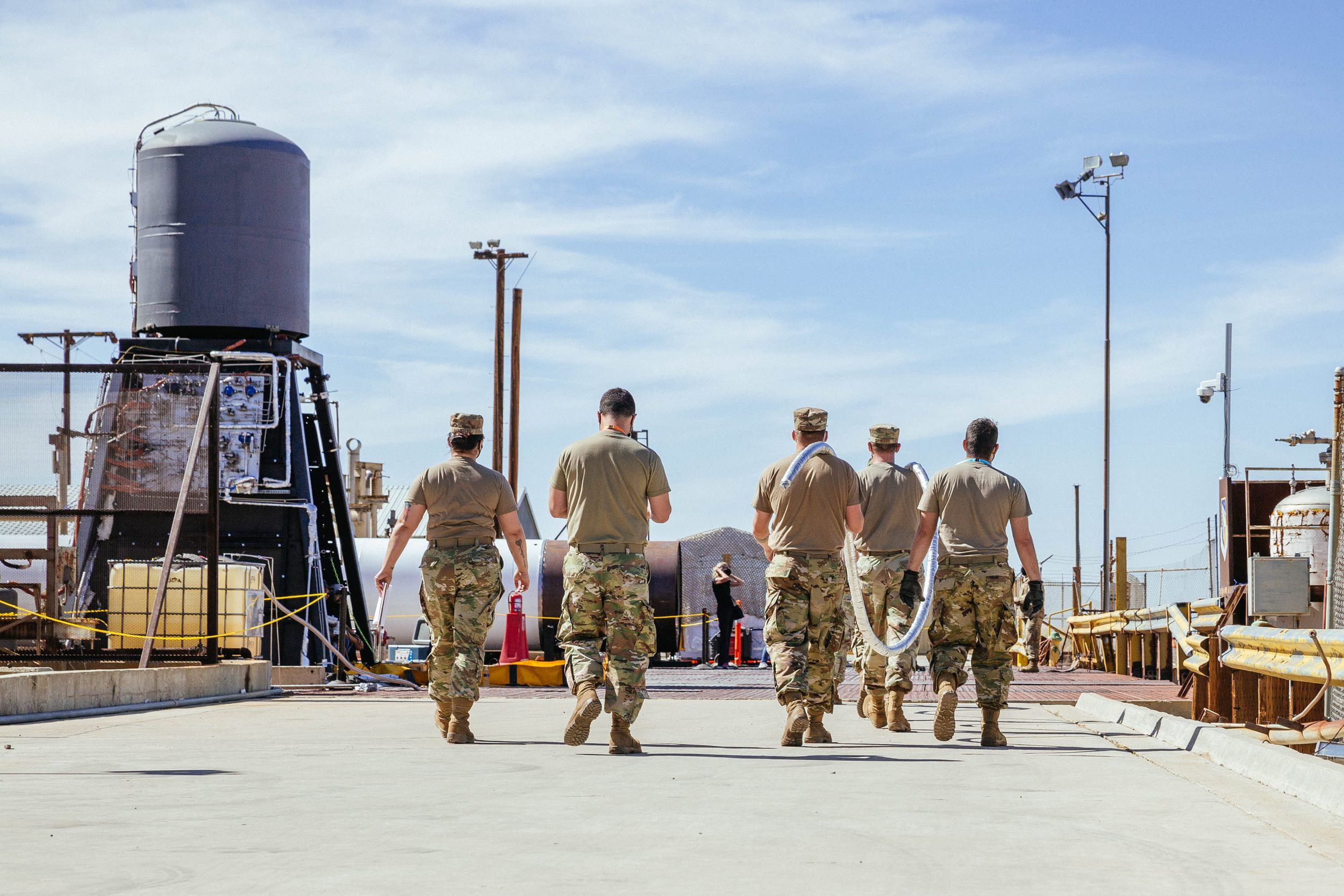
412th Test Wing conducting launch demonstration with RS1 and GS0

Flight No.	Name	Date and time (UTC)	Launch site	Payload	Payload mass	Orbit	Customer	Launch outcome
1	DEMO-1	10 January 2023	Kodiak, LP-3C	VariSat 1A & 1B	Unknown	Polar (200 x 350 km x 87°)	OmniTeq	Failure
1	First flight of the RS1 launch vehicle. The vehicle suffered an anomaly shortly after liftoff and was destroyed. Failure was attributed to an overly restrictive launch mount and flame diverter causing plume recirculation and overloading of headshield causing fire. Fire subsequently caused damage to key harnesses causing loss of power and simultaneous loss of thrust in all engines due to de-energization of valves.							
N/A	DEMO-2	19 July 2024	Kodiak, LP-3C	—N/a	—N/a	Polar (200 x 275 km x 87°)	—N/a	Precluded (failure pre-flight)
N/A	Second RS-1 vehicle equipped with 11 E2 engines was irrecoverably damaged during pre-flight testing							

== See also ==
- Rocket Lab Electron
- Firefly Alpha
