= Egil Hogna =

Norwegian business executive

Egil Olav Hogna
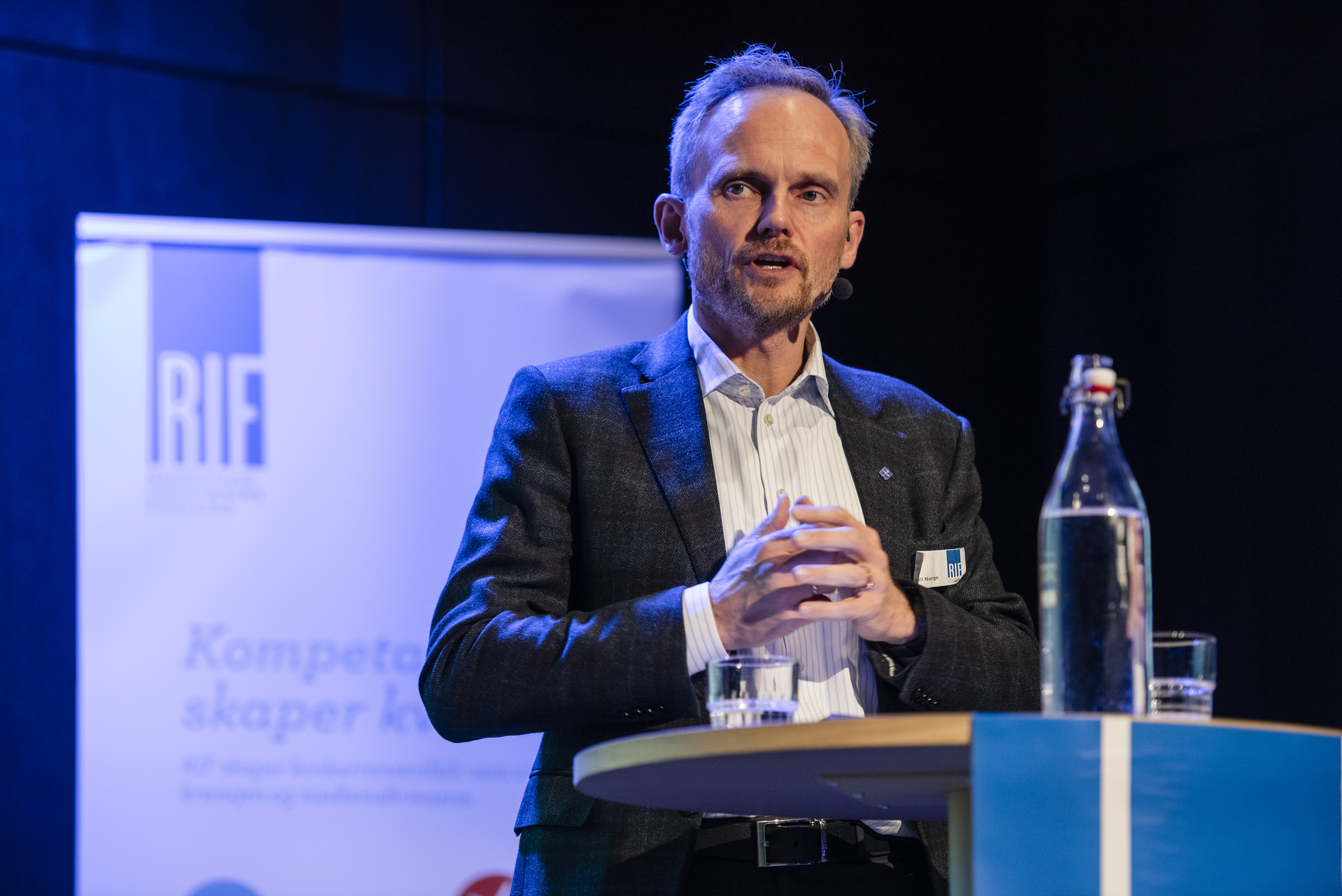
- Born: 12 March 1971 (age 55); Oslo, Norway
- Education: Master of Science degree from the Norwegian University of Science and Technology, NTNU, in Trondheim. MBA from INSEAD. AMP from Harvard Business School
- Alma mater: Norwegian University of Science and Technology; INSEAD; Harvard Business School
- Occupations: CEO, Norconsult
- Spouse: Ann Karin Belsvik Hogna

Egil Olav Hogna (born 12 March 1971) is a Norwegian engineer and business executive. On 1 September 2015 he was appointed new CEO of Sapa Group, the world's largest aluminium processor with NOK 53 billion in turnover and 22,400 employees in 40 countries. Following Hydro's acquisition of Sapa in 2017, Sapa was integrated as Hydro's largest business area. Hogna led the Extruded Solutions business area from 2017 to 2020. On 1 December 2020, he took over as CEO of Norconsult. Hogna has a master's degree in Industrial Economics from NTNU in Trondheim. He holds an MBA from INSEAD and a management education from Harvard Business School.

== Career ==
=== McKinsey & Company ===
From 1994 to 1999 Hogna was a consultant for McKinsey & Company, where he worked in the company's Oslo office together with Hugo Maurstad, Fredrik Halvorsen and Reynir Indahl among others.

=== Hydro ===
In 1999 he became the Corporate Controller of Norsk Hydro Agri. He worked closely with the then CEO Thorleif Enger in the project which was later named Agri Turnaround, the major turnaround operation between 1999 and 2001 which was the reason why Yara was spun off from Hydro and listed as a separate company on the Oslo Stock Exchange in March 2004. Starting January 2002 to September 2003 he was the Vice President at Hydro Aluminium Metal Products responsible for Supply Chain & Performance Management.

=== Yara ===
From 2003 to 2006, Hogna was head of investor relations in connection with the listing of Yara (2004–2006). Hogna has later stated that he believes this experience was part of the reason why he got the position as CEO in Sapa. In January 2007, Hogna moved to Paris to become Business Unit Manager for Yara International in Southern Europe with responsibility for approximately 400 employees and US$800 million in revenues. In the summer of 2008, he moved up to become CFO of the company before he became Executive Vice President of Downstream at Yara International in 2009. From 2009 to 2012, he sat on the board of Qatar Fertilizer Company (Qafco).

=== Sapa ===
On August 26, 2015, it was announced that Svein Tore Holsether left Sapa to become CEO of the Norwegian fertilizer company Yara International ASA, at the same time Hogna became the new CEO of Sapa. In April 2016 Egil Hogna opened Sapa's first North American automotive-focused R&D lab facility in Detroit, Michigan handling automotive customers like Jaguar Land Rover and Tesla. Hogna is concerned with a flat organizational structure and made a point of spending the first 100 days visiting as many production sites as possible and meeting employees, including in Suzhou, west of Shanghai, Tønder in Denmark, the east and west coasts of the US and an R&D centre in Finspång Sweden.

=== Hydro ===
On 2 October 2017, Hydro took over Sapa, and Sapa was integrated as Hydro's largest business area with 22,500 employees in 40 countries. In his role as Executive Vice President for Extruded Solutions, Hogna continued with a strong focus on technology and innovation, customer proximity and sustainability aimed at important segments such as the automotive industry and the construction sector. He was vital in the launch of the recycled product Hydro CIRCAL to the construction sector, and a driving force in introducing the low-carbon metal Hydro REDUXA to a number of segments in Europe. During his time at Hydro, he also led the business area through two major crises; the cyber attack in 2019 and the handling of COVID-19 in 2020.

=== Norconsult ===
On 1 December 2020, Hogna took up the position of CEO of Norconsult, Norway's largest and one of the leading interdisciplinary consulting companies in the Nordic region, focusing on community planning, engineering and architecture. In 2020 Norconsult was Norway’s largest employee-owned company with 4600 employees. When it was listed on the Oslo Stock Exchange in 2023 it became the largest IPO in Norway that year. From 2021 to 2025 the company made 26 acquisitions and had 7200 employees early 2026.

== The Tesla of the Seas ==
In an article in Dagens Næringsliv in March 2016, Hogna wrote that Norway could create "The Tesla of the Seas" with reference to the project Urban Water Shuttle from Fjellstrand (shipyard) and the business cluster Maritime Clean Tech West, an emission-free fast ferry built in aluminium with support from Sapa and Hydro.

== Sustainability ==
Hogna has stated that recycling and environmental technology is key area and that Sapa is behind a new range of transformable, aluminium-framed furniture developed for IKEA to be launched in 2018.

Following US President Donald Trump’s withdrawal from the Paris Climate Agreement, Hogna tweeted "Sometimes politicians are not able to make the right choices. All the more reason for business to step up."

Like Virgin's Richard Branson and Unilever's Paul Polman, Egil Hogna, under the auspices of the Oslo-based Business for Peace Foundation, has made a promise to lead Sapa so that the UN's sustainability goals can be achieved. The business leaders who have signed so far represent companies with a total turnover of more than NOK 5,700 billion and more than 2.2 million employees.

== Private life ==
Hogna loves to run and came in with the time 3:18:16 as number 487 in his age group in the New York Marathon in 2013.
