= Glory (satellite) =

Failed NASA satellite mission

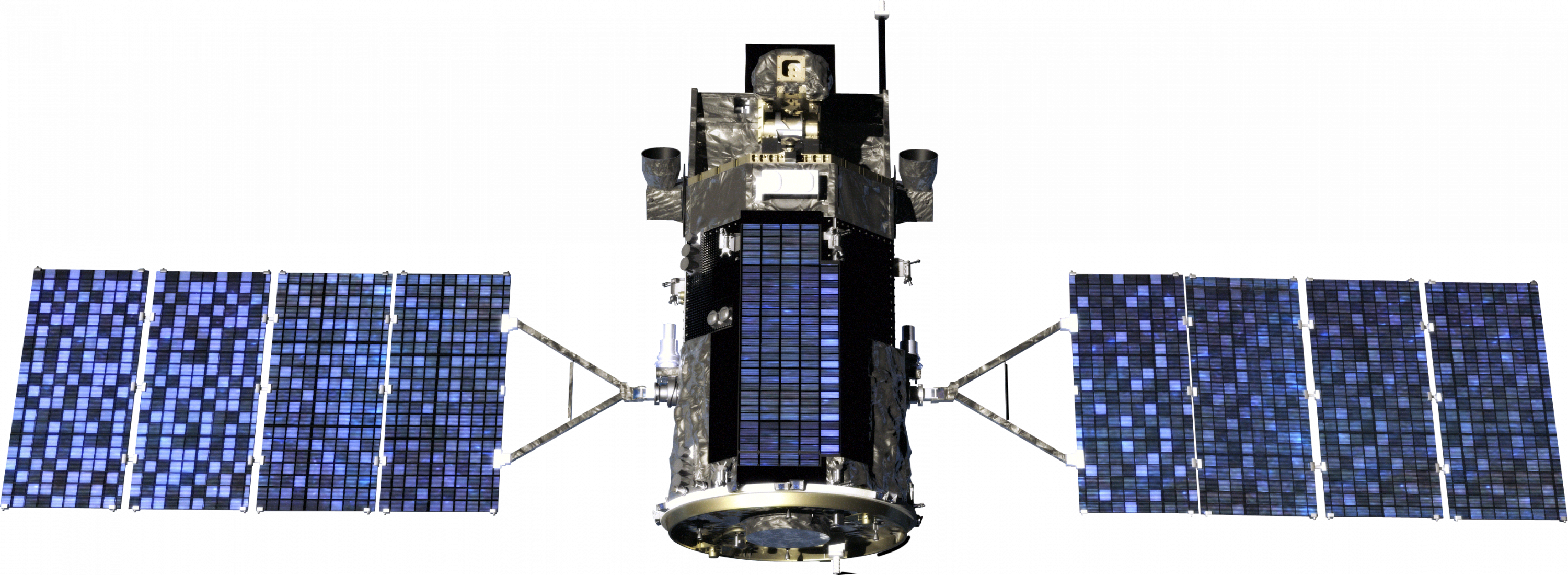
- Artist's impression of Glory
- Mission type: Climate research
- Operator: NASA / GSFC
- Website: www.nasa.gov/mission_pages/Glory/main/
- Mission duration: Failed to orbit 3 years (planned)

Spacecraft properties
- Launch mass: 545 kilograms (1,202 lb)
- Power: 400 watts

Start of mission
- Launch date: 4 March 2011, 10:09:43 UTC
- Rocket: Taurus XL 3110 (T9)
- Launch site: Vandenberg, LC-576E
- Contractor: Orbital Sciences

Orbital parameters
- Reference system: Geocentric
- Regime: Low Earth
- Epoch: Planned

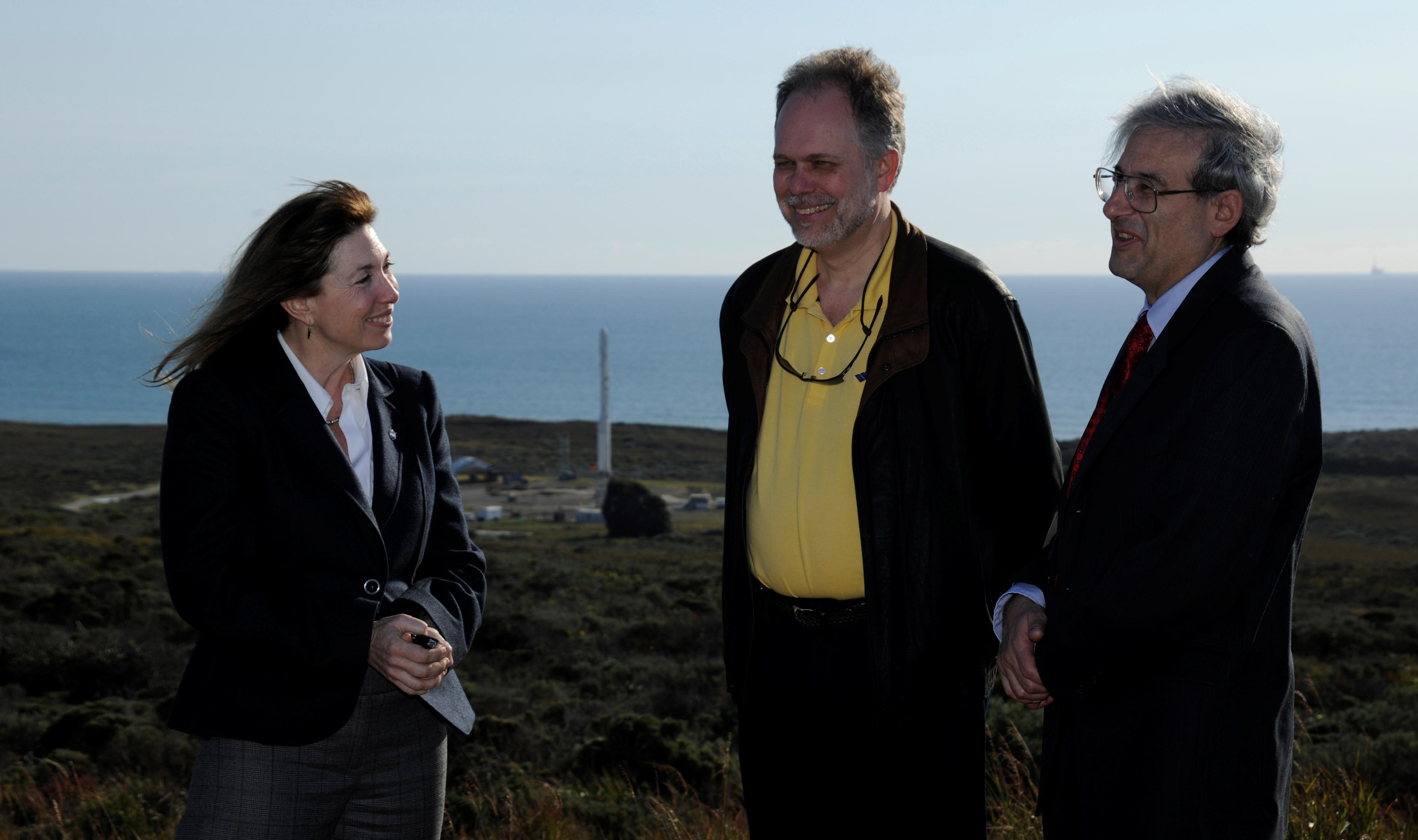
On 23 February 2011, NASA Deputy Administrator Lori Garver (left) visited the mission's launch site.

The Glory satellite was a 2011 failed NASA satellite mission that was to have collected data on the chemical, micro-physical and optical properties—and the spatial and temporal distributions—of sulfate and other aerosols, and also collect solar irradiance data for the long-term climate record. The science focus areas served by Glory included: atmospheric composition; carbon cycle, ecosystems, and biogeochemistry; climate variability and change; and water and energy cycles. The US$424 million satellite was lost on 4 March 2011, when its Taurus XL carrier rocket malfunctioned. A subsequent investigation revealed that the fairing system failed to open fully, causing the satellite to reenter the atmosphere at which point it likely broke up and burned. NASA investigators later determined the cause for the launch failure to be faulty materials provided by aluminum manufacturer Sapa Profiles.

== Spacecraft ==
The Glory spacecraft bus uses Orbital Science Corporation's LEOStar bus design, with twin articulated deployable solar panels, 3-axis stabilization, and X-band and S-band RF communications capabilities. The structure consists of an octagonal aluminium space frame and a hydrazine propulsion module containing enough fuel for at least 36 months of on-orbit service. The spacecraft bus also provides payload power; command, telemetry, and science data interfaces, including onboard storage of data; and an attitude control subsystem to support instrument pointing requirements.

== Launch ==
The launch from Vandenberg Air Force Base, near Lompoc, California, aboard a Taurus XL rocket was originally planned for 23 February 2011. It was postponed due to a malfunction in ground support equipment. The next liftoff attempt was 4 March 2011. The Taurus rocket also carried three small CubeSat satellites built by university students in Montana, Colorado and Kentucky, the NASA ELaNa I manifest.

The launch took place on 4 March 2011, at 02:09:43 Pacific Standard Time (10:09:43 UTC) from Vandenberg Air Force Base. The Taurus XL rocket's first three stages functioned as planned, but the nose cone (also known as the payload fairing) failed to separate 2 minutes 58 seconds after the launch. The nose cone covers and protects the satellite during launch and ascent, and is designed to separate and fall away shortly after the launch. Due to the failure of the nose cone to separate, the rocket remained too heavy to reach the correct orbit. According to launch director Omar Baez, the satellite and launcher likely crashed in the southern Pacific Ocean. The failure was estimated to have cost at least $424 million. This only includes the cost of the satellite itself, and not the cost of the launcher and launch services. During the previous failed Taurus XL launch, the vehicle and services were estimated to have cost $54 million.

The previous Taurus XL launch with the Orbiting Carbon Observatory (OCO) in February 2009 also ended in a failure due to failed payload fairing separation. Following the failed OCO mission, Taurus XL launches were put on hold for two years as the rocket's manufacturer Orbital Sciences Corporation tried to fix the payload fairing separation problem, obviously without success. A British OCO scientist said the loss of Glory was a great blow to the NASA Earth science program, especially since the reason for the launch failure was the same as with OCO.

During a news conference shortly after the launch, Rich Straka from Orbital Sciences Corporation said his company was investigating the failure, noting, "there really isn't enough data to say anything more than the fairing didn't separate."

== Scientific instruments ==
Aerosol Polarimetry Sensor (APS)
The Aerosol Polarimetry Sensor (APS) is a continuous scanning sensor that has the capability to collect visible, near infrared, and short-wave infrared data scattered from aerosols and clouds. It is designed to make multi-angle observations of Earth and atmospheric scene spectral polarization and radiance. Objectives: Determine the global distribution of natural and man-made aerosols (black carbons, sulfates, etc.) with accuracy and coverage sufficient for reliable quantification of: the aerosol effect on climate; the anthropogenic component of the aerosol effect; the potential regional trends in natural and man-made aerosols.; Determine the direct impact of aerosols on the radiation budget and its natural and anthropogenic components.; Determine the effect of aerosols on clouds (microphysics and coverage) and its natural and anthropogenic components.; Determine the feasibility of improved techniques for the measurement of black carbon and dust absorption to provide more accurate estimates of their contribution to the climate forcing.; Instrument scientist: Brian Cairns / GSFC
Cloud Camera Sensor Package
The Cloud Camera Sensor Package is a dual-band (blue and near infrared), visible imager utilizing non-scanning detector arrays that are analogous to star trackers but Earth-viewing. It consists of an optical imaging system that provides continuous cross-track coverage over a field of view centered on the APS along-track footprint.
Total Irradiance Monitor (TIM)
The Total Irradiance Monitor (TIM) is an active cavity radiometer that records total solar irradiance. It has four identical radiometers to provide redundancy and to help detect changes in the instrument from exposure to solar radiation. TIM is mounted on a platform that moves the instrument independent of the spacecraft.: Instrument scientist: Greg Kopp / GSFC / University of Colorado

== NASA investigation ==
In 2019 it was announced that NASA Launch Services Program (LSP) investigators have determined the technical root cause for the Taurus XL launch failures of NASA's Orbiting Carbon Observatory (OCO) and Glory missions in 2009 and 2011, respectively: faulty materials provided by aluminium manufacturer, Sapa Profiles, Inc. (SPI). LSP's technical investigation led to the involvement of NASA's Office of the Inspector General and the U.S. Department of Justice (DOJ). The efforts of the DOJ, recently made public, resulted in the resolution of criminal charges and alleged civil claims against SPI, and its agreement to pay US$46 million to the U.S. government and other commercial customers. This relates to a 19-year scheme that included falsifying thousands of certifications for aluminium extrusions to hundreds of customers.

On 24 February 2009, a Taurus XL rocket (Taurus T8) carrying NASA's Orbiting Carbon Observatory (OCO) satellite failed to reach orbit. The Taurus T8 mission failed because the payload fairing did not separate during ascent, causing the rocket to not shed weight. As a result of the extra weight, the Taurus rocket failed to reach orbital velocity, resulting in a total loss of the mission. On 4 March 2011, another Taurus rocket (Taurus T9) carrying NASA's Glory scientific satellite failed to reach orbit. The Taurus T9 mission also concluded in a failure of the payload fairing to separate. The Taurus T8 and T9 missions both reentered Earth's atmosphere resulting in break-up and/or burnup of the rocket and satellite, and any surviving pieces would have been dispersed in the Pacific Ocean near Antarctica. The combined cost of both mission failures was in excess of $700 million.

The Taurus T8 and T9 rockets both used 63-inch diameter payload fairings to cover and protect the spacecraft during ground operations and launch. The payload fairing halves are structurally joined and attached to the rocket using frangible joints. A frangible joint is a structural separation system that is initiated using ordnance. Initiation of the ordnance causes the ligament of the frangible joint extrusion to fracture, allowing the two payload fairing halves to be separated and subsequently jettisoned from the Taurus rocket. The frangible joints for T8 and T9 were made and assembled together, at the same time. The T8 and T9 frangible joint extrusions were manufactured by Sapa Profiles, Inc. (SPI) in its Technical Dynamics Aluminum (TDA) plant, in Portland, Oregon.
