= Geosat =

U.S. Navy Earth observation satellite

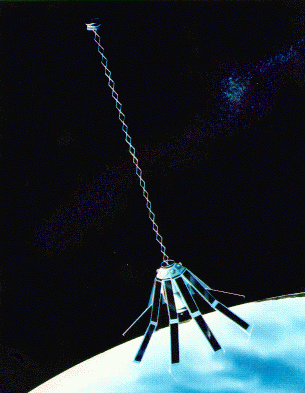
- Artist's interpretation of the Geosat satellite
- Mission type: Earth science
- Operator: United States Navy
- COSPAR ID: 1985-021A
- SATCAT no.: 15595
- Mission duration: 5 Years

Spacecraft properties
- Dry mass: 635.0 kilograms (1,399.9 lb)

Start of mission
- Launch date: March 13, 1985, 02:00 UTC
- Rocket: Atlas E OIS
- Launch site: Vandenberg SLC-3W

End of mission
- Deactivated: January 1990

Orbital parameters
- Reference system: Geocentric
- Regime: LEO
- Semi-major axis: 7,146.2 kilometres (4,440.4 mi)
- Eccentricity: 0.00398
- Perigee altitude: 757 kilometres (470 mi)
- Apogee altitude: 814 kilometres (506 mi)
- Inclination: 108.0596 degrees
- Period: 100.6 minutes
- RAAN: 309.0682 degrees
- Argument of perigee: 276.8275 degrees
- Mean anomaly: 131.8715 degrees
- Mean motion: 14.37442186
- Epoch: 9 December 2013
- Revolution no.: 50565

The GEOSAT (GEOdetic SATellite) was a U.S. Navy Earth observation satellite, launched on March 12, 1985 into an 800 km, 108° inclination orbit, with a nodal period of about 6040 seconds. The satellite carried a radar altimeter capable of measuring the distance from the satellite to sea surface with a relative precision of about 5 cm. Its 18-month initial phase was a classified Geodetic Mission with a near-23-day repeat that was intended to replicate the orbit of the short-lived Seasat. After this, the satellite was maneuvered into a near-17-day exact repeat for oceanographic research.

== Mission ==
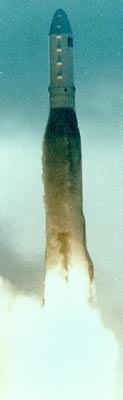
Atlas-E OIS (41E) launching Geosat

The Geosat Geodetic Mission goal was to provide information on the marine gravity field. If the ocean surface were at rest, and no forces such as tides or winds were acting on it, the water surface would lie along the geoid. To first order, the Earth shape is an oblate spheroid. Subsurface features such as seamounts create a gravitational pull, and features such as ocean trenches create lower gravity areas. Spatial variations in gravity exert influence on the ocean surface and thereby cause spatial structure in the geoid. The deviations of the geoid from the first order spheroid are on the order of ± 100m. By measuring the position of the water surface above the Earth center, the geoid is observed, and the gravity field can be computed through inverse calculations.

== Exact Repeat Mission ==
After the Geodetic Mission (GM) concluded 30 September 1986, GEOSAT's scientific Exact Repeat Mission (ERM) began on November 8, 1986 after being maneuvered into a 17.05 day, 244 pass exact repeat orbit that was more favorable for oceanographic applications. When the ERM ended in January 1990, due to failure of the two on-board tape recorders, more than three years of ERM data were collected and made available to the scientific community.

Once the GM goal had been reached, the satellite still had a useful life. An opportunity existed to observe the next order physical process that affects the ocean surface. Currents, tides and wind forcing all create changes in water levels. While there are extreme waves and events (tsunamis and hurricane surge), typical ocean features would be considered large if the water level change caused by them were 1 m. Most areas of the world experience features of typical amplitude of 20 cm. The ERM established the satellite in an exact repeat orbit. The satellite would orbit the Earth, and after 17.05 days the satellite would return to the same point. The satellite was actively controlled through thrust maneuvers to maintain the exact repeat orbit to within 1 km of the predefined ground track. In this manner, the satellite could observe long term changes at the points along the ground track.

== Declassification ==
The U.S. Navy declassified parts of the Geodetic Mission data in 1990 that covered a doughnut-shaped area of ocean that surrounds Antarctica between 60 and 72 degrees south latitude. In 1992, further parts of the Geodetic Mission data over the oceans south of 30 degrees south were released. The GEOSAT data for the entire global sea surface was declassified in July 1995 after the competition of the geodetic phase of ESA ERS-1 mission. These data were subsequently widely used to estimate ocean bathymetry along with additional satellite altimeters.

== GFO ==
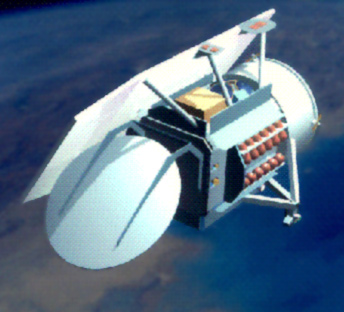
GFO (Geosat Follow-On) Satellite

The successor to GEOSAT is the Geosat Follow-On (GFO) mission, launched 10 February 1998 by a Taurus rocket from Vandenberg AFB. GFO carried a water vapor radiometer as well as a radar altimeter, and operated in the same orbit as GEOSAT's Exact Repeat Mission. In addition, GFO carried a GPS receiver (which was never used operationally), Doppler receivers, and laser retro-reflectors for orbit determination. GFO was scheduled for retirement on December 31, 2008, but in late September 2008, the deteriorating state of the spacecraft resulted in a decision to accelerate the shutdown. Despite a series of system failures aboard the spacecraft, controllers were able to successfully lower GFO to a disposal orbit and shut it down on November 25, 2008. A successor mission, named GFO-2, was planned for launch in 2014, and would have featured a dual-band altimeter, instead of the single-band altimeter on the previous spacecraft. GFO-2 was cancelled by the U.S. Navy on 30 June 2010.

== See also ==
- Gladys West
