= Minotaur-C =

Four stage, solid fuel launch vehicle

Minotaur-C (Taurus)
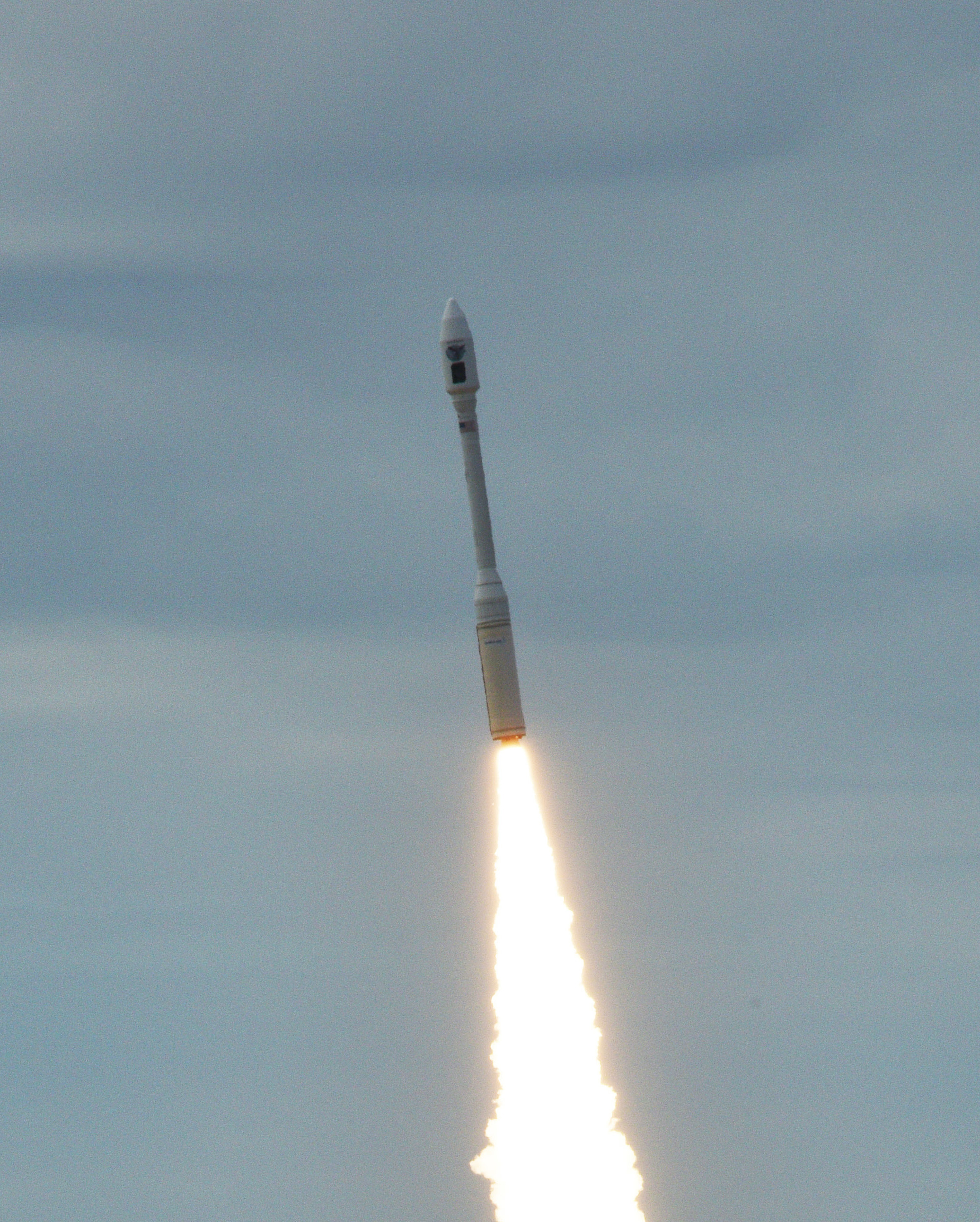
- Minotaur-C launching its return-to-flight in 2017
- Function: Small-lift launch vehicle
- Manufacturer: Orbital Sciences (1994–2015); Orbital ATK (2015–2018); Northrop Grumman (2018–present)
- Country of origin: United States
- Cost per launch: US$40−50 million (2017)

Size
- Height: 27.9 m (92 ft)
- Diameter: 2.35 m (7 ft 9 in)
- Mass: 73,000 kg (161,000 lb)
- Stages: 4

Capacity

Payload to LEO
- Mass: 1,458 kg (3,214 lb)

Payload to SSO
- Mass: 1,054 kg (2,324 lb)

Associated rockets
- Family: Minotaur
- Based on: Pegasus

Launch history
- Status: Retired
- Launch sites: Vandenberg, SLC-576E
- Total launches: 10
- Success(es): 7
- Failure: 3
- First flight: 13 March 1994
- Last flight: 13 October 2017

First stage – Castor 120
- Maximum thrust: 1,606.6 kN (361,200 lb_{f})
- Specific impulse: 286 s (2.80 km/s)
- Burn time: 83 seconds
- Propellant: HTPB / Al

Second stage – Orion 50ST
- Maximum thrust: 484.9 kN (109,000 lb_{f})
- Specific impulse: 285 s (2.79 km/s)
- Burn time: 73 seconds
- Propellant: HTPB / Al

Third stage – Orion 50T
- Maximum thrust: 118.2 kN (26,600 lb_{f})
- Specific impulse: 292 s (2.86 km/s)
- Burn time: 73 seconds
- Propellant: HTPB / Al

Fourth stage – Orion 38
- Maximum thrust: 34.57 kN (7,770 lb_{f})
- Specific impulse: 293 s (2.87 km/s)
- Burn time: 65 seconds
- Propellant: HTPB / Al

Minotaur-C (Minotaur Commercial), formerly known as Taurus or Taurus XL, was a four stage solid fueled launch vehicle built in the United States by Orbital Sciences (now Northrop Grumman) and launched from SLC-576E at California's Vandenberg Air Force Base. It is based on the air-launched Pegasus rocket from the same manufacturer, utilizing a "zeroth stage" in place of an airplane. The Minotaur-C is able to carry a maximum payload of around 1,458 kilograms (3,214 lb) into a low Earth orbit (LEO).

First launched in 1994, it has successfully completed seven out of a total of ten military and commercial missions. Three of four launches between 2001 and 2011 ended in failure, including the 24 February 2009 launch of the Orbiting Carbon Observatory mission and the 4 March 2011 launch of the Glory mission, which resulted in losses totalling US$700 million for NASA (excluding the cost of the rockets themselves). The Taurus launch vehicle was subsequently rebranded in 2014 as Minotaur-C, which incorporates new avionics based on those used by the Minotaur family of rockets. After a six years pause, the rocket successfully returned to flight in 2017 as Minotaur-C.

== Stages ==
The Minotaur-C's first stage, an Orbital ATK Castor 120, is based on a Peacekeeper ICBM first stage. Stages 2 and 3 are Orion-50s (like the Pegasus but without wings), and stage 4 is an Orion 38, which is also used as a third stage on the Pegasus.

=== Numbering system ===
Different configurations are designated using a four-digit code, similar to the numbering system used on Delta rockets. The first digit denotes the type of first stage being used, and whether the second and third stages use a standard or "XL" configuration. The second digit denotes the diameter of the payload fairing. The third digit denotes the type of fourth stage. The fourth digit denotes an optional fifth stage, so far unused.

Number	First digit			Second Digit	Third Digit	Fourth Digit
Number	First stage	Second stage	Third stage	Fairing diameter	Fourth stage	Fifth stage
0	—N/a			—N/a	—N/a	None
1	TU-903	Orion 50ST	Orion 50T	1.60 m (63 in)	Orion 38	—N/a
2	Castor-120	Orion 50ST	Orion 50T	2.34 m (92 in)	—N/a	—N/a
3	Castor-120	Orion 50SXLT	Orion 50XLT	—N/a	Star-37FM	Star-37

== Launch history ==
Flight No.	Date/Time (UTC)	Vehicle type	Launch site	Payload	Result
1	13 March 1994; 22:32	ARPA Taurus	Vandenberg, SLC-576E	STEP Mission 0 and DARPASAT	Success
2	10 February 1998; 13:20	Commercial Taurus, 92" payload fairing and 63" dual payload attach fitting	Vandenberg, SLC-576E	GFO and Orbcomm (satellite 11 and 12)	Success
3	3 October 1998; 10:04	Air Force Taurus Configuration, 63" fairing, Peacekeeper Stage 0	Vandenberg, SLC-576E	Space Technology Experiment (STEX) for National Reconnaissance Office (NRO)	Success
4	21 December 1999; 07:13	Model 2110, 63" fairing, Castor 120 Stage 0	Vandenberg, SLC-576E	KOMPSAT and ACRIMSAT	Success
5	12 March 2000; 09:29	Air Force Taurus Configuration, 63" fairing, Peacekeeper Stage 0	Vandenberg, SLC-576E	Multispectral Thermal Imager (MTI)	Success
6	21 September 2001; 18:49	Model 2110, 63" fairing, Castor 120 Stage 0	Vandenberg, SLC-576E	Orbview-4 / QuikTOMS	Failure
7	20 May 2004; 17:47	Model 3210, 92" fairing, Castor 120 Stage 0	Vandenberg, SLC-576E	ROCSAT-2	Success
8	24 February 2009; 09:55	Model 3110, 63" fairing, Castor 120 Stage 0	Vandenberg, SLC-576E	Orbiting Carbon Observatory	Failure
9	4 March 2011; 10:09	Model 3110, 63" fairing, Castor 120 Stage 0	Vandenberg, SLC-576E	Glory, KySat-1, Hermes, and Explorer-1 [PRIME]	Failure
10	31 October 2017; 21:37	Model 3210, 92" fairing, Castor 120 Stage 0	Vandenberg, SLC-576E	SkySat x 6, Flock-3m x 4	Success

== Launch failures ==
=== Orbview-4 ===
On 21 September 2001, a Taurus XL rocket failed during launch. When the second stage ignited at T+83 seconds, a nozzle gimbal actuator drive shaft seized for approximately 5 seconds causing loss of control. The vehicle recovered and continued to fly the mission profile, but failed to reach a stable orbit and reentered near Madagascar.

=== Orbiting Carbon Observatory ===
On 24 February 2009, a Taurus XL rocket failed during the launch of the US$270 million Orbiting Carbon Observatory spacecraft. Liftoff occurred successfully at 09:55 UTC from Vandenberg Air Force Base, but data received at a later stage of the flight suggested that the fairing failed to separate. The rocket did not reach orbit, owing to the extra weight of the fairing. Launch vehicle and services for OCO are estimated at US$54 million. The replacement satellite, Orbiting Carbon Observatory 2, was launched on 2 July 2014 aboard a Delta II rocket.

=== Glory ===
On 4 March 2011, a Taurus XL rocket failed again during the launch of NASA's US$424 million Glory climate change monitoring satellite. In total, the last two failures of the Taurus XL have resulted in payload losses worth $700 million. The reason for the failure was the same as with OCO: the payload fairing failed to separate, although the rocket's manufacturer Orbital Sciences Corporation had spent the last two years trying to fix the problem and had made several design changes to the fairing separation system. Ronald Grabe, manager of Orbital Sciences Corporation, which also built the Glory satellite itself, said the employees of his companies are "pretty devastated" because of the latest failure. The fairing was built by the Vermont Composites company, and the frangible rail pyrotechnic separation system was built by the Ensign-Bickford Company. A NASA MIB panel concluded that the failure was most likely caused by a section of the frangible rail somewhere near the nose cap failing to separate. While a root cause could not be identified, two likely causes were identified: the rubber charge holder in the frangible rail slumping due to launch acceleration and random vibration, or a failure of the frangible rail system due to it operating outside the environment for which it was tested.

A continued investigation eventually revealed that sub-standard parts provided by Sapa Profiles, Inc. (SPI) with falsified test results were the likely cause of both of the OCO and Glory fairing failures.

== Ground-Based Interceptor ==
The upper stages of the Minotaur-C are used by the boost vehicle of the Ground-Based Interceptor, the anti-ballistic missile component of the U.S. Missile Defense Agency's Ground-Based Midcourse Defense system.

== See also ==
- Comparison of orbital launchers families
- Antares, an Orbital ATK rocket with a liquid first stage and a modified Castor 120 solid rocket as a second stage. Originally named Taurus II.
- Official fact sheet (2019)
