= Long Wall (aerospace company) =

American company

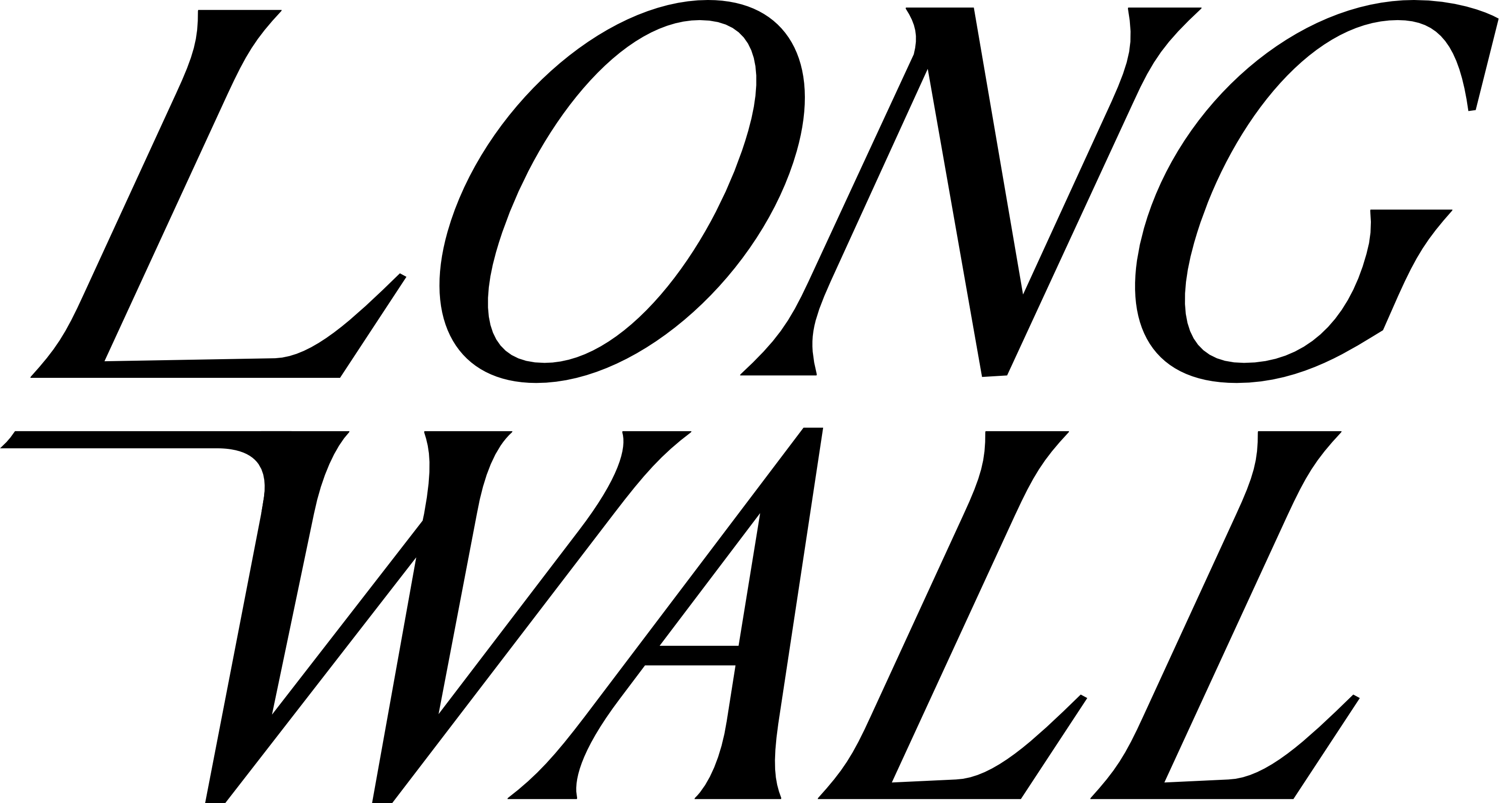
- Company type: Private
- Industry: Aerospace
- Founded: August 2017
- Founder: Dan Piemont; Harry O'Hanley
- Headquarters: Long Beach, California, United States
- Key people: Dan Piemont (CEO); Harry O'Hanley (Executive); Kevin Sagis (Chief Product Officer / Enterprise Chief Engineer)
- Number of employees: 100 (2021)
- Website: lwall.com ablspacesystems.com (former)

Long Wall (formerly ABL Space Systems) is an American aerospace company, based in Long Beach, California (originally from El Segundo, California), that manufactures deployable launch vehicles and infrastructure for missile defense, formerly for sending commercial small satellites into orbit. The company manufactures its components in the United States.

Long Wall manufactures RSX, a launch vehicle used for flight testing and threat replication, and Ironwood, a rapidly deployable ground support equipment system.

== History ==
Long Wall was founded as ABL Space Systems in 2017 by Harry O'Hanley and Dan Piemont, former SpaceX and Morgan Stanley employees.

In 2018, Long Wall signed a lease with Camden County, Georgia, for future operations in Spaceport Camden.

In 2019, the company signed with Spaceport America in New Mexico to locate testing operations and facilities there. As of October 2022, the company makes no mention of this location on their facility list.

In 2021 Long Wall leased facilities at the Port of Long Beach formerly occupied by Sea Launch.

In March 2023, the company earned a $60 million contract from the U.S. Space Force and U.S. Air Force Strategic Funding Increase program. The contract was for the company to build out its 'responsive launch' operational capacity.

In 2024 the company had raised more than $500 million for the development and operation of their rocket. The sum was made up from both venture funding and from secured launch contracts with major clients.

In November 2024, prior to completing a successful commercial launch the company announced it was pivoting its focus towards military applications, potentially leveraging their previous launch vehicles and engines to be used in missile defense technologies.

In February 2025, CEO Dan Piemont announced in a blog post that the company would rebrand to Long Wall, a name inspired by the Long Walls in Ancient Athens, and focus on developing missile defense systems and hypersonic flight test vehicles.

== See also ==
- Rocket Lab – New Zealand and American public spaceflight company
- Relativity Space – American launch vehicle manufacturer
- Firefly Aerospace – American aerospace company
