= STEX =

Science Technology Experiments
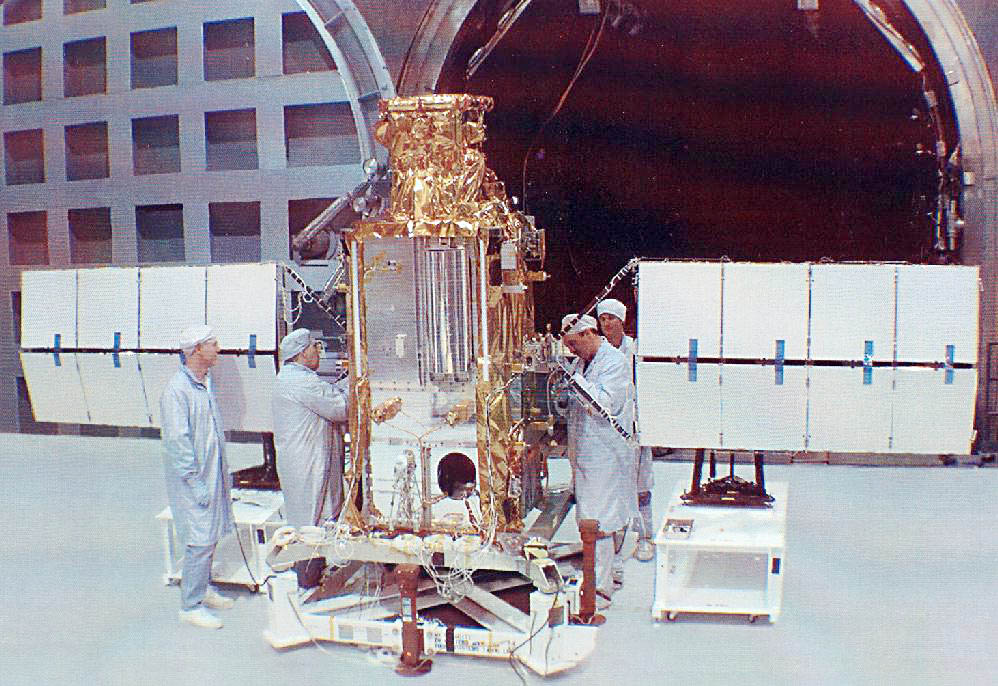
- STEX during ground-testing
- Names: STEX; USA 140; NROL-8
- Mission type: Technology demonstration
- Operator: NRO
- COSPAR ID: 1998-055A
- SATCAT no.: 25489

Spacecraft properties
- Manufacturer: Lockheed Martin
- Launch mass: 539.4 kg (1,189 lb)

Start of mission
- Launch date: 10:04:49, October 3, 1998 (UTC)
- Rocket: Taurus (rocket)
- Launch site: Vandenberg AFB

Space Technology Experiments, or STEX, also known as NRO Launch 8 or NROL-8, was an experimental National Reconnaissance Office (NRO) satellite built by Lockheed Martin. It was launched on 3 October 1998. One of the experiments was ATEx (Advanced Tether Experiment), which was deployed on 22 January 1999, and subsequently jettisoned.

== ATEx ==
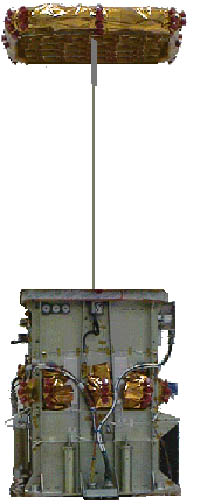
Advanced Tether Experiment (ATEx) with partially deployed upper end-body

The Advanced Tether Experiment (ATEx), was a follow on to the TiPS experiment, designed and built by the Naval Center for Space Technology, flown as one of the experiments on STEX. ATEx had two end masses connected by a polyethylene tether that was intended to deploy to a length of 6 km, and was intended to test a new space tether deployment scheme, new tether material, active control, and survivability. ATEx was deployed on 16 January 1999 and ended 18 minutes later after deploying only 22 m of tether. The jettison was triggered by an automatic protection system designed to save STEX if the tether began to stray from its expected departure angle, which was ultimately caused by excessive slack tether. As a result of the deployment failure, none of the desired ATEx goals were achieved. ATEx is now tracked as a separate object as USA 141 or COSPAR ID 1998-055C.
