= Technology for Autonomous Operational Survivability =

Technology for Autonomous Operational Survivability (TAOS)
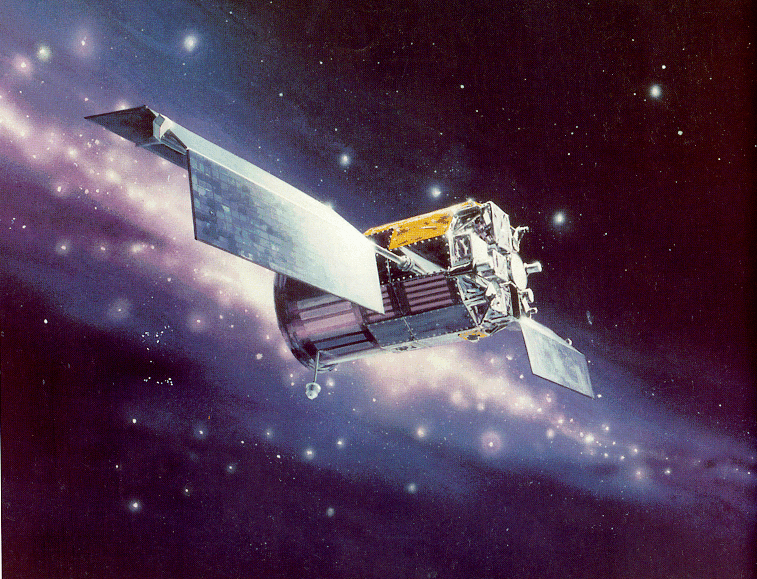
- Names: Space Test Experiment Platform 0 (STEP-0); USA 101
- Mission type: Technology demonstrator
- Operator: AFRL
- COSPAR ID: 1994-017A
- SATCAT no.: 23030

Spacecraft properties
- Bus: LEOStar
- Manufacturer: Orbital Sciences
- Launch mass: 502 kg (1,107 lb)

Start of mission
- Launch date: 22:32, March 13, 1994 (UTC)
- Rocket: Taurus 1110
- Launch site: Vandenberg AFB

Technology for Autonomous Operational Survivability (TAOS) (also known as Space Test Experiment Platform 0 (STEP 0) and USA101) was a satellite developed by the US Air Force's Phillips Laboratory (now part of the Air Force Research Laboratory Space Vehicles Directorate) to test technology for autonomous operation of spacecraft.

The TAOS mission was operated by heritage Space Test and Development Wing and the 1st Space Operations Squadron.
