= Hydro Extruded Solutions =

Hydro Extruded Solutions (business area within Hydro ASA)
- Industry: Aluminium
- Founded: 1963
- Headquarters: Oslo, Norway
- Key people: Egil Hogna (EVP)
- Products: building products heat transfer tubing profiles extrusion aluminium
- Number of employees: 22,400 (Hydro Extruded Solutions)
- Website: www.hydro.com/en-US

Hydro Extruded Solutions is a manufacturer of extruded aluminium profiles. Hydro has the largest global aluminium extrusion-based operation in the world, counting 100 production sites in more than 40 countries, and has 22,400 employees. Hydro's head office is located in Oslo, Norway. In 2015, it was debarred and excluded from all contracting with the US Federal Government in response to a 19-year scheme to falsify material testing and certification records, which directly resulted in the loss of two NASA satellites, totaling more than US$700 million.

== History ==
Skandinaviska Aluminiumprofiler AB (Scandinavian Aluminum Profiles) set up its first extrusion plant in Vetlanda in 1963, with sales of aluminum profiles from the Swedish plant beginning in 1967. The Norwegian corporation Orkla Group acquired Sapa in 2005 and delisted the company from the Stockholm Stock Exchange.

Sapa and Alcoa engaged in a joint venture in 2007, making it one of the world's largest extrusion companies. One year later, in December 2008, Alcoa and Orkla executed an asset swap transaction. In this transaction, Orkla took over Alcoa's soft aluminium alloy extrusion business, which was then organized under the Sapa name, and became the sole owner of Sapa

In 2009 the company acquired 10 North American extrusion plants that belonged to Indalex. At the time of the purchase, Indalex was under bankruptcy protection. The acquisition covered six plants in the United States and four in Canada.

In October 2012, Orkla and the Norwegian company Norsk Hydro announced that they had agreed to combine the aluminium extrusion businesses of Sapa and Hydro into a new 50/50 joint venture, which would keep the Sapa name. After having received approvals from all relevant authorities, the joint venture transaction was closed and a new company, Sapa AS, was established on September 1, 2013. Hydro ASA acquired Sapa in October 2017, when Sapa was renamed Hydro Extruded Solutions and organized as a new business area.

In 2019 a NASA investigation of two Taurus rocket launch failures, which resulted in the loss of 700 million dollars' worth of payload, determined that the root cause was the use of defective parts manufactured and fraudulently certified by Sapa Profiles, Inc. (SPI).
