= 166 Squadron =

166 Squadron may refer to:

- 166 Squadron (Israel)
- No. 166 Squadron RAF, United Kingdom
- 166th Aero Squadron, United States Army Air Service
- 166th Fighter Squadron, United States Air Force
- 166th Air Refueling Squadron, United States Air Force
- VMM-166, United States Marine Corps
