= 200 Squadron =

200 Squadron may refer to:

- 200 Squadron (Israel)
- No. 200 Squadron RAF, United Kingdom
- 200th Aero Squadron, Air Service, United States Army
- 200th Airlift Squadron, United States Air Force
- VPB-200, United States Navy

== See also ==
- Kampfgeschwader 200
