= 161 Squadron =

161 Squadron or 161st Squadron may refer to:

- No. 161 Squadron RAF, a unit of the Royal Air Force
- No. 161 Squadron RCAF, a unit of Royal Canadian Air Force
- 161 Squadron (Israel) a unit of the Israeli Air Force
- 161st Intelligence Squadron, a unit of the United States Air Force
- VFA-161, a strike fighter unit of the United States Navy
- VMM-161, a tiltrotor transport unit of the United States Marine Corps
