= Palmachim Airbase =

Israeli airbase and spaceport

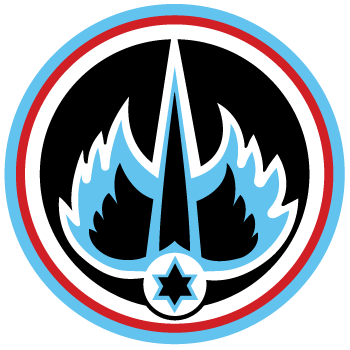
Palmachim Israeli Air Force Base Air Force Base 30
- בָּסִיס חֵיל-הַאֲוִויר פַּלְמַחִים
- Palmachim, Central District in Israel
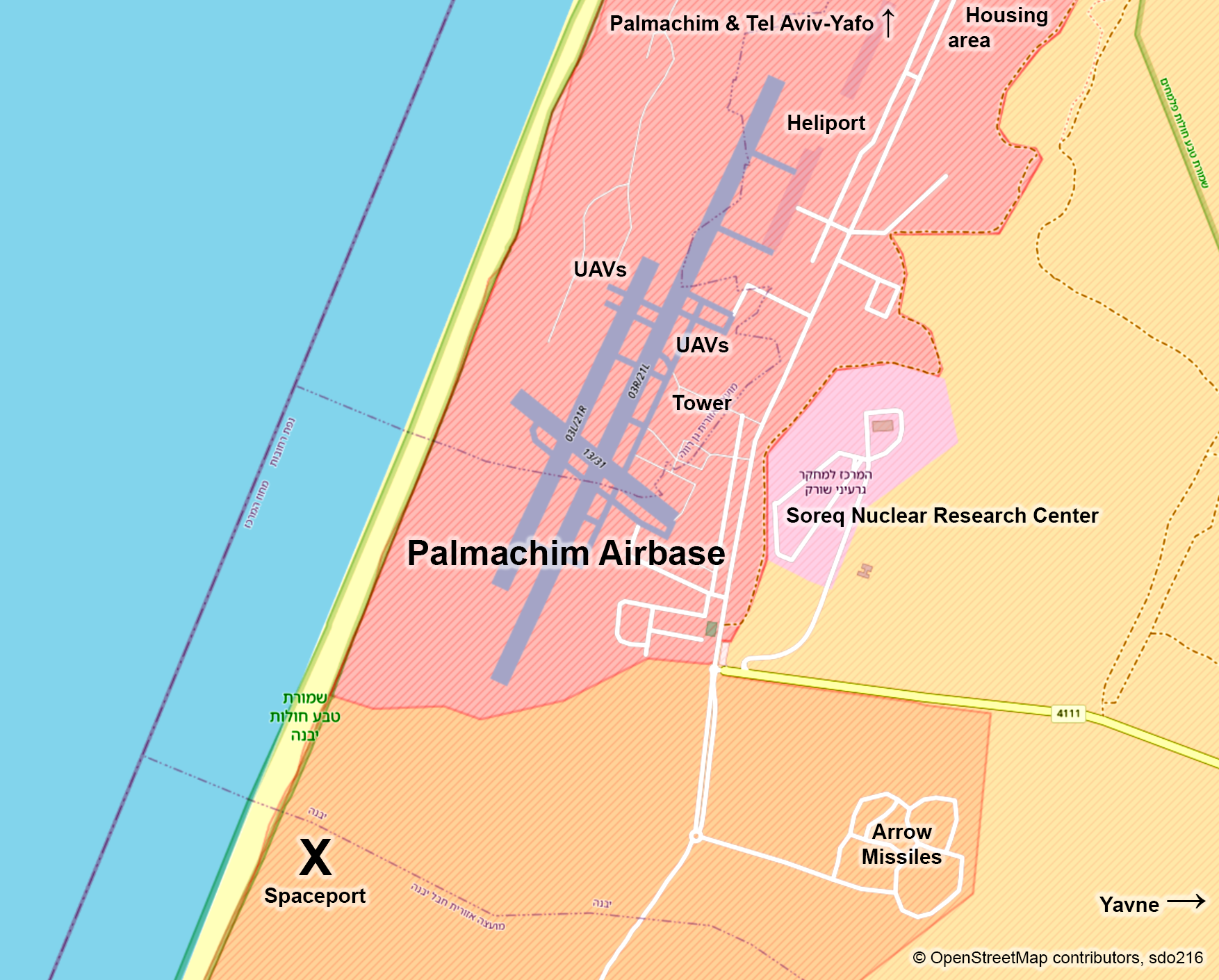

Site information
- Type: Airbase & Spaceport
- Owner: Israel Defense Forces
- Operator: Israeli Air Force; Israel Space Agency

Location
- Shown within Israel Palmachim Airbase (Israel)
- Coordinates: 31°53′52″N 34°41′26″E

Site history
- Built: End of 1960s

Airfield information
- Identifiers: ICAO: LLPL
- Elevation: 10 metres (33 ft) AMSL
Runways
| Direction | Length and surface |
|---|---|
| 03R/21L | 2,403 metres (7,884 ft) Asphalt |
| 03L/21R | 1,480 metres (4,856 ft) Asphalt |
| 13/31 | 803 metres (2,635 ft) Asphalt |

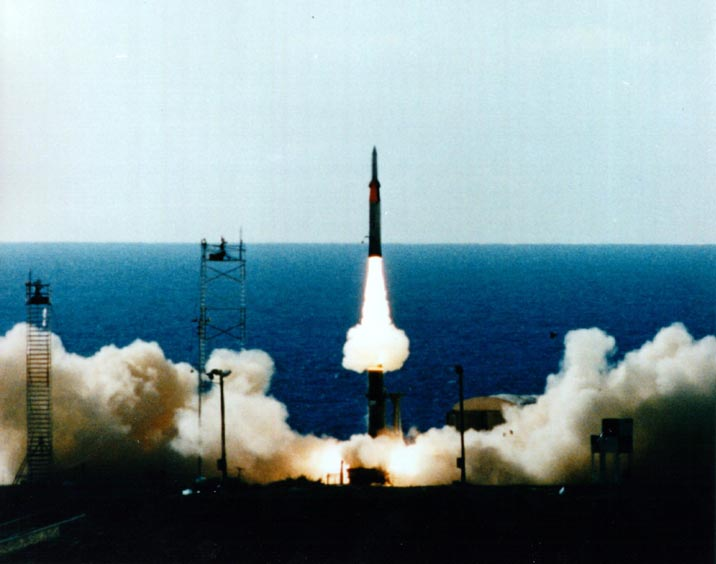
Test of an Arrow 2 missile at the Palmachim launchpad in 1996 near the seashore

Palmachim Airbase (Hebrew: בָּסִיס חֵיל-הַאֲוִויר פַּלְמַחִים, ICAO: LLPL) is an Israeli Air Force (IAF) base and spaceport, which the IAF and the Israel Space Agency (ISA) operate jointly. It is located west of the city of Yavne on the Mediterranean coast, 12 km south of the Gush Dan metropolitan area with Tel Aviv, named after the Kibbutz Palmachim a few hundred meters to the north. There are no fighter jets stationed there, but transport helicopters, UAVs and a battery of Arrow defense missiles southeast of it.

== History ==
During the British Mandate for Palestine, the Royal Air Force had several training grounds in the area of today's Palmachim Airbase, among others for paratroopers. The Israeli airbase was finally established in the second half of the 1960s by (later commander of the IAF) Benny Peled. The area was initially used to test rockets and projectiles by the 151 Squadron for missile testing, with the test items being fired towards the sea.

=== Helicopters ===
- In 1975, the 160 Squadron "First Cobra" was established with new AH-1 Cobra Tzefa attack helicopters (see photo in gallery below) at Tel Nof Airbase.
- In 1979, the 160 Squadron "First Cobra (later Southern Cobra)" with its Cobra attack helicopters was relocated from Tel Nof to Palmachim.
- In 1981, the 124 Squadron "Rolling Sword" with Bell 212 Iroquois Anafa helicopters (see photo in gallery below) moved from Tel Nof to Palmachim also.
- In 1985, the 161 Squadron "Northern Cobra" was launched as the second Cobra squadron at Palmachim, both in the northern area of the base.

Because of their location on the airbase they were then called the "Northern Cobra" and "Southern Cobra" Squadron (see map also). In 2013, both Cobra squadrons were finally decommissioned.

The 124 Squadron "Rolling Sword" was founded in the 1950s at Tel Nof Airbase as the first helicopter squadron in Israel and flew, among others, the Sikorsky S-55 from 1956 and the slightly larger Sikorsky S-58 from 1958. In 1962, the then German Defense Minister Franz Josef Strauß sold 24 modern S-58 to Israel, which were then supplemented and finally replaced by Bell 205 (UH-1D/H) helicopters from the end of the 1960s, as some S-58 had been lost in the Six-Day War in 1967.

However, as the single-engine Bell 205 increasingly had problems in the desert climate – and many did not survive the Yom Kippur War in 1973 – they were replaced by Bell 212 (UH-1N) helicopters, which had two turbines and were therefore more powerful and more durable. In 1981, the helicopter squadron moved to Palmachim with its Bell 212 machines.

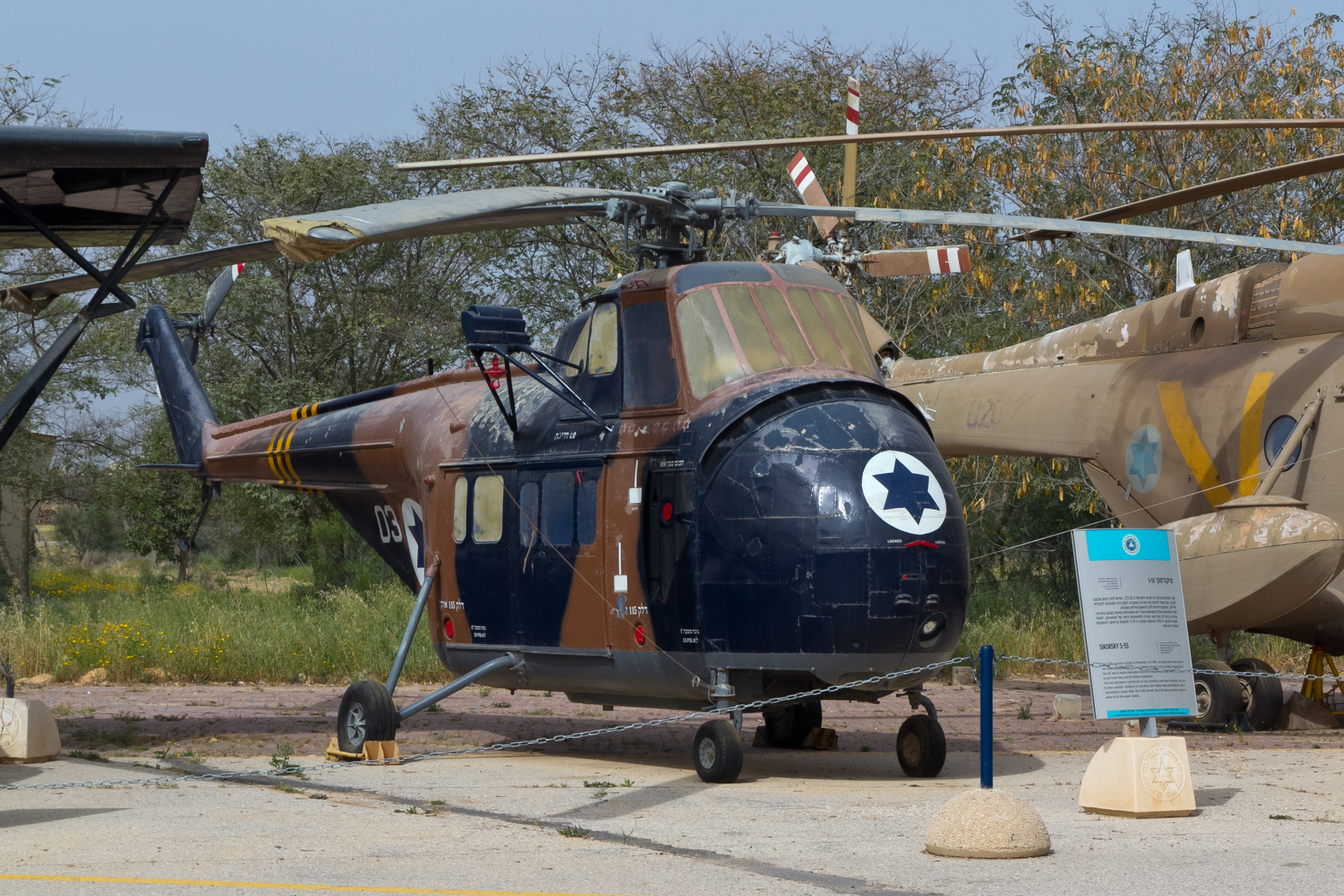
A Sikorsky S-55 of the IAF from the 1950s at the Israeli Air Force Museum near Hatzerim Airbase

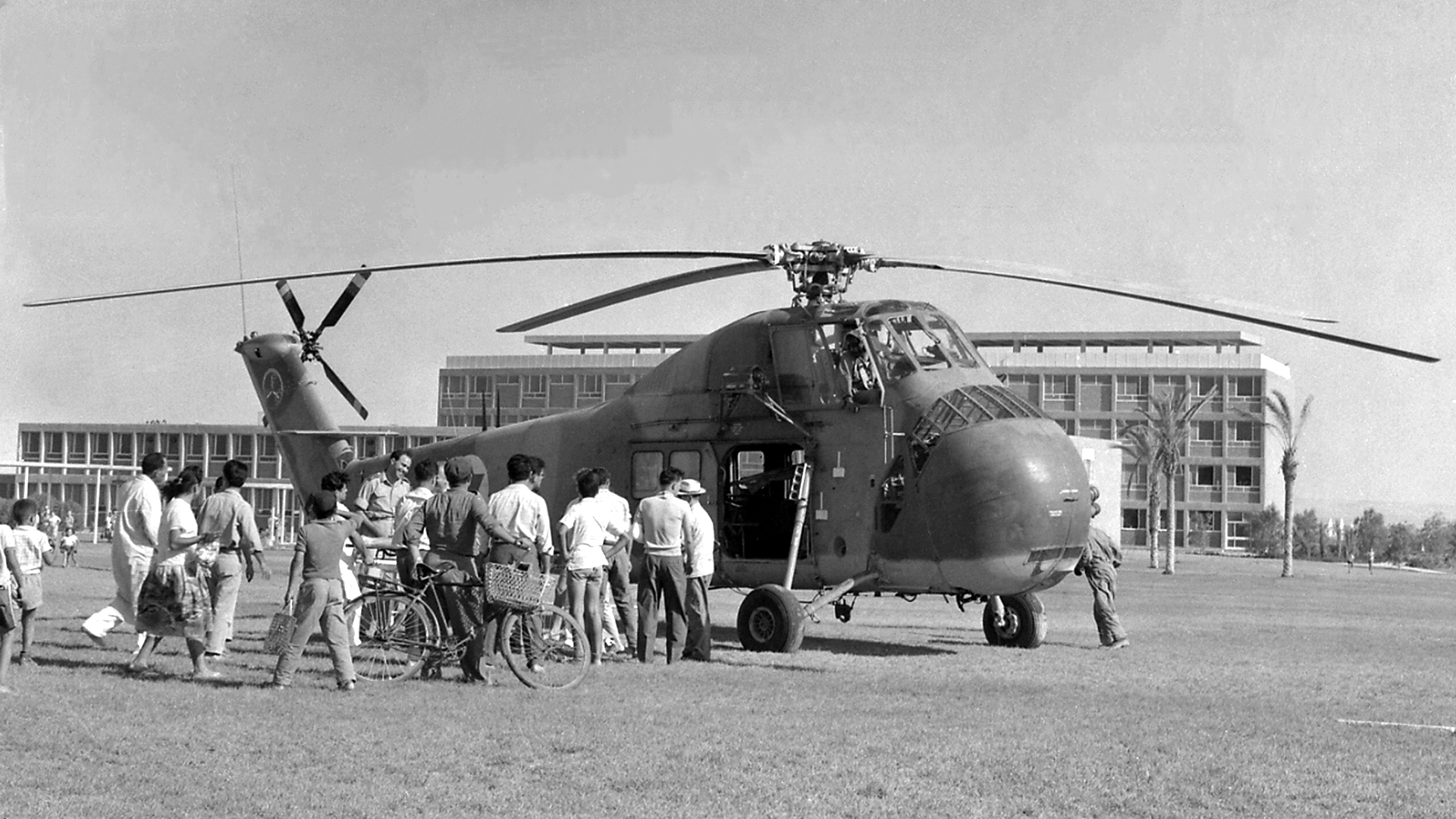
A Sikorsky S-58 of 124 Squadron "Rolling Sword" at Beersheba in 1962, based on Tel Nof Airbase

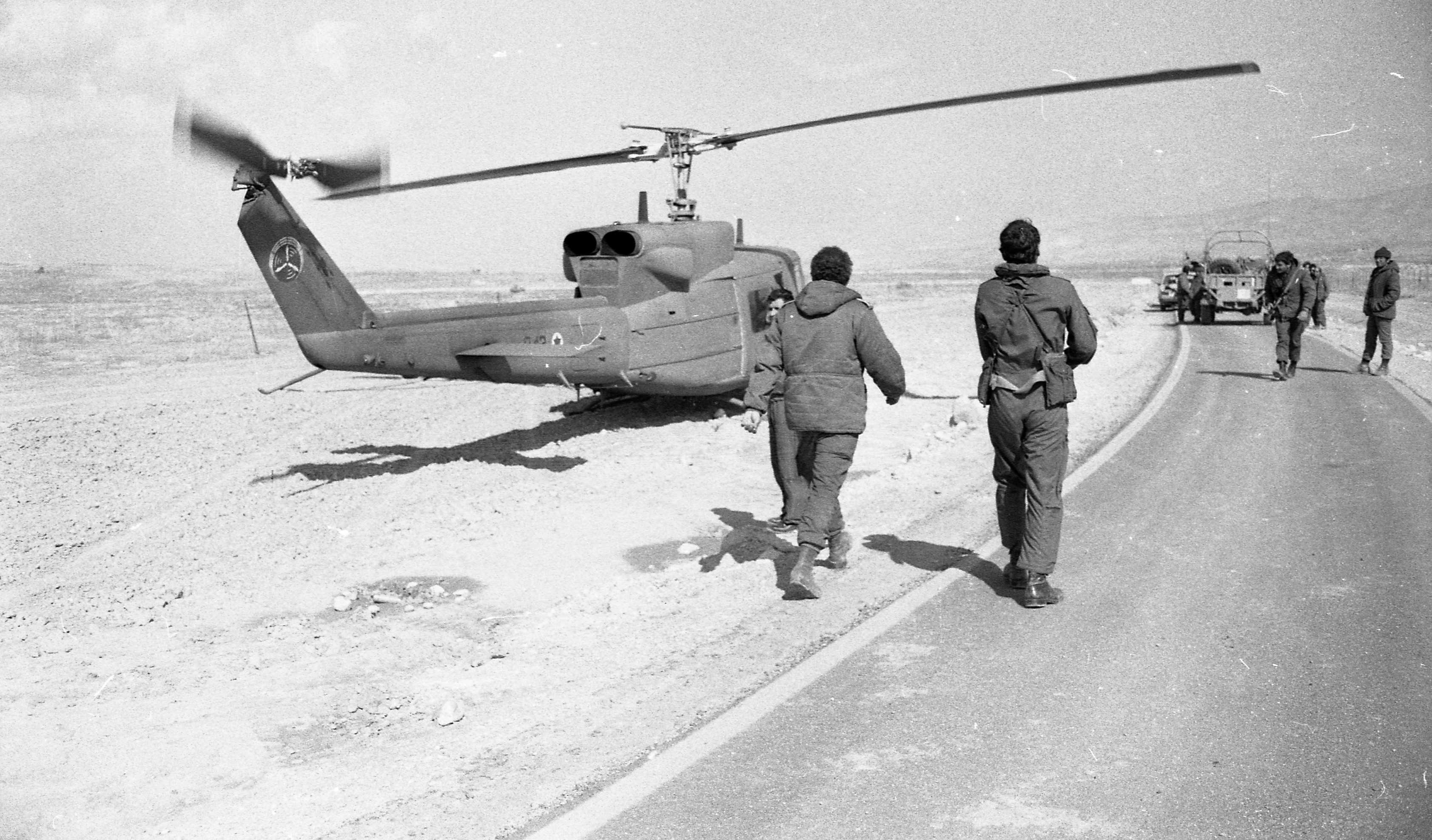
A Bell 212 Iroquois Anafa (2 turbines) of 124 Squadron "Rolling Sword" from Palmachim Airbase in 1982

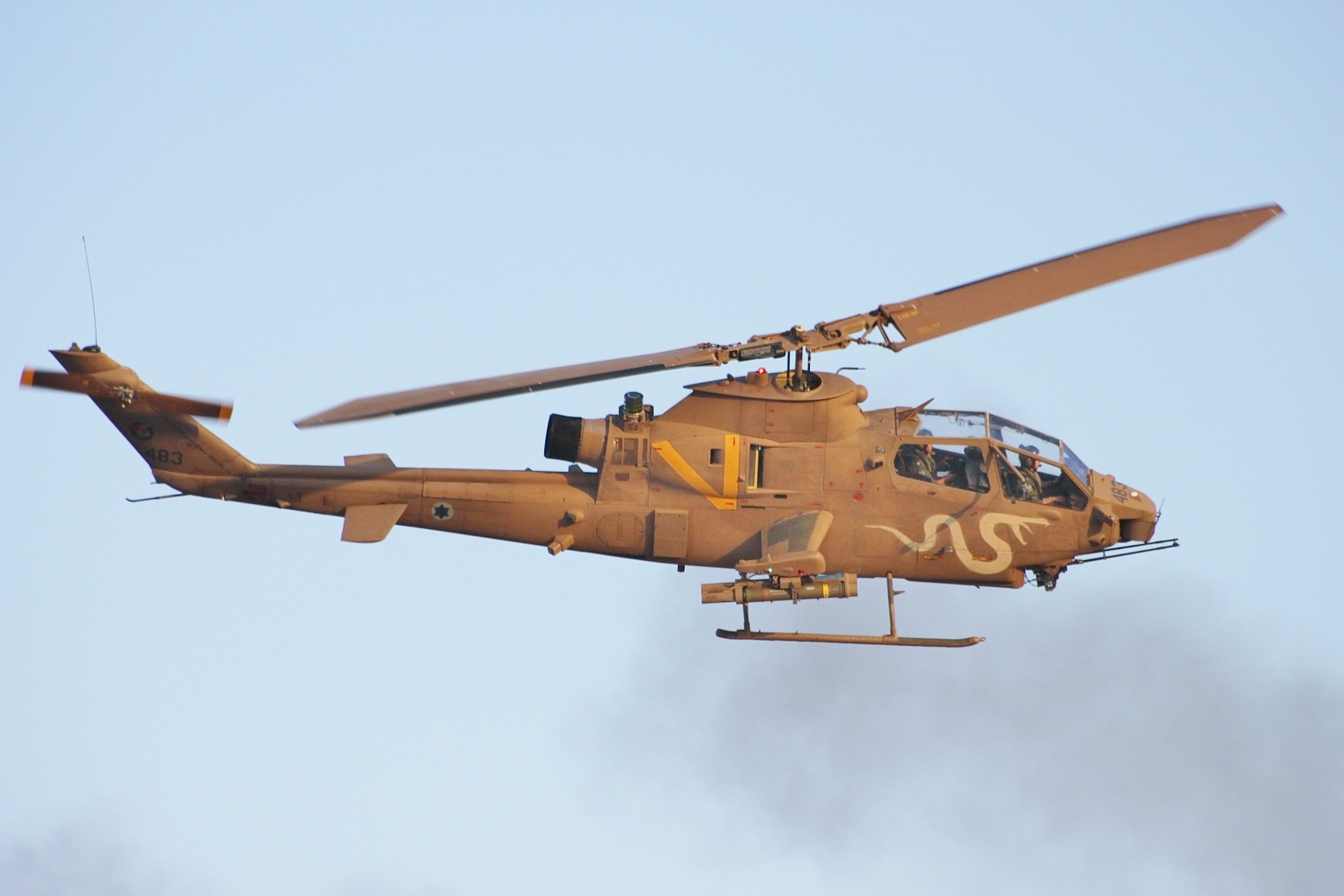
Have been based on Palmachim from 1979 until 2013: AH-1 Cobra Tzefa attack helicopters

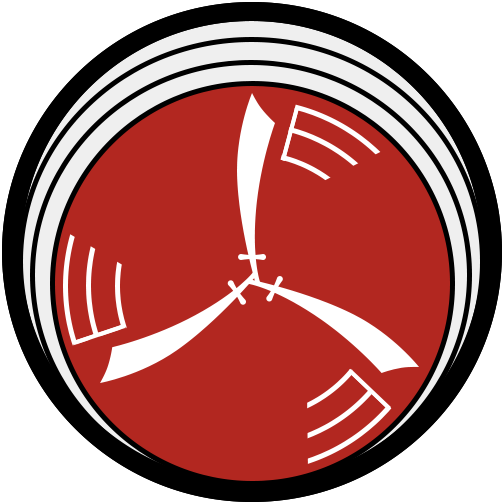
Current symbol of 124 Squadron "Rolling Sword"

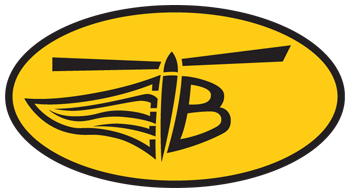
Current symbol of 123 Squadron "Desert Birds"
- In 1994, 124 Squadron "Rolling Sword" on Palmachim received its first UH-60 Black Hawk Yanshuf transport helicopters. Later the squadron also received the civil version, called S-70A, for military use.
- In 2002, 123 Squadron "Desert Birds" was re-established at Hatzerim Airbase with new UH-60 Black Hawk Yanshuf transport helicopters.
- In 2015, 123 Squadron "Desert Birds" moved from Hatzerim to Palmachim Airbase.

There are two squadrons of UH-60 Black Hawk Yanshuf stationed at the base (see also under "Units"). These are used for troop transport as well as for rescue missions by Unit 669 - heliborne Combat Search and Rescue (CSAR), which is based both on Tel Nof Airbase with its CH-53D Sea Stallion Yasʿur there and on Palmachim with its Black Hawk.

During 2026, 193 Squadron "Defenders of the West" will reopen at Palmachim. It was closed on 31 August 2025, at Ramat David Airbase, and at that time flew several Eurocopter AS565 Panther Atalef maritime patrol, maritime surveillance, and SAR helicopters for the Israeli Navy. Upon reopening, it will be equipped with eight SH-60 Seahawk, which were purchased by the IAF and Navy from the US Navy stocks in 2015. These were extensively converted and equipped with Israeli systems.

=== UAVs ===
Israel was an early adopter of drone development and became one of the leading nations in this field alongside the USA. The Palmachim Airbase played a special role in this. The 200 Squadron "First UAV" was founded here in 1971 and initially used US drones such as the Ryan Firebee Mabat and the Northrop BQM-74 Chukar Telem. But in the course of the 1970s, Israel developed its own models such as the Tadiran Mastiff, the IAI Scout Oriole and later the AAI RQ-2 Pioneer and IAI Searcher Hugla, all of which were used for reconnaissance flights – especially over contested areas.

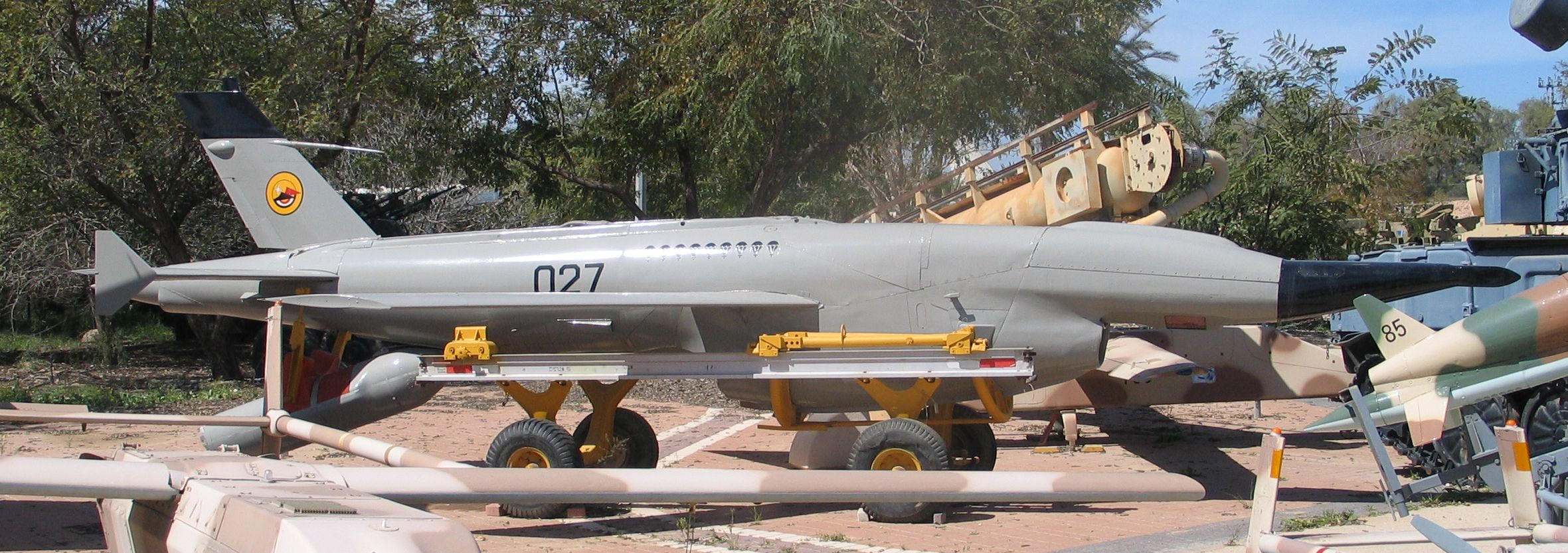
The Ryan Firebee Mabat UAV of 200 Squadron "First UAV" (see tail) was in use from 1971, Hatzerim in 2006

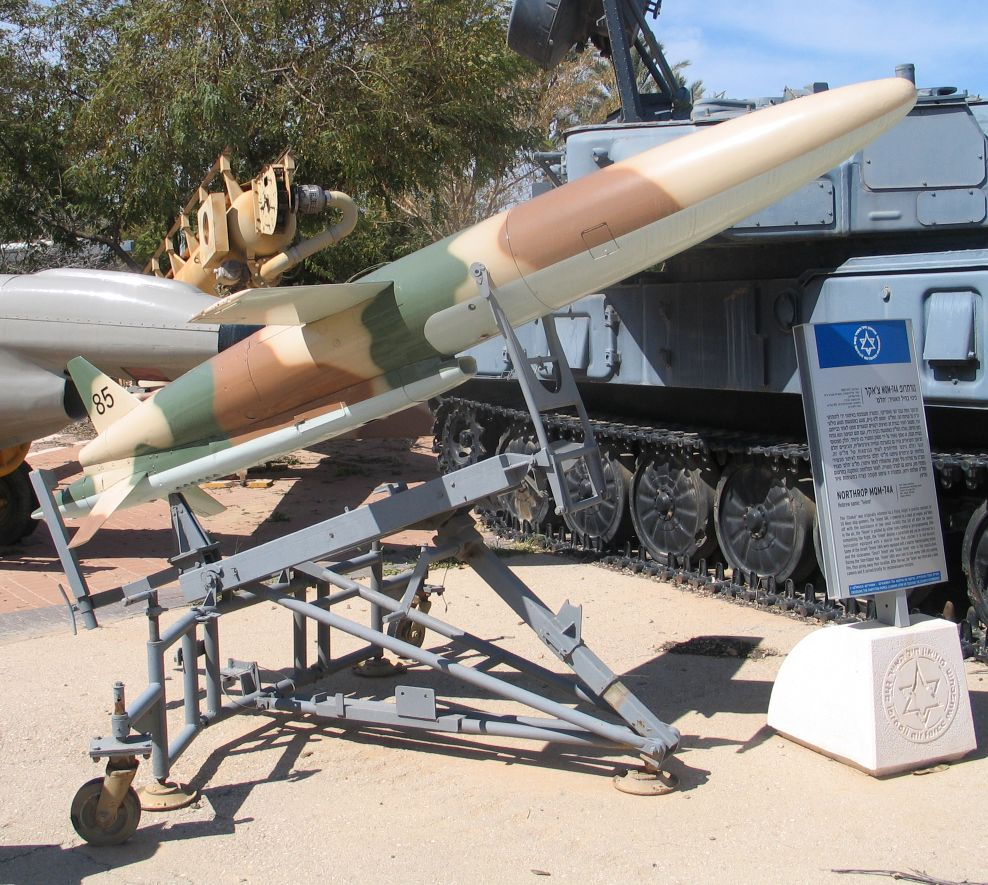
The Northrop BQM-74 Chukar Telem UAV of 200 Squadron "First UAV", also in use from 1971, here in 2006

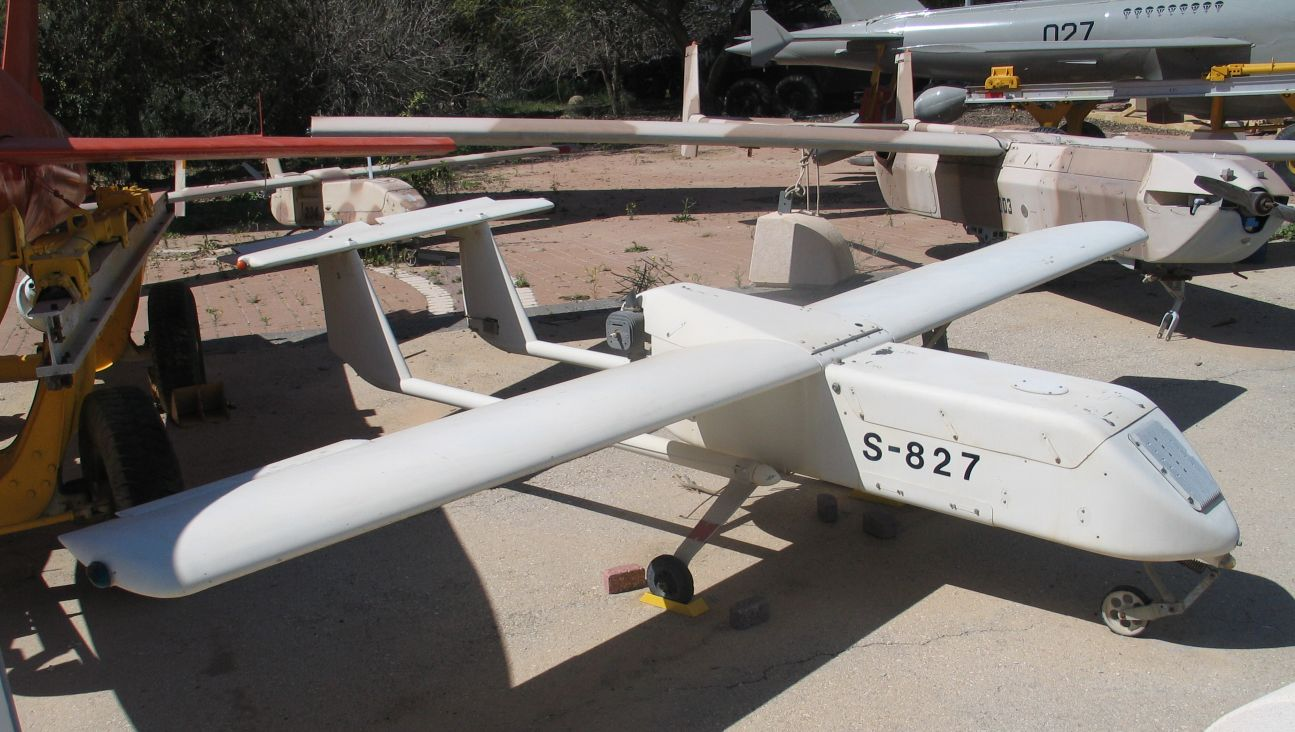
Tadiran Mastiff UAV of 200 Squadron "First UAV", now in the IAF Museum near Hatzerim Airbase in 2006

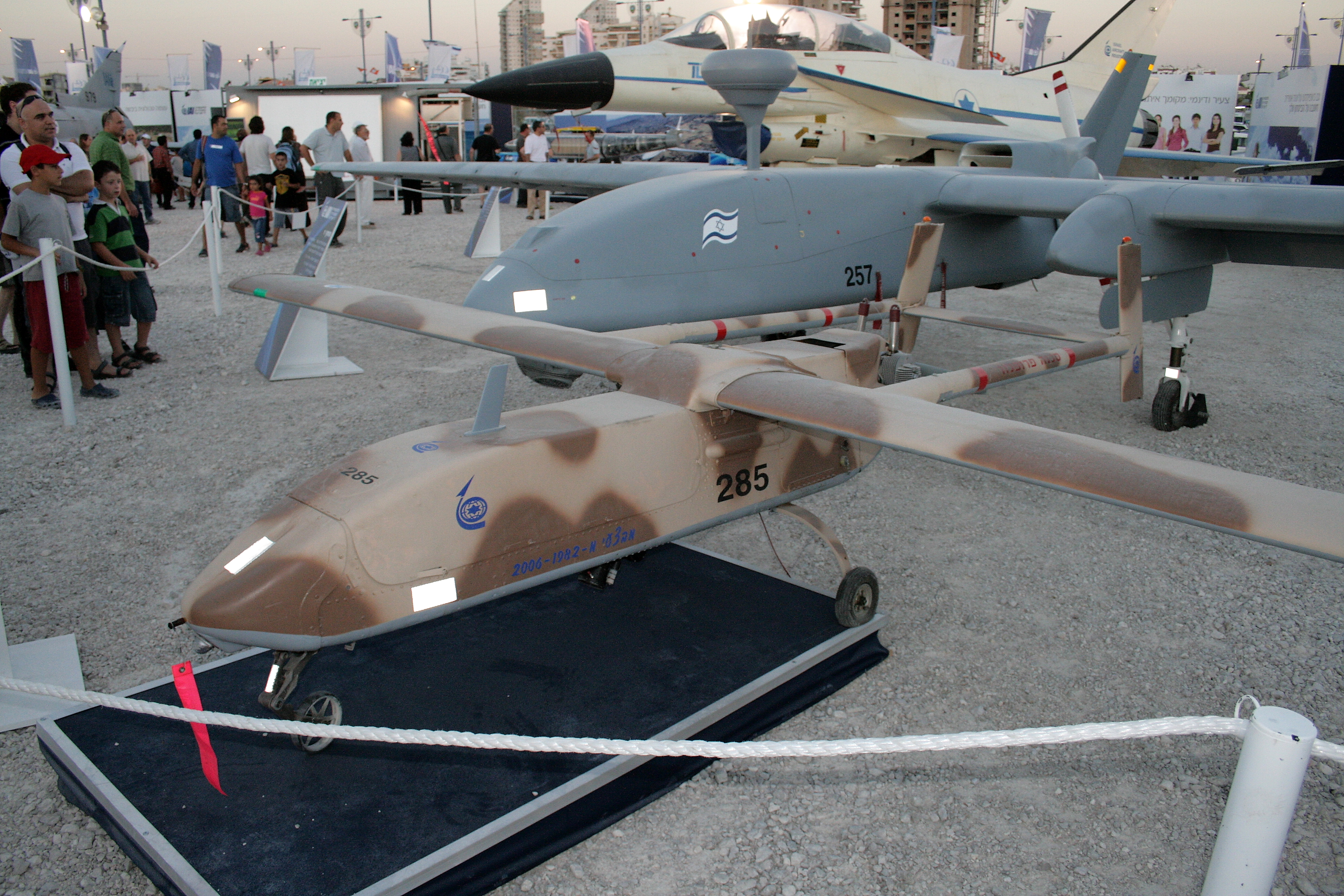
An IAI Scout Oriole UAV (front), a further development of the Mastiff, at an exhibition in 2008

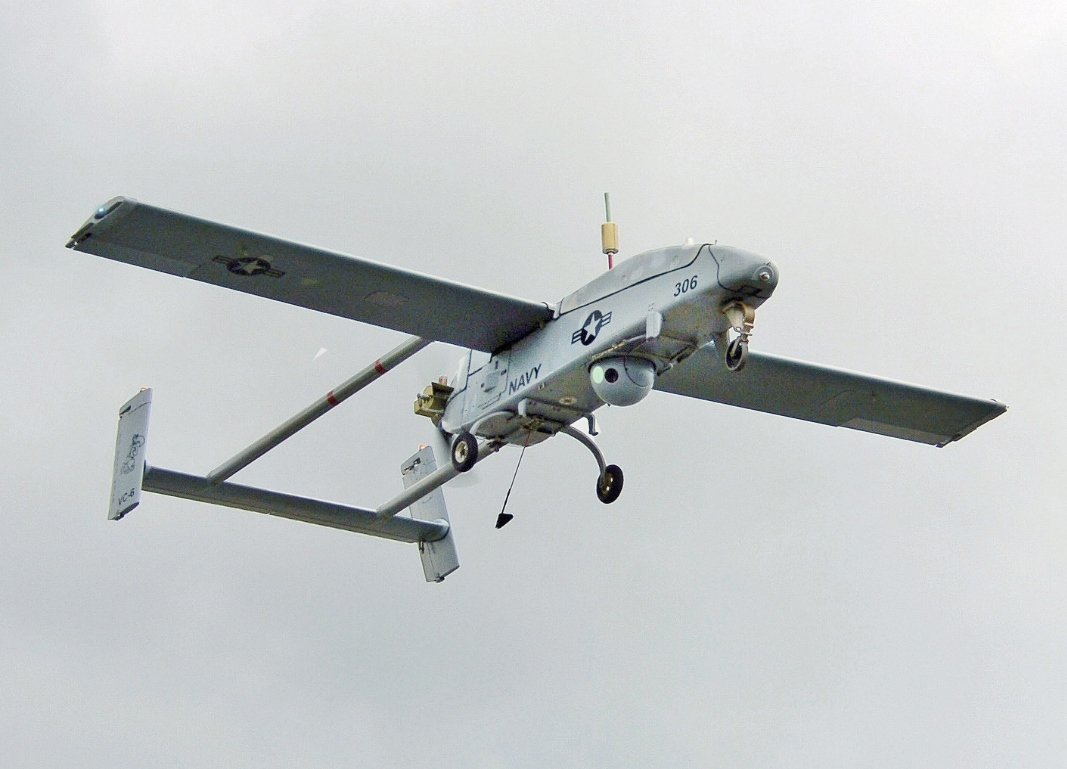
The AAI RQ-2 Pioneer UAV of the US Navy in 2005, was co-developed by IAI and used by the IAF also

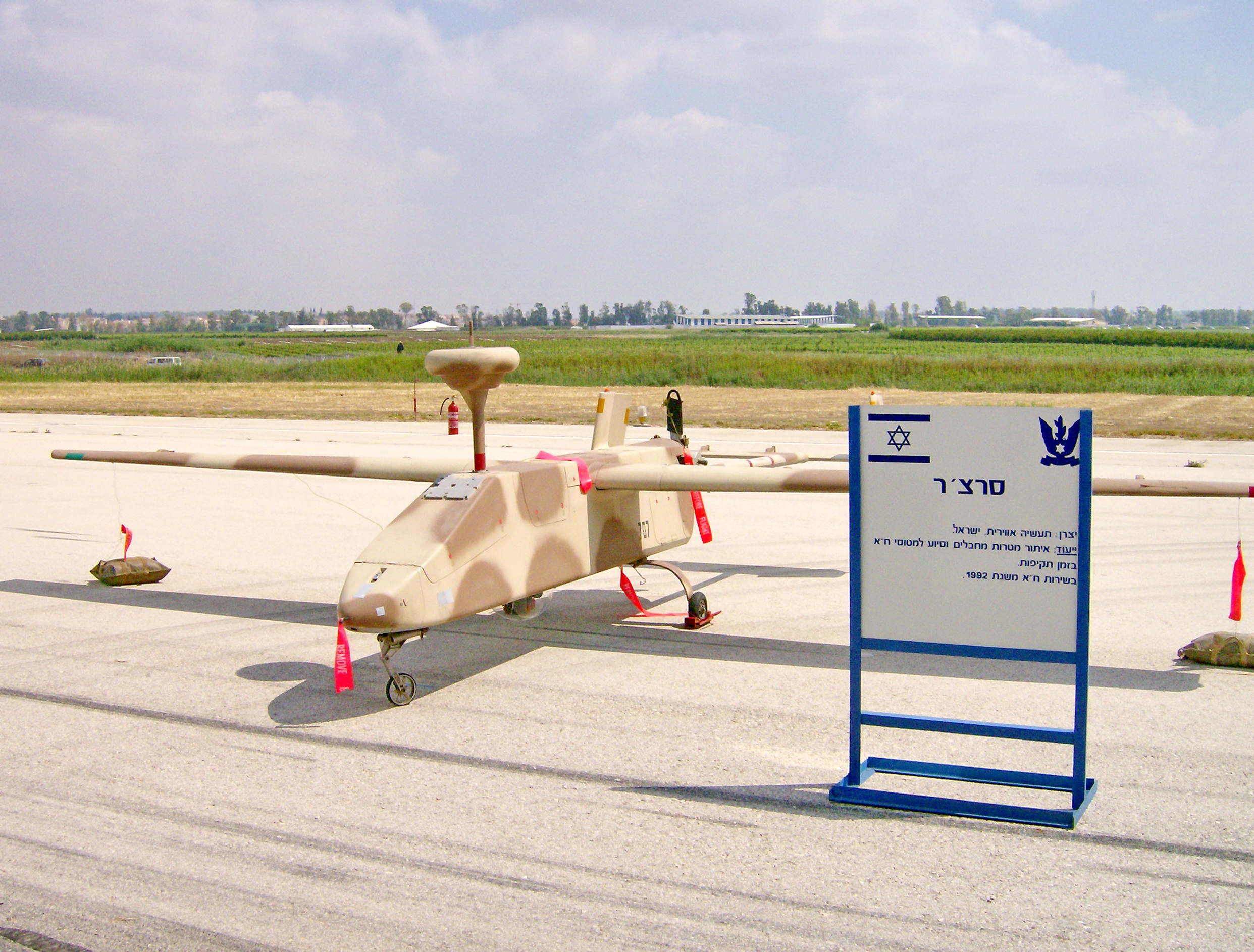
An IAI Searcher Hugla UAV at Tel Nof Airbase on Independence Day of Israel in April 2007

From the mid-1990s, testing and introduction of the IAI Heron 1 Shoval UAV began, shortly afterwards of the Elbit Hermes 450 Zik and finally from 2009 of its successor Hermes 900 Kochav, each by its own squadron. From this point onwards, UAVs were no longer used solely for reconnaissance flights by the IAF, but also for firing guided missiles, something which was not officially confirmed for a long time. But the USAF was able to do it from 1995 onwards with its MQ-1 Predator, and so did Israel not long after with its UAVs.

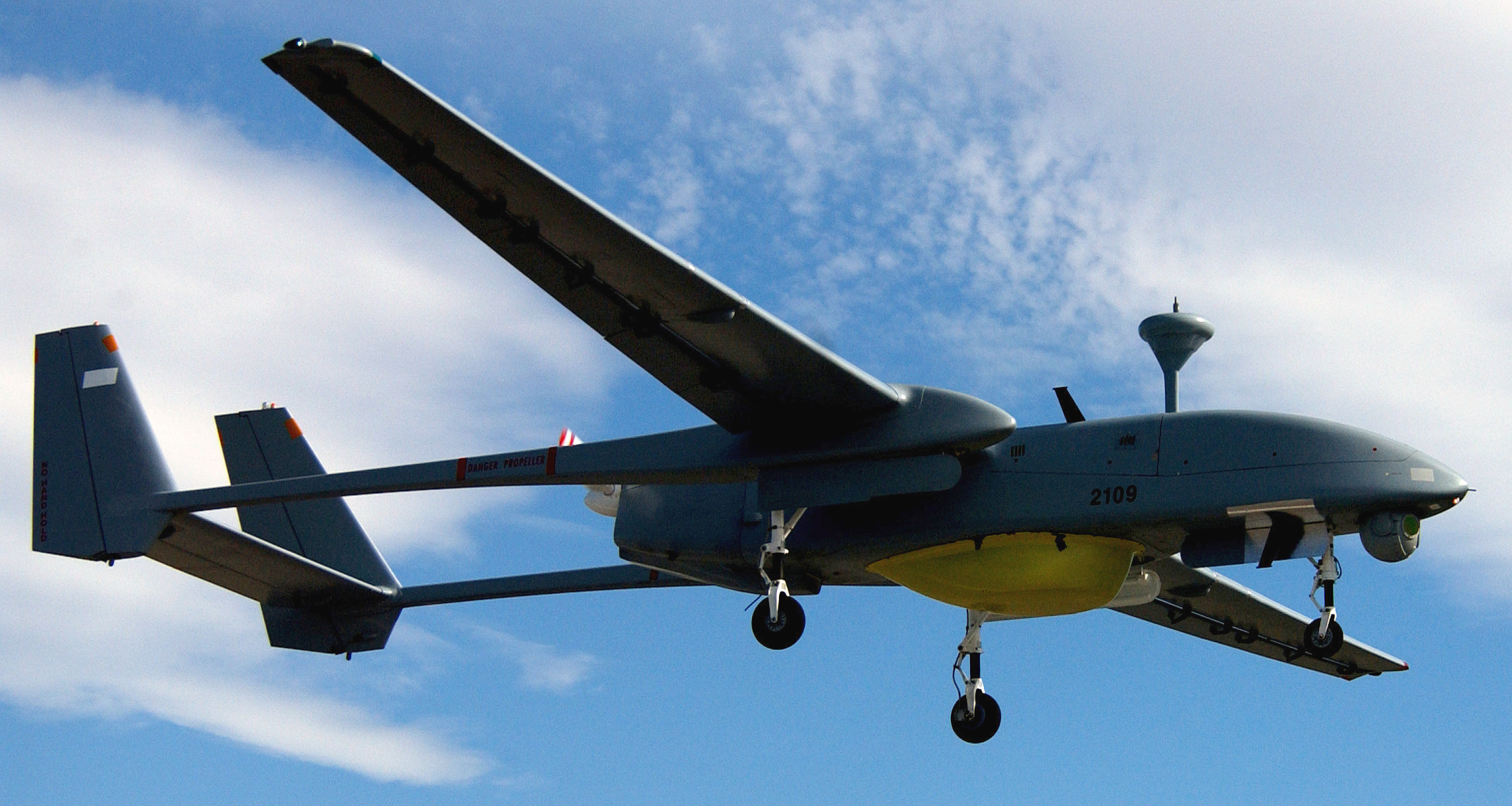
Based here from mid 1990s until 2023: Heron 1 Shoval UAVs

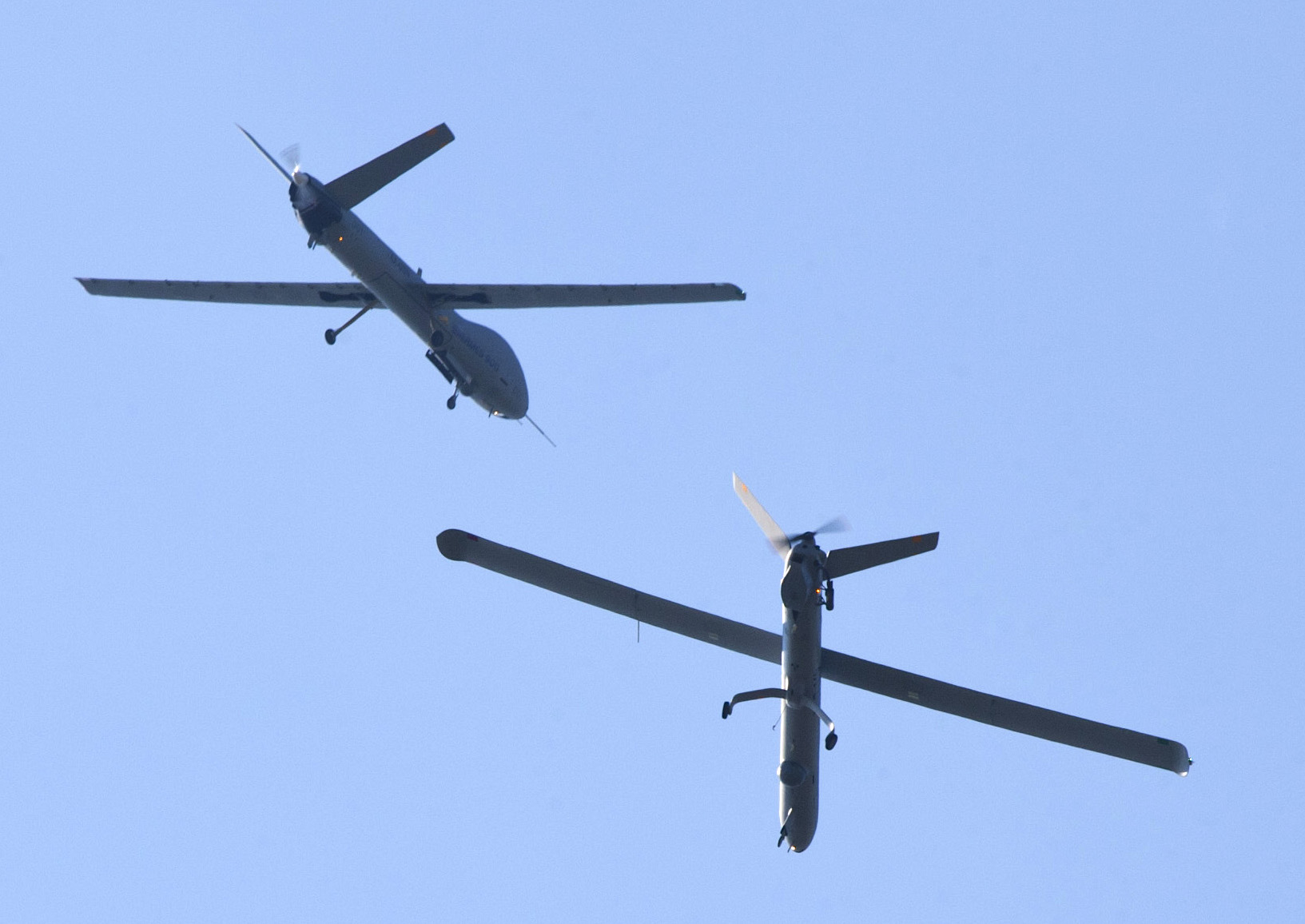
Hermes 450 Zik (below) and Hermes 900 Kochav UAVs in formation

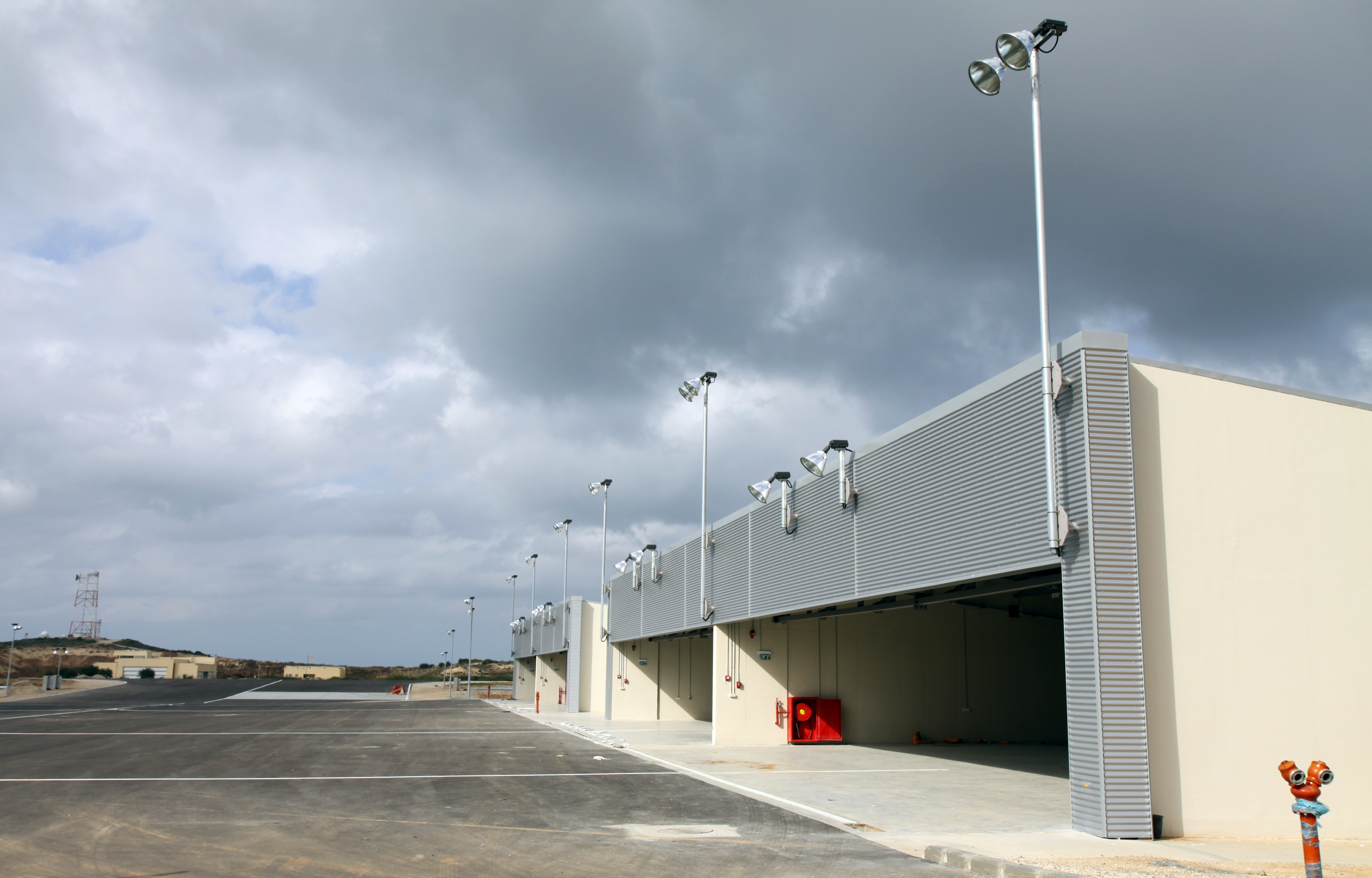
Newly built UAV hangars at Palmachim Airbase in 2010

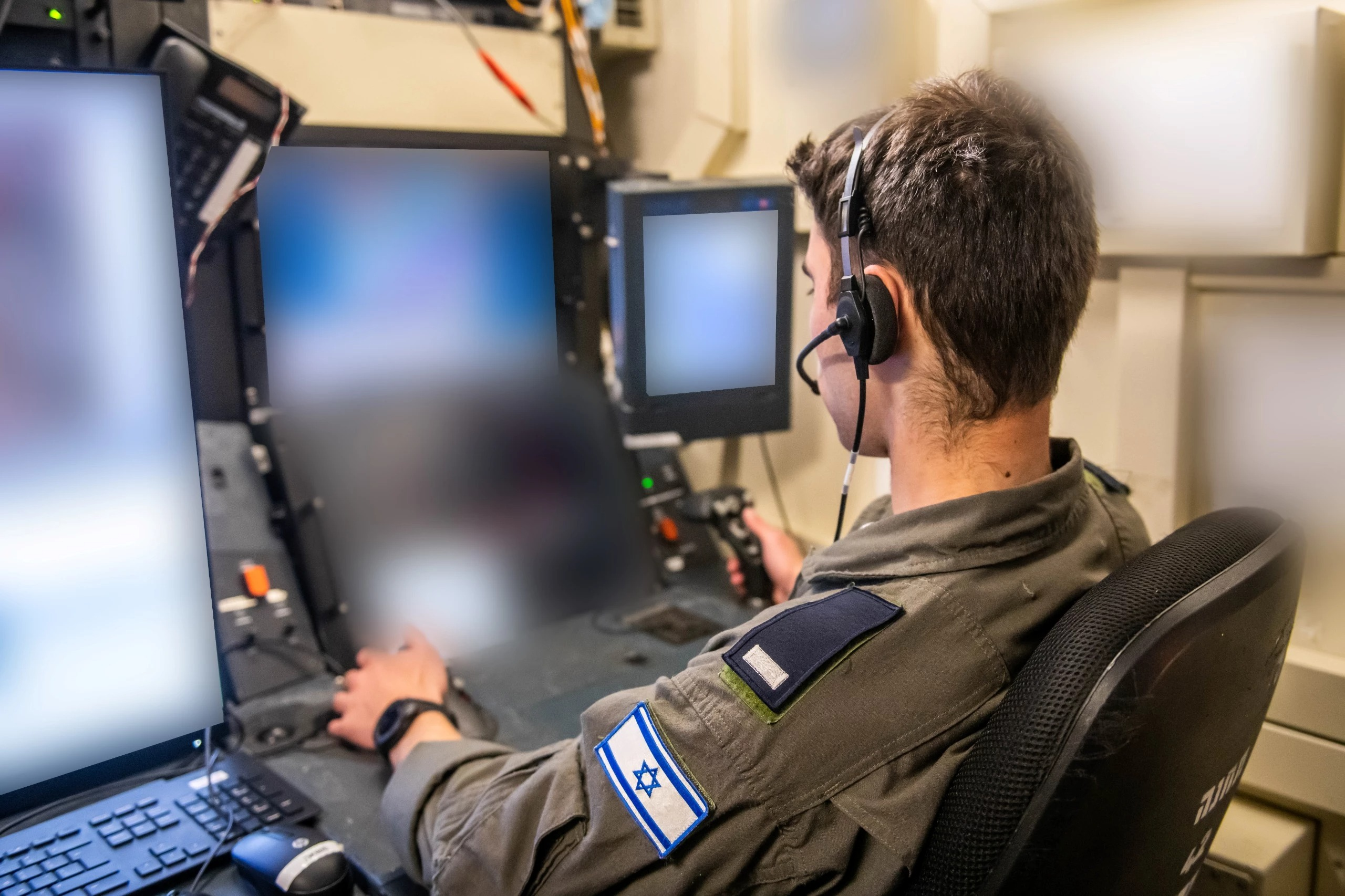
UAV Operator of 147 Squadron "Goring Ram" at Palmachim in 2024

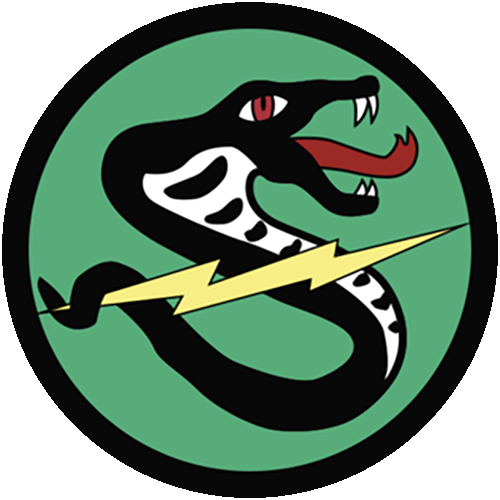
Current symbol of 161 Squadron "Black Snake"

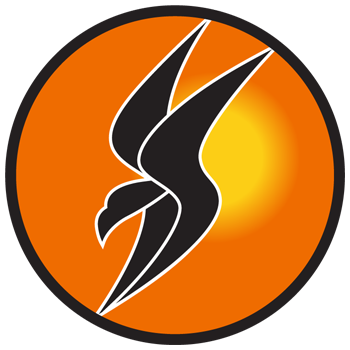
Current symbol of 166 Squadron "Fire Birds"

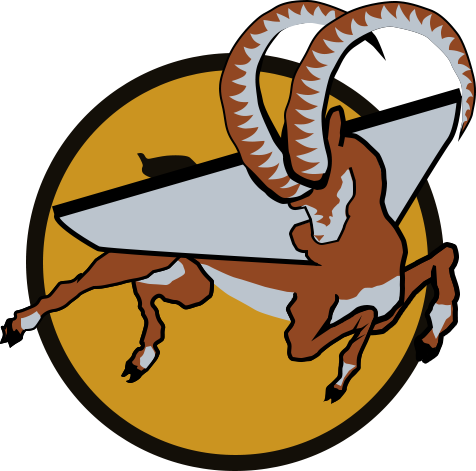
Current symbol of 147 Squadron "Goring Ram"

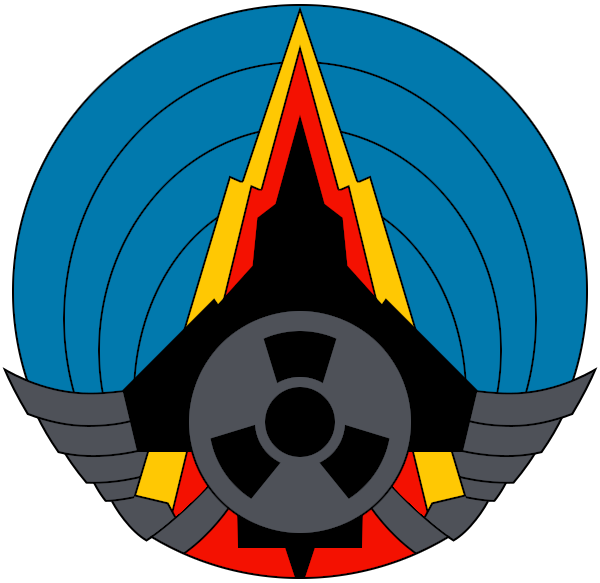
Current symbol of Missile Test Unit 151

In January 2023, the 200 Squadron "First UAV" with Heron 1 UAVs was relocated to Hatzor Airbase. At the beginning of April 2024, the 147 Squadron "Goring Ram" reopened at Palmachim for the fourth time, this time with Hermes 900 Kochav UAVs.

=== Arrow Missiles ===
Israel's first operational Arrow 2 missile battery was installed southeast of the airbase in 2000 (see map). For target detection and tracking, it is used at the Ein Shemer Airfield – together with the Arrow 2 missiles there and others at the Sdot Micha Airbase – the local Super Green Pine Radar with a range of 1000 kilometers. The Arrow 2 missile was developed in the 1990s by Israel together with the USA to defend against larger missiles. The Arrow system is operated by the Israeli Air Defense Command, based on Palmachim. This command is a department of the IAF or the Israeli Air and Space Force and supplements the aircraft squadrons at the bases (see photo in the gallery).

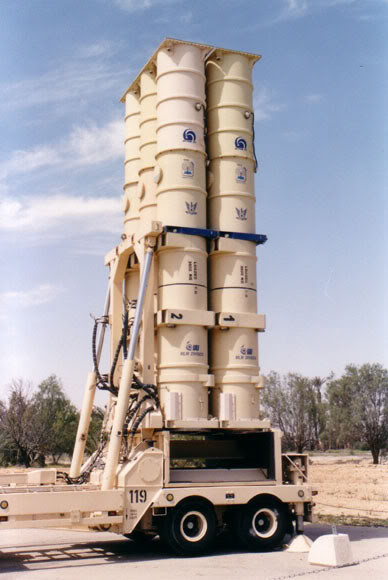
A mobile Arrow 2 launcher, like deployed in a battery near the base

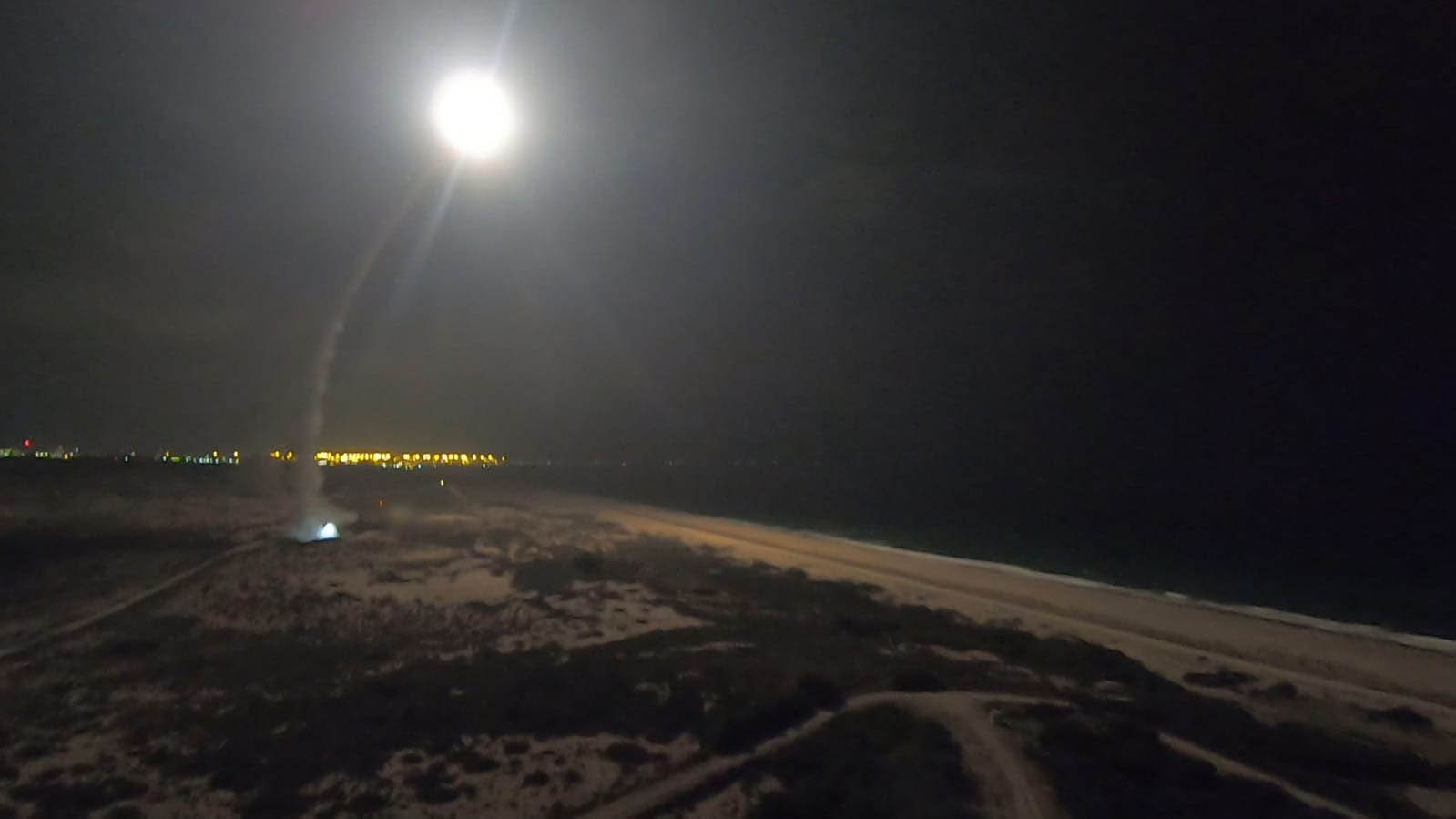
An Arrow 2 test launch south of the base on 12 August 2020

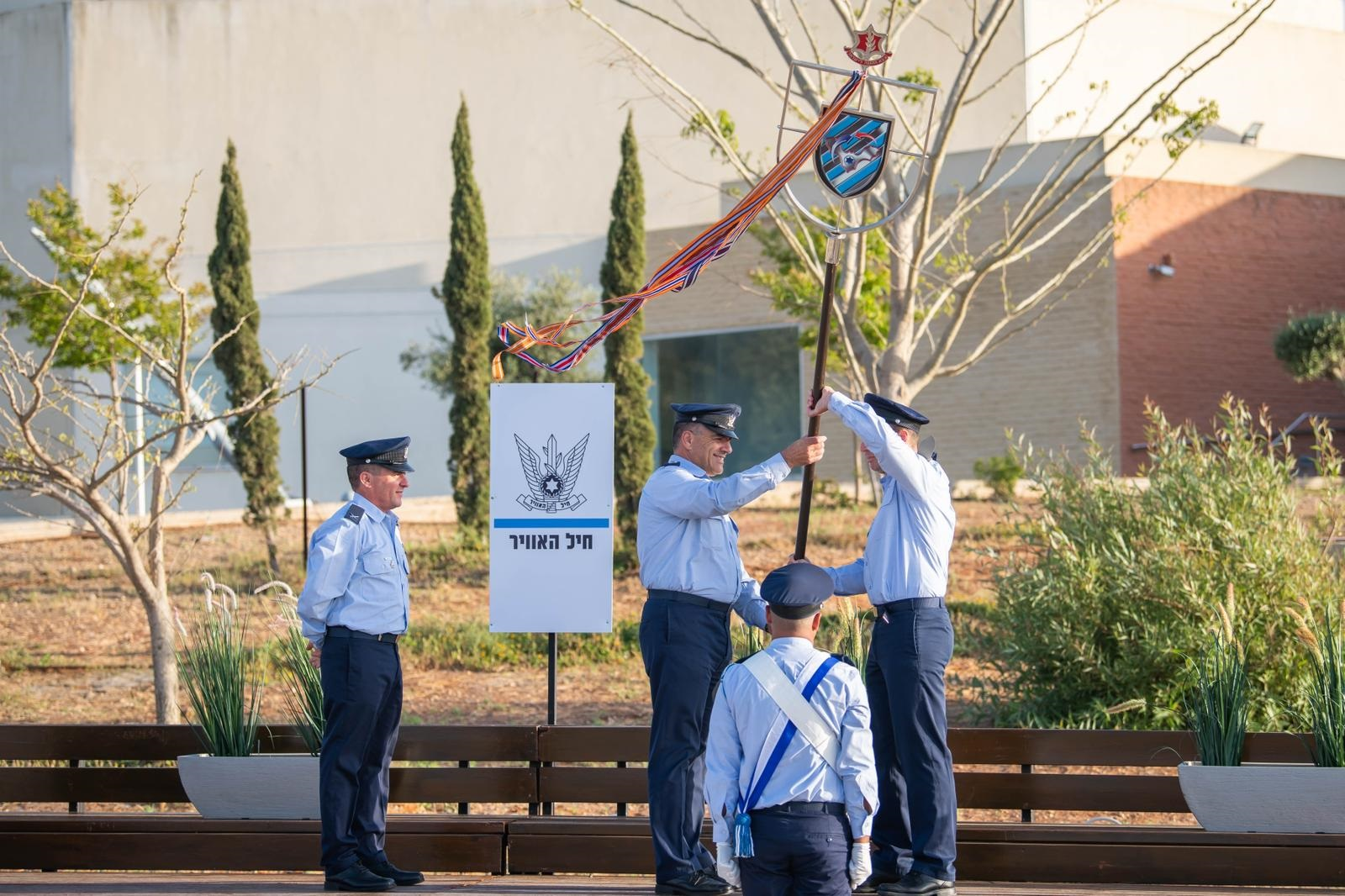
Air Defense Command change of command ceremony at Palmachim, April 2021

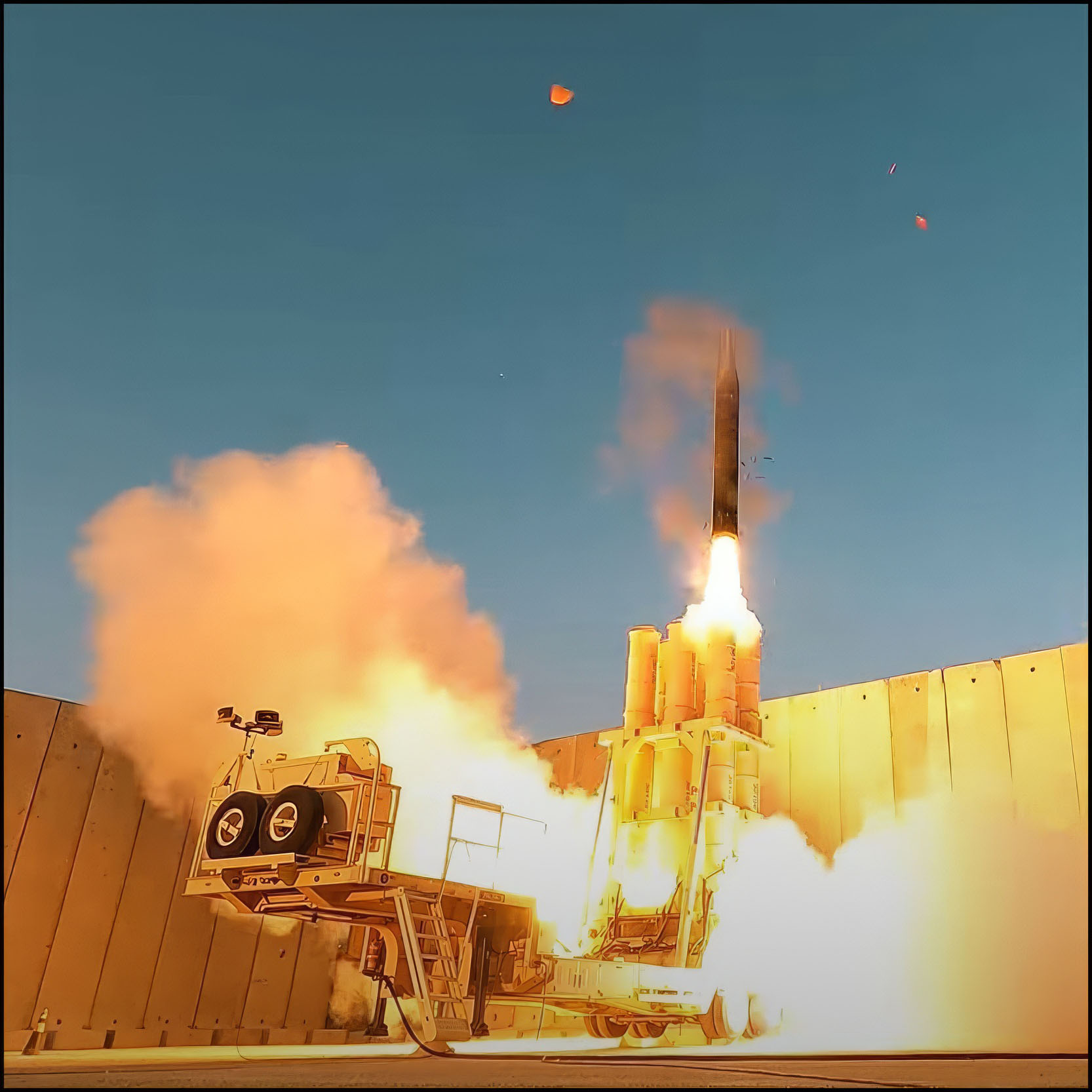
Launch of an Arrow 3 missile in June 2025 during the Twelve-Day War

The further developed Arrow 3 has also been stationed there since 2017.

== Today ==
Currently two squadrons of UH-60 Black Hawk (Yanshuf) and three squadrons of Hermes 450 Zik and Hermes 900 Kochav UAVs are stationed at the base (see also under "Units").

In July 2007, it was agreed that once Sde Dov Airport in Tel Aviv was closed, its military terminal would be transferred to Palmachim. The terminal was transferred when Sde Dov Airport ceased operations in July 2019.

=== Gaza war ===
Since 7 October 2023, the drones from Palmachim and other Israeli military bases (Tel Nof, Hatzor, Ramat David) are operational in the air over the Gaza Strip around the clock, on the one hand to collect information and to carry out attacks with guided weapons. In cooperation with the ground troops, they are supported in their advance, which, according to Israeli analyzes, is a novelty in modern warfare on this scale and quality.

== Units ==
- 123 Squadron "Desert Birds" – operating UH-60 Black Hawk Yanshuf
- 124 Squadron "Rolling Sword" – operating UH-60 Black Hawk Yanshuf, Sikorsky S-70
- 147 Squadron "Goring Ram" – operating Hermes 900 Kochav UAVs
- 151 Squadron "Yanat" – Missile Test Unit
- 161 Squadron "Black Snake" – operating Hermes 450 Zik UAVs
- 166 Squadron "Fire Birds" – operating Hermes 900 Kochav UAVs
- Unit 669 "Flying Cats" – heliborne Combat Search and Rescue (CSAR) (also based on Tel Nof Airbase)
- Unit 5101 "Kingfisher" – Shaldag Unit, IAF's special unit for counter-terrorism, hostage rescue and covert reconnaissance

Unit 669 and 5101 belong to the 7th Special Air Forces Wing which has its headquarters at Palmachim.

- Flight Test Center UAV Division
- UAV Operator School
- Arrow 2 Missile Battery
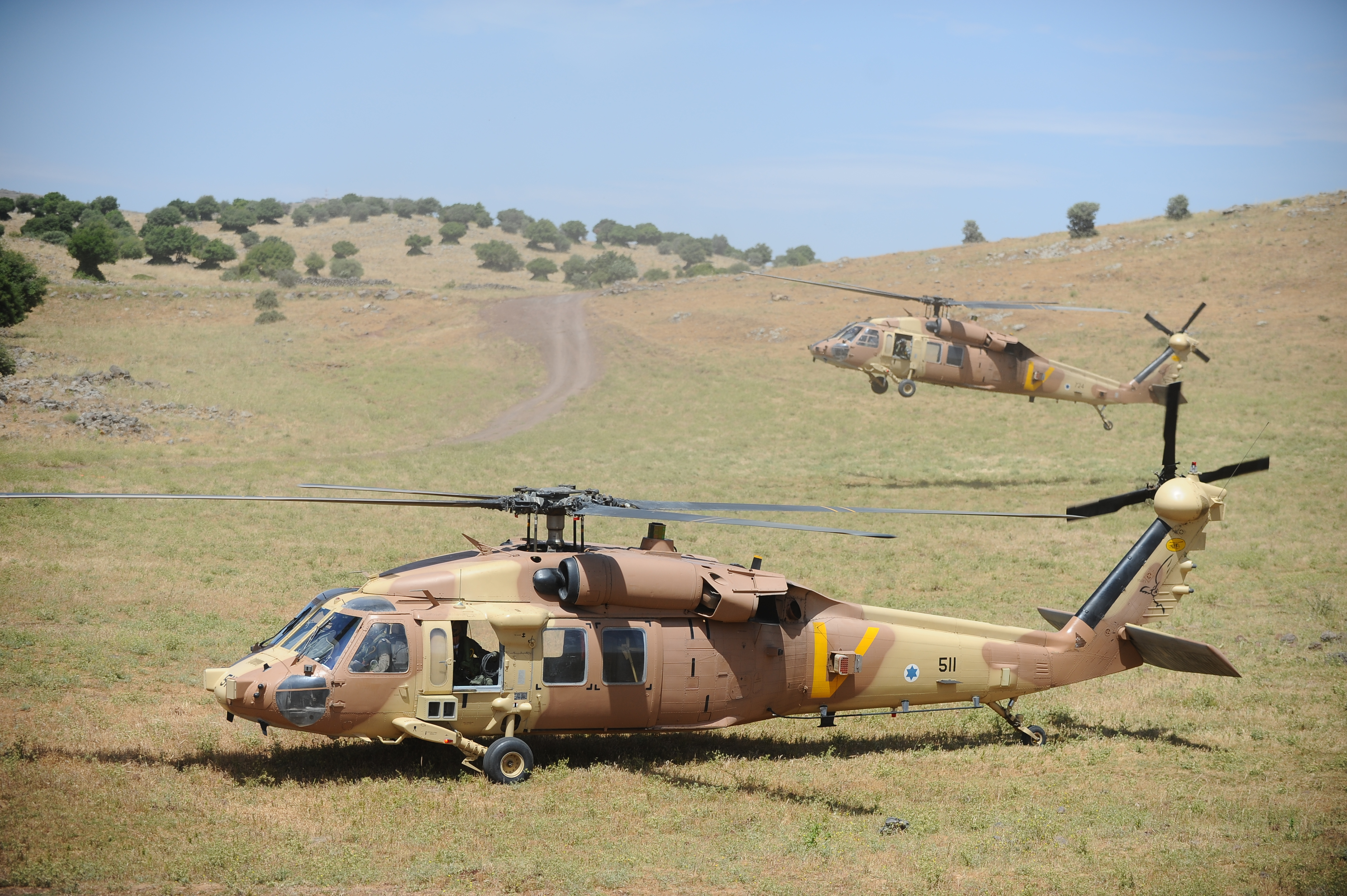
UH-60 Black Hawk of 123 Squadron "Desert Birds" (yellow logo on tail) in May 2012

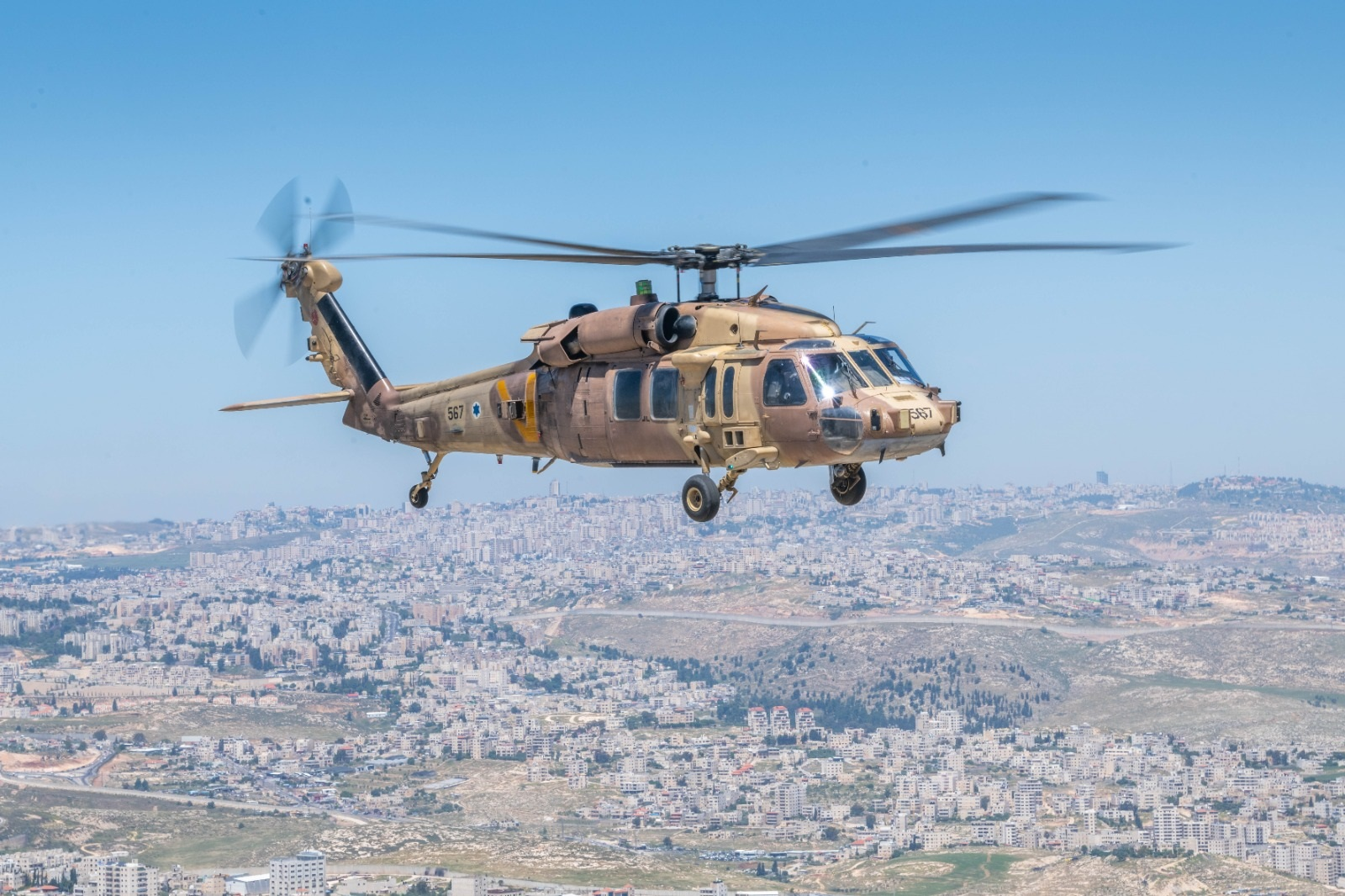
UH-60 Black Hawk of 124 Squadron "Rolling Sword" (red logo on tail) in April 2023

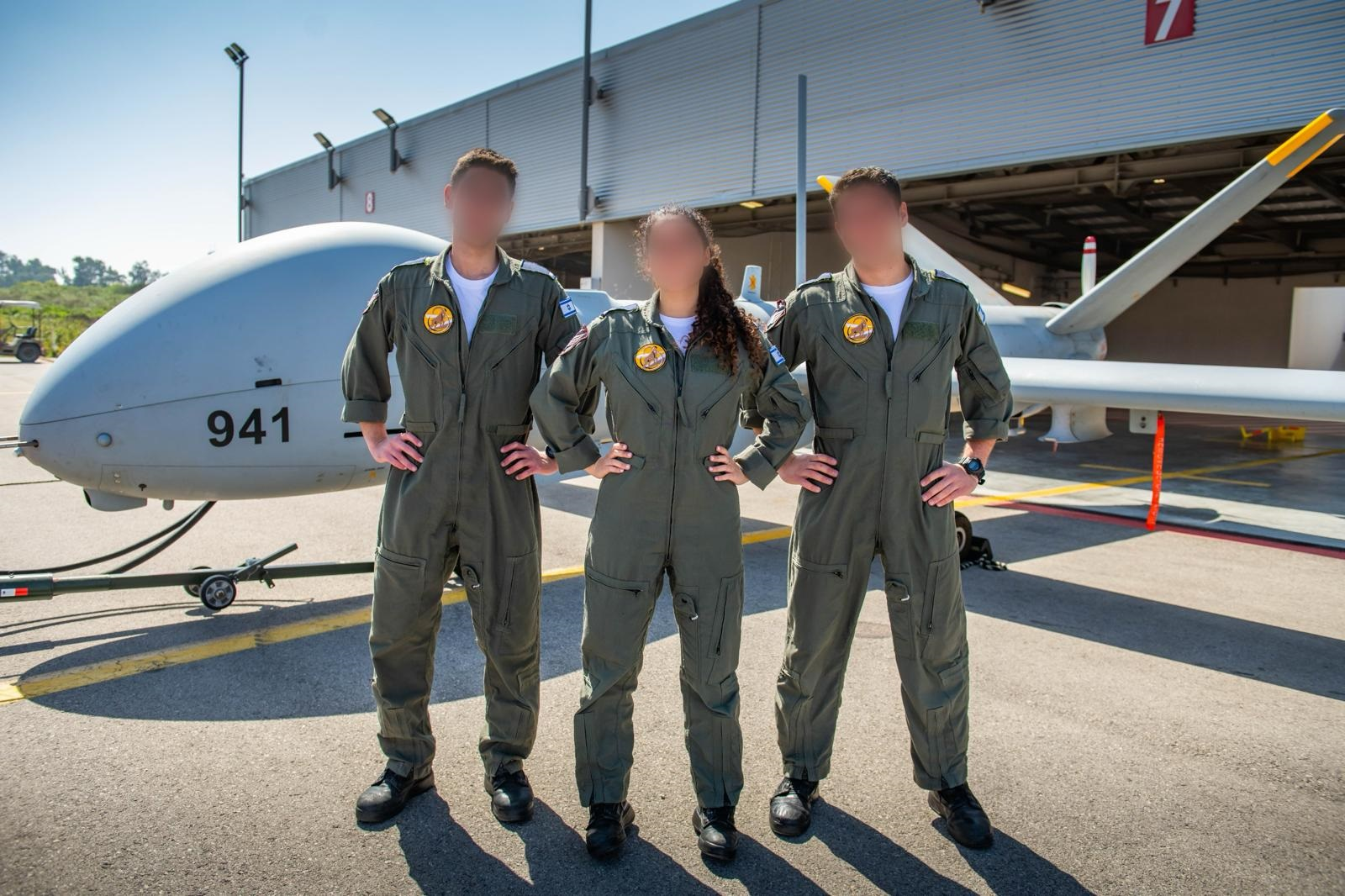
Reopening of 147 Squadron "Goring Ram" with Hermes 900 Kochav UAVs in April 2024

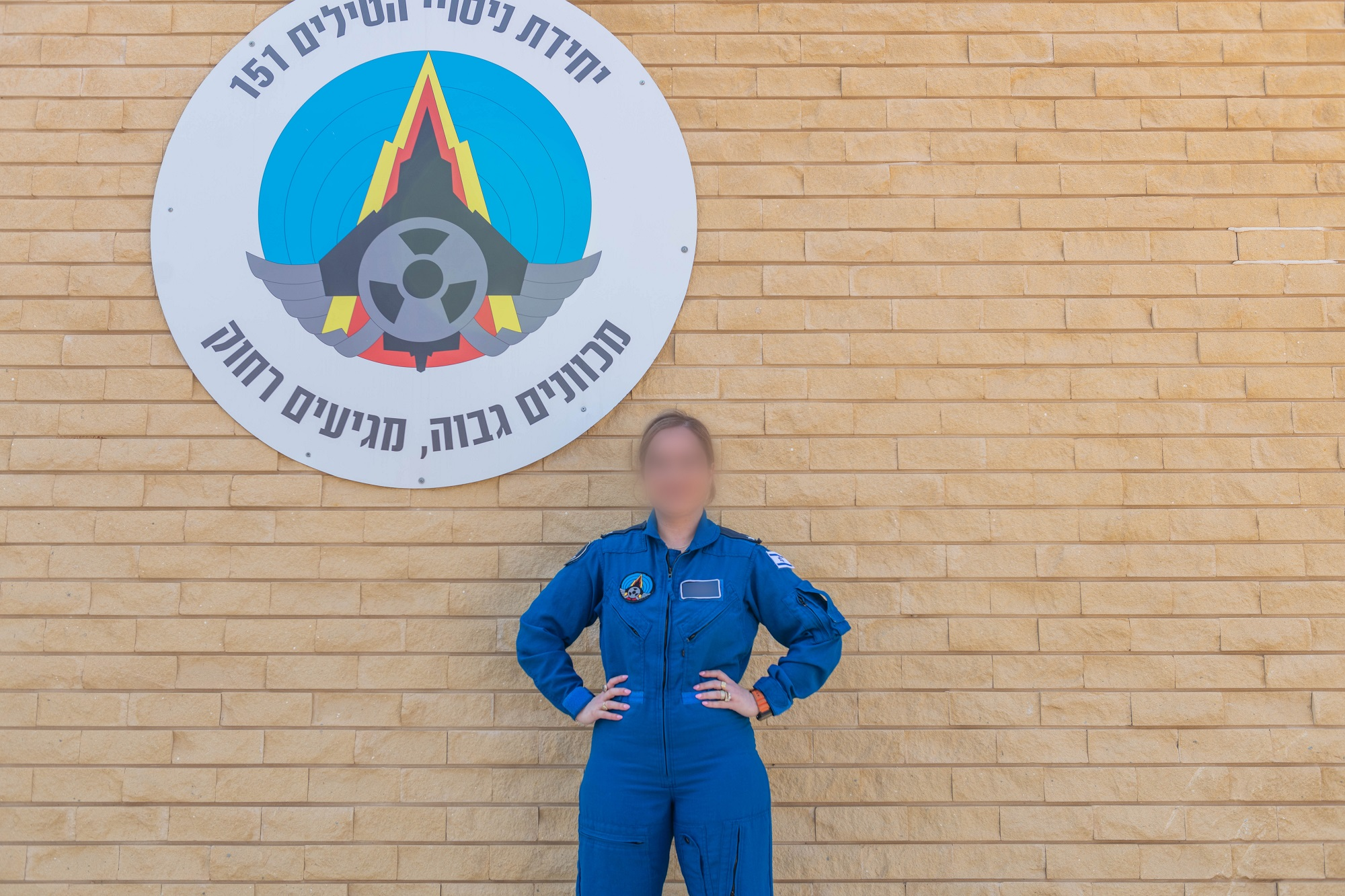
The building and symbol of 151 Squadron "Yanat" for missile testing at the spaceport

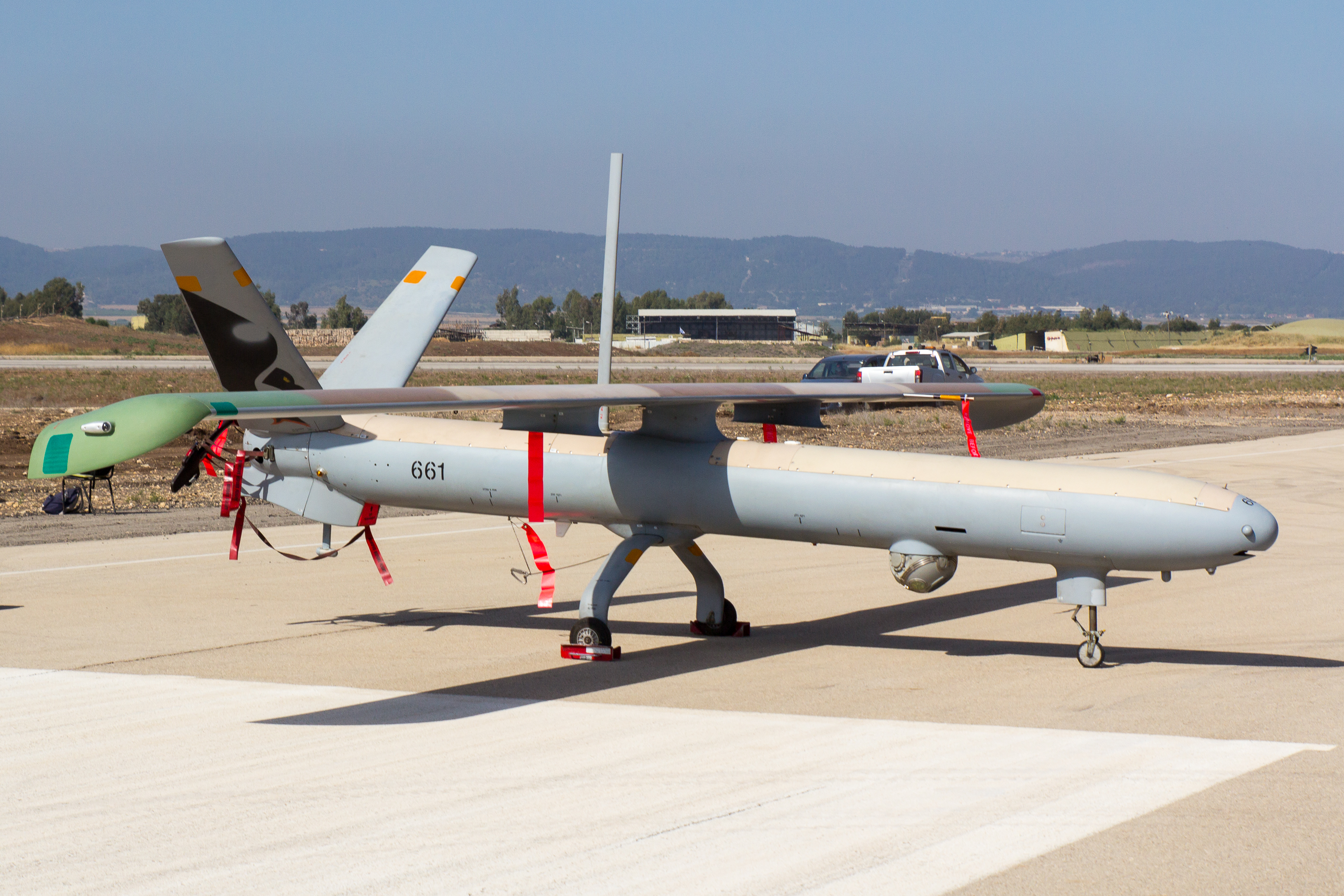
A Hermes 450 Zik UAV of 161 Squadron "Black Snake" in May 2017

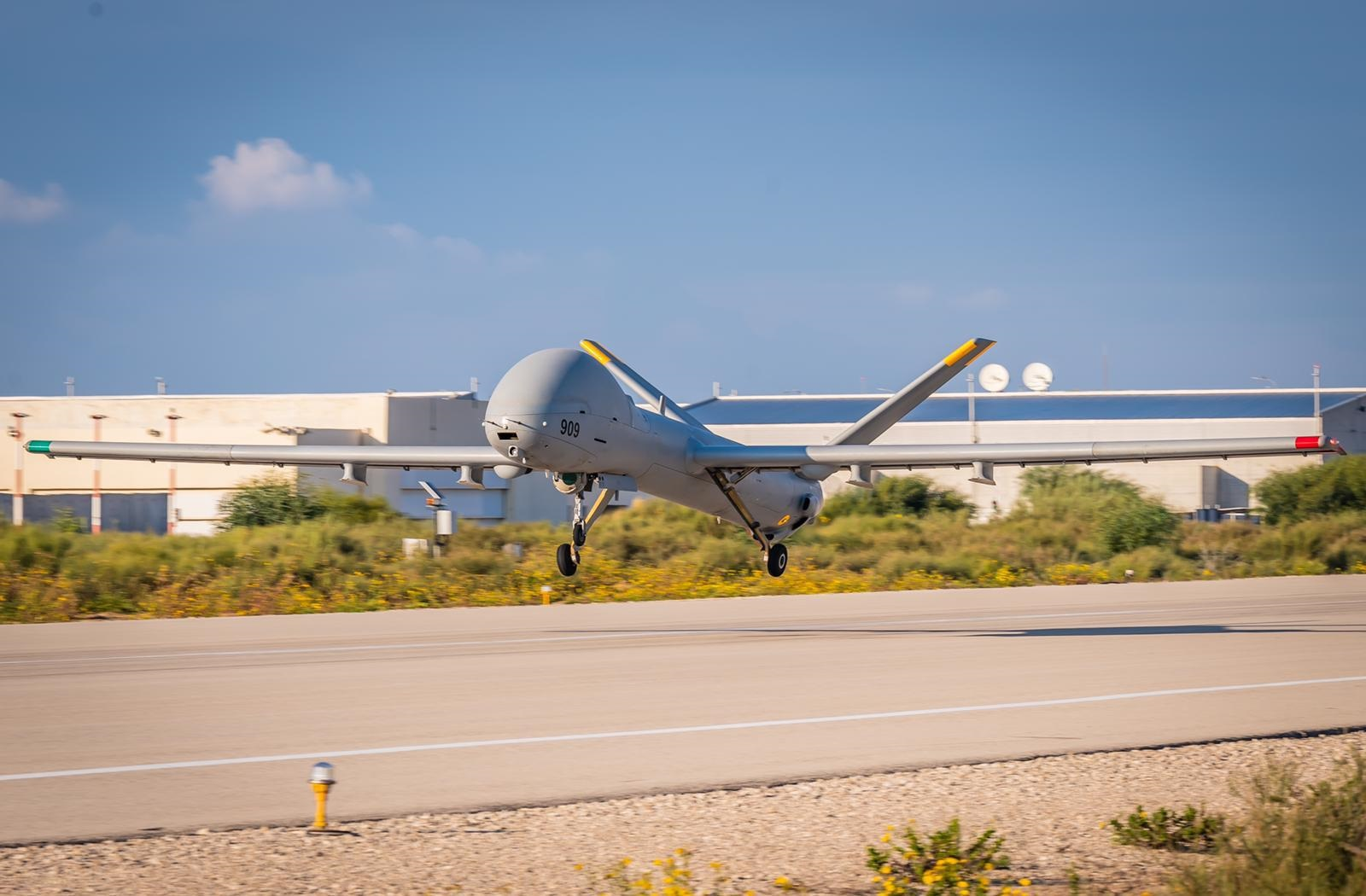
A Hermes 900 Kochav UAV of 166 Squadron "Fire Birds" in May 2021

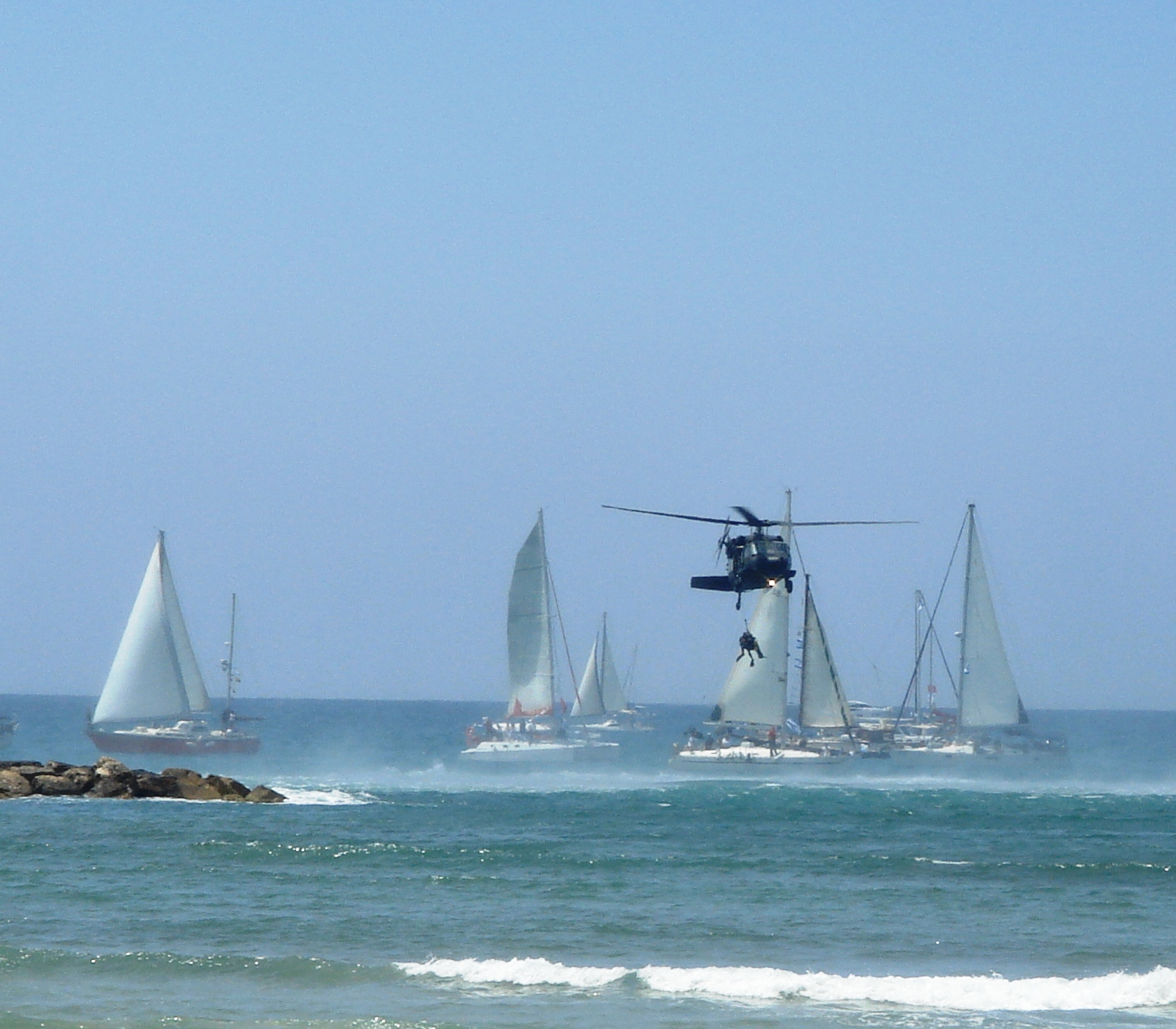
Unit 669 trains sea rescue with a UH-60 Black Hawk Yanshuf in September 2008

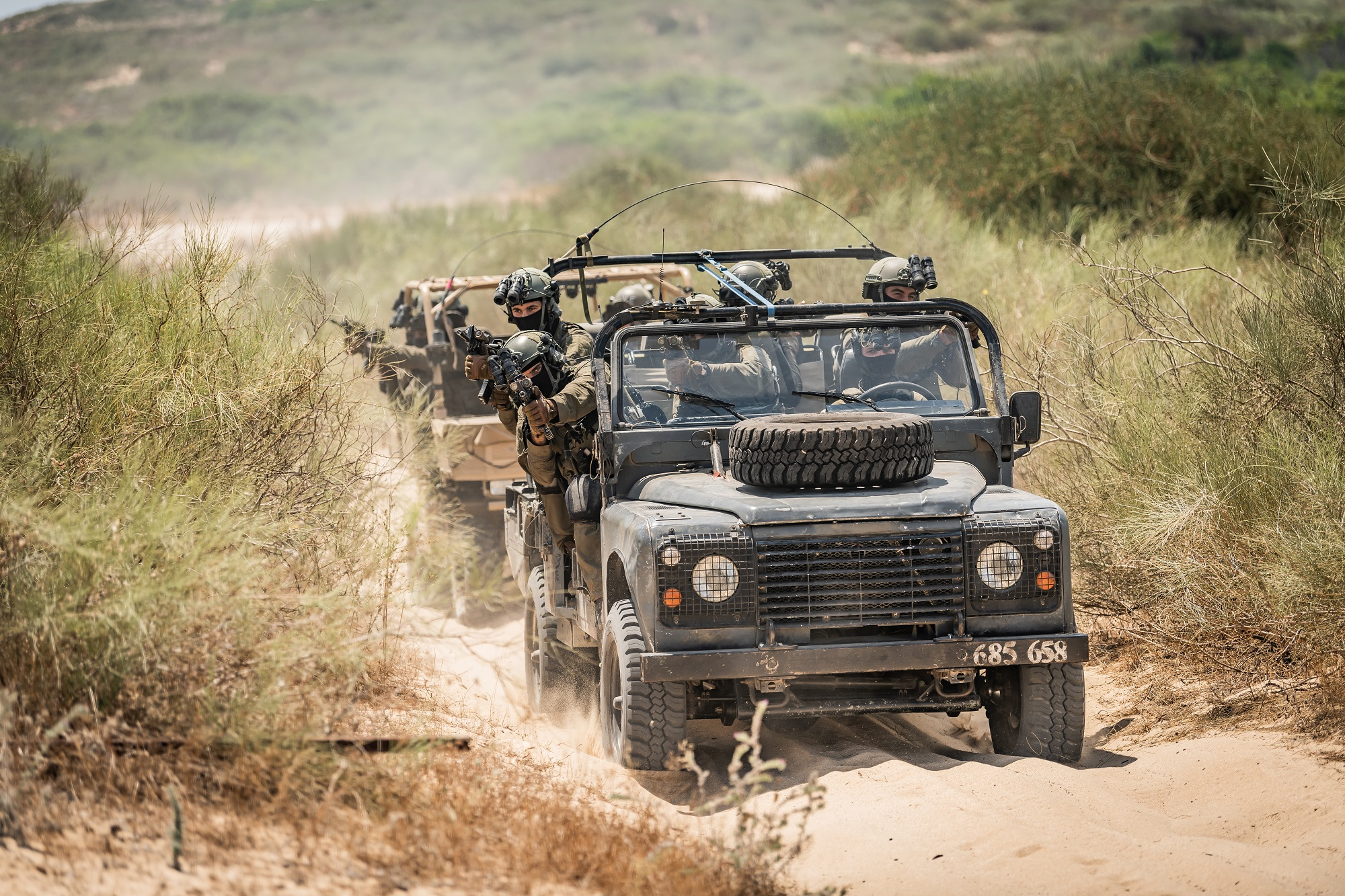
Training of Shaldag Unit "Kingfisher" of the IAF in September 2022

Note: IAF aircraft can usually be assigned to their squadron by the symbols on the tail

== Accidents ==
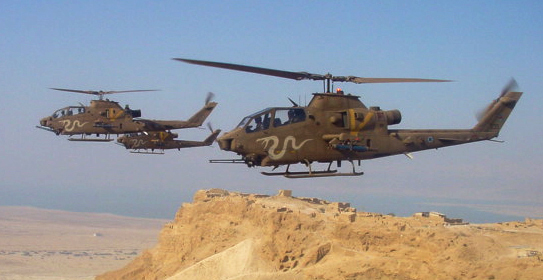
Three AH-1 Cobra Tzefa attack helicopters in front of the ancient fortress Masada in 2010

The AH-1 Cobra Tzefa attack helicopters of the two squadrons on Palmachim, which had existed since 1975/79 and 1985 respectively, had become old at some point and several accidents, some of them fatal, had occurred. From 1990 onwards they were also in competition with the newer AH-64 Apache, so that all Cobras were finally decommissioned in the course of 2013. In addition, the UAVs also stationed on Palmachim had become increasingly more powerful, are much cheaper to purchase and maintain and no longer endanger the lives of pilots.

- On 15 March 1998, an explosion occurred in flight on a AH-1 Cobra Tzefa, which caused the aircraft to crash over the sea off the coast of Israel. Both pilots were recovered dead.
- On the night of 12 March 2013, a AH-1 Cobra Tzefa crashed into a field near the Kibbutz Revadim in central Israel. Both pilots were killed in the accident. The helicopter was returning to the Palmachim base after an exercise. It did not catch fire during the crash and so the accident site was not discovered until early in the morning. The IAF subsequently ordered an investigation and all other AH-1 helicopters were banned from taking off until further notice. Around five weeks later, the cause of the accident was determined to be the fracture of a rear rotor blade, which indicates material fatigue.
- On the night of 10–11 September 2024, a UH-60 Black Hawk Yanshuf from Palmachim crashed during a rescue mission by Unit 669 near Rafah in the southern Gaza Strip. Two soldiers were killed and seven others were injured, some seriously. It is currently assumed that the helicopter was not brought down by enemy fire. IAF commander Major General Tomer Bar convened a commission of inquiry.
- On 18 June 2025, Iran announced that its air defenses had shot down an Israeli Hermes 900 Kochav drone during an airstrike over the Isfahan province in central Iran, and provided video evidence to support this. The IDF confirmed this, saying that the drone was shot down by a surface-to-air missile and that there were no casualties or loss of intelligence. Long-range drones of the Hermes 900 Kochav type are stationed only on Palmachim in two squadrons (see: units).

== Rockets and satellites ==
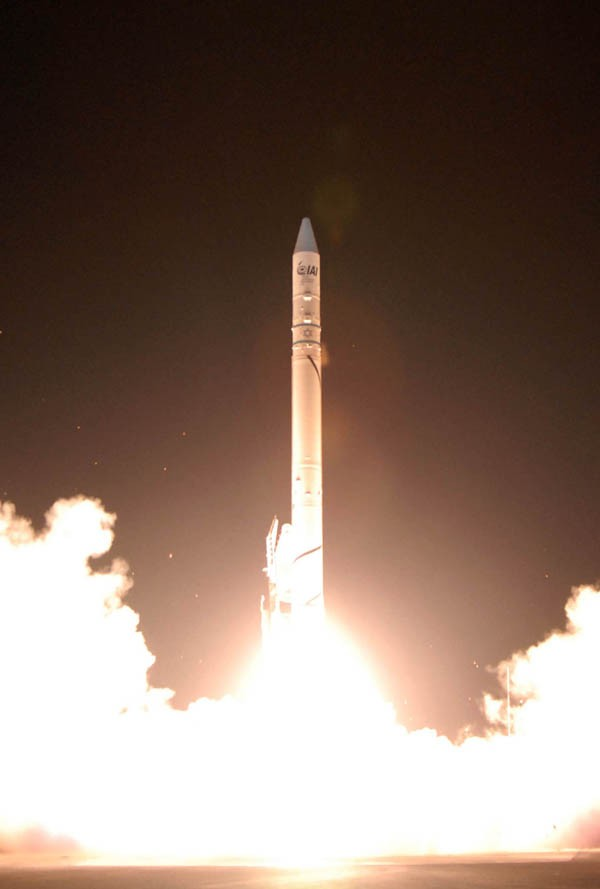
Start of a Shavit 2 missile at the spaceport in 2007

The launchpad south of the base is used by ISA to launch the Shavit space launch vehicle into retrograde orbit, acting as Israel's primary spaceport. Since the end of the 1960s the IAF uses Palmachim to test ballistic missiles, such as the Jericho and later the Arrow. The launchpad is situated at 31°53′04″N 34°40′49″E.

Due to Israel's geographical location and hostile relations with neighboring countries, the rockets launch west across the Mediterranean. This avoids flying over enemy countries that could use the technology in the event of a crash and prevents parts from falling into populated areas. The satellites launched are on non-equatorial orbits and are among the few earth satellites that orbit the earth in an east–west direction. Taking off against the earth's rotation causes approximately 30% higher fuel consumption.

Recent launches include:

- 11 June 2007 - Ofeq-7 satellite
- 17 January 2008 - version of the Jericho III missile
- 22 June 2010 - Ofeq-9 satellite
- 2 November 2011 - version of the Jericho III missile
- 9 April 2014 - Ofeq-10 satellite
- 13 September 2016 - Ofeq-11 satellite
- 29 May 2017 - rocket propulsion system test launch
- 6 July 2020 - Ofeq-16 reconnaissance satellite
- 28 March 2023 - Ofeq-13 SAR (Synthetic Aperture Radar) reconnaissance satellite

=== Orbital launch history ===
| Type of rocket | Date of Launch | Launch Location | Payload | Mission Status |
| Shavit | 19 September 1988 | Palmachim Airbase | (Israel) Ofeq-1 | Success, experimental payload |
| Shavit | 3 April 1990 | Palmachim Airbase | (Israel) Ofeq-2 | Success, experimental payload |
| Shavit | 15 September 1994 | Palmachim Airbase | (Israel) Ofeq ? | Failure, unknown payload |
| Shavit-1 | 5 April 1995 | Palmachim Airbase | (Israel) Ofeq-3 | Success, first Israeli operational satellite in orbit |
| Shavit-1 | 22 January 1998 | Palmachim Airbase | (Israel) Ofeq-4 | Failure |
| Shavit-1 | 28 May 2002 | Palmachim Airbase | (Israel) Ofeq-5 | Success, second Israeli operational satellite in orbit |
| Shavit-1 | 6 September 2004 | Palmachim Airbase | (Israel) Ofeq-6 | Failure |
| Shavit-2 | 11 June 2007 | Palmachim Airbase | (Israel) Ofeq-7 | Success, third Israeli operational satellite in orbit |
| Shavit-2 | 22 June 2010 | Palmachim Airbase | (Israel) Ofeq-9 | Success |
| Shavit-2 | 9 April 2014 | Palmachim Airbase | (Israel) Ofeq-10 | Success |
| Shavit-2 | 13 September 2016 | Palmachim Airbase | (Israel) Ofeq-11 | Success |
| Shavit-2 | 6 July 2020 | Palmachim Airbase | (Israel) Ofeq-16 | Success |
| Shavit-2 | 28 June 2023 | Palmachim Airbase | (Israel) Ofeq-13 | Success |
| Shavit-2 | 2 September 2025 | Palmachim Airbase | (Israel) Ofeq-19 | Success |

On 17 January 2008, Israel test fired a multi-stage ballistic missile believed to be of the Jericho III type, reportedly capable of carrying "conventional or non conventional warheads". On 2 November 2011, Israel successfully test fired a missile believed to be an upgraded version of the Jericho III; the long trail of smoke was seen throughout central Israel.
