= 160 Squadron (Israel) =

Israeli military unit

160th Squadron IAF
- טייסת 160
- Logo of the Squadron
- Active: April, 1980 – present
- Country: Israel
- Allegiance: Israel Defense Forces
- Branch: Israeli Air Force
- Type: Unmanned Aerial Vehicle Squadron
- Role: Unmanned Aerial Vehicle Operations
- Garrison/HQ: Ramat David Airbase
- Nickname: 'Shadow Hunter Squadron'

Insignia
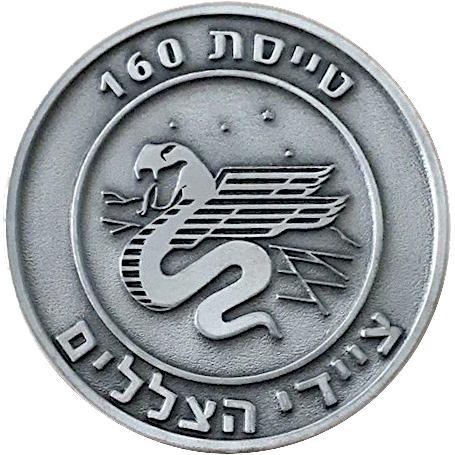
- Medal of recognition for the reopening of 160 Squadron on Ramat David Airbase in 2018

Aircraft flown
- Helicopter: AH-1 Cobra

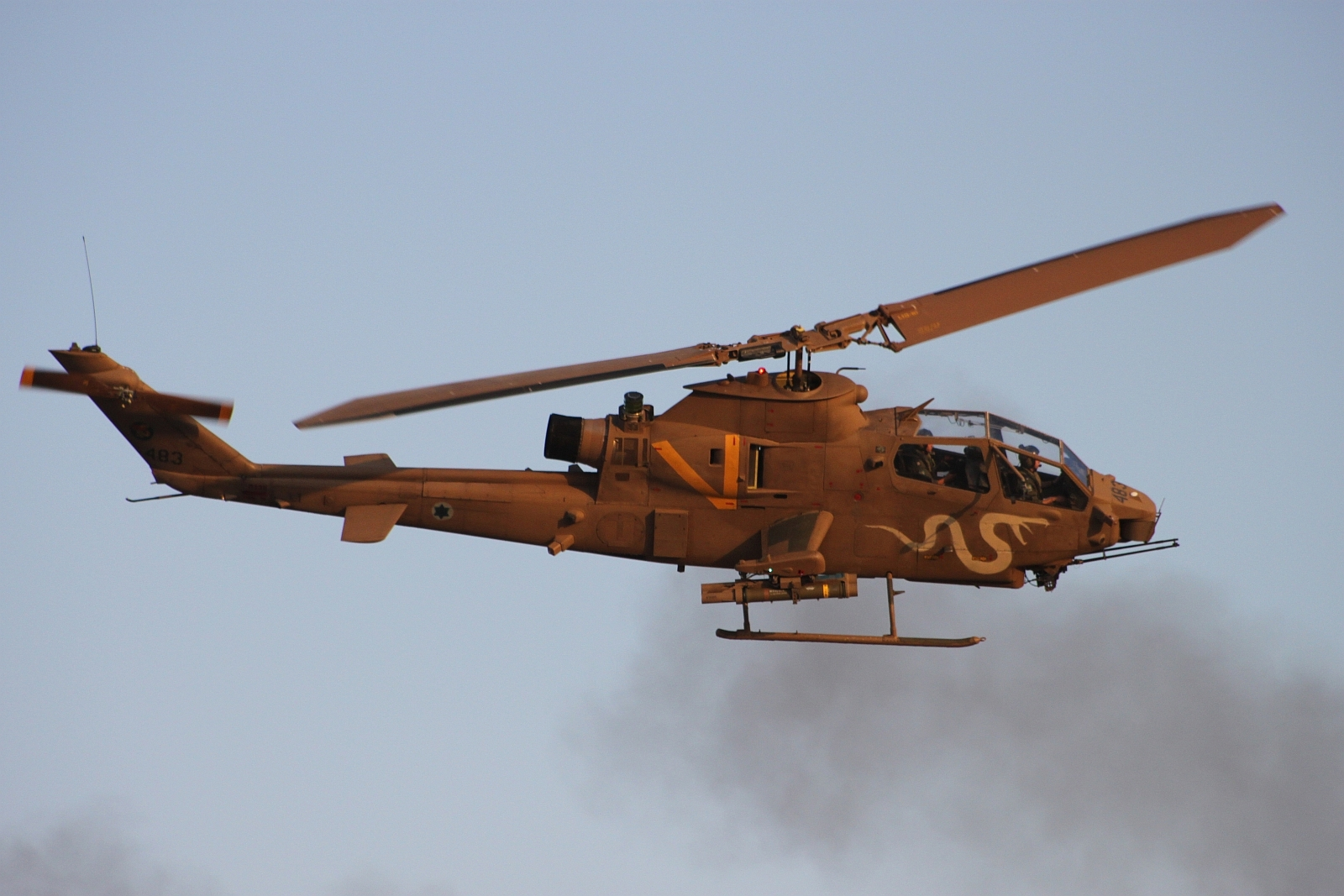
160 Squadron AH-1 Cobra

160 Squadron of the Israeli Air Force (also known as Shadow Hunter Squadron, formerly known as First Cobra or Southern Cobra Squadron) was formed in April 1980.

The squadron initially operated fifteen MD500s and three AH-1S Cobras. In the following year, nine AH-1F Cobras were delivered, followed by eight more in 1985, and four more in 1987. The squadron conducted operations during Operation Peace for Galilee, Israel's 1982 invasion of Lebanon, but did not initially engage in anti-tank combat, rather serving as close air support. In 2001, Israel acquired 15 AH-1E helicopters from the US Army. As of 2005, the squadron uses exclusively AH-1E/F helicopters.

The squadron was based at Palmachim Airbase.

On 2 August 2013, as part of the IDF's budget cut plans, along with the fact that the Cobra helicopters were considered relatively unsafe with many accidents credited to its operation history, it was closed (along with 140 Squadron "Golden Eagle",)

In 2018, the 160 Squadron was reopened at Ramat David Airbase as Shadow Hunter Squadron, operating classified UAVs.
