= 123 Squadron (Israel) =

Israeli military unit

123rd Squadron IAF
- טייסת 123
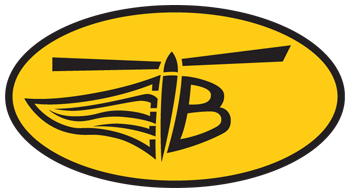
- Logo of the Squadron
- Country: Israel
- Allegiance: Israel Defense Forces
- Branch: Israeli Air Force
- Type: Helicopter squadron
- Role: Transportation, extraction, and search & rescue
- Garrison/HQ: Palmachim Airbase
- Nickname: Desert Birds Squadron

Aircraft flown
- Helicopter: S-70A Black Hawks

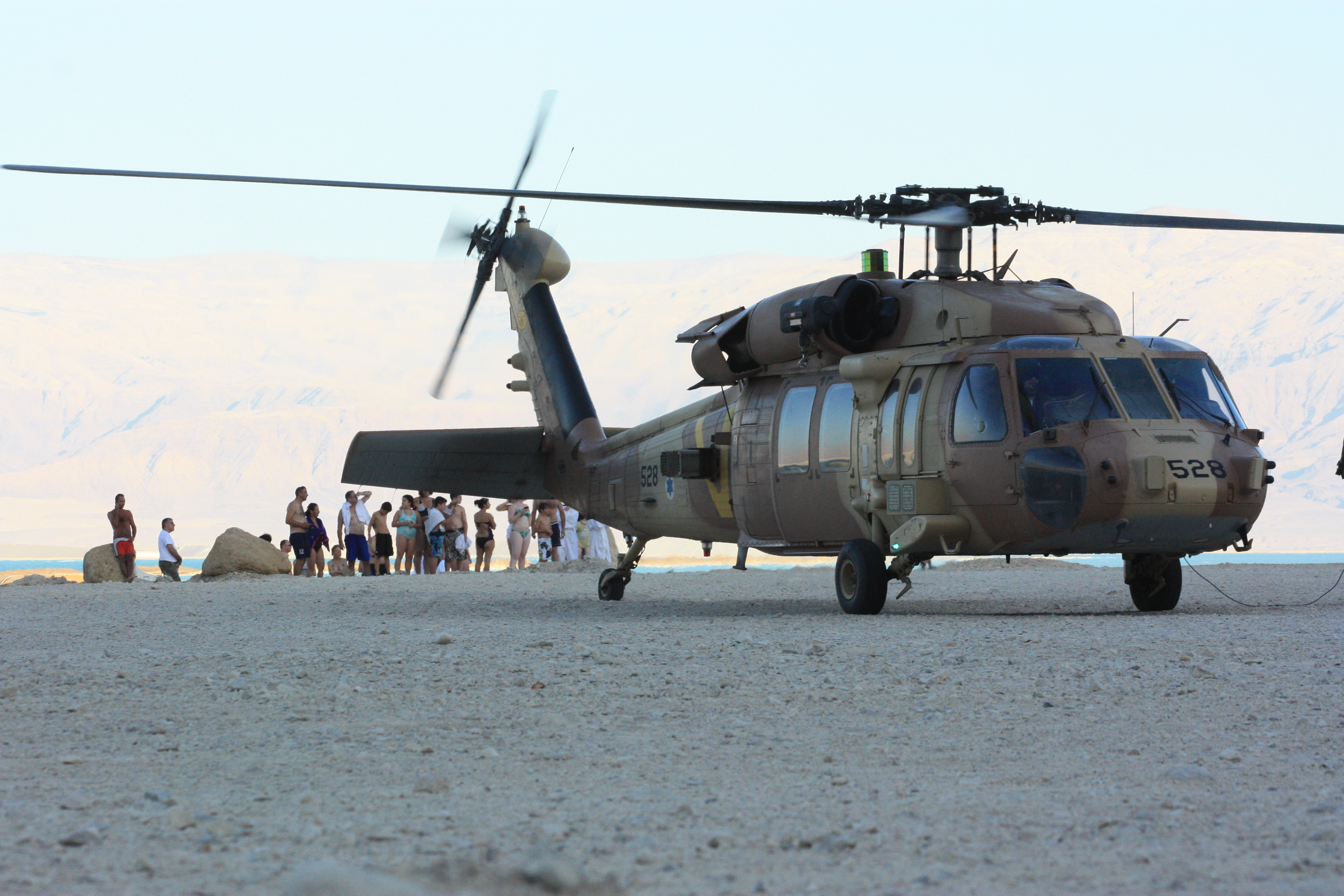
"Black Hawk" of the 123rd Squadron

The 123rd Squadron is a squadron of the Israeli Air Force. It is also known as the Desert Birds Squadron (formerly the Southern Bells Squadron).

The 123rd Squadron is a helicopter squadron of S-70A Black Hawks based at Palmachim Airbase.

Their main assignments are transportation, extraction, and Search & Rescue.

== History ==
The squadron was formed on 10 March 1965, and operated the Bell 47 Helicopters. The squadron operated out of Tel Nof Airbase and served as a Helicopter Training School. Later on, they shifted to Bell 205 Helicopters, and in August 1969 the squadron relocated to Hatzerim Airbase. In 1978, they switched from Bell 205 helicopters to Bell 212 Helicopters ("אנפה / heron"), which served until 2002.

During the Yom Kippur War, the squadron operated mainly in the Southern Front. One of its helicopters was shot down by Egyptian anti-aircraft fire, and the entire crew but the co-pilot were killed. In the First Lebanon War, the squadron lost two helicopters; one was shot down by anti-aircraft fire from terrorists in Nabatieh, and the second entangled in electric wires during an operation next to Lake Qaraoun and crashed. Both crews perished.

On 24 September 1984, a Heron helicopter crashed into Nahal Bezek during chase training with the Golani Brigade. In the accident, the two pilots were killed, along with a Crew Chief, and two of the Golani Brigade.

On 8 August 2002, the squadron was re-established in the Hatzerim Airbase as a Sikorsky UH-60 Black Hawk squadron ("ינשוף / Owl"). The first five helicopters arrived in Israel at the beginning of the month in a C-5 Galaxy of the US Air Force that landed in the Nevatim Airbase. The 123rd Squadron is the second Black Hawk squadron in Israel, following the 124th Squadron stationed in the Palmachim Airbase.

The squadron received the Chief of Staff Citation for its actions in the Second Lebanon War.

In 2015 it was decided to transfer the squadron to the Palmachim Airbase, which occurred on 15 July 2015.

The squadron was involved in the first rescue mission of the Israeli invasion of the Gaza Strip in the Gaza war.

== Previous Aircraft ==
The squadron operated in the past the following helicopters:

- Bell 212
- Bell205
- Bell 47
- Sikorsky S-58 that was loaned from the 124th Squadron.
