= 166 Squadron (Israel) =

Squadron of the Israeli Air Force

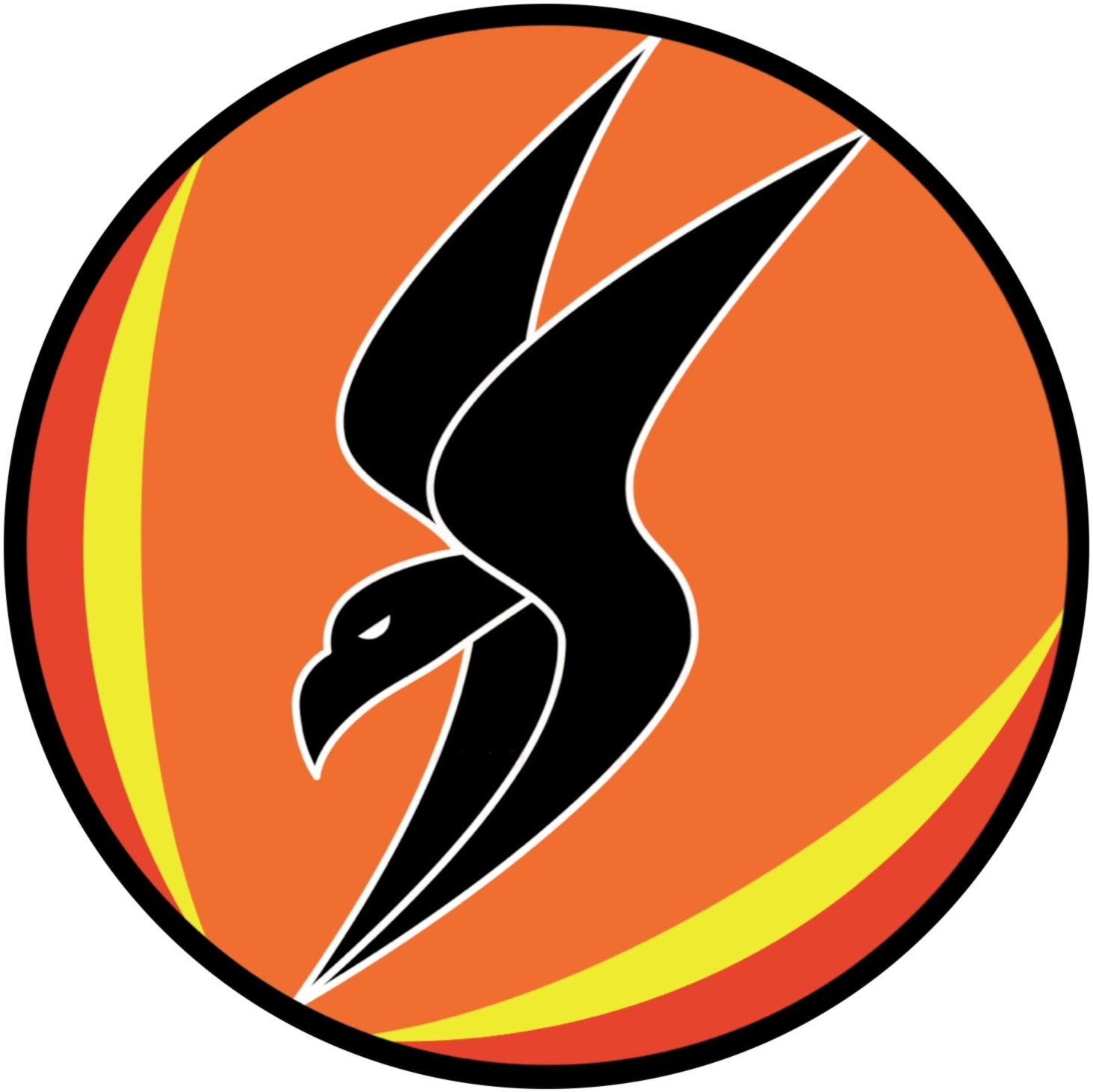
- 166 Squadron logo
- Active: 2003 - Today
- Country: Israel
- Branch: Israeli Air Force
- Garrison/HQ: Palmachim Airbase
- Nickname: 1st Zik Squadron

Aircraft flown
- Hermes 900

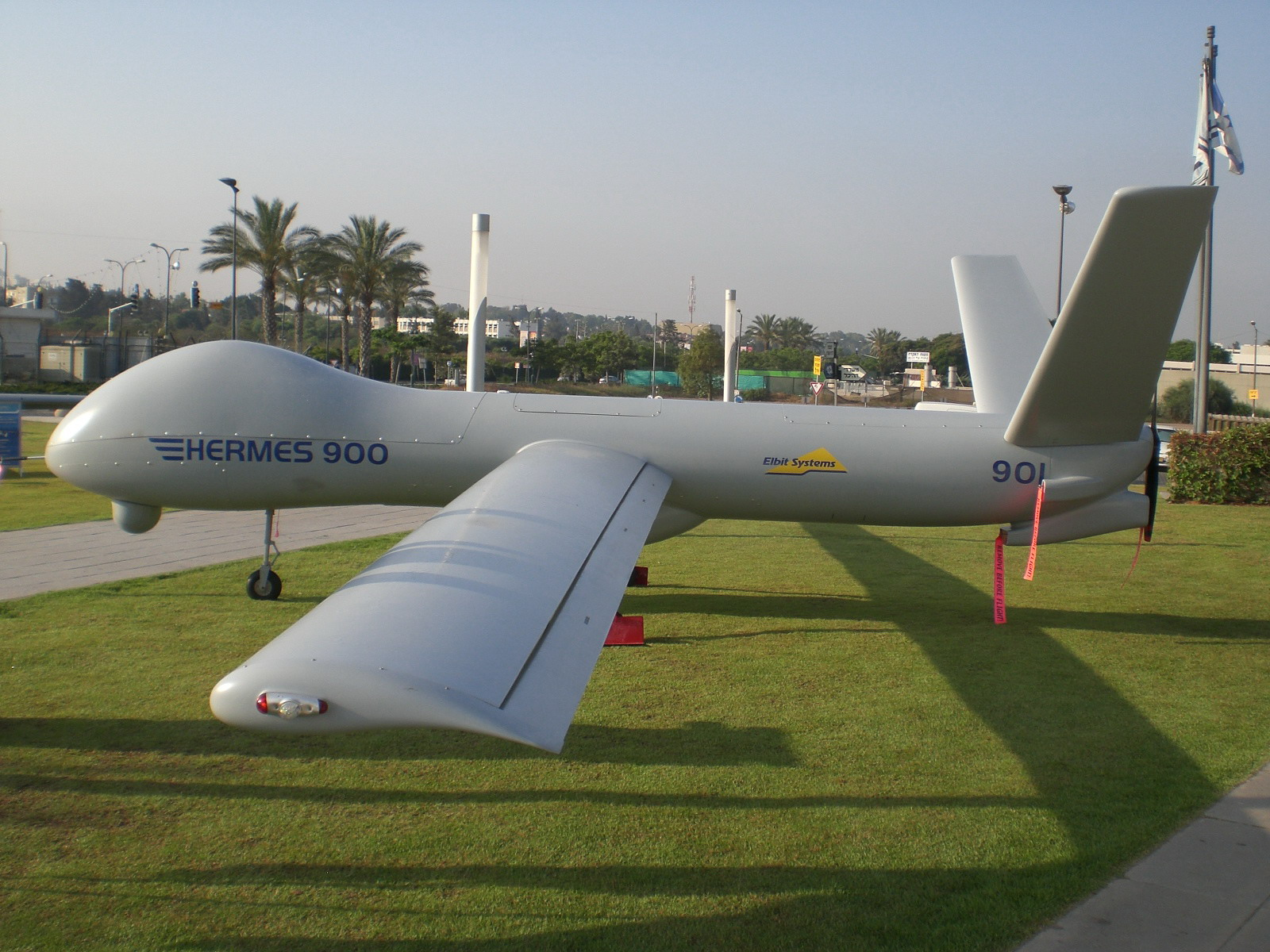
Hermes 900

The 166 Squadron of the Israeli Air Force, also known as the Fire Birds Squadron, is an Elbit Hermes 900 squadron based at Palmachim Airbase.

== History ==
Squadron 166 was established in February 1999, as a classified project whose purpose was to operate in emergency situations only.

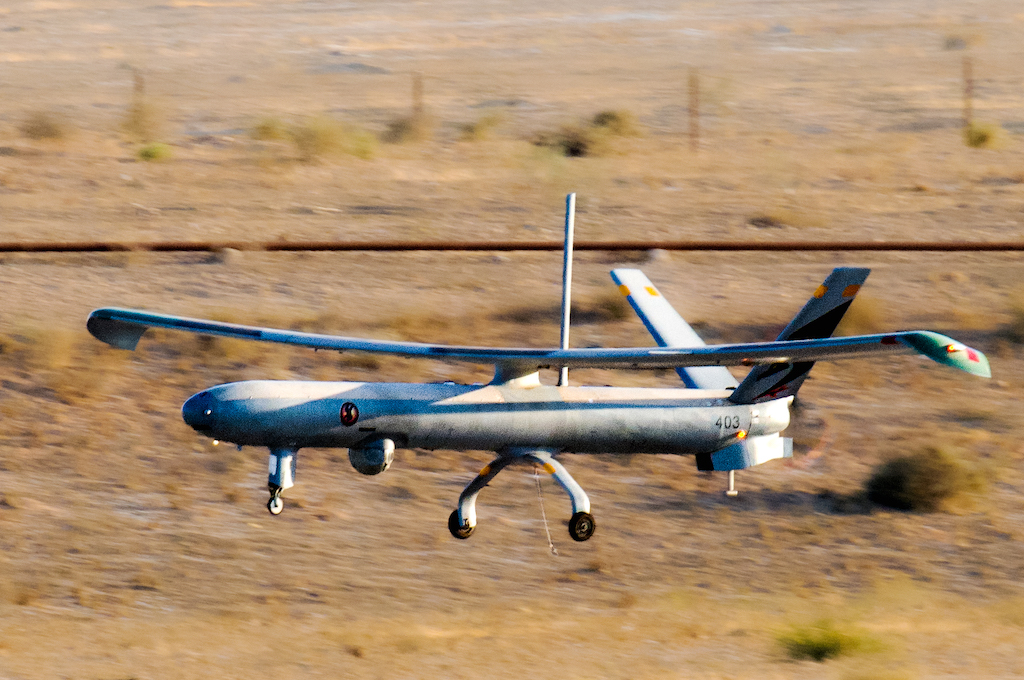
Hermes 450 Aircraft of the Squadron

A few years later, it was realized in the Air Force that the efficiency and advanced features of the UAV can be of great benefit in the ongoing security and combat routine. In 2003, the project was founded as Squadron 166 and since then the squadron has taken part in any operational activity or war when its mission is to collect Signal intelligence, visual intelligence and aerial photographs. From the beginning of its activity, the squadron operated the Hermes 450 ("Zik") aircraft and was the first squadron to operate it in the Air Force, therefore the squadron received the nickname "the first Zik squadron". It then switched to Hermes 900 Aircraft.
