= 200 Squadron (Israel) =

Israeli military unit

- יחידת טייסת 200
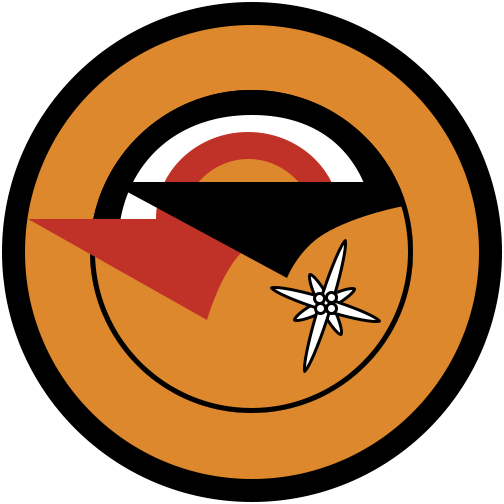
- Founded: April 1, 2004
- Country: Israel
- Engagements: War of Attrition
- Website: http://www.iaf.org.il/4968-33518-he/IAF.aspx (Defunct)

Aircraft flown
- Attack: UAV IAI Heron Shoval

The 200 Squadron of the Israeli Air Force, also known as the "First UAV", is an IAI Heron Shoval squadron formerly based at Palmachim Airbase and relocated to Hatzor Airbase in January 2023.
