= 161 Squadron (Israel) =

Israeli military unit

- טייסת הנחש השחור
- Active: 1980 - Today
- Country: Israel
- Branch: Israeli Air Force
- Garrison/HQ: Palmahim airbase
- Nickname(s): Black Snake

Aircraft flown
- Elbit Hermes 450

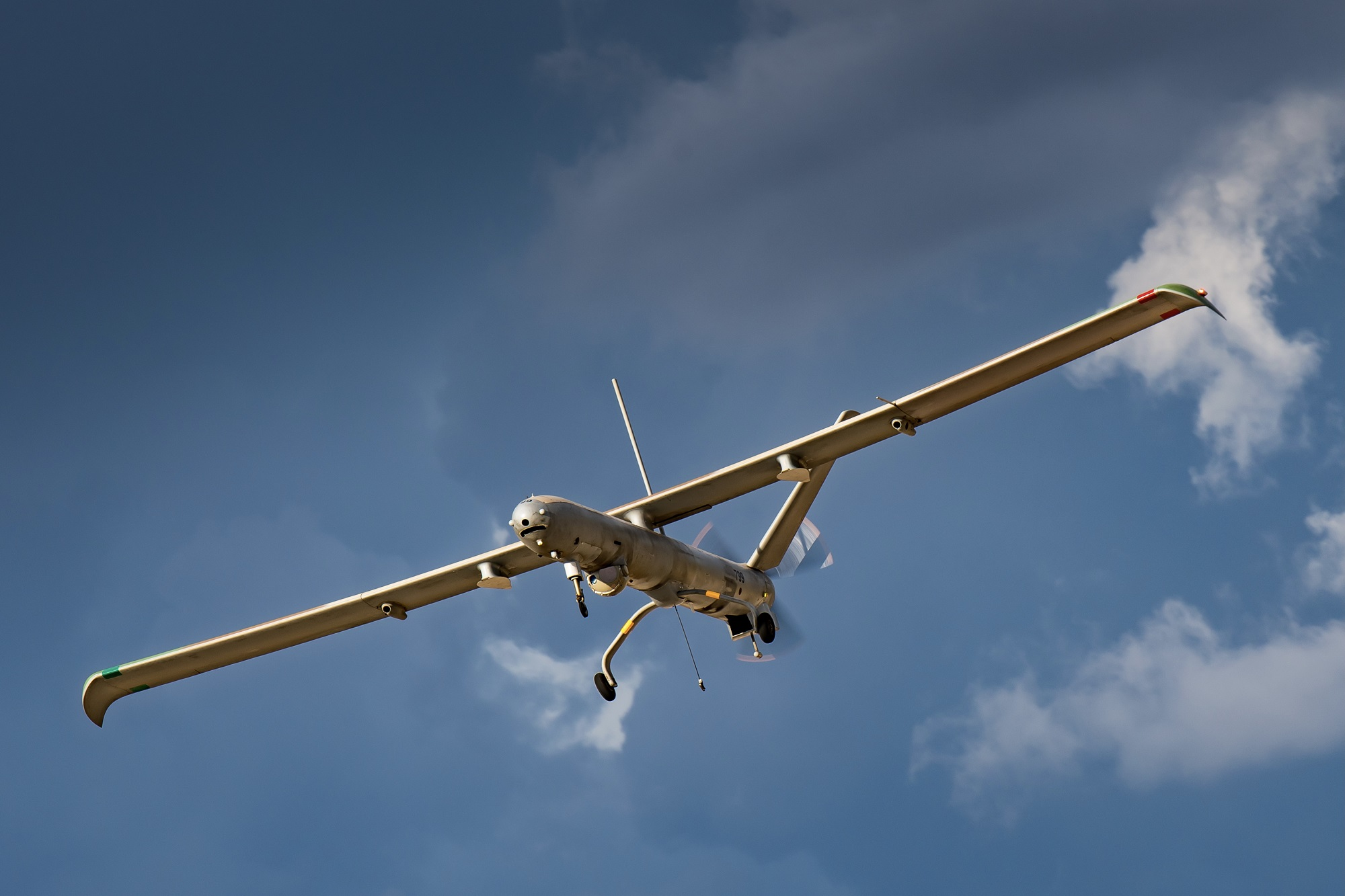
Zik UAV of the Squadron

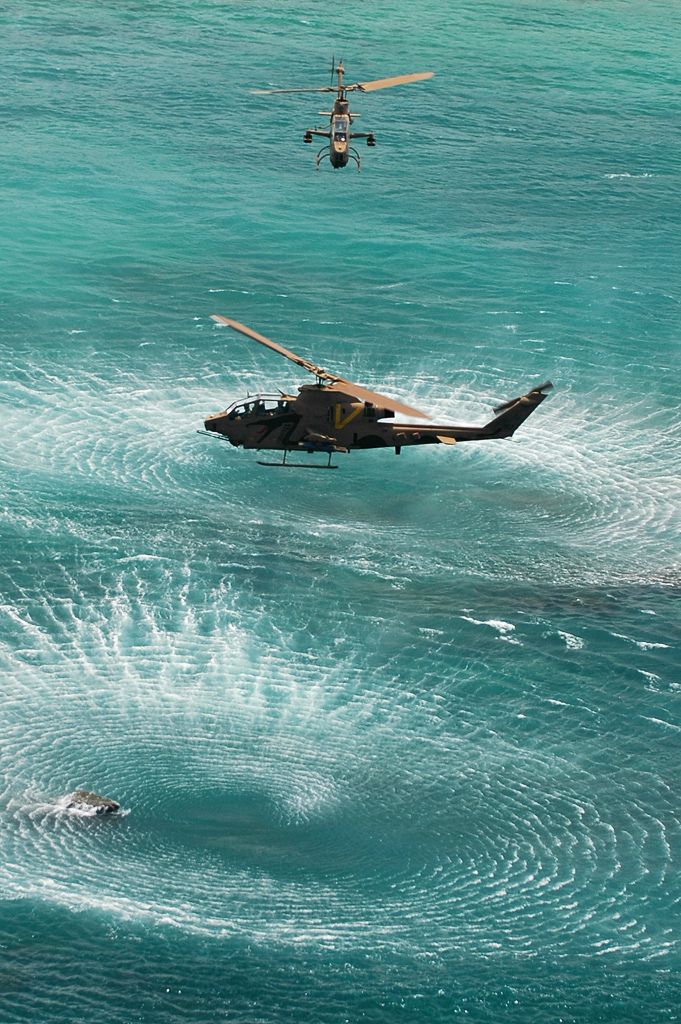
Cobra Helicopter of the squadron

The 161 Squadron of the Israeli Air Force, also known as the Black Snake Squadron, operates Elbit Hermes 450 UAVs. It is based at Palmachim airbase.

It was previously an MD 500 Defender and then an AH-1E/F Cobra helicopter squadron under the name Southern Cobra Squadron.

== Operations during the Israel-Hamas war ==
On Saturday, October 7, 2023, the day of the Hamas surprise attack, the squadron was on alert. At 06:30 the attack began, according to an investigation by Yediot Ahronoth, shortly after that at 06:37 the second squadron launched as armed "Zik" type UAVs, in response to "red color" calls.

Due to the massive damage to the ability Target intelligence, command and control of the IDF by destroying the division headquarters and the brigade headquarters at the Raim base, and other bases in the area, there were almost no targeting factors that could direct the aircraft. In the first hours of the attack, the operators were forced to improvise and act independently, deciding on their own attack targets, with almost no orders, and without them or the central command of the Israeli Air Force understanding the full picture. The officer level in the field initiated steps on its own, in the squadron they did not wait for an orderly order and ordered three more armed Ziks to take off and enter the battle.

By the end of the first day, the squadron had carried out 110 attacks on about a thousand targets, most of them inside Israel.

The squadron was them deployed to the north and launched strikes inside Lebanon during the Israel Hezbollah conflict.
