= Achigvara =

Achigvara აჩიგვარა, Аҽгәара
- Village
- Location within Georgia Location within Abkhazia
- Coordinates: 42.6825°N 41.6332°E
- Country: Georgia
- Partially recognized independent country: Abkhazia
- District: Gali Municipality

Population (2011)
  - Total: 1,032
- Time zone: UTC+3 (MSK)
  - Summer (DST): UTC+4

Achigvara or Achguara (Georgian: აჩიგვარა; Abkhaz: Аҽгәара) is a village in the Gali Municipality/Ochamchira District of Abkhazia, (Note: The political status of Abkhazia is disputed. Having unilaterally declared independence from Georgia in 1992, Abkhazia is formally recognised as an independent state by 4 UN member states (three other states previously recognised it but then withdrew their recognition), while the remainder of the international community recognizes it as de jure Georgian territory. Georgia continues to claim the area as its own territory, designating it as Russian-occupied territory.) Georgia. The 2011 Abkhazian census recorded a population of 1,032 people.

== History ==
On 12 May 2008, the Republic of Abkhazia claimed to have shot down a Georgian Hermes 450 UAV over the village, though Georgia denied the claims.

== Population ==
The 2011 census reported a population of 1,032 in the village. There were 858 Georgians, 74 Abkhaz, 39 Russians, 22 Armenians, 13 Ukrainians, 1 Greek, and 26 others.
