= Shield AI MQ-35 V-BAT =

Type of aircraft

V-BAT (MQ-35A)
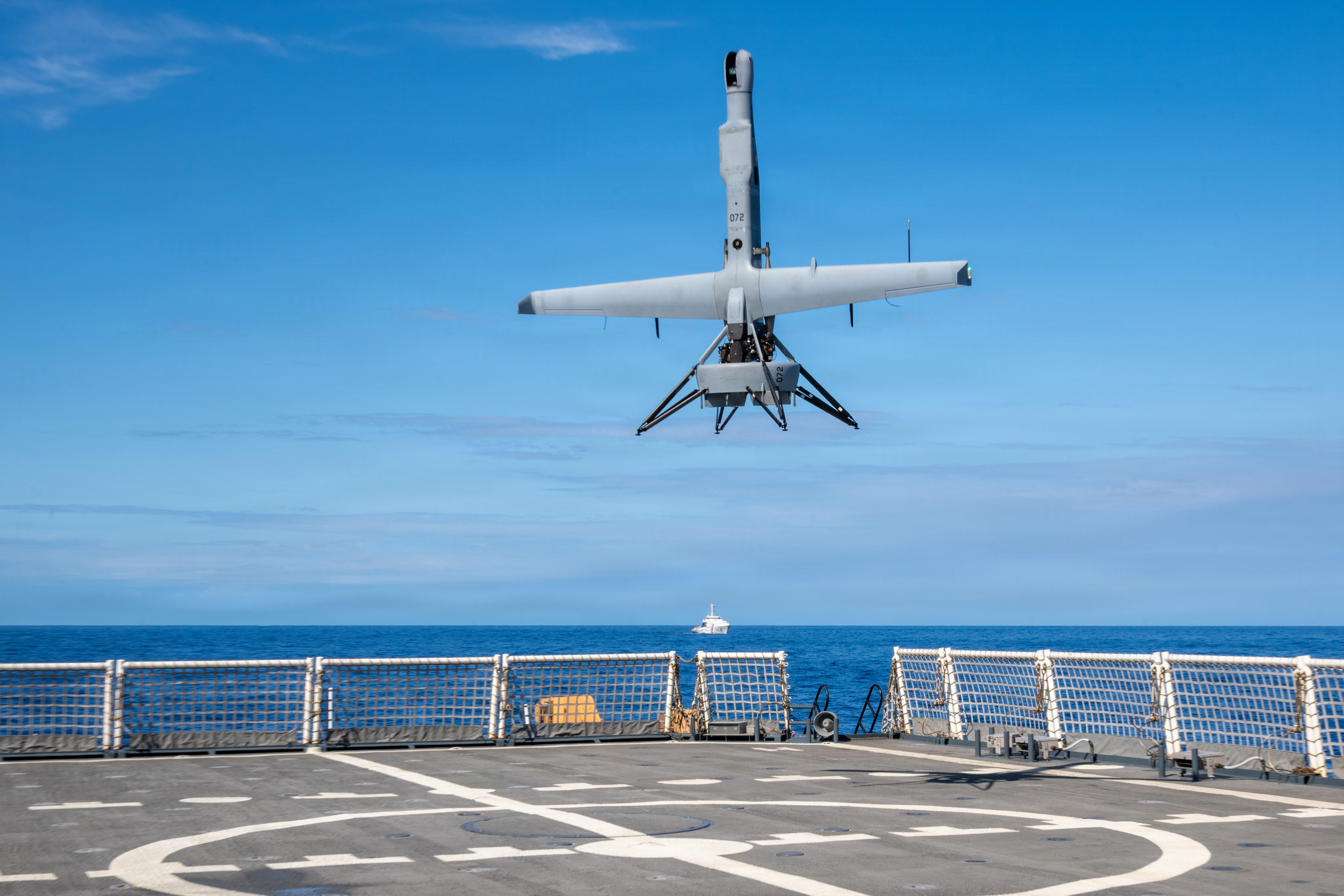
- V-BAT drone lands on USCGC Kimball during RIMPAC

General information
- Type: Unmanned aerial vehicle
- National origin: United States
- Manufacturer: Shield AI
- Status: In service
- Primary user: United States Navy

The Shield AI MQ-35A V-BAT is an American Group 3 vertical take-off and landing (VTOL) unmanned aerial vehicle developed by Martin UAV, now Shield AI. Its single-engine ducted fan tail-sitter design allows it to operate without a runway from ships and other confined land sites. The V-BAT is primarily used for intelligence, surveillance, reconnaissance, and targeting missions.

The aircraft has been adopted by military and maritime organizations in the Americas, Europe, and Asia. Its maritime use includes operations from United States Navy and Coast Guard vessels and a 2026 Frontex and Italian Coast Guard trial from the patrol vessel Dattilo in the central Mediterranean. In Ukraine, V-BATs have operated through Russian electronic warfare (EW) and have been used to collect and relay targeting data for artillery strikes.

== Design and capabilities ==
The V-BAT's single-engine ducted fan enables it to take off and land vertically in confined spaces and to shift from hover to horizontal flight. Its autonomous software, branded as Shield AI’s Hivemind, includes visual odometry navigation capabilities for operating in GPS and communication denied environments. Its compact design and ability to hover makes it suitable for shipboard operations and confined land areas.

In October 2023, Shield AI announced that the V-BAT had achieved drone-swarming capabilities, using Hivemind AI to enable multi-vehicle coordination and distributed autonomous operations.

In April 2025, Shield AI introduced the V-BAT Block 5.3 upgrade, which replaced the earlier gasoline engine with a 33-horsepower heavy-fuel engine compatible with JP-5. The new powerplant increased the aircraft’s maximum payload from 25 to 40 pounds (11.3 to 18.1 kilograms) and improved compatibility with naval and expeditionary fuel systems. The upgrade also incorporated larger fuel tanks, satellite communications, and unassisted vertical takeoff and landing. Shield AI states that the configuration can achieve 12 hours of endurance.

=== Derivatives ===
Aviation Industry Corporation of China (AVIC) subsidiary Chengdu Aircraft Corporation has developed Yunying-25 (Cloud Shadow-25), which Janes described as "externally similar" to the V-BAT. It was first publicly displayed in February 2026. While the developer stated that it is for civilian operations such as urban monitoring, industrial inspection, and emergency response, Janes noted that "its similarity to V-BAT suggests potential military applications, including shipboard surveillance, anti-piracy patrols, and border patrol."

== Operational history ==
=== United States ===
In 2021, the United States Navy gave Shield AI a contract to prototype and develop the V-BAT. On 21 December 2022, a V-BAT and a Skyways V2.6B UAV made the first unmanned cargo deliveries to a U.S. Navy ship at sea. Each UAV carried a cargo of 22.5 kg for 200 nm (370 km).

In March 2023, the United States Army picked the V-BAT to compete in its Future Tactical Unmanned Aircraft System (FTUAS) competition, Increment 2 to replace the RQ-7B Shadow. Shield AI teamed with Northrop Grumman for the competition.

In July 2024, the U.S. Coast Guard awarded Shield AI a $198 million contract to provide maritime unmanned aircraft system services with the V-BAT. This marked one of the largest contractor-owned, contractor-operated UAV deployments for maritime intelligence, surveillance, and reconnaissance (ISR).

V-BAT has deployed with Marine expeditionary units.

In December 2024, Shield and Palantir Technologies announced the deepening of their strategic partnership and deployment of Palantir's Warp Speed for V-BAT manufacturing.

V-BAT was subsequently included on the Defense Contract Management Agency’s Blue UAS Cleared List for operational use. Systems on the list undergo legal, cybersecurity, and supply-chain assessments intended to support military procurement.

=== Brazil ===
In February 2022, Brazilian company VSK Tactical ordered an undisclosed number of V-BATs for security and monitoring roles.

=== Greece ===
Four V-BAT aircraft entered service with the Hellenic Armed Forces in May 2025. In November 2026, Greece ordered an unspecified number of additional systems which are intended for the Hellenic Army and for the Hellenic Navy. The acquisition is conducted through the NATO Support and Procurement Agency.

=== India ===
In November 2024, Shield AI agreed to create a joint venture with JSW Defense and Aerospace to make and test V-BAT drones in India. Under the deal, JSW is to invest $65 million within the year and a total of $90 million over two years to license technology, establish a "global compliance program", build a factory, and train personnel. The construction of a production facility at Maheshwaram near Hyderabad began in December 2025.

In July 2025, the Indian Ministry of Defence was in talks with Shield AI to buy V-BAT drones for the Indian Armed Forces. The initial contract will be worth $35 million, which is the upper limit for an emergency procurement contract. As reported by the Shield AI firm on 28 January 2026, the Indian Army has procured the V-BAT drone as well as the license of the Hivemind autonomous software under an emergency procurement.

=== Japan ===
In January 2025, the V-BAT was selected to operate from warships operated by the Japan Maritime Self-Defense Force.

=== Netherlands ===
In July 2025, the Dutch Ministry of Defence bought an initial twelve V-BAT unmanned aircraft systems to improve maritime ISR operations for the Royal Netherlands Navy and Marine Corps.

=== Romania ===
In 2025, it was announced that Romania was to receive a V-BAT system consisting of four drones as a donation from the United States through the Maritime Domain Awareness initiative. The first demonstration of the V-BAT drone in Romania took place on 26 March 2026 aboard the frigate Regina Maria, in the presence of the US Ambassador to Romania and the leadership of the Romanian Ministry of Defense.

The delivery of the first system is to be completed by the second quarter of 2026. Subsequently, a further two systems (eight drones in total) will be acquired by the Romanian Naval Forces through a Government-to-Government contract.

=== Frontex ===
In 2026, ahead of a Frontex maritime pilot project in the central Mediterranean, the Italian Civil Aviation Authority issued Global Sat Tech a Specific Assurance and Integrity Level III authorization under the European Union Aviation Safety Agency’s Specific Category framework for beyond-visual-line-of-sight maritime operations using V-BAT. The authorization applied to the operator’s approved procedures and designated operating area.

From June to July 2026, two V-BATs operated from the Italian Coast Guard patrol vessel Dattilo during the Frontex pilot project. The aircraft completed 150 flight hours over 19 days and operated simultaneously for a combined 20 hours per day at peak tempo. Flights reached distances of 150 kilometers from the ship, and the trial included a search-and-rescue simulation in which a V-BAT located a small inflatable boat.

== Operators ==
- Colombia
  - Colombian Navy – Three V-BAT systems received in 2024 and subsequently deployed for maritime surveillance operations.
- Greece
  - Hellenic Army – V-BAT systems entered service in May 2025.
- Indonesia
  - Kopassus, Indonesian Army – Operated by Group 5.
- Japan
  - Japan Maritime Self-Defense Force – First aircraft delivered in December 2025.
- Netherlands
  - Royal Netherlands Navy – Twelve aircraft acquired for operation from eight naval vessels.
- Romania
  - Romanian Naval Forces – One system (four aircraft) funded through a United States grant in service since 2026; two additional systems have been requested.
- Ukraine
  - Unmanned Systems Forces – Used for training and operational missions in electronic-warfare environments.

=== Future operators ===
- Argentina
  - Argentine Navy – Three systems planned for delivery by the end of 2026.
- Armenia
  - Armed Forces of Armenia – On order.
- Greece
  - Hellenic Army – Twelve additional aircraft planned.
  - Hellenic Navy – Eight aircraft planned.
- India
  - Indian Army – On order.
- Poland
  - Polish Navy – One system comprising several aircraft on order, with delivery planned for late 2026.
- Taiwan
  - Republic of China Navy – In August 2026, Taiwan launched a four-year procurement program for 280 V-BAT UAVs, 140 control systems, and 82 transport vehicles, corresponding to two drones per control system and three to four drones per transport vehicle.
  - Coast Guard Administration – One delivered. Eleven aircraft on order.

== Accidents and incidents ==
In April 2024, a V-BAT partially severed three fingers of a US Navy sailor who was helping it to land. Following this incident, US military customers imposed restrictions on its flight, while they investigated this matter for several months. Later, Shield AI modified the V-BAT so that it no longer required human assistance to launch and land.

In June 2026, Reuters reported that 50 of 200 upgraded V-BATs operated by Shield AI had been destroyed in accidents.

== Specifications ==
General characteristics

- Crew: None
- Length: 12.5 ft (3.8 m)
- Wingspan: 9.6 ft (2.9 m)
- Gross weight: 165 lb (75 kg)
- Powerplant: 1 × Heavy Fuel Engine (JP5)

Performance

- Maximum speed: 56 mph (90 km/h, 49 kn)
- Endurance: 12+ hours
- Service ceiling: 18,000 ft (5,500 m)

Avionics
Electro-optical (EO)/Mid-wave infrared (MWIR) cameras

== See also ==
- Rudrastra
- Wingtra WingtraOne
- Elbit Hermes 450
