= Wingtra WingtraOne =

Tail-sitting vertical take-off and landing unmanned aerial vehicle

WingtraOne
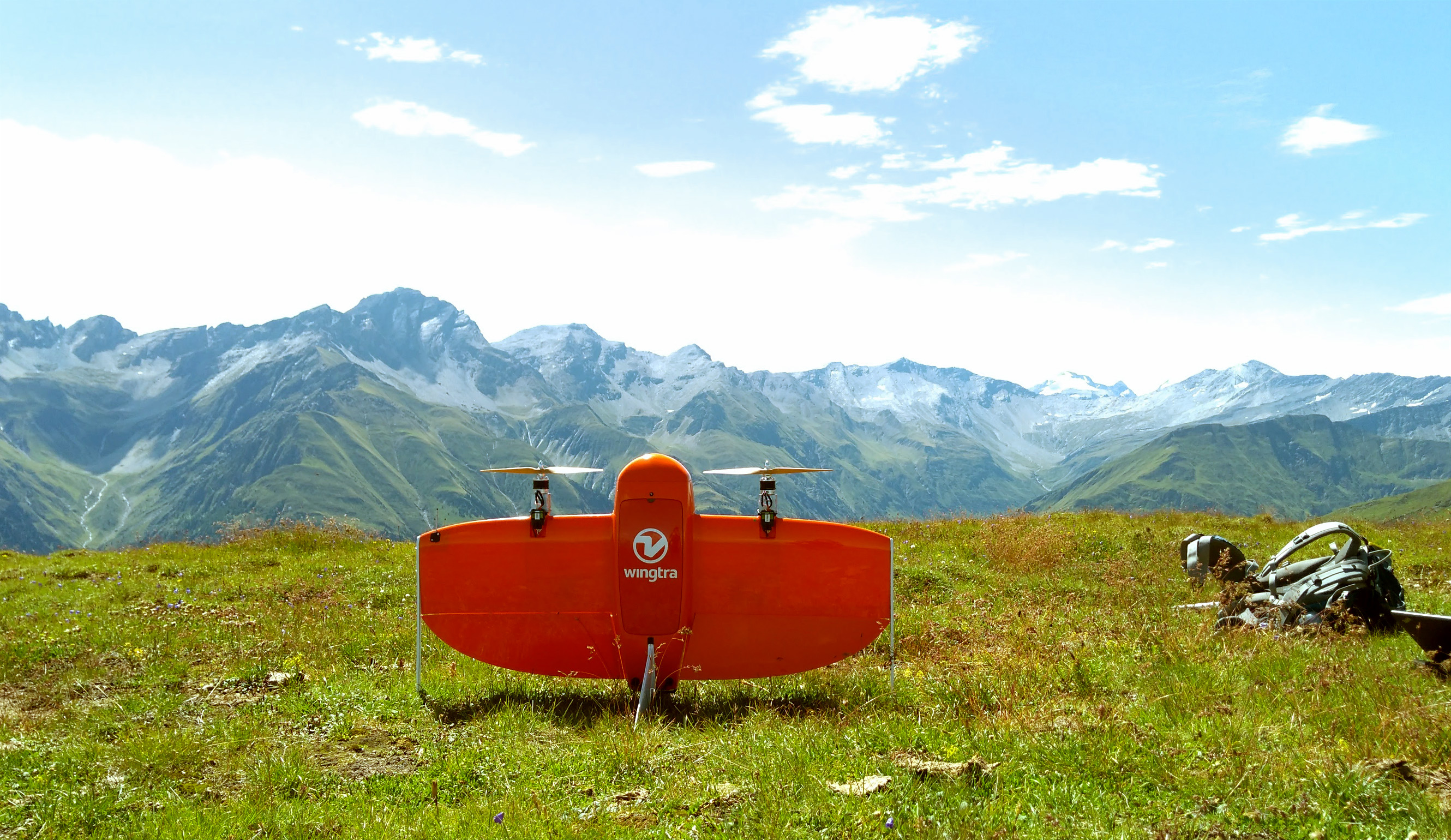
- WingtraOne production model

General information
- Type: Utility drone
- National origin: Switzerland
- Manufacturer: Wingtra

History
- Manufactured: 2017-
- First flight: 2015

The Wingtra WingtraOne is a tail-sitting vertical take-off and landing unmanned aerial vehicle developed in Switzerland by Wingtra AG. Powered by two electric motors, it is designed primarily for use in precision agriculture and surveying roles, or for light payload delivery to rural areas.

== Design and development ==
In 2013, development of WingtraOne began under the name "PacFlyer" as a "Focus Project" at the Autonomous Systems Lab at ETH Zurich, under the guidance of Roland Siegwart. The product was spun off to a division also named Wingtra.

The main focus of the design effort was on controllability, traditionally a challenge in the design of a tail-sitter aircraft, particularly due to attitude estimation. The flight controller for WingtraOne was developed by 2016, which used a pitot tube, inertial navigation system consisting of multiple gyroscopes, accelerometers, and magnetometers, and GPS; the WingtraOne design was also modified for improved resistance to wind during that year, and the control algorithm to ensure smooth transition from vertical flight to forward flight was developed.

In March 2016, a prototype was shown at the CeBIT technology show in Hanover, Germany.

Following the completion of development and flight trials, the WingtraOne entered series production in 2017 and said it was looking to expand into the United States. In October 2017, Wingtra AG entered a partnership with Pix4D, a photogrammetry company, to offer postprocessing of images along with aerial data collection.

The WingtraOne has a flying wing configuration; the drone has an endurance of 55 minutes, power being provided by an eight-cell lithium-ion battery to two electric motors. A tail-sitter, the aircraft takes off vertically while being supported by wing and tail fins, and once in flight, it tilts forward to fly horizontally.

== Operational history ==
WingtraOne collects high resolution aerial data which is used to generate orthophotos, 3D reconstructions, point cloud and NDVI maps; the drone is capable of covering 390 hectares (960 acres) at an altitude of 240 metres (790 ft) at 3 cm/px GSD. It has been trialled in the aerial surveying, agriculture and glacier monitoring roles, as well as light payload delivery to rural areas.

The WingtraOne was awarded the Swiss Excellence Product Award in 2016.

== Specifications ==
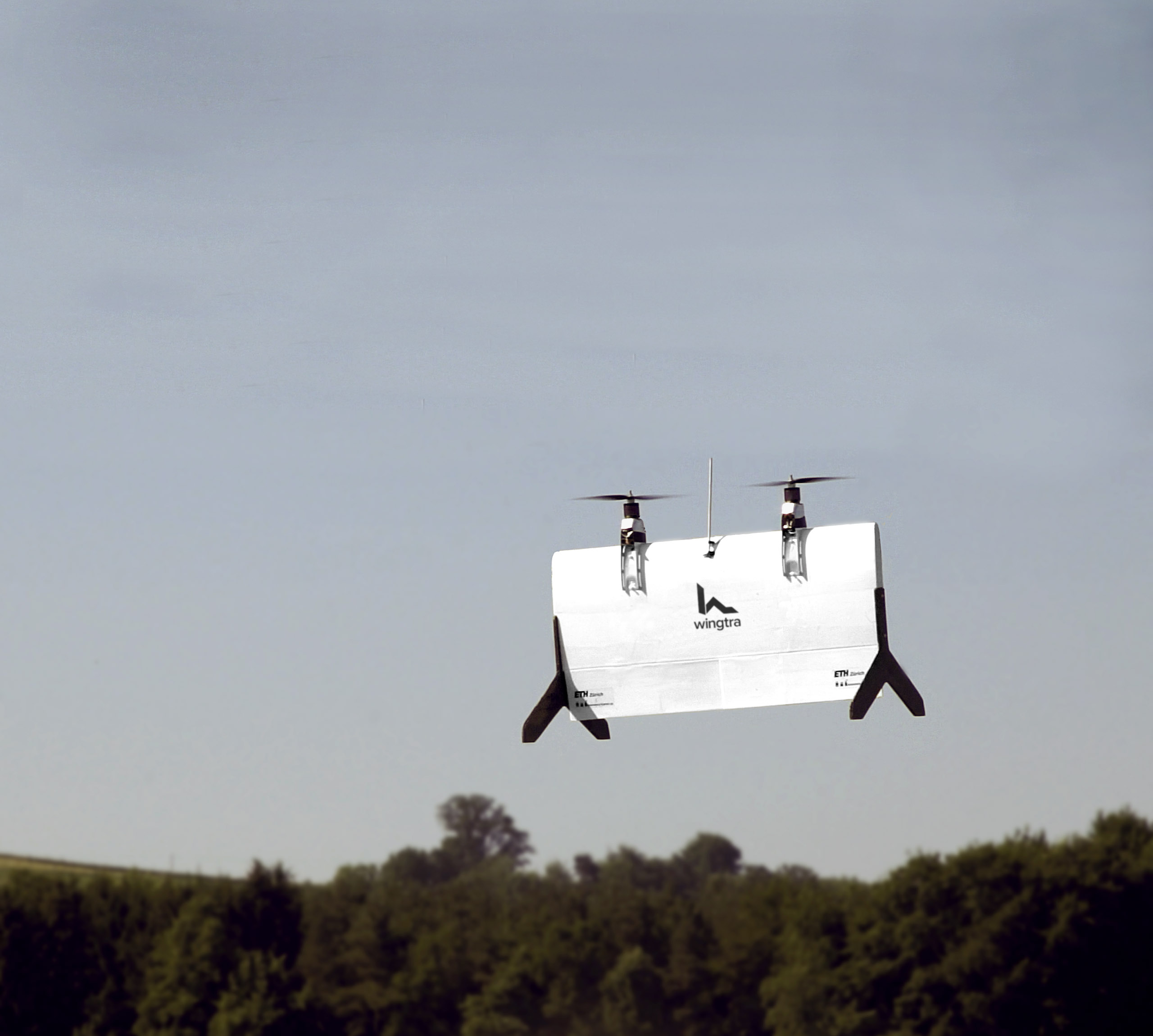
WingtraOne prototype

Data from DroneMajor.net

General characteristics

- Capacity: 800 grams (1.8 lb) payload
- Wingspan: 1.50 m (4 ft 11 in)
- Empty weight: 3.6 kg (8 lb)
- Max takeoff weight: 4.4 kg (10 lb)

Performance

- Cruise speed: 55 km/h (34 mph, 30 kn)
- Endurance: 55 minutes

== See also ==
- Shield AI MQ-35 V-BAT
- Rudrastra
- Elbit Hermes 450
