= 2008 Georgian drone shootdowns =

- Part of Prelude to the Russian invasion of Georgia
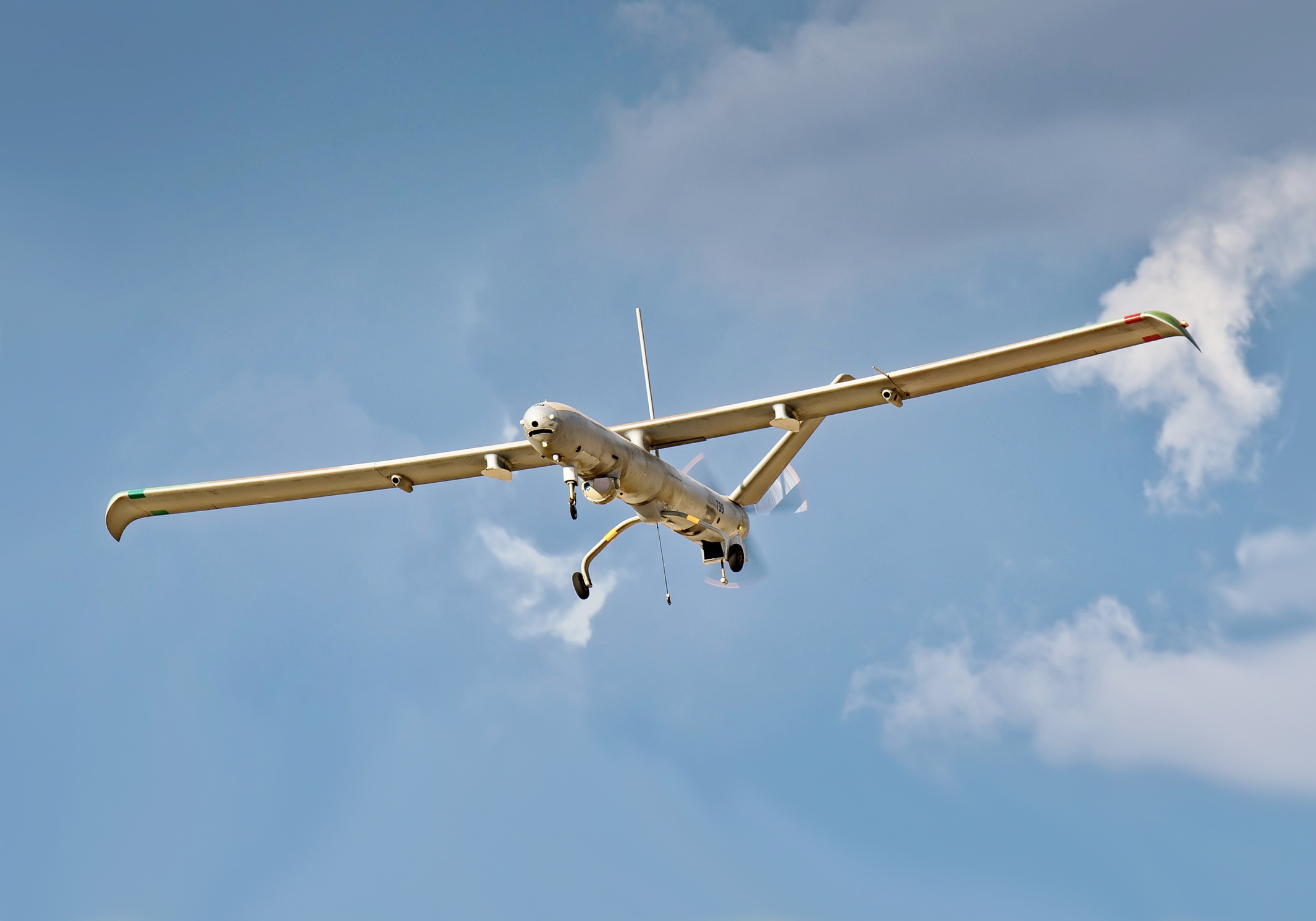
- Elbit Hermes 450, the model of the drones shot down over Abkhazia
- Location: Gali and Ochamchire districts (Abkhazia)
- Objective: Neutralization of Georgia's aerial reconnaissance operations over Abkhazia
- Date: March 18, 2008–May 12, 2008
- Executed by: Abkhazian Air Force; Russian Air Force
- Outcome: Shootdown of three to seven Georgian reconnaissance UAVs, end of Georgian drone use over Abkhazia

The 2008 Georgian drone shootdowns refer to a series of military incidents involving Georgian Unmanned aerial vehicles brought down over the breakaway republic of Abkhazia between March and May 2008. The skirmishes were part of a larger context of tensions between Georgia and Russia, eventually leading up to the Russo-Georgian War.

Georgia's drone program was developed in 2007 when the Georgian government purchased dozens of unmanned aircraft from the Israeli Elbit Systems, using the drones to fly over Abkhazia and document Russian military movements in the region. In February and March 2008, as Moscow increased its ties with the separatist region, Georgia intensified its drone surveillance program. The first drone shootdown took place allegedly on March 18 over the Gali district.

According to Abkhaz claims, as many as seven Georgian drones were shot down in five different operations between the Gali and Ochamchire districts of Abkhazia. Georgia only admitted to three incidents, including the April 20 shootdown over the village of Gagida. The latter triggered an investigation by the United Nations that revealed the drone was brought down by a Russian military jet.

The UN accused both Georgia and Russia of violating the 1994 Moscow Ceasefire Agreement that had put an end to the Abkhazia War, Georgia by using drones over the conflict zone and Russia by shooting them down, although Tbilisi argued its surveillance program was justified to observe Russia's own militarization of the region. On May 30, Georgia announced an end to its drone program, but that failed to bring down tensions in the subsequent months.

== Background ==
=== Georgian-Abkhazian conflict ===
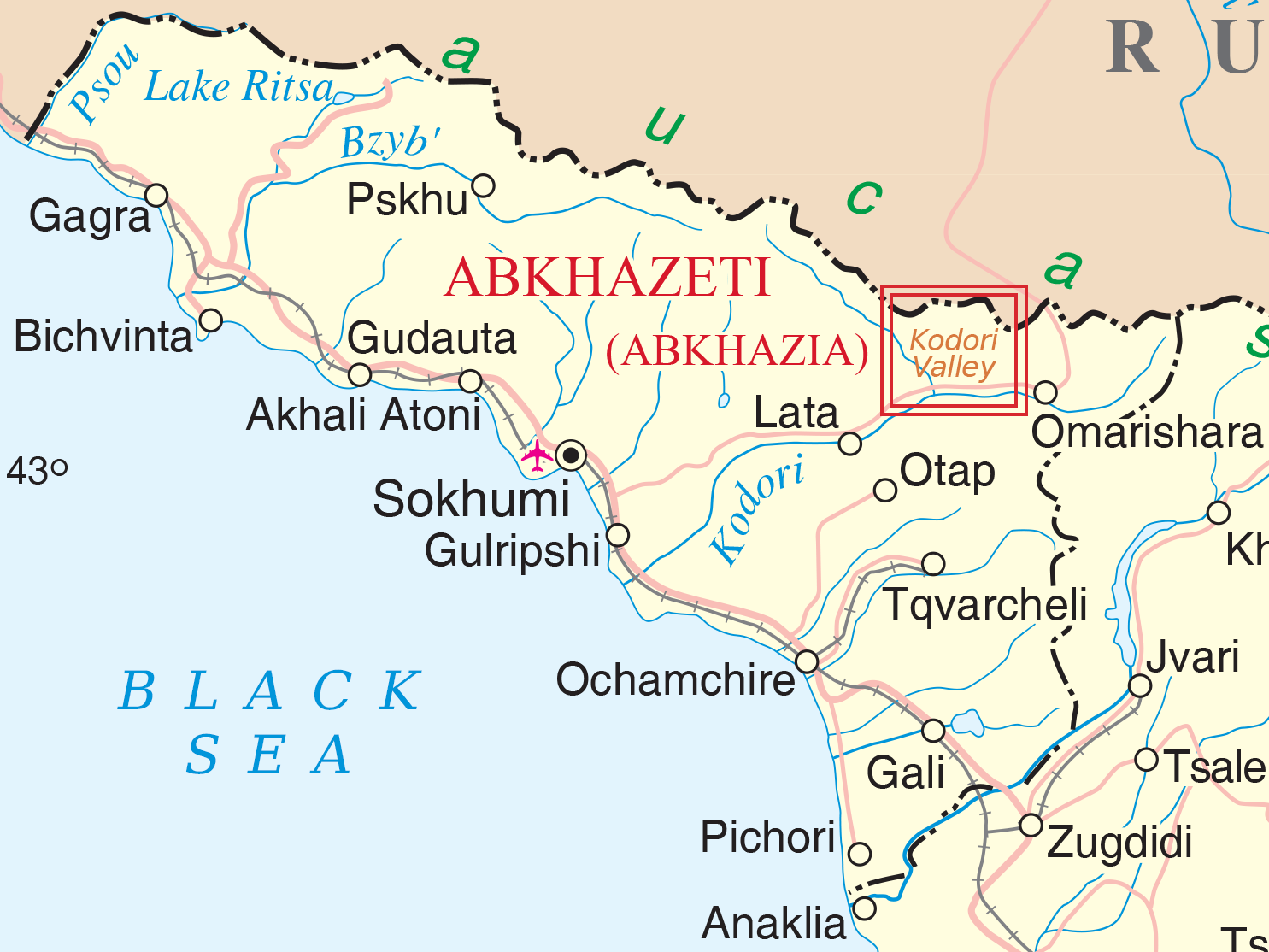
Map of Abkhazia, including the Kodori Gorge.

Though originating in the late 1980s, the conflict between Georgia and its breakaway region of Abkhazia seemingly devolved following the 2006 Kodori crisis, when the Georgian central government reestablished its control over the warlord-held Kodori Gorge in northeastern Abkhazia, leading to accusations by separatist Abkhaz forces of a Georgian militarization of the region. Tensions escalated in September 2007 with the Bokhundjara incident, when a clash between Abkhaz troops and Georgian police caused the death of two Russian military advisers working with the separatists.

Mikheil Saakashvili, the staunchly pro-Western President of Georgia in office since the 2003 Rose Revolution, is inaugurated for a second term on January 20, 2008, promising during his inauguration speech the "peaceful reintegration of Abkhazia and South Ossetia into Georgia," a pledge that comes after a campaign promise to return to Abkhazia Georgian IDPs displaced during the 1993 ethnic cleansing. In response, Russia, which had been providing de facto support to Abkhaz separatists, called on Tbilisi to sign a Treaty of Non-Use of Force with Abkhazia, even though the Saakashvili administration refused to sign any treaty with separatist forces.

On February 26, a breakthrough was announced by President Saakashvili, who claimed having reached a deal with Russia to open a joint checkpoint on the Psou river, at the Abkhaz section of the Georgian-Russian border. However, Russia rapidly denied having reached a deal and tensions increased thereafter. The same day, Abkhazia announced military exercises, while a Georgian journalist was arrested by Abkhaz forces on the ceasefire line, before being tortured in Sokhumi. On February 29, Abkhaz de facto President Sergei Baghapsh announced a partial mobilization of his troops. And on March 6, Russia formally withdrew from a 1996 Abkhazia embargo treaty. At a Georgian National Security Council meeting held in response, Mikheil Saakashvili stated that Georgia would have a "zero tolerance policy" towards the militarization of Abkhazia.

In later analytical documents, the Georgian government would describe the March 6 decision by Russia to be the start of the prelude of the Russia-Georgia War, while both Tbilisi and the Bush Administration in the United States warned at the time that the lifting of sanctions on Abkhazia was an excuse by Russia to deliver military hardware to the region. Russian officials at the time linked the Kremlin's policy towards Abkhazia to a response of Georgia's attempt to join NATO. On March 14, Abkhaz officials announced it would reject any attempted negotiations with the Georgian government as long as its troops remained stationed in the Kodori Gorge. Days later, President Saakashvili travelled to New York City to present a new peace plan to UN Secretary General Ban Ki-moon, before announcing a proposal to create a joint Abkhaz-Georgian police force in the ethnically-Georgian district of Gali in Abkhazia.

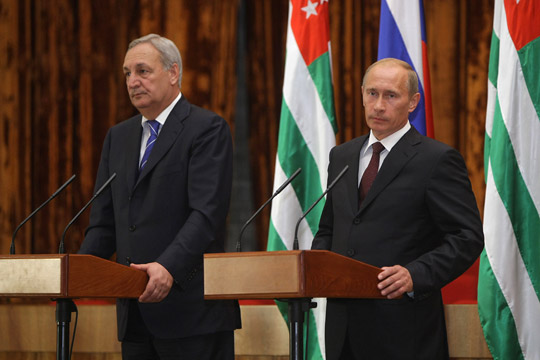
Sergei Baghapsh and Vladimir Putin at a press conference (2009).

On April 16, Russian President Vladimir Putin signed an executive order legalizing relations between the Russian Federation and Abkhazia. A day later, Georgian intelligence noted the arrival of 300 Russian soldiers at a military base in Ochamchire, which Western powers called an "escalation". According to Abkhaz reports provided to the European Union's Fact-Finding Mission following the Russia-Georgia War (IIFFMCG), this decision by Putin provided an excuse for Georgian intelligence activities to increase in southern Abkhazia, especially in the Gali and Tkvarcheli regions, where Tbilisi looked for possible troops deployment routes, fording sites across the Enguri river, and preparedness levels. Part of that intelligence activity included drone flights to "methodically collect intelligence data, monitor key strategic facilities, and obtain information pertaining to the deployment of the Abkhaz Armed Forces." Saakashvili later told The New York Times that Russia had secretly expanded military aid to Abkhazia, staging aircraft inside the region and assigning trainers to Abkhaz ground units.

=== Rising Russo-Georgian tensions ===
Tensions between Georgia and the Russian Federation had existed ever since the collapse of the Soviet Union. The pro-Western orientation of the Saakashvili administration following the Rose Revolution heightened those tensions, while Tbilisi and Moscow navigated through several diplomatic crises, most notably the 2006 espionage scandal. In 2007, Russia was accused by Tbilisi of two airborne attacks on Georgian positions in Abkhazia, leading to Georgia calling for an internationalization of the Russian peacekeeping force in the conflict zone.

The issue of Kosovo's independence contributed to a worsening of ties, with the Kremlin declaring in early 2008 that the recognition of Kosovo by Western powers would "set an international precedent", hinting at Russia's own relations with the breakaway regions of Abkhazia and South Ossetia. On the eve of Kosovo's declaration of independence, President Saakashvili called on Russian President Vladimir Putin "not to play with fire". Despite a war of words, a summit of Saakashvili and Putin was held in Moscow on February 21 and tentative deals were announced to lower tensions. A potential détente was however prevented by Russia's decision to unilaterally withdraw from the CIS embargo on Abkhazia on March 6, as well as Georgia's commitment to seek NATO membership at the April Bucharest Summit. On May 3, Saakashvili used the term "occupation" for the first time to describe Russia's military presence in Abkhazia.

== Georgian drone program ==
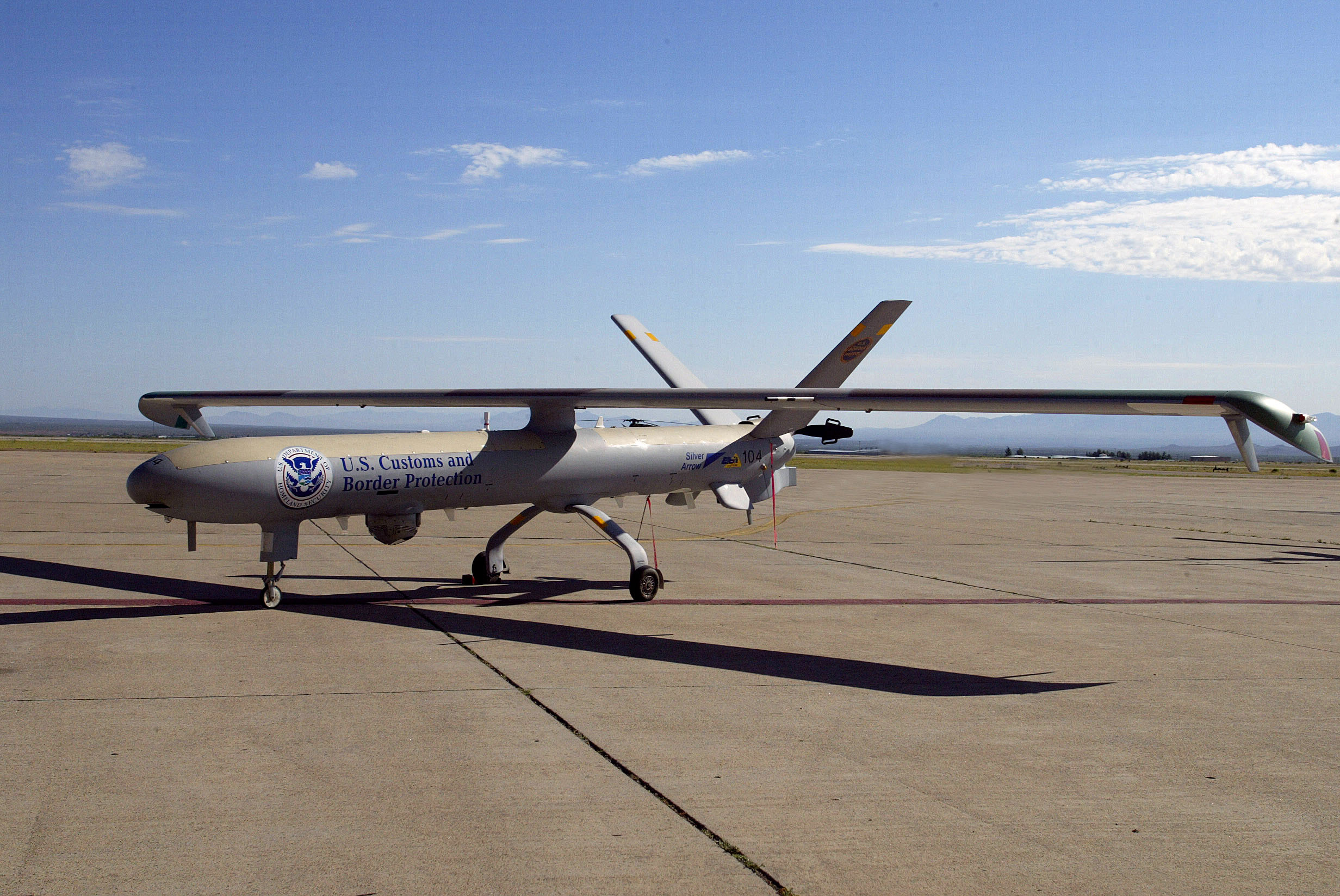
An Elbit Hermes 450, operated by the US Customs and Border Protection.

Georgia incorporated the use of Unmanned aerial vehicles within its internal security apparatus since at least 2007, when the Georgian Ministry of Defense signed a contract with the Israeli military manufacturer Elbit Systems (although Abkhaz authorities alleged the manufacturing of the drones started in 2006). Though the details of the contract were never confirmed, reports from the shot drones revealed them to be Elbit Hermes 450 models. The deployment of the UAVs by Georgia's Defense and Interior Ministries dates back to August 2007, though they were first mentioned in October during a press conference by Abkhaz de facto President Sergei Baghapsh, who threatened to shoot down any drone flying over the region. In November, Georgian Foreign Minister Gela Bezhuashvili confirmed Georgia's acquisition of Israeli-made drones during an interview with The Jamestown Foundation, although President Saakashvili refused to comment on his minister's comments. The Georgian Ministry of Defense first confirmed its possession of drones when denying the March 18 shoot-down.

On April 22, two days after a Georgian drone was shot down by a Russian military jet, Mikheil Saakashvili discussed the extent of Georgia's drone program in an interview with The New York Times, confirming the purchase of 40 Israeli-made UAVs. Reports by Sokhumi claimed those drones carried optical infrared and laser sensors, and data transfer systems capable of transmitting images in real time to command and control centers on the ground, were designed to carry out surveillance, patrolling, reconnaissance, and fire adjustment missions, and were capable of detecting any movement from a distance of 25 km, reading registration plates, transmitting photographs of passengers, and identifying weapons. Abkhazian authorities noted at least 16 cases of UAV flights over the region between August 2007 and March 2008.

Georgian reconnaissance flights over Abkhazia reportedly increased following Russia's withdrawal from the CIS embargo treaty and its subsequent opening of diplomatic ties with the separatist republics in March 2008. Georgian military experts believed that the key task of the Georgian drones was to confirm the deployment of Buk missile systems in Abkhazia, while Tbilisi stated its use of drones was to engage in reconnaissance of Russian and Abkhaz military movements. Georgian Interior Ministry spokesperson Shota Utiashvili confirmed in May that the drones were "conducting reconnaissance of the Abkhaz territory to identify where the Russian and Abkhaz armed forces and military hardware are concentrated." Drone footage released on May 12 by the MIA showed what Tbilisi claimed to be movement and deployment of Russian troops and military equipment within the region. The UN Observer Mission in Georgia (UNOMIG) reported several drone flights over the Kodori Gorge, but could not confirm if those UAVs were of Russian or Georgian origin. Sokhumi continuously condemned drone flights over Abkhazia, claiming they were used to draw up maps for a potential Georgian attack scenario. A UNOMIG investigation found the Georgian drone flights to be in violation of the 1994 Moscow Ceasefire Agreement that banned military hardware, including for reconnaissance purposes, from the region. Even though the same investigation confirmed that illegal Russian military aid to Abkhaz separatists, Georgia suspended its drone flights over Abkhazia on May 30.

Several reports of Georgian drone flights over Abkhazia were made by separatist authorities in 2009, although Tbilisi vehemently denied them and independent reports could not confirm those allegations.

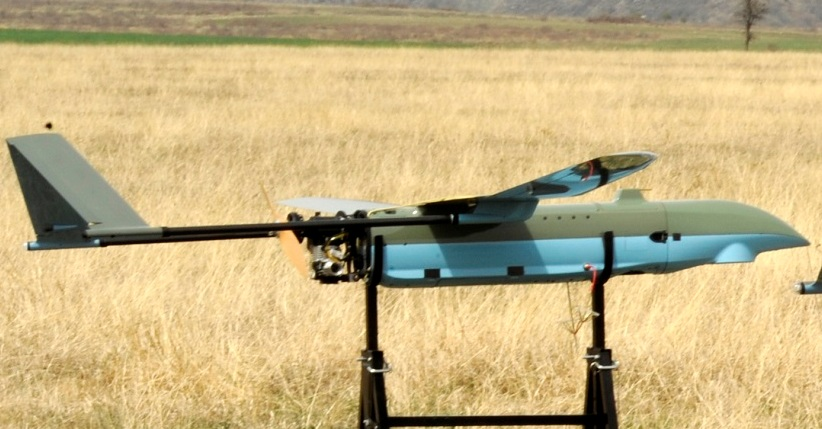
Georgian-made SWAN III drone.

Journalist Nicholas Clayton later called the Russia-Georgia war "the world's first two-sided drone war", with Georgia's UAV capabilities surpassing Russia's outdated, Soviet-era fleet, with its Elbit Hermes 450 fleet inspired by the US-made General Atomics MQ-1 Predator. Georgia's advantage ended in 2009 when Israel started manufacturing drones for Russia.

Emails by the intelligence corporation Stratfor leaked by WikiLeaks revealed that Georgia believed Israel had provided Moscow with the data link codes for its drone fleet, allowing Russia to hack them and force crash them in exchange for Russian intelligence on the Tor-M1 missile systems it had sold Iran. Shortly before the Russia-Georgia War, Russia hinted it would sell advanced weapons to Iran if Israel did not stop its military cooperation with Georgia, which it would later do days before the war. Elbit Systems would later sue the Georgian government for its refusal to pay for previously-purchased hardware, and Georgia was made to settle for 35 million dollars. By 2012, Georgia started manufacturing its own line of drones with the assistance of Estonian military development company ELI. The SWAN III, developed jointly by ELI and the Georgian-based STC Delta, became operational in 2012 and Saakashvili admitted for the first time the reasons why his government ended military cooperation with Israel during a speech in 2013. After the defeat of Saakashvili's party in the 2012 parliamentary elections, the new Georgian government led by Bidzina Ivanishvili restored commercial ties with Elbit Systems.

== Incidents ==
=== Full timeline ===
- March 6: Russia withdraws from the 1996 CIS Treaty on Abkhazia Sanctions, triggering condemnations by Georgia and concerns about illegal military trade between Moscow and Sokhumi.

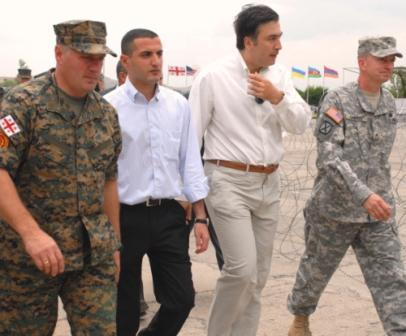
Mikheil Saakashvili walking with top US and Georgian military leaderships.

- March 14: Abkhazian separatist authorities reject any conflict resolution negotiation with Tbilisi and demands the withdrawal of Georgian troops from the Kodori Gorge.
- March 18: Abkhazian separatists claim shooting down a Georgian UAV over the village of Primorskoe, near the Georgian-populated region of Gali. Tbilisi denies the drone's shootdown but confirms its reconnaissance flights over Abkhazia. Moscow condemns what it calls a violation of the 1994 Ceasefire Agreement.
- March 20: The People's Assembly of Abkhazia issues a statement condemning "systematic flights of Georgian aircraft over Abkhaz airspace for reconnaissance purposes" as proof that Tbilisi is "taking a course towards preparation for another military invasion of the Republic of Abkhazia."
- March 21: The State Duma passes a resolution calling on the Kremlin "to consider the expediency of recognizing the independence of Abkhazia and South Ossetia" and to review the feasibility of increasing the Russian peacekeeping force in Abkhazia.
- March 26: PACE Co-Rapporters on Georgia Matyas Erosi and Kastriot Islami visit Georgia among other things to discuss "recent developments in relation to Abkhazia and South Ossetia."
- March 28: Mikheil Saakashvili unveils a new peace plan for Abkhazia, including a joint Georgian-Abkhaz Free Economic Zone in Ochamchire and Gali, the creation of the post of Vice-President of Georgia to be allocated to a representative of Abkhazia with the right to veto all decisions by the central government on its constitutional status, specific security guarantees, and "unlimited autonomy." The proposal is immediately rejected by Sokhumi.
- April 3: In a letter to Abkhazia's Sergei Baghapsh and South Ossetia's Eduard Kokoity, Vladimir Putin writes that "Russia can not ignore Tbilisi’s line directed towards destabilization of the situation, including through use of intimidation and force – including through appealing to non-regional states."
- April 4: NATO Bucharest Summit Declaration, pledging the future NATO accession of Georgia and Ukraine, but refusing to grant either a Membership Action Plan.
- April 15: The UN Security Council adopts Resolution 1808, extending UNOMIG's mandate till October and calling for the return of Georgian IDPs to Abkhazia.
- April 17: Putin signs an executive order establishing direct diplomatic ties between Russia, Abkhazia and South Ossetia. The decree leads to widespread condemnation by Georgia and its international partners.
- April 20: Georgian UAV is shot down over the village of Gagida in the Gali district. Tbilisi acknowledges the loss of a drone and blames Russia, releasing footage showing a Russian aircraft shooting an air-to-air missiles at the UAV. Both Russia and Abkhazia deny Moscow's involvement, instead alleging the drone was brought down by the Abkhaz Armed Forces. A later UN investigation confirms Georgia's accusation against Russia, while Russia accuses Georgia of violating the 1994 Ceasefire Agreement.

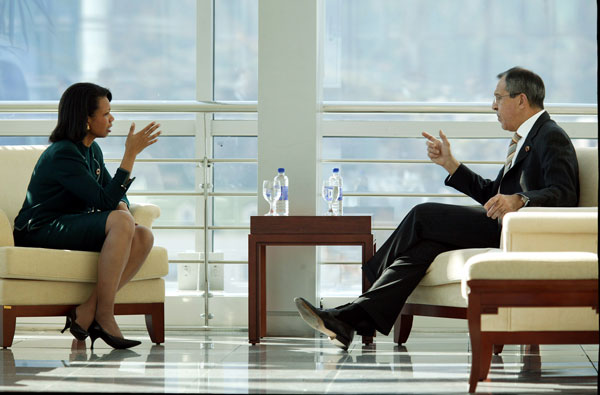
Meeting of Condolezza Rice and Sergei Lavrov.

- April 21: Mikheil Saakashvili and Vladimir Putin hold a phone conversation described as "not easy". During the discussion, Saakashvili calls on Russia to "stop attacks on Georgia", while Putin "expressed bewilderment" over the UAV flights.
- April 22: U.S. State Secretary Condolezza Rice and her Russian counterpart Sergei Lavrov meet in Kuwait and talk about the drone shoot down in Abkhazia.
- April 23: UN Security Council session is held at the request of Georgia to discuss the drone downing. The US, the United Kingdom, France, and Germany issue a joint call expressing their concern over Russia's move to establish ties with Abkhazia and South Ossetia.
- April 24: In a televised national address, President Saakashvili announces seeking to replace Russian peacekeepers in Abkhazia with an international mission. The number of Russian forces stationed in Abkhazia increases from 2,000 to 2,540. The Kremlin uses the Georgian drone flights to justify the need for more peacekeepers.
- April 29: Moscow announces an increase in Russian peacekeeping troops after accusing Georgia of increasing its own military presence in the Kodori Gorge.
- April 30:
  - Separatist leaders Sergei Baghapsh and Eduard Kokoity reject the Georgian proposal to form a confederacy with Abkhazia and South Ossetia.
  - The OSCE Permanent Council holds an emergency session over the April 20 drone incidents. A special Forum for Security Cooperation is called by the Finnish Presidency, which endorses the UN-led investigative effort.
  - The NATO and Russian Ambassadors meet in Brussels over the Abkhazia crisis.
  - The People's Assembly of Abkhazia calls on the Abkhaz separatists leadership to withdraw from the Geneva Process, a format of negotiations between Tbilisi and Sokhumi mediated by France, Germany, the United Kingdom, Russia, and the US.
  - Secretary General Terry Davis of the Council of Europe call on Georgia and Russia to "do everything in their power to prevent any further deterioration of the situation with negative consequences for the local population and stability in the region."
- May 3: Saakashvili used the term "occupation" to describe Russia's military presence in Abkhazia for the first time.
- May 4: Abkhaz separatists allege shooting down another two Georgian drones flying over the Gali district. Georgia denies the claim, but Russia backs Sokhumi's allegations. Instead, Tbilisi recognizes the extent of its drone program and pledges to continue flying UAVs over Abkhazia.
- May 5:
  - Sokhumi claims detecting another Georgian UAV flying over the Ochamchire district, but claims having willingly not shot it down.
  - Georgia withdraws from the 1995 Agreement on the Creation of the Integrated Air Defense System of CIS Member States, urging the United Nations to investigate the presence and use of air defense systems by separatist authorities in Abkhazia.
- May 6: The White House formally backs Georgia in its claim that Russia downed the Georgian UAV on April 20.
- May 8: Abkhazia claims having shot down a fifth Georgian UAV, a claim denied again by Tbilisi. According to Sokhumi, the drone carried an air-to-air missiles, though Georgian military equipment did not include missile-carrying drones.
- May 12:
  - Abkhazia announces having shot down an additional two Georgian drones, one of which is confirmed by Tbilisi. These are the last drone shootdown allegations made by Abkhazia before the launch of the Russia-Georgia War.
  - George W. Bush speaks to his new Russian counterpart Dmitry Medvedev in their first phone conversation after the latter's inauguration. They speak extensively about the Abkhazia crisis.
  - Georgia's UN Ambassador Irakli Alasania visits Sokhumi and meets with separatist officials to seek a negotiated conflict settlement.
  - Tbilisi releases drone footage claiming to prove Russian troop and military hardware deployment in Abkhazia.
  - President Saakashvili calls on the European Union to launch a formal investigation on the Russian use of force to down Georgian drones over Georgian recognized airspace.
- May 15: The UN General Assembly votes in favor of a Georgia-sponsored resolution calling for the return of IDPs to Abkhazia.
- May 26: The United Nations Observer Mission in Georgia publishes its final investigative report on April 20 drone shootdown, confirming Georgia's accusations that a Russian military jet downed the aircraft. Georgia demands an official apology and compensation from the Russian Federation.
- May 30: Georgia announces the suspension of its done flights over Abkhazia during a UN Security Council meeting.
- May 31: In an interview with Le Monde, Vladimir Putin hints that Georgia's use of reconnaissance flights over Abkhazia is meant to prepare for an invasion of the separatist region.
- June 1: In a note of protest sent by the Georgian delegation at the OSCE to its Russian counterpart, Tbilisi recognizes having lost a total of three drones during the crisis, including with the use of Buk anti-missile systems.

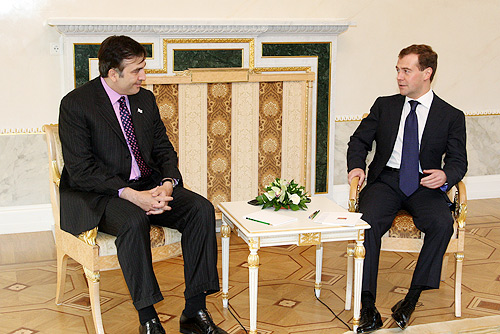
Meeting of Mikheil Saakashvili and Dmitry Medvedev.

- July 1: Using the Georgian UAV flights over Abkhazia as a reason, Russia proposes the installation of radar stations in South Ossetia.

=== March 18 Primorskoe shootdown ===
On March 18, 2008, Stanislav Lakoba, Secretary of the Security Council of the Republic of Abkhazia, announced to local press that a reconnaissance aircraft had been shot down at 12:05 over the village of Primorskoe, near the administrative boundary between the Ochamchire and Gali districts. Abkhaz officials claimed having shot down the UAV with an Aero L-39 Albatros, while a later analysis of radar records by the UN Observer Mission in Georgia confirmed a drone was shot down at an altitude of 4,500 m. The drone, identified by separatist military officials as an Elbit Hermes 450 (Serial Number 551), allegedly fell into the Black Sea, while debris was said to have been recuperated by the evening. Said debris was exhibited to local journalists in Sokhumi.

The Georgian Ministry of Defense immediately denied the incident, while admitting nonetheless the conduct of reconnaissance flights over Abkhazia to track Russian military movements in the region. A latter UNOMIG investigation confirmed nonetheless the downing of a drone, with eyewitnesses in the Gali village of Nabakevi talking about hearing an explosion, while it estimated that the aircraft's maximum range was "consistent with Georgian ownership". Abkhaz de facto Deputy Defense Minister Gari Kupalba alleged that the downed drone had been performing reconnaissance flights over Abkhazia since the summer of 2007. UNOMIG called the flying of Georgian reconnaissance flights over Abkhazia a violation of the 1994 Moscow Ceasefire Agreement, leading Abkhaz President Sergei Baghapsh to warn the central Georgian government about the "inadmissibility of reconnaissance activities."

On March 20, the People's Assembly of Abkhazia issued a declaration warning about Tbilisi's course "towards preparation for another military invasion of the Republic of Abkhazia," calling the UAV flights a "provocative action", and calling on Russia, the United Nations Secretary General, and the Group of Friends of Georgia (made of Germany, France, the United Kingdom, Russia, and the United States) to "take appropriate measures to prevent a new war in the Caucasus." On April 14, the Department of Peacekeeping Operations of the Ministry of Defense of Russia issued a note of concern to the Security Council of Russia about Georgian alleged violations of the 1994 Moscow Agreement with the drone flights. On April 15, Russia's UN Ambassador Vitaly Churkin talked about the "new phenomenon of overflight jets in the security zone" and criticized the "build-up of the Georgian military" as evidenced by a "recently shot-down drone in the airspace of the security zone."

=== April 20 Gagida shootdown ===
Location of Gagida in Abkhazia.

At 09:57 on April 20, an Elbit Hermes 450 UAV (Serial Number 553) belonging to the Ministry of Internal Affairs of Georgia was shot down over the village of Gagida in the Gali district of Abkhazia, while at an altitude of 6,000 m. Eyewitnesses described two loud explosions, an object departing from an aircraft, ignition in the air, and debris parachuting into the Black Sea, around 250 m from the Abkhaz shoreline, before the same aircraft gained height and flew north. Locals in the Abkhaz village of Dikhagudzba described having noticed a southbound aircraft traveling over the Black Sea at some point between 09:30 and 10:00. CIS peacekeepers reported having identified the drone at an altitude of 3,000 m over the towns of Anaklia and Pichori, before witnessing its explosion about 1 km northwest of Pichori.

The first to report on the drone shootdown was Georgian news network Mze TV, which reported that the events had been confirmed by State Reintegration Minister Temur Iakobashvili. Other Georgian news agencies reported eyewitness accounts from the Abkhaz village of Primorskoe (where the first drone was allegedly shot down) of a military jet and an airborne explosion. The Georgian Ministry of Defense immediately denied having lost a UAV over Abkhazia, while Iakobashvili retracted his earlier comments and claimed it was impossible to confirm the eyewitness accounts since Tbilisi could not dispatch a recovery team on site in Abkhazia. Hours after the shootdown, Georgian operational command sent a notification to the UN Observer Mission about the drone flight, post-dated April 19. On April 21, Abkhaz Deputy Defense Minister Gari Kupalba announced the recovery of drone debris and claimed that an Abkhaz-owned L-39 jet had brought shot the UAV down with an air-to-air missile as it was conducting a reconnaissance flight over the Gali and Ochamchire districts.

Later that same day, Colonel Davit Nairashvili, commander of the Georgian Air Force, retracted Tbilisi's earlier denial and confirmed during an interview with Reuters that a Georgian UAV had indeed been shot down in Abkhazia after observing troop buildups in Gali. Georgian officials adamantly denied the claim that an Abkhaz L-39 had the capacity to shoot down a drone and Nairashvili affirmed to foreign press that the spy plane had been downed by a Russian Mikoyan MiG-29 that had taken off from a supposedly abandoned military base in Gudauta. The Georgian Ministry of Defense published the entire footage recorded by the drone, a total of 2h27, including the moment when a military jet fires a missile in the direction of its camera. Tbilisi summoned Russian Ambassador Vyacheslav Kovalenko to hand over a note of protest and shared the drone footage with every foreign embassy based in Tbilisi. Russia categorically denied any involvement in the shootdown, claiming that all of its military pilots were "resting" on April 20, a Sunday. President Saakashvili called the incident an "unprovoked aggression against the sovereign territory of Georgia" and asked Vladimir Putin during an April 21 phone call to "immediately repeal the establishment of official ties with the breakaway regions and to stop attacks on Georgia." At that moment, Saakashvili stated Tbilisi's response would be "only to offer more peace initiatives" for conflict resolution.

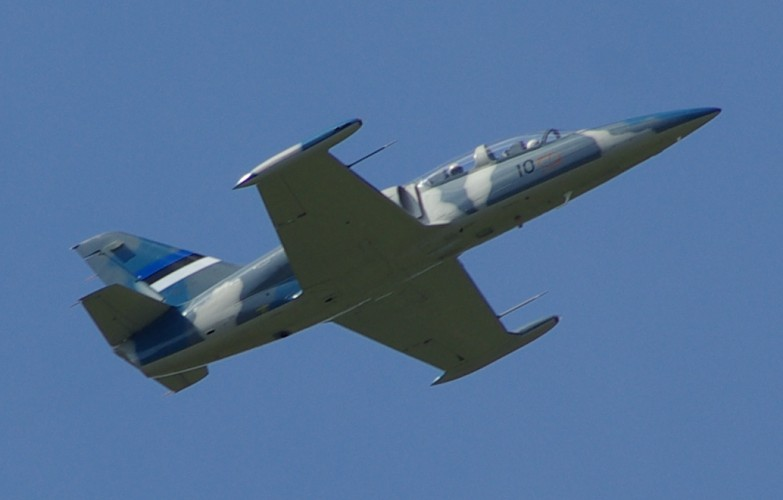
L-39 aircraft.

Moscow consistently supported Abkhazia's version of events, namely that the drone had been shot down by an L-39 that Abkhazia acquired from Ichkeria in the early 1990s. In his conversation with Saakashvili, Putin expressed "bewilderment" at the idea of Georgian UAVs flying over Abkhazia in violation of the 1994 ceasefire agreement. In response to the drone footage released by Georgia, later authenticated by the UNOMIG investigation, the Russian Ministry of Foreign Affairs stated that it "does not warrant trust and raises many question marks," noting alleged discrepancies with Tbilisi's version and the alleged pilot's maneuvers, the missile pylons' location on the plane, and several details later discredited by the UN. Georgian military experts believe that it took the military plane two shots to hit its target, for the Elbit Hermes 450 has an engine small enough to make it a difficult target for heat-seeking missiles, hence the eyewitness accounts of "two explosion sounds". Moreover, experts also believe that the technological capacities of the L-39 would have made its successful interception of a small drone in the skies "not a plausible story".

The Georgian Ministry of Defense invited groups of experts from the Baltic states and the United States to conduct investigations into the April 20 incident. On May 12, Saakashvili called for an EU investigation in addition to the UNOMIG ongoing one, which the EU did not do. Eventually, the UNSC-endorsed investigation confirmed Tbilisi's claim of a Russian plane having shot down its drone using a Vympel R-73 missile from a distance of 44.26 km, although it could not confirm if the plane was an MiG-29 or a Sukhoi Su-27.

On April 22, then-US Ambassador to Russia William J. Burns sought to raise the issue of the drone's shootdown with the Russian Ministry of Foreign Affairs, which refused to open talks with Washington on the issue, insisting it only sought direct contacts on the matter with Georgia. According to diplomatic cables released by WikiLeaks, Aleksey Pavlovskiy, the CIS Fourth Department Deputy Director at the Russian MFA, told American diplomats that he questioned the reasoning behind the drone's shootdown, given that Russia "did not need" this kind of altercations with Georgia at the moment. On April 23, the U.S. Department of State issued an official statement expressing "deep concern" over the "shooting down of an unarmed Georgian UAV, by a presumably Russian MiG-29," adding criticism for "the presence of a MiG-29 aircraft in Georgian airspace without Georgian authorization, and the use of weapons from this aircraft." The same day, at Georgia's request, the United Nations Security Council held an emergency session to discuss the drone incident, during which Russia's UN Ambassador Vitaly Churkin rejected the authenticity of the drone footage, while Georgian Foreign Minister Davit Bakradze affirmed that the incident substantially damaged Russia's role as a neutral mediator in the peace process. On April 30, a Forum for Security Cooperation was organized by the OSCE in Vienna to encourage discussions between Tbilisi and Moscow, mediated by the Finnish Presidency of the OSCE. On May 6, White House spokeswoman Dana Perino directly accused Russia of shooting down the drone, become the first international figure to do so.

==== United Nations investigation ====
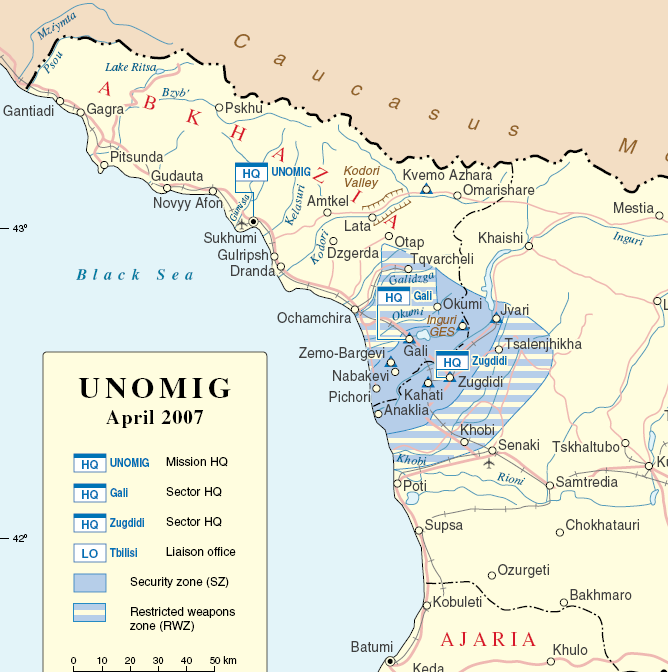
Area of operation of UNOMIG.

The United Nations Observer Mission in Georgia launched an investigation into the April 20 shootdown, establishing a fact-finding team of international investigations, including military radar controllers, UAV technology experts, pilots (including one L-39 pilot), and others. Though UNOMIG originally sought a joint investigation with the Commonwealth of Independent States' Peacekeeping Force, Georgia, and the Abkhaz separatist governments, they each refused to take direct part in the investigation, although the Mission recognized that Georgia was the sole party to fully cooperate along the way. Georgian authorities discussed inviting independent investigative groups from the United States and the Baltic states, although they never published their final findings. Abkhaz authorities refused to cooperate with the Mission for most of the investigation, but gave it access to the debris collected from the alleged shootdowns of March 18, April 20, and May 12. The lack of cooperation with the investigation from Russia was meant with criticism and publicly-deriding comments from Tbilisi.

After analyzing alleged crash sites, debris, studying eyewitness accounts, and Georgian radar records from the Poti radar stations, UNOMIG published its final report on May 26, confirming as authentic the drone footage and radar records provided by Georgia. The investigation found that the military aircraft that brought down the Georgian UAV on April 20 was, indeed, Russian, though it could not confirm what kind of aircraft it was. Available data revealed the plane's design was compatible with either an MiG-29 or a Su-27, both used exclusively by Russia, while the aircraft was seen as confirmed as heading towards Maykop into Russian airspace after shooting down the drone, concluding that the plane belonged to the Russian Air Force. The investigation was unable, however, to confirm Georgia's claim that the plane had taken off from the abandoned base of Gudauta in Abkhazia, which would have constituted a clear violation of the 1994 ceasefire agreement: though the radar picked up the plane's ping near Gudauta, another explanation was that it flew at a low altitude until reaching the vicinity of Gudauta, before ascending high enough to be picked up by the Georgian radar.

The UNOMIG investigation also confirmed that Georgian drones were indeed shot down on March 18 and May 12, despite previous Georgian denials, and confirmed at least five Georgian drone flights and two Russian jet flights over Abkhazia between March 18 and May 12. As for the April 20 incident, the investigation revealed that the drone crossed the ceasefire line at 09:31, while radars first picked up the intercepting jet at 09:48, 12.6 km east of Gudauta at an altitude of 2,800 m. A short-range missile was used to shoot down the drone and the explosion took place inside an international airway at a time when a civilian aircraft were flying.

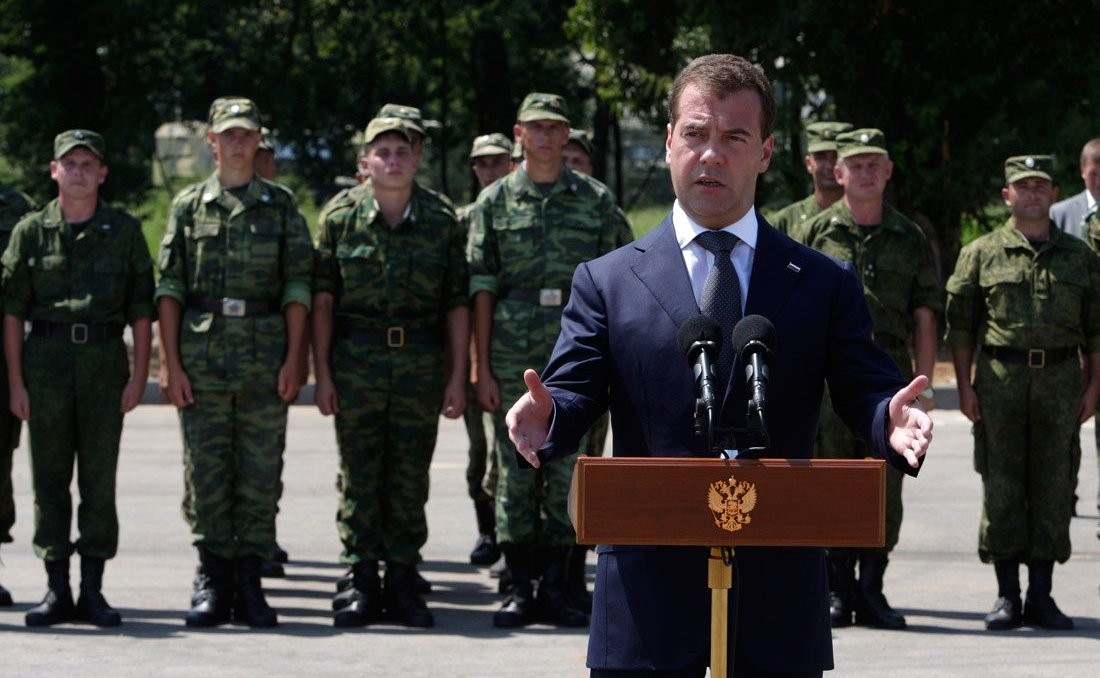
Dmitry Medvedev addressing Russian troops at the military base of Gudauta (2010).

UNOMIG accused both Georgia and Russia of violating the 1994 ceasefire agreement, Georgia for using a reconnaissance military aircraft banned by the Moscow Agreement, and Russia for using a plane independent from its peacekeeping forces to shoot down the drone on April 20.

The results of the investigation were welcomed by the Georgian government, with Saakashvili praising this "first case when an international organization and especially UN, without general phrases, has directly pointed its finger at Russia" and called for an international inspection of the Gudauta military base. On May 27, the Georgian Ministry of Foreign Affairs summoned Russian Ambassador Kovalenko to demand an official apology and "appropriate compensation for the material loss". On the other hand, Russia focused on what it called the "root causes" of the incident, namely the use by Georgia of UAVs to illegally engage in reconnaissance missions over Abkhazia, something that Tbilisi justified by pointing fingers at the increased Russian military presence in the region. Discussing the claimed legitimacy of Georgian drone flights, UNOMIG stated,

However legitimate this purpose may seem to the Georgian side, it stands to reason that this kind of military intelligence-gathering is bound to be interpreted by the Abkhaz side as a precursor to a military operation, particularly in a period of tense relations between the sides.

Russian diplomatic efforts focused on finding issues with details of the investigation and the evidence provided, which the Russian MFA called "questionable" just a day after the report's publication. Though it refused to publicize its own radar records, it claimed that the Georgian air radar data "did not coincide with those available for us", asking Georgia to hand over the records to Russia for a separate analysis. Ambassador Churkin further questioned the lack of communication between the pilot of the aircraft and ground control, which, according to him, made it "virtually impossible to shoot down a drone". Aleksandr Drobishevsky, spokesman for the Russian Air Force, denied his force's involvement in the incident. Abkhaz authorities accused the United Nations of bias, with de facto Foreign Minister Sergei Shamba announcing Sokhumi was considering withdrawing from the Geneva Process altogether over the report. When asked about the report's ruling against the plausibility of an L-39's involvement in the shootdown, Shamba said, "all this stuff about double fins is irrelevant."

On May 29, Georgia requested, based on Article 35 of the UN Charter, an emergency session of the UN Security Council to debate the findings of the investigation. Moscow called for the participation of Abkhazia in the session, something that Tbilisi strongly opposed. Georgia's UN Ambassador Irakli Alasania then warned that "it is not in the best interests of Russia to set this kind of precedent, because then the questions arise why can’t other representatives of the separatist movements be allowed at the UN forums." Russia agreed to a Security Council meeting without the participation of Abkhazia, which took place on May 30. During the session, Georgia was backed by the United States, represented by Deputy Representative Alejandro Wolff, who refused to recognize the drone flights over Abkhazia as a violation of the 1994 Moscow Agreement, calling the issue "unclear at best" and based on "an interpretation as to whether a UAV reconnaissance craft that cannot be armed constitutes military action." Georgia acknowledged its violation of the ceasefire and Ambassador Alasania announced during the UNSC meeting an end to Georgia's drone reconnaissance program, though reserving "the right to fly drones" in the future. Russia's Vitaly Churkin spent the session debating the veracity of the report, alleging that the drone footage released by Georgia had been fabricated. On May 31, the Russian Ministry of Foreign Affairs criticized the entire process, including the investigation and the UN Security Council meeting.

=== May 4 alleged Gali shootdowns ===
Location of Dikhazurga in Abkhazia.

Abkhaz separatist authorities claimed having shot down another two Georgian UAVs on May 4. According to the Ministry of Defense of Abkhazia, one drone was shot at 16:06 over the village of Dikhazurga and a second one at 16:51 over the village of Bargebi, both in the Gali district (although Russian press claimed the drones had flown over Ochamchire) and both allegedly brought down by air defense units on the ground. Merab Kishmaria, the separatist republic's Minister of Defense, originally confirmed only one drone shootdown, before adding another one in his official statements. Sokhumi announced having dispatched a search group to locate and recuperate drone debris, located in a radius of 8–12 km from the shootdown point. By the end of day, Abkhaz authorities exhibited alleged debris of the drone to journalists.

Georgian television channel Rustavi 2 originally reported shots fired in the area where the drones were said to have been shot down, with reports of Russian peacekeepers having been taken prisoner. Officials in Tbilisi immediately denied having lost two drones on May 4, calling the claim "another Russian provocation aimed at propaganda support of Russia's military intervention," while confirming that UAVs "have flown, are flying, and will continue to fly over the Georgian sovereign airspace to gather full information about the Russian military intervention." The Ministry of Internal Affairs published a conflicting statement, with Analytical Department head Shota Utiashvili denying any Georgian UAV flying over Abkhazia. The Ministry of Defense of Georgia called the claim an "attempt to distract" from the then-ongoing UN investigation into the April 20 shootdown.

Despite Tbilisi's denials, Abkhaz officials issued several statements of condemnations against Tbilisi and de facto President Baghapsh ordered the Abkhaz military to stand on high alert over increased tensions and issued a direct order to "shoot down any aerial targets violating Abkhaz airspace." Abkhaz Foreign Minister Sergei Shamba called the drone flights "a demonstration of Georgia's aggressive intentions".

Moscow publicly sided with Sokhumi, rejecting Georgia's denial and condemning the alleged drone flights as "unauthorized", while describing Abkhazia's alleged shootdown as "natural", a statement that made Tbilisi question Russia's status as peacekeeper. The Russian Ministry of Foreign Affairs warned that "the authorities in Tbilisi have taken the path of deliberately escalating tensions in the region" by continuing to violate the 1994 ceasefire agreement and "ignoring Russia's warnings."

Location of Bargebi in Abkhazia.

On May 6, Abkhazia's Shamba stated during an interview that the Abkhaz armed forces had used a Buk missile system to shoot down the two UAVs, marking the first admission by Sokhumi that its military possessed such an advanced anti-aircraft system. Separatist authorities claimed that the Buk system had been left behind by Russian forces during the 1992–1993 Abkhazia War, but Georgia believed the system had been positioned in the region as late as 2007, in violation of the 1994 ceasefire agreement, and called on the United Nations to "urgently launch a probe into the presence and use of anti-aircraft defense systems in Abkhazia". Russia's 643rd Anti-Aircraft Regiment stationed in Gudauta in 1992 reportedly possessed three Buk missile systems and had left them behind after the end of the war, a claim that could not be verified over Russia's refusal to allow international monitors into the abandoned Gudauta base.

=== May 8 alleged Ochamchire shootdown ===
On May 8, the Ministry of Defense of Abkhazia claimed having shot down another Georgian UAV over the Ochamchire district at 17:05 (or 17:10 according to some reports), using local anti-aircraft missile systems. According to Sokhumi, the drone was shot down at an altitude of 1,500 m and allegedly carried an air-to-air missiles, "representing danger for both civilians and peacekeeping troops." The incident was condemned by Abkhaz separatist officials as a "gross violation of Abkhaz airspace".

Tbilisi once again denied the shootdown, with Shota Utiashvili called the claim a "lie" in an interview with Reuters. During a meeting with Russian journalists in Batumi, President Saakashvili also denied the reports. Though the Interior Ministry originally denied having flown a drone over Abkhazia that day, it would reveal days later footage said to have been recorded by a Georgian UAV on May 8 revealing Russian troop and military equipment movement in Abkhazia, independent from the publicly-announced Russian peacekeeping reinforcement.

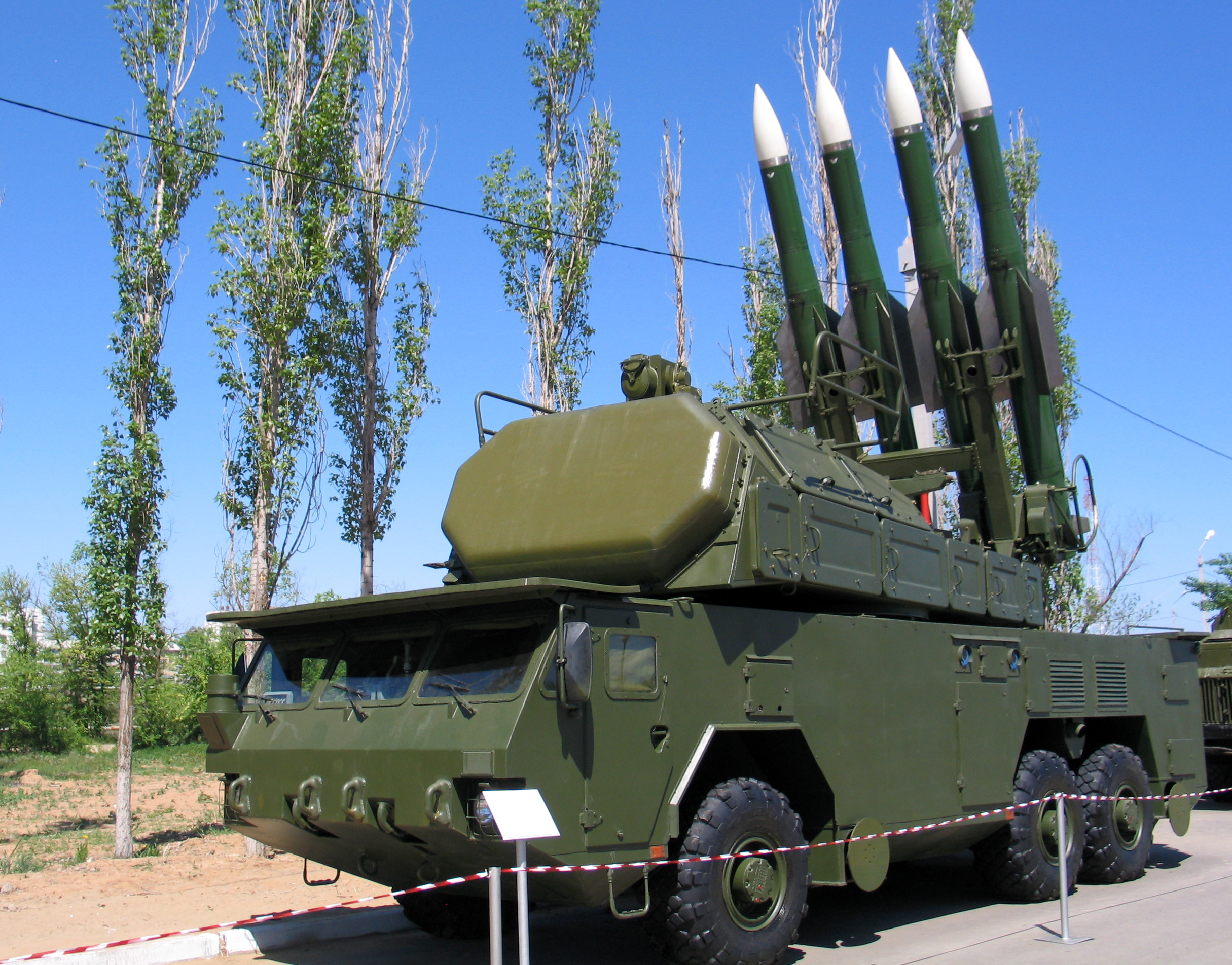
Buk missile system, allegedly used to bring down Georgian drones.

According to emails leaked by WikiLeaks, Stratfor analyst Karen Hooper claimed having an "Abkhaz source" that told her local authorities kept using the same downed drone's debris in various incidents, including on May 8, simply moving the wreckage for videos.

=== May 12 alleged Ochamchire shootdowns ===
On May 12, Abkhaz Deputy Defense Minister Gari Kupalba claimed his forces had brought down an additional two Georgian UAVs, one at 14:16 over the village of Shesheleti and another one at 15:07 over the village of Achigvara, both in the Ochamchire district, and both shot down at an altitude of at least 5,000 m. Sokhumi claimed having retrieved debris from at least one of the drones, confirming it to be an Elbit Hermes 450, owned by the Ministry of Defense of Georgia.

The Georgian government originally denied the reports. On May 14, Tbilisi acknowledged having lost one drone two days prior, although it never stated which of the two incidents claimed by Abkhazia was confirmed. These shootdowns are the last to take place in Abkhazia before Georgia announces an end to its drone surveillance program on May 30.

== Reactions ==
=== Domestic reactions in Georgia ===
The Georgian government acknowledged the existence of its drone program and rejected accusations by Russia, backed by the United Nations, that it was in violation of the 1994 Moscow Agreement between Georgia, Abkhazia, and Russia, arguing that the reconnaissance missions contributed "incontrovertible evidence" that Russia had been strengthening its armed positions in the contested region. The April 20 incident severely damaged bilateral relations between Tbilisi and Moscow, with President Saakashvili calling it an "unfriendly move" and building a campaign to internationalize the Abkhazia peacekeeping force. Many experts, including former Deputy Military Intelligence Director Zviad Chkhaidze, believed that the drone shootdowns could be leveraged by Tbilisi to pressure NATO to grant it a Membership Action Plan (MAP) at its Bucharest Summit. On May 5, Georgia formally withdrew from its Air Defense Cooperation Treaty with Russia, signed in 1995.

In the spring of 2008, Georgia was in the midst of a political crisis after controversial presidential and parliamentary elections. Opposition leaders criticized Saakashvili's drone program as an "adventurous move". MP Kakha Kukava of the Conservative Party compared Saakashvili to his predecessor Eduard Shevardnadze, "whose adventurous moves sacrificed Abkhazia just for retaining his own power."

The drone shootdowns effectively marked the end of ongoing attempts for a peaceful settlement of the Abkhazia conflict. On March 20, the People's Assembly of Abkhazia passed a resolution condemning "violations of Abkhazia's airspace through reconnaissance flights, indicating preparations for another war." On April 30, the same People's Assembly called on Abkhaz leader Sergei Baghapsh to withdraw from the Geneva Process, a conflict settlement negotiation format mediated by France, Germany, the United Kingdom, Russia, and the United States. In each incident, Abkhaz authorities boasted about their military capabilities, notably their anti-aircraft systems, and denied any Russian involvement in the downing of the drones.

=== Russian reactions ===
Russia's government was heavily critical of Georgia's drone program, arguing the presence of reconnaissance flights over Abkhazia caused a threat to regional stability and violated the 1994 Moscow Ceasefire Agreement. Russian rhetoric became increasingly more aggressive after the April 20 incident, when the international community accused Russia of shooting down the Georgian UAV with a military jet. Moscow routinely accused Tbilisi of planning a military operation against Abkhazia and justified the increase of its peacekeeping force in the region using that argument. Russia's CIS Special Envoy Valery Kenyakin warned that Moscow would "have to react through military means" if drone flights continued.

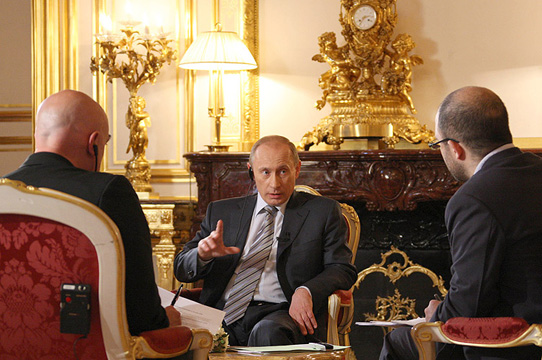
Putin speaking to Le Monde in May 2008.

Moscow also positioned itself in opposition to Western countries over their support of Tbilisi during the drone crisis. Boris Malakhov, spokesman for the Russian Ministry of Foreign Affairs, criticized on May 12 Matthew Bryza, Director for Europe and Eurasia at the U.S. National Security Council, for having defended the use of spy planes by Georgia over Abkhazia, "in line with the US administration’s efforts to cover up and shield from criticism those, whom they are actively dragging into NATO." After the release of the UNOMIG investigative report on May 26, Russia criticized the investigation altogether.

On May 31, Vladimir Putin, then-Prime Minister of Russia, talked about the drone crisis in an interview with Le Monde:

Much is spoken now about downing of several Georgian unmanned aerial vehicles over Abkhazia. But why is not anyone saying anything about the fact, that existing agreements prohibit flights over this conflict territory? What are these flights? It's reconnaissance. And why do you conduct reconnaissance? To support military actions. Does that mean one of the sides is preparing to spill blood? Do we want that? No one wants that.

Some experts have argued that Russia started its large-scale drone manufacturing program after seeing Georgia's advantage in the region.

=== International reactions ===
Except for one report by the UN Secretary General that called the drone flights "one of the sources" of the renewed Georgian-Abkhaz tensions, most statements from the international community were made in support of Georgia's territorial integrity and in condemnation of Russia's military activity in the region. According to the Georgian Ministry of Defense, the United States dispatched a group of experts following the April 20 incident to investigate the shootdowns. Washington was the first country to officially recognize Russia's role in the April 20 incident on May 6, when White House spokeswoman Dana Perino called it a "provocative Russian step". A day later, the United States House of Representatives adopted a nonbinding resolution criticizing "provocative and dangerous statements and actions taken by Russia", calling for a UN investigation into the April 20 incident, and urging NATO to grant Georgia the MAP. At a Congressional hearing, Assistant State Secretary Daniel Fried cited the "downing of the Georgian reconnaissance drone by a Russian fighter jet" as one of the main contributors to the Georgia-Russia crisis.

Other NATO states also supported Georgia, including Canada, whose Foreign Minister Maxime Bernier, who criticized the April 20 incident as having "made a difficult situation worse."

On May 12, foreign ministers from five European Union member states arrived in Tbilisi to express support for Georgia and urged the European Commission to formally investigate the April 20 incident as a violation of the Georgian airspace. In response to the UNOMIG investigation, the External Relations Council of the EU issued a statement pledging to deepen ties with Georgia. On June 5, 2008, the European Parliament adopted a resolution blaming Russia for downing Georgian UAVs over Abkhazia, while calling on Georgia to stop its drone program. On April 30, Terry Davis, Secretary General of the Council of Europe, called on Georgia and Russia to "do everything in their power to prevent any further deterioration of the situation with negative consequences for the local population and stability in the region."

The OSCE, then chaired by Finnish Foreign Minister Alexander Stubb, warned that the drone shootdowns and Russia's establishment of ties with Abkhazia "considerably increased tensions in the region", declaring the Abkhazia crisis a "priority issue" and calling for a Forum for Security Cooperation after Georgia invoked the Vienna Mechanism, triggering consultations within the OSCE Permanent Council, despite Russian opposition.

== Outcome and prelude to the war ==
The drone crisis contributed to a serious deterioration of relations between Georgia and Russia, which led the IIFFMCG to describe the UAV shootdowns as "the first part of the prelude to the war", referring to the August Russo-Georgian war. Addressing the Duma on May 20, Foreign Minister Lavrov condemned "practical actions and provocations by the Georgian leadership, including continuing flights over the conflict zone in Abkhazia." Georgia accused Russia of conducting an "aggressive military act" by shooting down its aircraft and demanded not only compensation but international inspections of Russian military facilities in the conflict zone, as well as the supposedly-abandoned Gudauta military field. Georgia's UN Ambassador Irakli Alasania declared that it was Georgia's "sovereign right" to "observe and monitor its territory and illegal movement of Abkhaz and Russian forces," in response to which Lavrov called the drone flights as the "root of the problem" that led to the militarization of Abkhazia.

On the ground, the UN Observer Mission argued that the drone flights were "bound to be interpreted by the Abkhaz side as a precursor to a military operation." In his book "A Little War That Shook the World", Ronald Asmus asserted that Russia committed the first military aggression that led to the war by shooting down a Georgian UAV over internationally-recognized Georgian territory, though the incident reinforced the notion on each side that the other was preparing to attack. On July 1, Russia used the drone crisis in Abkhazia to justify a demand to install a Russian-led radar station in South Ossetia, while skirmishes intensified in both Abkhazia and South Ossetia before the beginning of the war. Several phone calls and meetings between Saakashvili and his Russian counterpart Dmitry Medvedev failed to defuse tensions.

Nino Burjanadze, who served as Chair of the Georgian Parliament during the drone crisis, questioned the Georgian government's failure to prepare for a large-scale military conflict following the drone crisis. She also criticized the failure of the National Security Council to foresee the threat of Russia's downing of Georgian UAVs. Nonetheless, Tbilisi sought to receive international support through different mechanisms and on May 15, it successfully lobbied for a UNGA resolution calling for the immediate return of Georgian IDPs to Abkhazia. Around the same time, media reports alleged a potential deal reached between Tbilisi and Moscow on the internationalization of the peacekeeping force, with Georgia agreeing to sign a non-use of force agreement with Sokhumi and the latter agreeing to a partial return of IDPs. The deal never materialized.

On May 30, Ambassador Alasania announced during a UN Security Council meeting the end of Georgia's drone flights over Abkhazia, though maintaining it would resume them if a threat occurred. No further UAV flights was reported over the region.

In early August 2008, Israeli media revealed that Israel had halted the sale of military equipment, including its Elbit drones, to Georgia after Russia had issued a note of protest following the April 20 incident. Though Tbilisi denied the reports as "political gossip", President Saakashvili eventually admitted Israel's arms embargo that happened days before Russia's invasion of Georgia.

Some experts went on to describe the 2008 Russo-Georgian war as the "first drone war". The April 20 incident is the first recorded case of a drone shootdown using air-to-air missiles, while the crisis is seen as one of the earlier examples of "drone warfare". The Russian policy of mass manufacturing reconnaissance drones followed the Abkhazia crisis.

== Works cited ==
- Report by the Independent International Fact-Finding Mission on the Conflict in Georgia (PDF) (Report). Vol. II. September 21, 2009.
- Report by the Independent International Fact-Finding Mission on the Conflict in Georgia (PDF) (Report). Vol. III. September 21, 2009.
- Report of UNOMIG on the Incident of 20 April Involving the Downing of a Georgian Unmanned Aerial Vehicle over the Zone of Conflict (PDF) (Report). UN Security Council. May 26, 2008.
