= Rudrastra =

Unmanned aerial vehicle

General information
- Type: Unmanned aerial vehicle
- National origin: India
- Manufacturer: Solar Aerospace and Defence Limited

The Rudrastra is a hybrid vertical take-off and landing unmanned aerial vehicle (VTOL-UAV) that is designed domestically by Indian private sector company Solar Aerospace and Defence Limited, based in Nagpur. Once the mission is complete, it is expected to return to the original launch location after penetrating deep into enemy territory. Rudrastra is capable of hitting enemy soldiers and taking down tanks and armored vehicles. It is intended for use in cross-border attacks to destroy enemy artillery sites. Features of Rudrastra include precision targeting, long-range operations, and real-time observation, surveillance, reconnaissance, and intelligence gathering. Rudrastra is developed to strengthen India's military strength and tackle security issues in the South Asian region, especially along the Pakistani border to the west.

== Description ==
Engineered and built by Solar Aerospace and Defence Limited, based in Nagpur, the Rudrastra is a hybrid vertical take-off and landing unmanned aerial vehicle (VTOL-UAV). With 8 kg of ammunition, it can fly within a 50 km radius. It is a longer range UAV, that can enter enemy territory to perform deep penetration strikes while relaying live operational video, and then return to its launch location under autonomous mode. The current iteration can destroy tanks, armored vehicles and combat troops. With an estimated endurance time of 1.5 hours, Rudrastra's maximum range, including loitering range, exceeds 170 km. Rudrastra uses an airburst anti-personnel payload that is precisely guided to target enemy forces. Because VTOL UAVs can take off and land vertically without the use of runways, they are useful and adaptable for specialized tasks like mapping, distribution, and surveillance, particularly in challenging terrain.

Rudrastra is flexible and difficult-to-spot. It can take off like a helicopter and cruise like an airplane. It can carry smart warheads. The Indian Army intends to purchase a significant quantity of these drones. It doesn't require runways because it can land vertically. The drone will be used as stand-off weapons by the Indian Army.

== Trial ==
Following the conclusion of the company's internal assessment, the Indian Army conducted multiple tests of Rudrastra in Pokhran Field Firing Range on 11 June 2025, to test for characteristics such as vertical takeoff and landing, high endurance, precise targeting, and mission flexibility. The goal is to fulfill mission criteria, which include eliminating enemy positions that offer cover fire for infiltration attempts and terrorist infrastructure. Rudrastra demonstrated dependable performance throughout the trials, functioning over a mission radius of more than 50 kilometers while sustaining a steady real-time video communication. The UAV successfully finished the mission and made a smooth return to its launch location. Rudrastra, which was built for precision targeting as well as observation, demonstrated its capacity to hover in target locations and engage accurately.

In the direction of Aatmanirbhar Bharat, this successful trial served as an example of mission-neutral design. Taxi trials for 180–220 horsepower domestic engines were finished earlier in February 2025.

== See also ==
- Shield AI MQ-35 V-BAT
- Wingtra WingtraOne
- Elbit Hermes 450
