= Shield AI =

American defense technology company

- Type: Private
- Industry: Defense
- Founded: 2015; 11 years ago
- Founders: Brandon Tseng; Ryan Tseng; Andrew Reiter
- Headquarters: San Diego, California, U.S.
- Key people: Gary Steele (CEO)
- Number of employees: 1,500 (March 2026)
- Website: shield.ai

Shield AI is an American aerospace and defense technology company based in San Diego, California, United States. It develops artificial intelligence-powered fighter pilots, drones, and technology for defense operations. Its clients include the United States Special Operations Command, US Air Force, US Marine Corps, US Navy and several international militaries. The company’s small-unmanned aircraft system (sUAS) Nova became the first AI-powered drone to be deployed for defense purposes in US military history.

== History ==
Shield AI established in 2015 is a defense and artificial intelligence technology startup founded by former-Navy Seal Officer Brandon Tseng, his brother Ryan Tseng, and Andrew Reiter in San Diego, California. According to David Ignatius, writing for The Washington Post, ex-Navy SEAL Brandon got the startup idea while fighting in Afghanistan. In one of the missions, his unit suffered casualties in the Uruzgan province due to poor reconnaissance of a hostile building. The founding team began operations with a seed fund of $100,000 gathered from friends and family and a mission to protect service members and civilians with intelligent systems. They began building a prototype of their flagship Nova drone in 2015.

In 2016, Shield AI received its first contract, one from the US Department of Defense’s Defense Innovation Unit (DIU) autonomy program. As part of this contract, Nova was first deployed for reconnaissance and combat assistance in the Middle East in 2018.

In 2021, the company received a $7.2 million contract from the US Air Force for its small-unmanned aircraft systems (sUAS). It later acquired defense contractor Heron Systems and aerospace company Martin UAV for undisclosed amounts. The same year in November, based on company press releases The Dallas Morning News reported that the company was valued at over $1 billion following a funding round. Over the years, it has received funding from venture capitalist firms such as Andreessen Horowitz, Breyer Capital, and Silicon Valley Bank.

In June 2022, following a $165 million funding round, the company was valued at $2.3 billion.

In 2022, the company received another contract from the US Air Force, through the Pentagon’s AfVentures Strategic Funding Increase (AFWERX STRATFI) Program. FedScoop reported the contract to be worth $60 million. In July 2022, it was chosen as one of several companies to aid the US Air Force for its Joint All Domain Command and Control (JADC2) program.

In 2022, the company opened an office in the United Arab Emirates under retired Navy SEAL vice-admiral Bob Harward. The United States Sixth Fleet included the subject in its "Digital Horizon" sea exercise in Bahrain in November 2022 to demonstrate unmanned and artificial intelligence capabilities.

In October 2023, the company raised $200 million at $2.7 billion valuation, co-led by U.S. Innovation Technology Fund (USIT) and Riot Ventures.

In April 2024, Shield AI's V-BAT, which at the time needed to be assisted manually during vertical landings, partially amputated three fingers of a US Navy service member, who ultimately recovered completely. CEO Ryan Tseng noted that restrictions on flight were imposed upon the V-BAT for several months, and stated that "the event was a surprise, and it was one that, frankly, I feel terrible about." Shield has since further developed V-BAT to have unassisted launch and land capabilities.

In January 2025, Shield AI has opened an office in Kyiv to provide full support for Ukraine’s fleet of V-BAT vertical takeoff and landing drones.

On March 12, 2025, Shield AI's then-current CEO Ryan Tseng was replaced by Gary Steele, a Cisco executive. Ryan was named subsequently as Chief Strategic Officer of Shield AI.

On April 9, 2025, Shield AI was added to China's Unreliable Entities list which barred the company "from sourcing parts, operating, investing or visiting the country." President Brandon Tseng said move would not affect the company as he said it was "intentionally not reliant on China."

In October 2025, Shield AI unveiled X-BAT, the world’s first AI-piloted vertical takeoff and landing (VTOL) fighter jet. It’s the only platform that combines vertical takeoff and landing with a 2,000 nautical mile range, meaning it can launch from ships, islands, or austere sites — no runways or tankers required. Initial VTOL flights are planned for 2026, followed by all-up flight testing and operational validation in 2028 It was announced that Shield AI will be constructing a flight test facility for X-BAT at the Newton City/County Airport east of Newton, Kansas.

In March 2026, Shield AI announced it is raising $1.5 billion in Series G funding at a $12.7 billion post-money valuation and $500 million in fixed-return preferred equity financing. A portion of the proceeds will support the acquisition of Aechelon Technology, Inc.

== Technology ==
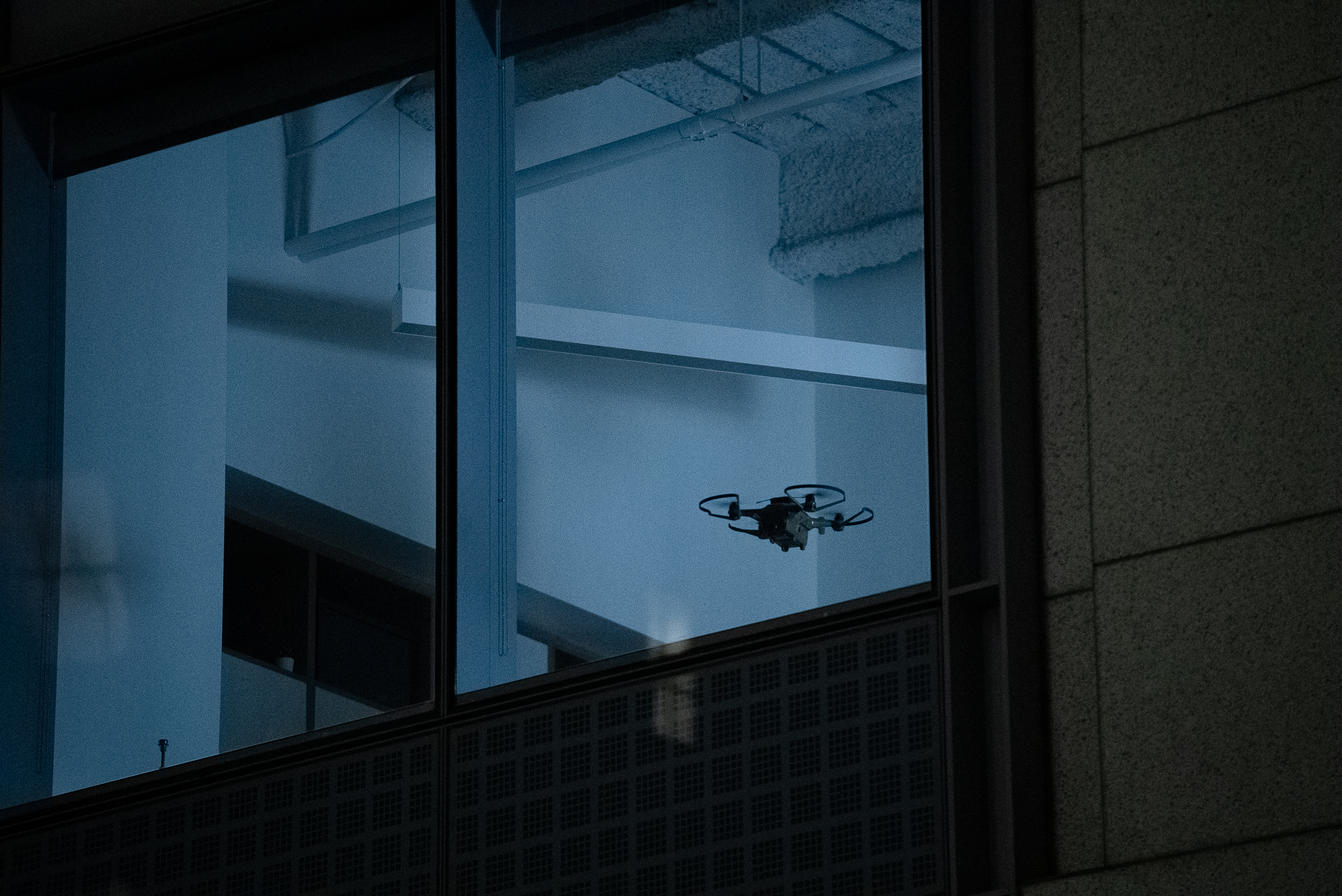
Nova 2 flying autonomously indoors

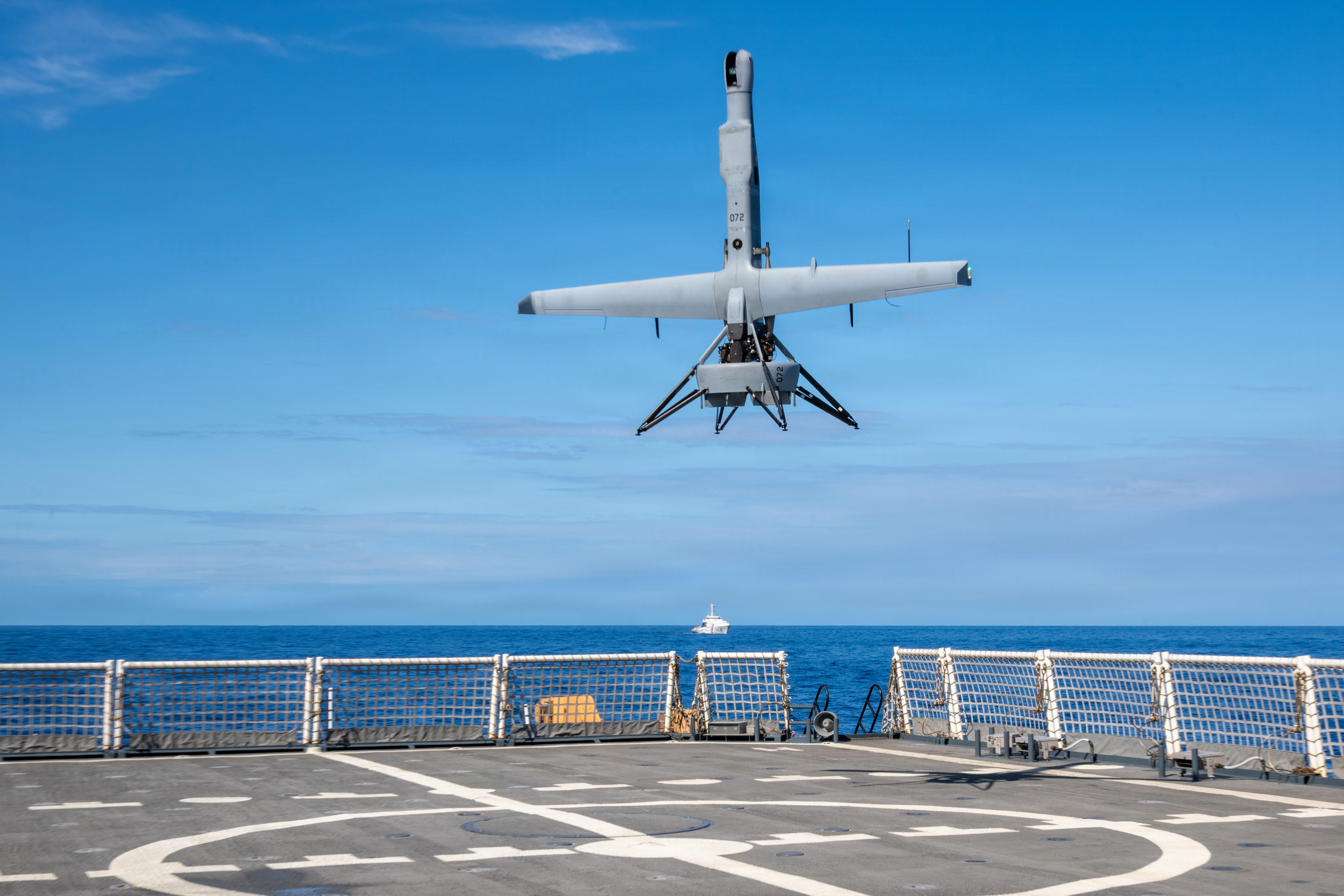
V-BAT lands on USCGC Kimball during RIMPAC 2026

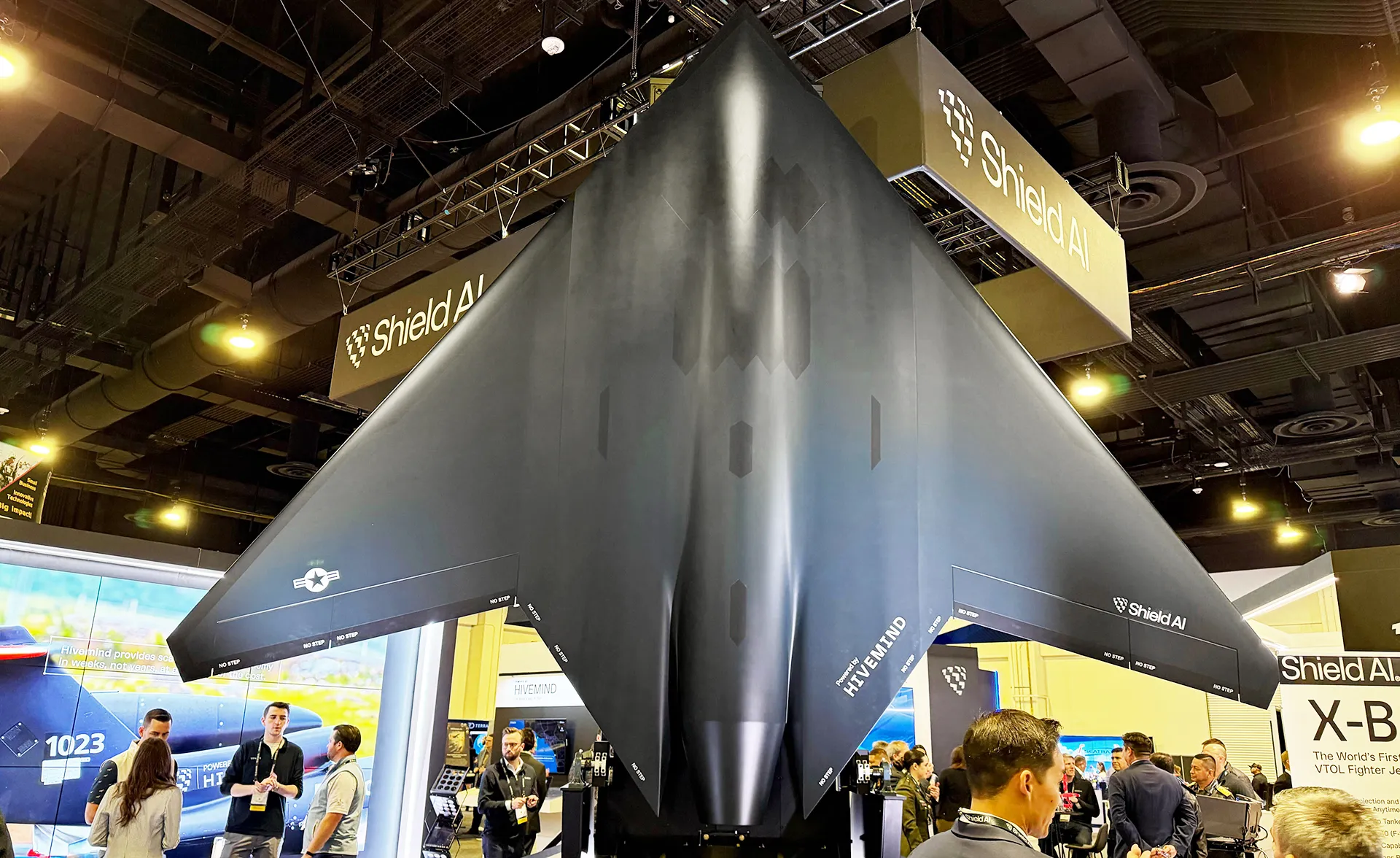
Shield AI X-BAT unmanned fighter aircraft at Sea-Air-Space 2026

Shield AI employs machine learning and artificial intelligence to develop defense software and tools. It developed Nova, an autonomous quadcopter drone, and Hivemind, its autonomy and artificial intelligence stack, in 2015. This software helps drones and aircraft maneuver autonomously in GPS- and communication-degraded environments. Its products are used for reconnaissance in close-quarters combat and solving problems such as room-clearing and the fatal funnel.

Nova is an autonomous quadcopter drone categorized as a sUAS that runs using lidar technology and can navigate in GPS-agnostic environments. When used in military combat missions, the drone can enter a hostile building and send its photos and maps to a unit of soldiers to help them better navigate it. Nova and Hivemind have since been used by the US Special Operations Command for reconnaissance and combat operations. According to WIRED’s Elliot Ackerman, this was likely the first time an AI-powered drone was being used for defense purposes in US military history. The Wall Street Journal called it “the first autonomous robot of its kind used in combat”. In 2021, the company released Nova 2.

Shield AI makes AI-powered vertical take-off and landing (VTOL) aircraft called V-BAT through its acquisition of Martin UAV. In 2022, Brazil ordered V-BATs for its defense unit. The company has a drone swarming capability called V-BAT Teams, which enables a single human operator to command a minimum of four V-BAT drones.

Shield AI introduced X-BAT, an autonomous vertical take-off and landing (VTOL) unmanned aircraft, in 2025. The platform uses Hivemind AI to conduct combat and support missions without reliance on runways and is designed for deployment in contested and austere operating environments. Maximum altitude is 50,000 ft. Range is 2,000 NM.

== Recognition ==
In 2020, Fast Company ranked Shield AI 5th on its list of the World’s Most Innovative Companies under the Robotics category. The same year, co-founders Brandon and Ryan Tseng were featured on WIRED25, the magazine’s annual list of “people who made things better”.

In 2021, Forbes added it to its list of America’s Most Promising Artificial Intelligence Companies. The company was ranked 287th in the Inc. 5000 2021. The Wall Street Journal featured the company’s Nova drone in its “100 Years of Robots” list.

In 2022, Forbes ranked Shield AI 97th in its list of America’s Best Startup Employers.

In 2023, Forbes included Shield AI on its AI 50 list, and Inc. included the company on its Best Workplaces list.

In 2025, CNBC ranked Shield AI 38th on its annual Disruptor 50 list.

== See also ==
- Shield AI MQ-35 V-BAT
