= Elbit Hermes 450 =

Israeli military drone, 1998

Hermes 450
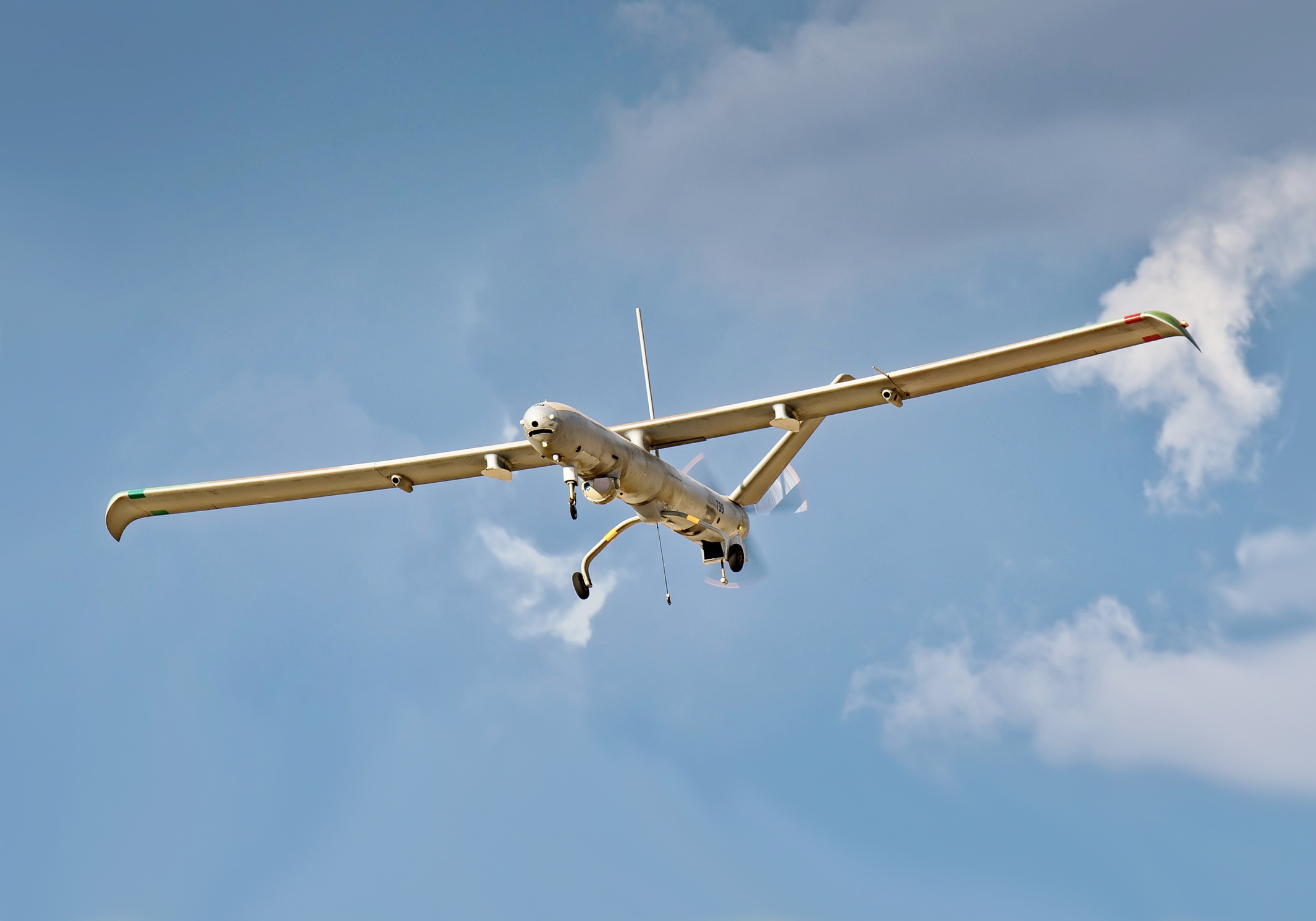
- A Hermes 450 from 166 Squadron in flight

General information
- Type: Unmanned surveillance and reconnaissance aerial vehicle
- National origin: Israel
- Manufacturer: Elbit Systems; Adani-Elbit Advanced Systems
- Status: Active
- Primary users: Israeli Air Force Philippine Air Force; Royal Thai Army

History
- Introduction date: 1998
- Variant: Thales Watchkeeper WK450
- Developed into: Elbit Hermes 900

The Hermes 450, Zik is a medium-sized multi-payload unmanned aerial vehicle (UAV) designed by Israeli defence company Elbit for tactical long-endurance missions. It has an endurance of over 20 hours, with a primary mission of reconnaissance, surveillance and communications relay. Payload options include electro-optical/infrared sensors, communications and electronic intelligence, synthetic-aperture radar/ground-moving target indication, electronic warfare, and hyperspectral sensors.

== Overview ==
The Hermes 450 is a medium-sized UAV with a cylindrical shaped fuselage, high straight wings and a V-tail. It is autonomous from take off to landing, with an auto pilot capable of take off and landing. It can be controlled completely from a ground station.

In 2008, Elbit announced that a new R902(W) Wankel engine, weighing about 40 kilograms (88 lb) and developing 70 brake horsepower (52 kW) using electronic fuel control, would be used in the Hermes 450.

It has the option of carrying four Rafael Spike missiles.

It is the basis of the Thales Watchkeeper WK450 and Hermes 900 designs.

== Operational history ==
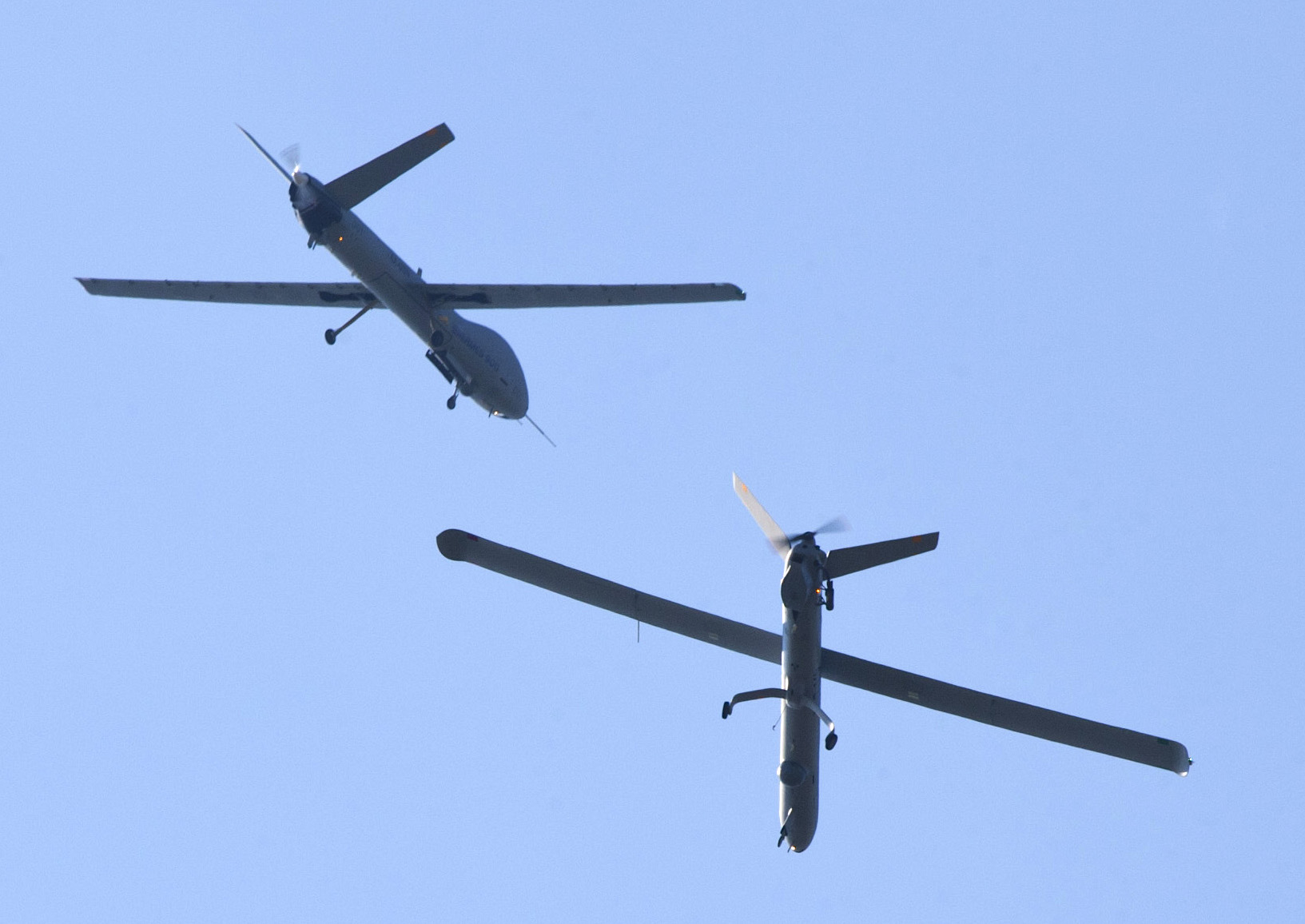
Elbit Hermes 900 & Elbit Hermes 450 UAVs in formation

=== Azerbaijan ===
On 12 September 2011, a UAV was reportedly shot down by the Artsakh Defense Army (ARDA) over the airspace of the unrecognized Republic of Artsakh. Preliminary investigations carried out by the ARDA have determined the model to be a Hermes 450 type.

=== Brazil ===
A Conexão Reporter story on the 2018 military intervention in Rio de Janeiro shows that at least one Hermes 450 drone was used by the Brazilian military to provide ISR during security operations.

=== Georgia ===
In April 2008, amid Georgian and Russian spy plane shootdowns, three Elbit Hermes 450 were shot down by Russian forces, one by a MiG-29 and other two by ground fire. The Russian Ministry of Foreign Affairs stated and showed the debris of two Herbil drones shot down on March 18 and April 20 with serial numbers 551 and 553 respectively. A UNOMIG mission report said that the panel found the debris of at least three Georgian Hermes 450 drones shot down on 18 March, 20 April and 12 May 2008. Abkhazian forces claimed 7 drones shot down. According to Georgia's president and emails from Stratfor, the drones data link codes were given to Russia by Israel in exchange for the codes for Tor-M1 missile defense systems that Russia sold Iran.

=== Israel ===
Israeli Hermes 450 UAVs has seen service in the Gaza Strip operations, the Second Lebanon War as well as in the 2009 Sudan air raids.

Three Hermes 450 drones were lost during the 2006 Lebanon War, two by technical difficulties and one by an operator error.

On 11 July 2015, an Israeli Hermes 450 drone was reported crashed near Tripoli port, Lebanon.

On 31 March 2018, an Israeli Hermes 450 drone crashed due to a technical failure. An additional Israeli drone bombed the crashed drone and destroyed it.

On 5 November 2023, during the Lebanon Israeli clashes related to the Gaza war, Hezbollah claimed to have shot down an Israeli Hermes 450 drone that was flying over Nabatieh south Lebanon.

On 26 February 2024, Hezbollah shot down a Hermes 450 drone with a surface to air missile.

On 1 April 2024, a Hermes 450 drone carried out missile strikes which targeted a World Central Kitchen aid convoy in Gaza. Three cars were hit in separate strikes around 2.5 km apart, killing seven WCK aid workers. The convoy had coordinated its movements with Israeli forces and the vehicles were clearly marked.

Hermes 450 drones were used by the Israeli Air Force over Tehran since the third day of the Twelve-Day War on 2025.

=== United Kingdom ===
The Hermes 450 was operated by the 32nd Regiment Royal Artillery of the British Army on military operations in Afghanistan, supplied under a leasing contract starting July 2007 from a Thales/Elbit consortium. Of the 52 operated by the British in Afghanistan and Iraq, seven have crashed in Afghanistan and one in Iraq.

=== United States ===
In initial testing, the Hermes 450 was used to capture pictures of farmland in North Dakota, the only state with an FAA clearance to fly drones above the current federal maximum height limit of 200 feet.

== Operators ==
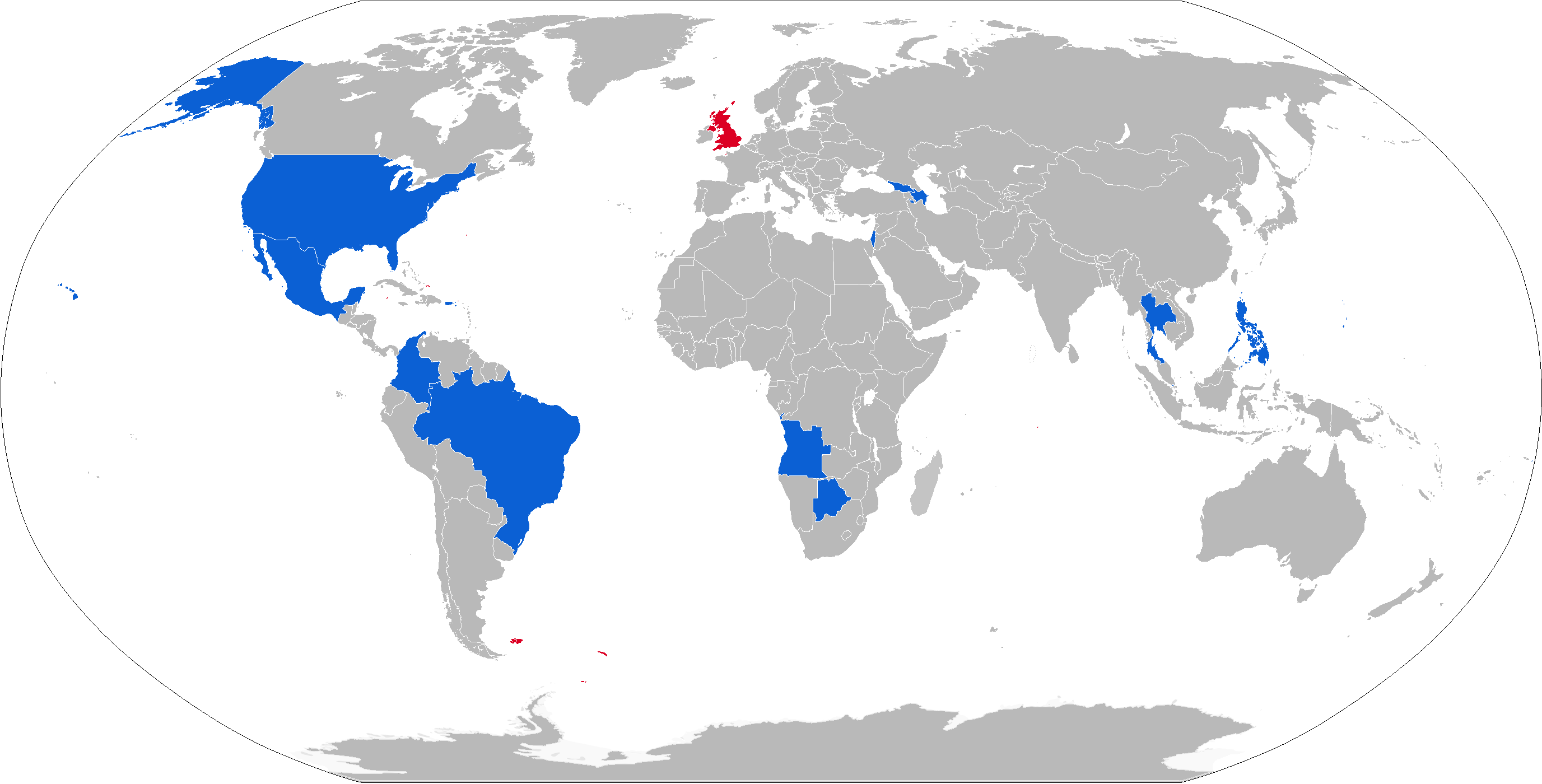
Map with Hermes 450 operators in blue and former operators in red

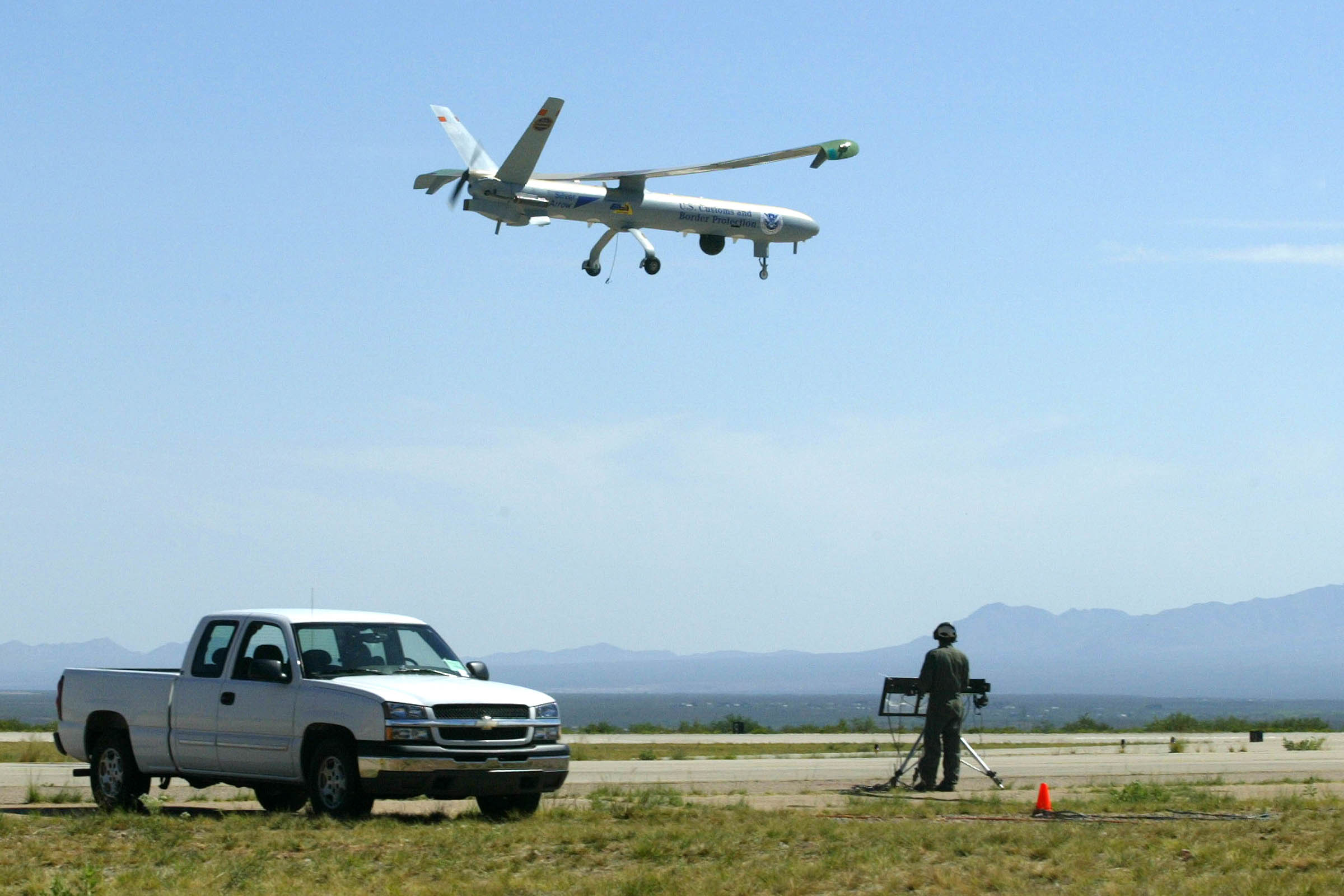
A Hermes 450 landing

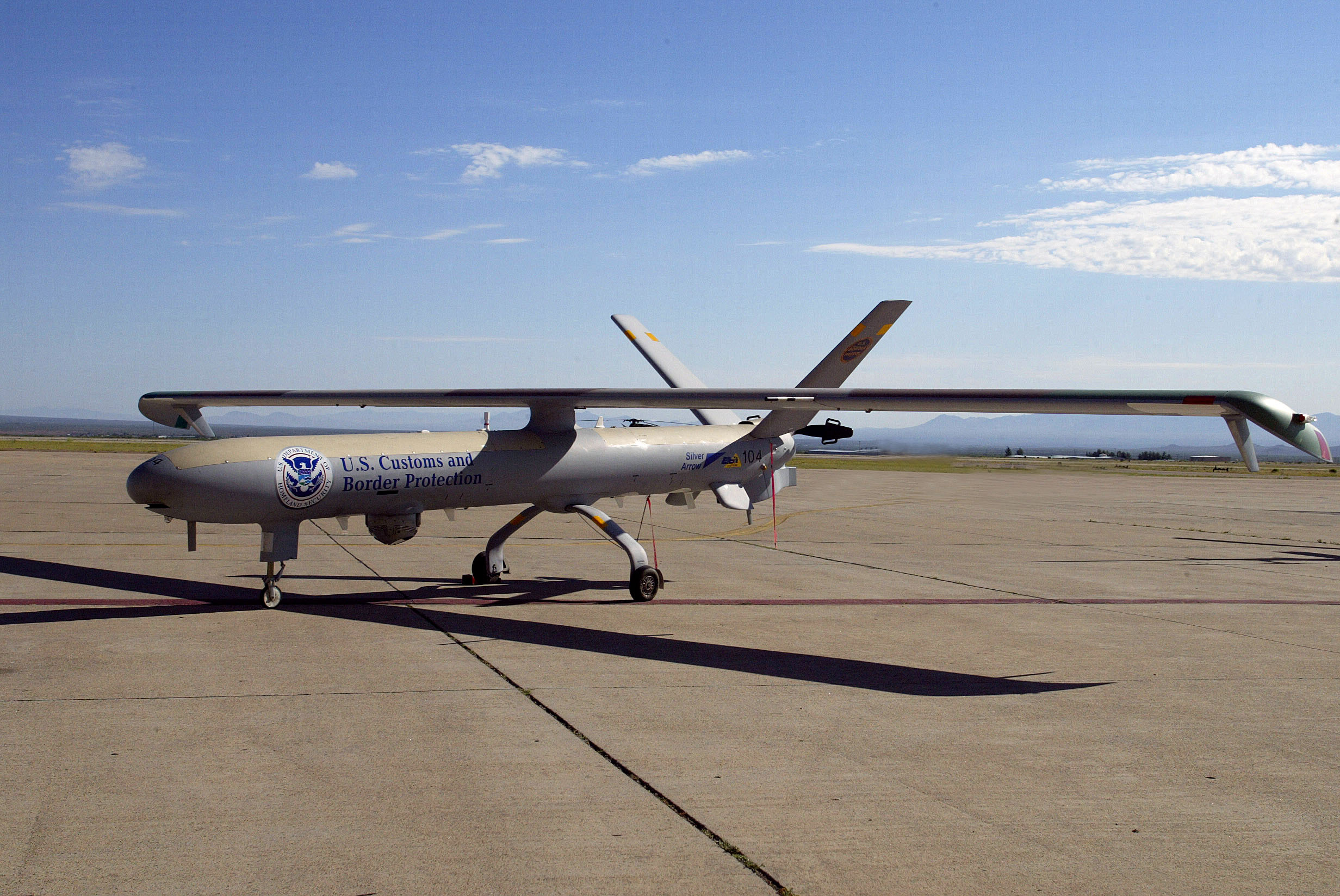
Hermes 450 of the U.S. Customs and Border Protection

Azerbaijan

- 10 Hermes 450 UAVs were purchased in 2008.

Botswana

Brazil

- The Brazilian Air Force has, since December 2009 a unit under lease for 1 year of testing and evaluations in conjunction with the Brazilian Army and Brazilian Navy; there are plans to buy two more. The Brazilian Air Force operated two in 2011, with two more delivered in February 2013.

Colombia

- In August 2012, Elbit won a multimillion-dollar contract to supply a mixed fleet of Hermes 900 and 450 unmanned air systems to Colombia. In July 2013, the Colombian Aerospace Force confirmed they have one Hermes 450 on order, to be accepted in the coming months.

Georgia

- Hermes 450 have also been used by Georgia for reconnaissance over disputed Abkhazia territory, where three were shot down.

Israel

- The Israeli Air Force operates a Hermes 450 squadron out of Palmachim Airbase south of Tel Aviv

North Macedonia

- The North Macedonia Air Brigade operates Hermes 450 systems

Mexico

- The Mexican Air Force acquired the Hermes 450 system in 2009.

Philippines

- Philippine Army - Elbit Systems through a press release on their website announced that they were awarded a US$153 million contract to supply a networked multi-array unmanned aerial system array to a Southeast Asian army. According to Maxdefense, that country is the Philippines and is a part of the C41STAR Unmanned Aerial Systems Acquisition Project of the Philippine Army. The acquisition includes Elbit Thor Multirotor VTOL Mini UAS (Level 1), Elbit Skylark 1-LEX Mini UAS (Level 1), Elbit Skylark 3 Tactical Small UAS (Level 2), and Elbit Hermes 450 Tactical Long Endurance UAS (Level 3).
- The Philippine Air Force received full delivery of three Hermes 900 and one Hermes 450 unmanned aerial systems (UAS) as part of a contract worth approximately $175 million. Each system consists of three unmanned aerial vehicles (UAVs), a ground control system and support equipment. Elbit Systems also included a spare used Hermes 450 UAV as part of the deal, for a total of 9 Hermes 900 UAVs and 4 Hermes 450 UAVs. These units will be operated by the 300th Air Intelligence and Security Wing.

Singapore

- The Singapore Ministry of Defence announced that the Republic of Singapore Air Force is adding the Hermes 450 to its Unmanned Aerial Vehicle fleet, as part of the Air Force's new UAV command. On 21 February 2024, Singapore announced that the Hermes-450 and Heron-I UAVs will be replaced, without naming any potential replacement.

Thailand

- The Royal Thai Army has taken delivery of four Hermes 450 Unmanned Aerial Vehicles, The UAVs are operated by the 21st Aviation Battalion at the Army Aviation Centre at Lopburi.

United States

- Hermes 450s are operated by the U.S. Department of Defense Joint Unmanned Aerial Vehicles Test and Evaluation Program at the Naval Air Station Fallon, and two Hermes 450s were tested by the U.S. Border Patrol in 2004.

Zambia

- At least one Hermes 450 was spotted in Zambian Air Force service in September 2018.

=== Former operators ===
United Kingdom

The British version of Hermes 450 was the only Hermes to use laser gyroscopes in its inertial navigation system. The UK Ministry of Defence did not take up the option for wing mounted armament. The Hermes 450 is the basis of the British Army's Watchkeeper WK450, development of which started in July 2005 in conjunction with Thales. In September 2013, the Hermes 450 reached 70,000 flight hours supporting British troops in Afghanistan, the equivalent of 8 years of non-stop flying. The British had flown the Hermes 450 more than any other country in Afghanistan. As of January 2014, British Hermes 450 air vehicles flew over 86,000 hours over Iraq and Afghanistan. Up to nine aircraft operated from Camp Bastion and conducted five flights per day, accumulating a combined 70 hours of surveillance coverage. When the Watchkeeper WK450 entered service in Afghanistan in mid-September 2014 and the ground-based radar coverage at Bastion was switched off, the British Army stopped using the interim leased Hermes 450. In 2026, Elbit Systems consolidated its control over the Watchkeeper variant program by acquiring Thales UK's remaining shares in their joint venture, UAV Tactical Systems.

== Specifications ==
Data from Elbit Systems Australia

General characteristics

- Crew: 0
- Capacity: 180 kg (400 lb)
- Length: 6.1 m (20 ft 0 in)
- Wingspan: 10.5 m (34 ft 5 in)
- Gross weight: 550 kg (1,213 lb)
- Fuel capacity: 105 kg (231 lb)

Performance

- Maximum speed: 176 km/h (109 mph, 95 kn)
- Cruise speed: 130 km/h (80 mph, 70 kn)
- Stall speed: 78 km/h (48 mph, 42 kn)
- Range: 300 km (190 mi, 160 nmi)
- Endurance: 17 hours (450LE - 30 hours)
- Service ceiling: 5,500 m (18,000 ft)
- Rate of climb: 4.6 m/s (900 ft/min)
- Max mission radius: 200 km (120 mi; 110 nmi)

=== Armaments ===
- 4 × Spike (missile) or 4 × Mikholit missile

== See also ==
- Shield AI MQ-35 V-BAT
- Wingtra WingtraOne
- Rudrastra
