= List of Israeli Air Force aircraft squadrons =

This is a list of Israeli Air Force aircraft squadrons.

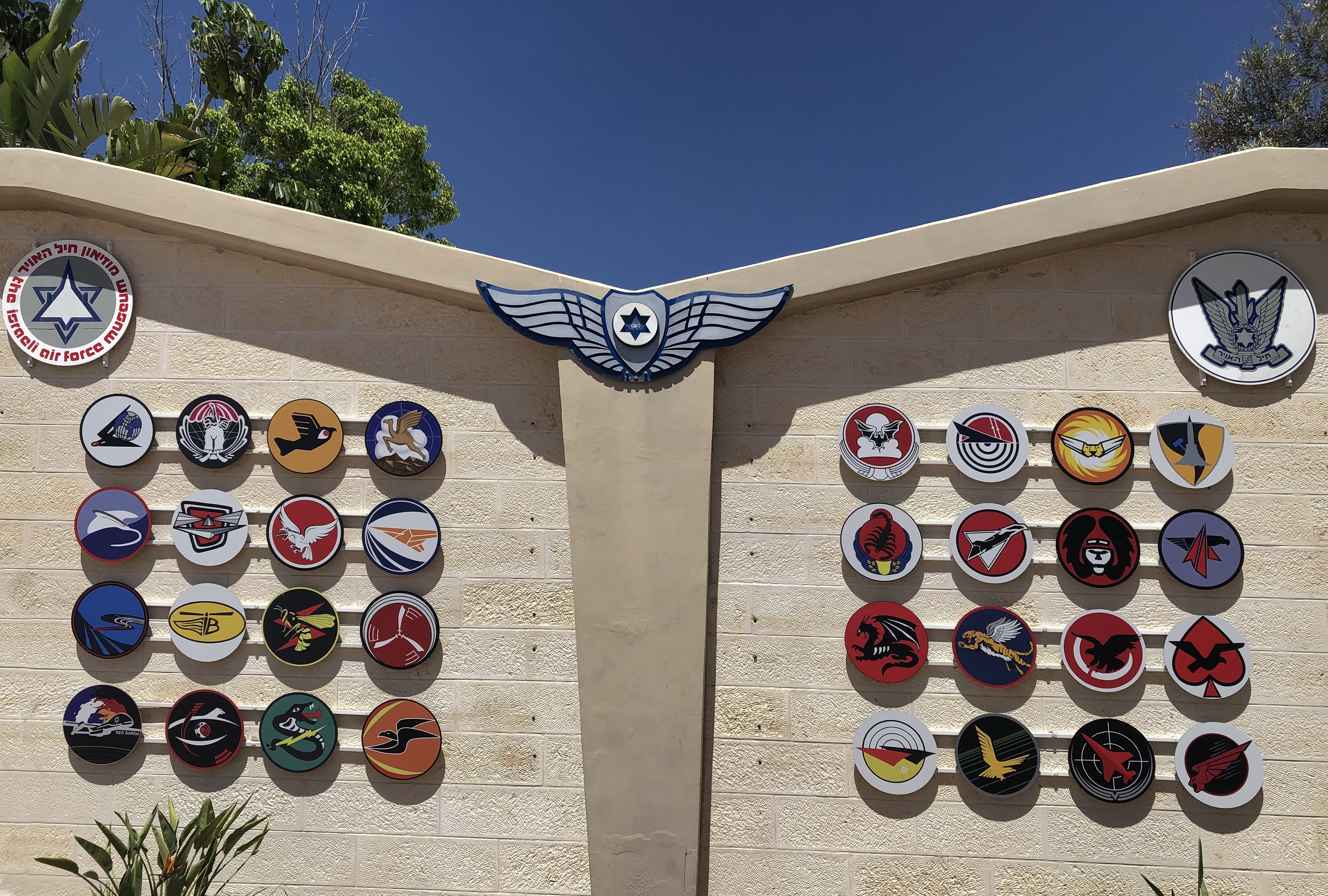
Israeli Air Force squadron emblems

== Combat ==
Unit	Name	Original name	Stationed	Aircraft	Status
69 Squadron	The Hammers Squadron	טייסת הפטישים	Hatzerim Airbase	Retired: Boeing B-17 Flying Fortress, Consolidated PBY Catalina, McDonnell Douglas F-4 Phantom II; Active: McDonnell Douglas F-15I	Active
101 Squadron	The First Fighter Squadron	טייסת הקרב הראשונה	Ramat David Airbase	Retired: Republic RC-3 Seabee, Avia S-199, Supermarine Spitfire, North American P-51 Mustang, Dassault Mystère IV, Dassault Mirage III, IAI Nesher, IAI Kfir; Active: General Dynamics F-16C	Active
105 Squadron	The Scorpion Squadron	טייסת העקרב	Ramat David Airbase	Retired: Supermarine Spitfire, North American P-51 Mustang, Dassault Super Mystère, McDonnell Douglas F-4 Phantom II; Active: General Dynamics F-16D	Active
106 Squadron	The Spearhead Squadron	טייסת חוד החנית	Tel Nof Airbase	Retired: Curtiss-Wright C-46 Commando, Lockheed C-69, Douglas C-54 Skymaster, Lockheed Hudson, Lockheed Model 18 Lodestar; Active: McDonnell Douglas F-15 Eagle	Active
107 Squadron	The Knights of the Orange Tail Squadron	טייסת אבירי הזנב הכתום	Hatzerim Airbase	Retired: Supermarine Spitfire, North American P-51 Mustang, Gloster Meteor, Dassault Ouragan, McDonnell Douglas F-4 Phantom II; Active: General Dynamics F-16I	Active
109 Squadron	The Valley Squadron	טייסת העמק	Ramat David Airbase	Retired: de Havilland Mosquito, Dassault Mystère IV, Douglas A-4 Skyhawk, IAI Kfir; Active: General Dynamics F-16D	Active
110 Squadron	The Knights of North Squadron	טייסת אבירי הצפון	Ramat David Airbase	Retired: de Havilland Mosquito, Sud Aviation Vautour, Gloster Meteor, Douglas A-4 Skyhawk, IAI Kfir, General Dynamics F-16C	Inactive
116 Squadron	The Lions of the South Squadron	טייסת אריות הדרום	Nevatim Airbase	Retired: North American P-51 Mustang, Dassault Mystère IV, Douglas A-4 Skyhawk, General Dynamics F-16A/B; Active: Lockheed Martin F-35I	Active
117 Squadron	The 1st Jet Squadron	טייסת הסילון הראשונה	Nevatim Airbase	Retired: Gloster Meteor, Dassault Mirage III, IAI Nesher, General Dynamics F-16C; Active: Lockheed Martin F-35I	Active
119 Squadron	The Bat Squadron	טייסת העטלף	Ramon Airbase	Retired: Gloster Meteor, Sud Aviation Vautour, Dassault Mirage III, McDonnell Douglas F-4 Phantom II; Active: General Dynamics F-16I	Active
133 Squadron	The Twin-Tail Knights Squadron	טייסת אבירי הזנב הכפול	Tel Nof Airbase	Active: McDonnell Douglas F-15 Eagle	Active
140 Squadron	The Golden Eagle Squadron	טייסת נשר הזהב	Nevatim Airbase	Retired: Harvard, Douglas A-4 Skyhawk, General Dynamics F-16A/B; Active: Lockheed Martin F-35I	Active
149 Squadron	The Smashing Parrot Squadron	טייסת התוכי המנפץ	Hatzor Airbase	Retired: Douglas A-4 Skyhawk, IAI Kfir	Inactive
201 Squadron	The One Squadron	טייסת האחת	Ramon Airbase	Retired: Dassault Mystère IV, McDonnell Douglas F-4 Phantom II; Active: General Dynamics F-16I	Active
253 Squadron	The Negev Squadron	טייסת הנגב	Ramon Airbase	Retired: Dassault Mirage III (only for a short time), IAI Nesher, IAI Kfir, General Dynamics F-16A/B; Active: General Dynamics F-16I	Active

== Helicopter ==
Unit	Name	Original name	Stationed	Aircraft	Status
113 Squadron	The Hornet Squadron	טייסת הצרעה	Ramon Airbase	Retired: Dassault Ouragan, IAI Nesher, IAI Kfir, Boeing AH-64A Apache; Active: Boeing AH-64D Apache Longbow	Active
114 Squadron	The Night Guides Squadron	טייסת מובילי הלילה	Tel Nof Airbase	Retired: Avro Anson, Airspeed Consul, Aérospatiale Super Frelon, Sikorsky CH-53 Sea Stallion	Inactive
118 Squadron	The Nocturnal Birds of Prey Squadron	טייסת דורסי הלילה	Tel Nof Airbase	Active: Sikorsky CH-53 Sea Stallion	Active
123 Squadron	The Desert Birds Squadron	טייסת ציפורי המדבר	Palmachim Airbase	Retired: Bell 47, Bell 205, Bell 212; Active: Sikorsky UH-60 Black Hawk	Active
124 Squadron	The Rolling Sword Squadron	טייסת החרב המתהפכת	Palmachim Airbase	Retired: Hiller OH-23 Raven, Sikorsky H-19 (S-55), Aérospatiale Alouette II, Sikorsky H-34 (S-58), Bell 205, Bell 212, Eurocopter HH-65 Dolphin; Active: Sikorsky UH-60 Black Hawk	Active
125 Squadron	The Light Choppers Squadron	טייסת המסוקים הקלים	Sde Dov Airport	Retired: Aérospatiale Alouette II, Bell 47, Bell 212, Bell 206, Aérospatiale Gazelle, Bell 206L LongRanger	Inactive
190 Squadron	The Magic Touch Squadron	טייסת מגע הקסם	Ramat David Airbase	Retired: MD 500 Defender; Active: Boeing AH-64A Apache	Active
193 Squadron	The Defenders of the West Squadron	טייסת מגיני המערב	Ramat David Airbase	Retired: Eurocopter HH-65 Dolphin, Eurocopter AS565; Active: Sikorsky SH-60F Seahawk	Active

== Command and transport ==
Unit	Name	Original name	Stationed	Aircraft	Status
46 Squadron	Gideon Squadron	טייסת גדעון	Nevatim Airbase	Active: Boeing KC-46	Active
100 Squadron	The Flying Camel Squadron	טייסת הגמל המעופף	Hatzor Airbase	Retired: Piper PA-18, Fokker S-11, Cessna 180, Cessna 206, Piaggio P.149, Dornier Do 27, Dornier Do 28; Active: Beechcraft Super King Air, Beechcraft C-12 Huron, Beechcraft Bonanza	Active
103 Squadron	The Elephants Squadron	טייסת הפילים	Nevatim Airbase	Retired: Bristol Beaufighter, Lockheed Hudson, Lockheed Model 18 Lodestar, Grumman Widgeon, de Havilland Mosquito, Douglas DC-3, Douglas DC-5, Consolidated PBY Catalina, Nord Noratlas, Lockheed C-130 Hercules; Active: Lockheed Martin C-130J Super Hercules	Active
120 Squadron	The Desert Giants Squadron	טייסת ענקי המדבר	Nevatim Airbase	Retired: Douglas DC-3, Boeing 377, Lockheed C-130 Hercules, IAI SeaScan; Active: Boeing 707	Active
122 Squadron	The Nahshon Squadron	טייסת הנחשון	Nevatim Airbase	Retired: Douglas DC-3, Grumman OV-1 Mohawk, IAI Arava; Active: Gulfstream G500 SEMA, Gulfstream G550 CAEW	Active
131 Squadron	The Knights of the Yellow Bird Squadron	טייסת אבירי הציפור הצהובה	Nevatim Airbase	Active: Lockheed C-130 Hercules	Active
135 Squadron	The Kings of the Air Squadron	טייסת מלכי האוויר	Sde Dov Airport	Retired: Socata Rallye, Cessna 180, Cessna 206, Britten-Norman Islander, Beechcraft Queen Air, Socata TB, Beechcraft Super King Air, Beechcraft C-12 Huron, Beechcraft Bonanza	Inactive
192 Squadron	The Hawkeye Squadron	טייסת ההוקאיי	Hatzerim Airbase	Retired: Northrop Grumman E-2 Hawkeye	Inactive

== Unmanned ==
Unit	Name	Original name	Stationed	Aircraft	Status
144 Squadron	The Phoenix Squadron	טייסת עוף החול	Hatzor Airbase	Retired: IAI Nesher, IAI Kfir, General Dynamics F-16A/B; Active: Orbiter 4	Active
147 Squadron	The Goring Ram Squadron	טייסת האיל הנוגח	Palmachim Airbase	Retired: Boeing-Stearman Model 75, Douglas A-4 Skyhawk; Active: Elbit Hermes 900	Active
157 Squadron	The Unit (or: The Only One) in the Valley	היחידה שבעמק	Ramat David Airbase	Active: Classified	Active
160 Squadron	The Shadow Hunter Squadron	טייסת ציידי הצללים	Ramat David Airbase	Retired: MD 500 Defender, Bell AH-1 Cobra; Active: Classified	Active
161 Squadron	The Black Snake Squadron	טייסת הנחש השחור	Palmachim Airbase	Active: Elbit Hermes 450	Active
166 Squadron	The Fire Birds Squadron	טייסת ציפורי האש	Palmachim Airbase	Retired: Elbit Hermes 450; Active: Elbit Hermes 900	Active
200 Squadron	The 1st UAV Squadron	טייסת המל"טים הראשונה	Hatzor Airbase	Retired: Ryan Firebee I, BQM-74 Chukar, Ryan Firebee II, IAI Scout, IAI Searcher I, IAI Searcher II; Active: IAI Heron	Active
210 Squadron	The White Eagle Squadron	טייסת הנשר הלבן	Tel Nof Airbase	Active: IAI Eitan	Active
254 Squadron	The Midland Squadron	טייסת מרכז המדינה	Hatzor Airbase	Retired: Dassault Mirage III (only for a short time), IAI Nesher, IAI Kfir; Active: IAI Heron	Active

== Special ==
Unit	Emblem	Name	Original name	Stationed	Aircraft	Status
102 Squadron; Flight Training School		The Flying Tiger Squadron (M-346 only)	טייסת הנמר המעופף	Hatzerim Airbase	Retired: Fouga Magister, Douglas A-4 Skyhawk, Bell 212, Bell AH-1 Cobra, Bell 206; Active: Grob G-120, Beechcraft T-6 Texan II, Beechcraft King Air, Alenia Aermacchi M-346 Master, AgustaWestland AW119 Koala	Active
115 Squadron; Aggressor Emulation		The Flying Dragon Squadron	טייסת הדרקון המעופף	Ovda Airbase	Retired: de Havilland Mosquito, Gloster Meteor, Douglas A-4 Skyhawk, Bell AH-1 Cobra, General Dynamics F-16A/B, Lockheed Martin F-16C/D	Inactive
151 Squadron; Missile Test Squadron		151 Missile Test Squadron	151 יחידת ניסוי טילים	Palmachim Airbase	Active: Shavit 2, Jericho (missile), Arrow (missile family)	Active
5601 Squadron; Flight Test Center		Flight Test Center Manat	מרכז ניסויי טיסה	Tel Nof Airbase	Retired: IAI Kfir, Mikoyan-Gurevich MiG-23, McDonnell Douglas F-4 Phantom II, Mikoyan MiG-29; Active: McDonnell Douglas F-15C/D Eagle, McDonnell Douglas F-15I, Lockheed Martin F-16C/D, Lockheed Martin F-16I, Lockheed Martin F-35I	Active

== MRBM/ICBM ==
- 150 Squadron (Israel)
- 199 Squadron (Israel)
- 248 Squadron (Israel)
