= 254 Squadron =

254 Squadron may refer to:

- 254 Squadron (Israel)
- No. 254 Squadron RAF, United Kingdom
