= 135 Squadron =

135 Squadron may refer to:

- No. 135 Squadron RCAF, see list of Royal Canadian Air Force squadrons
- 135 Squadron (Israel)
- No. 135 Squadron RAF, United Kingdom
- 135th Aero Squadron, United States Army Air Service
- 135th Airlift Squadron, United States Air Force
- VAQ-135, United States Navy
