= Taba International Airport =

Airport in Egypt

- IATA: TCP; ICAO: HETB

Summary
- Airport type: Public
- Operator: Government
- Serves: Taba, Egypt
- Location: Taba
- Elevation AMSL: 2,415 ft / 736 m
- Coordinates: 29°35′16″N 34°46′41″E

Map
- Location of airport in Sinai

Runways
Direction	Length		Surface
Direction	m	ft	Surface
04/22	4,118	13,513	Asphalt
14/32	3,392	11,130	concrete
- Source: DAFIF GCM

Taba International Airport (Arabic: مطار طابا الدولي) (IATA: TCP, ICAO: HETB) is an international airport located on the Sinai Plateau, with an elevation of 2,470 ft, and serves Taba, Egypt. It has only one gate from which mainly charter flights operate.

== History ==
The airport was constructed by Israel in 1972 during its occupation of Sinai following the Six-Day War. Known as the Etzion Air Force Base, it was demilitarized in 1979 with the Egypt–Israel peace treaty. Then Israel's "Golden Eagle", "Phoenix", and "Smashing Parrot" squadrons moved out and the land there was restored to Egyptian control.

A condition of that peace treaty allows tourists to visit certain areas in Egypt, near Taba, for up to 14 days, without a visa. So from Israel and Jordan, travelers and tourists cross the border at Taba, in buses to visit resorts. Egyptian taxis can take fares up to the Israel border but no further.

The airport is located 13 kilometers from Taba and 30 kilometers from Taba Heights, near El Nakb, and adjacent to Eilat, Israel. The airport was named El Nakb Airport. A new terminal building and night lighting was added and the airport was then renamed Taba International Airport in November 2000.

The airport receives charter flights. Traffic at the airport declined considerably. In 2014, the airport served 41,142 and in 2015, only 13,488 (a 67.2% decline). In 2016, it was announced that Thales Group would be modernizing air traffic management at Taba International Airport.

In May 2018, it was announced that charter flights to the airport would resume, initially with flights from Poland and then from the Czech Republic.

As of 2023, Taba Airport is served by charter flights from Katowice, Prague, Brno and Bratislava.

During the 2026 Israeli–United States strikes on Iran and subsequent closure of Israeli airspace, Israeli airline Arkia began a shuttle service between Taba and Athens to allow air access to Israel's southern border town of Eilat.

== Airlines and destinations ==
Airlines	Destinations
Egyptair	Seasonal charter: Cairo
LOT Polish Airlines	Seasonal charter: Warsaw–Chopin
Smartwings	Seasonal charter: Brno, Budapest, Katowice, Prague, Warsaw–Chopin

== See also ==
- Transport in Egypt
- List of airports in Egypt
- List of the busiest airports in the Middle East
