= Israeli Air Force flight over Auschwitz =

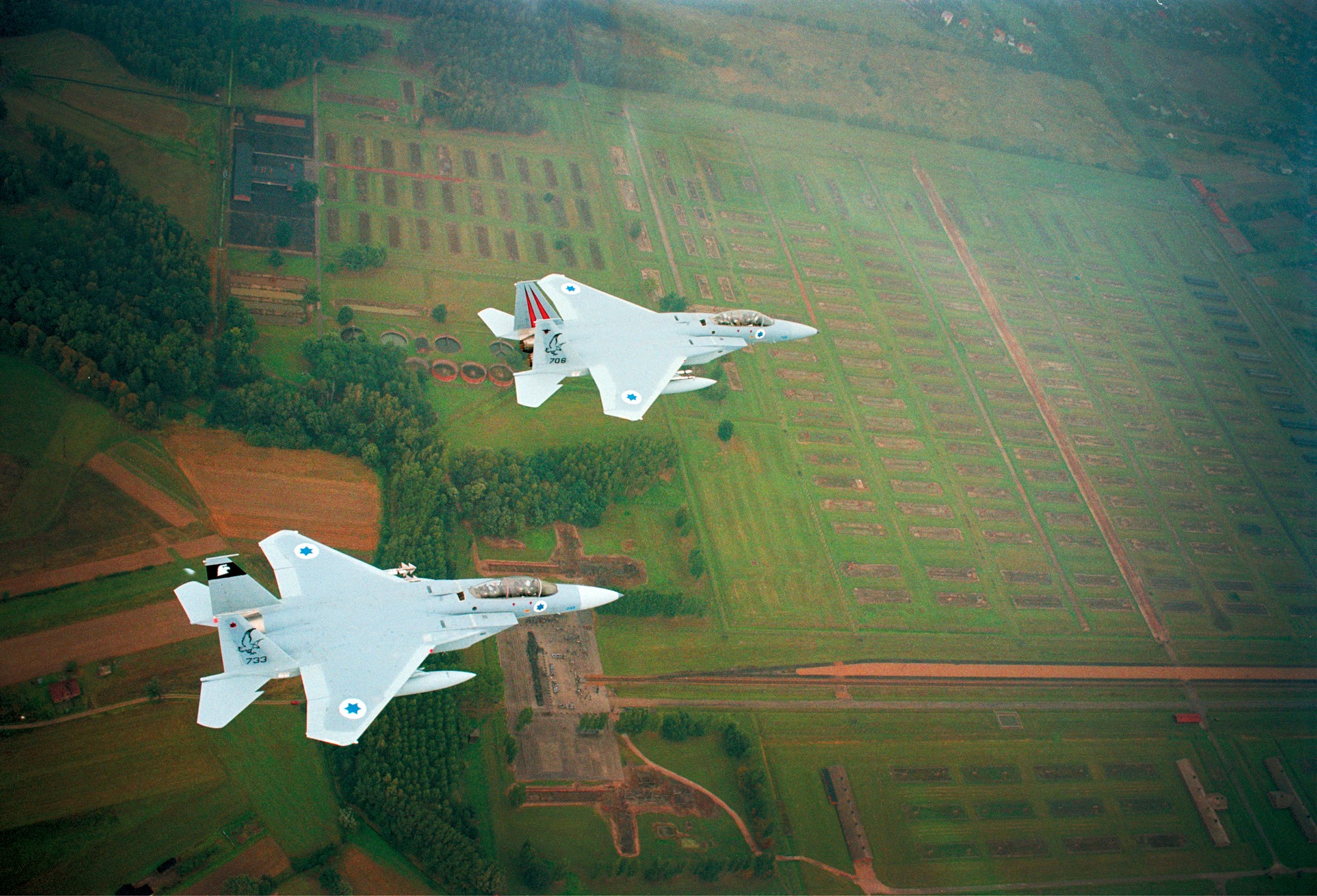
Israeli Air Force F-15 Eagle fighters overflying Auschwitz

In 2003, the Polish Air Force invited the Israeli Air Force to participate in the Radom Air Show to mark the 85th anniversary of the establishment of the Polish Air Force. Amir Eshel, then a Brigadier General, was an amateur historian who had investigated the question of why the Allies did not bomb Auschwitz during World War II. He implored his commander, Dan Halutz, to accept the invitation with the condition that some of the planes could fly from Radom to Auschwitz as a tribute to the victims of the Holocaust. Eshel, himself a son of Holocaust survivors, along with pilots Avi Maor and Avi Lebkowitz and weapon systems officer Shimshon Rozen, participated in the air fair with both ground and aerial displays.

The flight from Warsaw Radom Airport to Israel included the flyover of Auschwitz, nicknamed Flight 301, so the pilots did not have to change or extend their flight route. On September 4, 2003, three F-15 fighter jets took off from the Radom airport in bad weather and flew about 200 km above a thick layer of clouds before descending to a low altitude of 1,200 feet and flying in formation over the camp. They flew over the gate, the railway, the ramp, and the array of Israel Defense Forces soldiers, while Amir Eshel read a short paragraph he had written especially for the occasion over the intercom system. The paragraph honored the victims of the Holocaust and reaffirmed the commitment of the Israeli Air Force to protecting the Jewish people and their country, Israel:

We pilots of the Air Force, flying in the skies above the camp of horrors, arose from the ashes of the millions of victims and shoulder their silent cries, salute their courage and promise to be the shield of the Jewish people and its nation Israel.

Haaretz columnist Ari Shavit wrote:

Flight 301 was one of the most unusual operations ever carried out by the Israeli Air Force.

== Objections by the Auschwitz-Birkenau Museum ==
The Auschwitz-Birkenau State Museum, which covers the site of both Auschwitz I and Auschwitz II-Birkenau, strongly objected to the flyover by Israeli military aircraft. A statement issued by the museum read:

The National Museum of Auschwitz-Birkenau deplores the demonstration of Israeli military might in this place.

A spokesman for the museum, Jaroslaw Mensfelt, said: "It's a cemetery, a place of silence and concentration," and that "Flying the [F-15s] is a demonstration of military might which is an entirely inappropriate way to commemorate the victims." Mensfelt also said that the museum had not been consulted about the flyover, and that the International Auschwitz Council, an advisory body to the museum headed by Auschwitz survivor Wladyslaw Bartoszewski, also "does not support such a way to commemorate the victims."

Shevach Weiss, the then-ambassador of Israel to Poland, responded to the objections by insisting that the flyover was "not a demonstration of military power" and that "officers do not fight here, they cry here". Israeli foreign ministry spokesman Jonathan Peled said that the event was being staged with the full co-operation of Polish authorities, describing the event as "a joint Israeli-Polish initiative and for a noble cause". Organizers also insisted that the idea for the flyover was prompted by the fact that the planes coincidentally happened to be in Poland for the air show.

== Other reactions ==
Others who objected to the flyover included American novelist and child of Holocaust survivors Thane Rosenbaum, who said that "This isn’t supposed to be a showcase for the Israeli military," and "This isn’t supposed to be a time for making loud noise that overshadows the whispering of ghosts but a time to reflect about the things that were lost." A spokesman of the ultra-orthodox group Agudath Israel of America, rabbi Avi Shafran, said that "Even when Jews have had to wage war, whether in biblical or more recent times, the truly Jewish-minded among them have eschewed glorifying warfare or its weapons", and that "Whatever the merit of the museum’s objections to the fly-over, there is a valid Jewish objection to attempting to honor the murdered with what was surely seen as a show of military might".

The flyover was defended by American rabbi Irving Greenberg, who said that "What made the Shoah possible was the powerlessness and helplessness of the Jews. It’s not Zionist propaganda, just a basic fact." The flyover was also defended by the David S. Wyman Institute for Holocaust Studies, whose director Dr. Rafael Medoff said the event was "an important reminder that Allied planes flew over the notorious Nazi death camp in 1944, but knowingly failed to bomb the gas chambers and crematoria where 1.5-million Jews were murdered".
