= Giora Epstein =

Israeli fighter pilot (1938–2025)

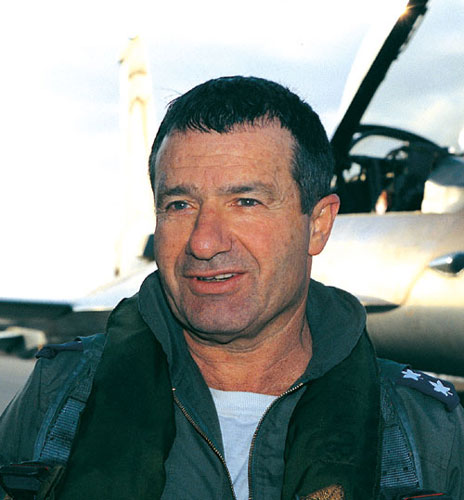
- Epstein in 1998
- Born: 20 May 1938; Negba, Mandatory Palestine
- Died: 19 July 2025 (aged 87); Ramat HaSharon, Israel
- Military career
- Allegiance: Israel
- Branch: Israeli Air Force
- Service years: 1956–1997
- Rank: Tat aluf
- Nickname: Enei netz (Hawkeye)
- Battles and wars: Arab–Israeli conflict; Six-Day War; War of Attrition; Yom Kippur War
- Other work: El Al pilot (1977–1997)

Brigadier General Giora Epstein (Hebrew: גיורא אפשטיין; 20 May 1938 – 19 July 2025), later known as Giora Even (Hebrew: גיורא אבן), was an Israeli Air Force (IAF) officer and a fighter ace credited with 17 victories, 16 against Egyptian jets and one against an Egyptian Mi-8 helicopter, making Epstein the ace of aces of supersonic fighter jets and of the Israeli Air Force. Epstein was an active IAF pilot from 1961 until 26 May 1997, when he retired at age 59. Like many retired IAF flyers, he later worked as a pilot for El Al Airlines.

== Early life and career ==
Epstein was born to Polish immigrants in kibbutz Negba on 20 May 1938. At a young age, he developed a passion for aviation while watching IAF aircraft fly over his kibbutz. While enrolled in high school, he volunteered in kibbutz Givat Brenner's scouts' unit.

Epstein joined the Israel Defense Forces (IDF) in 1956 and began training with the 4th Airborne Division, although this was disrupted by the outbreak of the Suez Crisis and he was reassigned into the IAF's Ordnance Corps. He was initially rejected from flight school because of a heart condition and later volunteered as a paratrooper in the Paratroopers Brigade's Efah Battalion. While traveling with the IDF's parachute demonstration team, Epstein changed his last name to Even ("stone" in Hebrew). He left the IDF in 1959 before returning three years later as a parachuting instructor, during which he reapplied to flight school and was accepted after gaining medical clearance.

After graduating with honors in 1963, Epstein was assigned to pilot helicopters in the 124 Squadron. Unsatisfied with this position, he appealed to IAF commander Ezer Weizman, who later personally met with him. According to Epstein, Weizman told him: "Listen, you piece of shit, I couldn't sleep all night because of you. Pack your bags and get to the fighter squadron. I don't want to hear from you again." After the exchange, he was assigned to a Mirage fighter squadron. He soon gained the nickname "Hawkeye" or "Eagle Eye" due to his extraordinary eyesight. Epstein was allegedly able to spot aircraft at a distance of 24 miles (38.4 km) — nearly three times further than a normal pilot.

== Victories: 1967–1973 ==
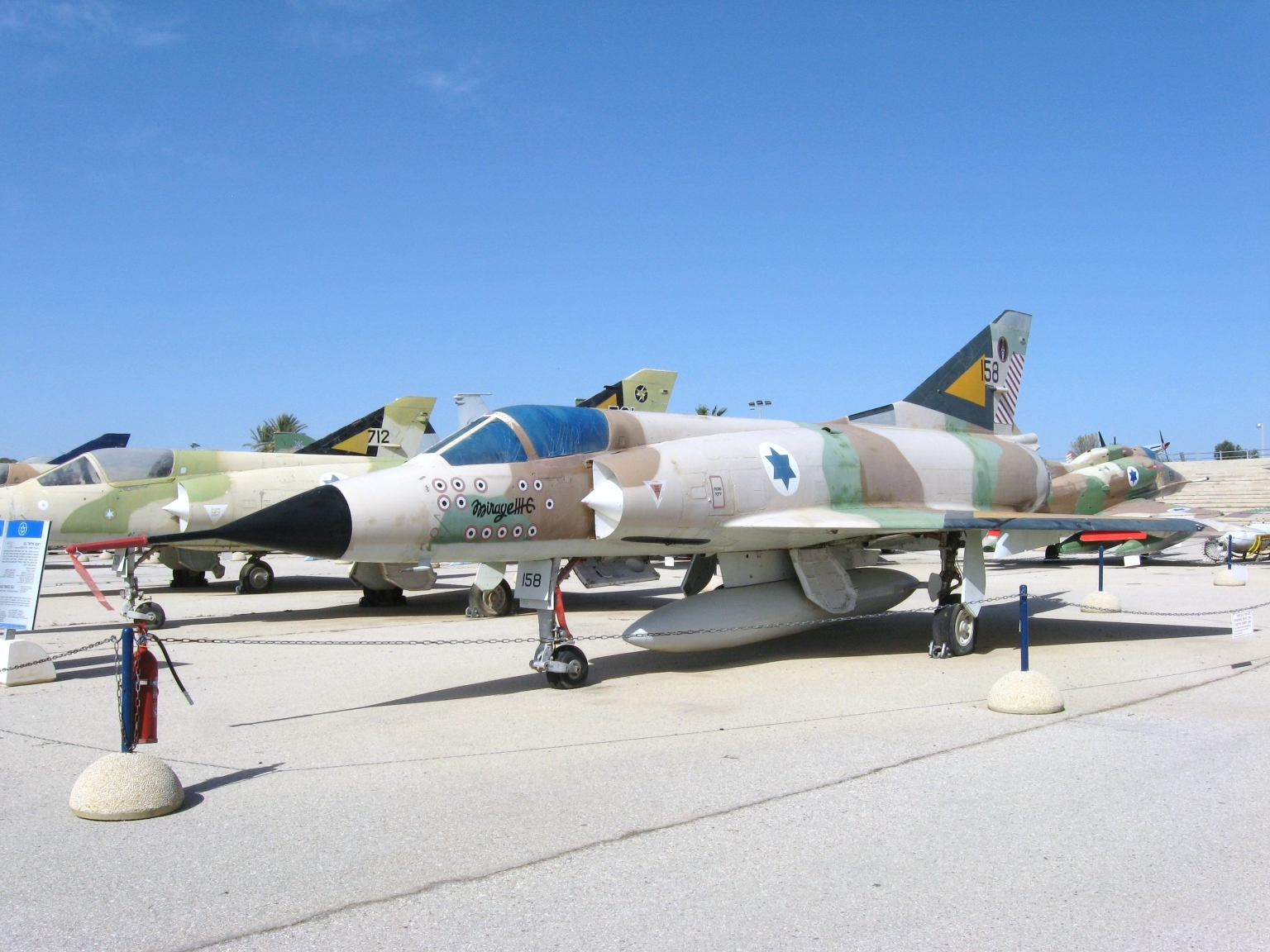
Israeli Air Force Mirage IIICJ

Epstein's first kill came on 6 June 1967 during the Six-Day War, when he downed an Egyptian Sukhoi-7 at El Arish in a Dassault Mirage III. During the War of Attrition in 1969–70, Epstein downed four more aircraft: a MiG-17, another Sukhoi-7 and two MiG-21s. Two of his kills occurred when Epstein and IAF officer Israel Baharav lured a squadron of four Egyptian MiGs into an ambush, resulting in the downing of all four aircraft. A fifth Egyptian aircraft that joined the battle was shot down by Baharav. The shoot-downs brought his total number of kills to five, earning him the title "flying ace".

The rest of his kills, 12 in total, came during the 1973 Yom Kippur War, of which Epstein played a major role in the build-up. On 6 October 1973, at 2:00 p.m., Epstein activated warning sirens across Israel that signalled the start of the war after aircraft takeoffs were detected at Egyptian and Syrian air bases. Between 18 and 20 October, he downed an Egyptian Mi-8 helicopter and eight jets: two Sukhoi-7s, two Sukhoi-20s and four MiG-21s. In one dogfight, where Epstein was alone against 10 Egyptian fighter jets, he was able to shoot down four aircraft in a single sortie before retreating to base over a fuel shortage. Then, on 24 October, while leading a quartet of jets that took off from Hatzor to patrol the Suez Canal area, Epstein joined an aerial battle between a quartet led by Baharav and 22 Egyptian MiG-21s. Twelve MiGs were shot down during the dogfight, three by Epstein, while none of the ten Israeli jets (including two that joined towards the end of the battle) were lost. Eight of his victories during his career were with the French-built Mirage III, a delta wing fighter designed primarily as a high-altitude interceptor. His other nine victories came in an IAI Nesher, an Israeli-built version of the Mirage 5. Five of his kills were downed using air-to-air missiles, the rest with cannon.

His 17 victories against Egyptian aircraft rank him the top supersonic fighter jet ace in the world and Israel's most decorated combat pilot.

== Later career ==
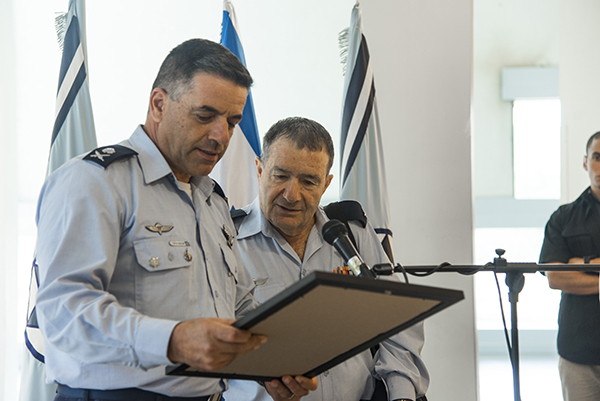
IAF commander Amikam Norkin with Epstein during the ceremony marking his promotion to brigadier general, September 2018

After the Yom Kippur War, Epstein received the Medal of Distinguished Service, one of Israel's highest military honors. He was appointed commander of the IAF's 117 Squadron in 1974 and retired from regular service in 1977. From then, he continued his service as a reservist and was granted permission to pilot the F-16 in 1988. He was discharged in 1997, accumulating 9,000 sorties and 5,000 flight hours over the course of his career. After retiring, he worked as a commercial pilot for El Al until 2003. In 2018, he was promoted to brigadier general by IDF chief of staff Gadi Eisenkot.

Epstein was the primary subject of the "Desert Aces" episode of The History Channel series Dogfights. The episode first aired on 10 August 2007.

== Personal life and death ==
Epstein lived in Ramat HaSharon and was married to Sarah, who served in his squadron as an operations officer. They had three children. In his later life, Epstein participated in the pilots' protest movement.

Epstein died on 19 July 2025, at the age of 87.

== See also ==
- 254 Squadron (Israel)
- 101 Squadron (Israel)
- Nikolai Sutyagin
- Yevgeny Pepelyaev
