= Lockheed Martin F-35 Lightning II Israeli procurement =

Fleet of Lockheed Martin F-35I Adir fighter aircraft used by the Israeli Air Force

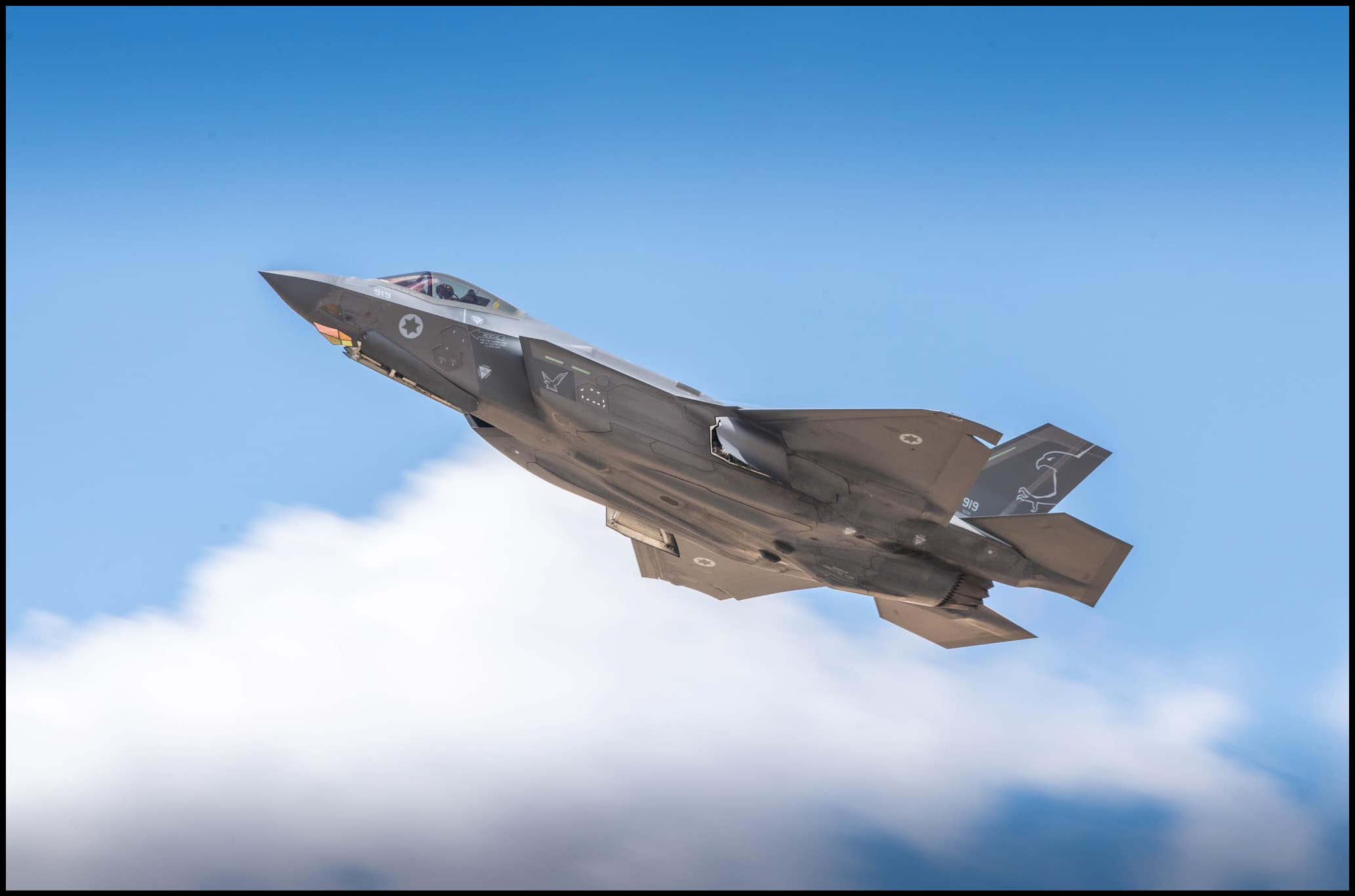
IAF F-35I Adir, 2023

The Lockheed Martin F-35 Lightning II Israeli procurement is the result of an agreement for the government of Israel to purchase the Lockheed Martin F-35 Lightning II for the Israeli Air Force as the F-35I "Adir". The first nine F-35s became operational with the Israeli Air Force in December 2017.

On 22 May 2018, Israeli Air Force commander, Major General Amikam Norkin, reported that Israel had become the first country in the world to use the F-35 in combat. They were also used in the Gaza war.

In November 2020, an F-35I testbed aircraft was delivered. This was the only example of a testbed F-35 delivered to an air force outside of the United States.

As of 13 November 2022, the Israeli Air Force had 36 F-35s in service, including the testbed stationed at the Flight Test Center at Tel Nof Airbase, and operated three squadrons at Nevatim Airbase – the 140th, 116th and 117th.

== Preparation for introduction ==
The IAF's initial plans were to send pilots to the US in 2016 to begin training on the F-35 together with American pilots, and to take the first deliveries of F-35s in late 2016 or early 2017. It was announced in March 2013 that Israel would receive its first F-35s in 2015.

The Israeli F-35s are based at Nevatim Airbase in the Negev. The decision was based on operational, environmental, infrastructure and training considerations, as well as the IDF's strategic vision to transfer some of its bases to the region.

In 2013, it was reported that Israel was building the infrastructure needed to accommodate F-35s, including hardened aircraft shelters, underground pens, and maintenance facilities. The IAF also ordered 30 M-346 trainer jets to train F-35 pilots. Construction of a manufacturing facility to produce wings under license for the F-35 was expected to be completed by mid-2014. The site was to produce a total of 811 wing pairs. Initial orders of the F-35 were for 20 planes, with a total of 75 intended.

In May 2017, it was reported that the first customized F-35I test platform was expected to be delivered to Israel by 2020.

Former Israel Air Force chief Maj.-Gen. (res.) Amir Eshel has called the F-35 "game changing," saying that Israel gathered new intelligence during a single flight by the F-35 in early 2017 that other reconnaissance and intelligence gathering systems would take weeks to gather.

The IAF had received nine aircraft and declared the fleet operational on 6 December 2017.

== Changes from standard F-35A ==
A senior Israeli air force official stated, "the aircraft will be designated F-35I, as there will be unique Israeli features installed in them." The United States initially refused to allow the integration of Israel's own electronic warfare systems into the aircraft's built-in electronic suite. However, Israel planned the introduction of a plug-and-play feature added to the main computer to allow for the use of Israeli electronics in an add-on fashion, and to fit its own external jamming pod. The IAF dispatched two officers to the US where they discussed issues involving the integration of Israeli technology into the fighter with Pentagon and Lockheed Martin officials.

In July 2011, it was reported that the U.S. had agreed to allow Israel to install its own electronic warfare systems and missiles in its F-35s in the future. In 2012 Lockheed was awarded a contract to make changes to the first Israeli F-35s to allow the installation of Israeli electronic warfare equipment produced by Elbit Systems. This equipment will use "specific apertures ... in the lower fuselage and leading edge". Israel also plans to install its own indigenously produced guided bombs and air-to-air missiles in the F-35's internal weapons bay. Benni Cohen compared the Israel Aerospace Industries command and control system to an iPhone App that would run on top of the central avionics.

Israel Aerospace Industries was to manufacture the outer wings of Israel's F-35s. IAI may also play a role in the development of a proposed two-seat F-35. An IAI executive stated, "There is a known demand for two seats not only from Israel but from other air forces. Advanced aircraft are usually two seats rather than single seats." The Israeli F-35s helmet-mounted displays were also to be manufactured in Israel. This is part of the Offset agreement provided to Israel, in spite of the purchase being entirely funded by American aid.

In June 2012, Aviation Week quoted an IAF official stating that while the stealth of the F-35 in its current form was to be overcome in 5–10 years, the aircraft was planned to be in service for 30–40 years, and that is the reason that Israel insisted on the ability to make its own changes to the aircraft's electronic warfare systems.

In March 2014, Channel 12 reported that during the U.S. outfitting of F-35As for nuclear weapons delivery, a senior U.S. official declined to comment on if Israel had requested similar modifications to its F-35Is.

On 9 December 2016, it was reported that the first 19 aircraft were to be delivered as standard F-35As with the remaining 31 to be fully equipped F-35Is.

== Procurement timeline ==
2003

In 2003, Israel signed a formal letter of agreement, worth almost $20 million, to join the System Development and Demonstration (SDD) effort for the F-35 as a "security cooperation participant" (SCP).

2006

The Israeli Air Force stated in 2006 that the F-35 was a key part of its recapitalization plans, and that Israel intended to buy over 100 F-35A fighters at an estimated cost of over $5 billion to replace their F-16s over time. Israel was reinstated as a partner in the development of the F-35 on 31 July 2006, after its participation was put on hold following the Chinese arms deal crisis.

On 16 November 2006, Yaakov Katz of the Jerusalem Post reported that if no jet fighters were delivered to Israel between the last batch of F-16s in 2007 and the first F-35s in 2014 then the IAF would decline in numbers as older fighters wore out and were retired.

2010

On 1 June, it was reported that Rafael Advanced Defense Systems was developing smaller versions of the Python and Derby missiles for carriage within the aircraft, while Israel Military Industries was developing a penetration bomb in the same configuration as the Mk 82 500 lb bomb. However these were put off in order to rush the aircraft into operation as part of Israel's response to Iran's nuclear ambitions.

On 26 July 2010, Israeli Defense Minister Ehud Barak said that he would insist on Israeli industrial participation, including local electronic warfare parts, and weapons, during his trip to the United States. Barak submitted a request to the Israeli cabinet for 20 F-35s for $2.75 billion to be delivered starting in 2015. This included the costs of setting up local firms to assemble the aircraft and manufacture spare parts. The package was to be paid for with American military assistance.

Former head of the IAF, retired Major General Eitan Ben Eliyahu, called the American approval of the deal a key test of Israel – United States relations.

The F-35 is the fighter plane of the future that will allow Israel to maintain its aerial superiority and its technological advantage in the region ... The F-35 will give the IAF better capabilities, both near and far, to help strengthen Israel's national security.

— Israeli Defense Minister Ehud Barak, August 2010

The F-35 deal was pushed through, instead of upgrading the Israeli Air Force's F-15s and F-16s, in a bid to maintain Israel's technological advantage over Arab states. This approach adheres to the Israeli principle that Israel ought to be the first country in the Middle East to receive new fighter aircraft. The IAF was sufficiently committed to this principle to override protests from the leaders of Israeli defense contractors, who claimed that the deal would damage them. A number of members of the Israeli General Staff also criticized the high cost of the deal, which would reduce the funds available for investment in weapons for the land forces and navy.

These aircraft will be designated F-35I, as there will be unique Israeli features installed in them. The total price tag confirmed by Barak indicated that each aircraft costs about $96 million, with further expenses on training, simulators, spare parts, and the building of maintenance infrastructure. The first squadron of 20 F-35 jets, from the first production series, only included a few Israeli-made systems. The United States agreed to allow the installation of more Israeli-made systems if Israel purchased further F-35 squadrons from later production series. To sweeten the deal, Lockheed Martin said it would buy parts and systems for the F-35 from Israeli companies at a cost of $4 billion. Defense Ministry Director-General Udi Shani said that, apart from the jet's operational capacity, a significant factor in closing the deal included agreements that would include Israeli defense contractors in producing the F-35 for other clients.

Israel's three main areas of interest in customization were radar, electronic warfare and communications systems and independent maintenance capabilities.

Richard Genaille, deputy head of the Pentagon's Defense Security Cooperation Agency, has said that installing different electronics on the F-35 would be very costly and "probably will not be in the best interest in the long run of" nations that make such changes.

Israel's guarantees of more than US$4B of aerospace work in exchange for their purchase of 20 F-35s valued at US$2.7B, without any other industrial investment in the program has caused aerospace analysts to question what benefits countries who have invested in the F-35 program will receive. Norway, Denmark and Italy have all expressed concerns that the industrial benefits from the program may be insufficient to justify participation.

On 16 September 2010, a ministerial panel headed by Prime Minister Benjamin Netanyahu and Defense Minister Ehud Barak made a final decision to purchase 20 F-35 fighter jets, despite opposition from a number of senior defense officials over the high cost of the deal.

On 7 October 2010, Ehud Shani, director general of the Israeli Ministry of Defense signed the deal while in New York City. Israel was to get 20 of the warplanes for nearly $3 billion and receive the jets in 2016, while retaining an option for the purchase of additional 75 aircraft.

Syrian Foreign Minister Walid al-Moallem has said that the deal would destabilize the region.

In November 2010, Israel was reportedly offered an additional 20 F-35s in exchange for a continued freeze on Israeli settlements in the West Bank, however State Department spokesman P.J. Crowley has refused to confirm these reports, and the offer was rejected.

2011

Moshe Arens has written that Israel does not need the F-35 to maintain its technological superiority over the Arab countries and would be better off developing its own aircraft that did not have the design compromises of the F-35.

Gur Laish, an expert on the IAF with the Institute for National Security Studies (INSS) at Tel Aviv University, wrote a report that indicated that the F-35 would have a deterrent effect with its ability to make pre-emptive attacks on hostile countries before war is declared, such as on Iran's nuclear facilities. Yiftah S. Shapir, also of the INSS at Tel Aviv University, said that the American refusal to open the fighter to full Israeli control and modification, including making the software codes available, reduces its value, but that the American relationship with Israel is so important that it rules out other alternatives such as the Sukhoi Su-57. He also noted that the earliest deliveries in 2016 would be past the date Iran was expected to have operational nuclear weapons, one of the prime reasons for having the F-35.

In March 2011 it was announced that Israel will pay US$144.7M per aircraft for 19 F-35As, a price that included a share of development, test and evaluation costs.

On 13 April, the Jerusalem Post reported that with the delivery of the F-35s appearing to be delayed until 2018, the Israelis have sought used F-15s from the United States to cover the gap.

While being interviewed by Haaretz in May 2011, Ehud Shani said that "during the last visit by Secretary of Defense Robert Gates to Israel a month ago, we were told that the delay may be shorter than they originally thought. In any case, I am not nervous about it. This [delay] may actually serve our interests. I favor an aircraft with as many Israeli-made systems as possible." He also said that "we will see how they try to meet our requests over this time. In the original timetable, it was argued that there was no time [to incorporate Israeli systems into the Israeli F-35s]. We will hear their conclusions and I expect a dialogue with the Americans over the new timetable and the changes."

The idea that the Air Force will, in the meantime, acquire another squadron of F-15s in order to meet the gap that will be created "is not relevant," he said. The delay may mean that in the future there will be more aircraft coming to Israel in a shorter period of time, and the numbers procured may rise from 20 to 30. Israeli defense officials said that the problems with the F-35 were 'much worse than we had been told' and that a high-level delegation would be sent to the United States to determine the extent of the problems.

Israel has planned to send pilots to train in the United States in 2017 then return to Israel with the 20 jets in 2018.

According to a 7 July 2011 Aviation Week article, the United States has agreed to allow Israeli F-35s to be rewired so that Israeli electronic warfare systems can be installed on the aircraft. That would allow Israel to gradually add indigenous EW sensors and countermeasures on its fighters once it receives its first squadron. With that deal in hand, officials for both the IAF and Lockheed Martin expect the $2.7 billion contract for the procurement of 19 or 20 F-35As will be signed by early 2012.

"I believe that Israel could receive its first F-35s in late 2016," said Tom Burbage, Lockheed Martin's general manager of the F-35 program. A senior IAF official, who until then was concerned about delays in the program, said that the schedule agreed upon is "very satisfactory." Israel insisted that only its own EW systems would be suitable to meet the developing anti-aircraft threat in the region, such as the deployment of SA-17 and SA-22 air defense systems in Syria. But now, claimed the official, "the F-35s we will receive will be more than ready to meet those threats."

The IAF initially presented a long list of unique and costly requirements for the JSF, but it has accepted that its first F-35s will be almost identical to those of the United States Air Force, with only Israeli command, control, computers, communications and intelligence systems installed in them. The plans to add Israeli EW systems, air-to-air and air-to-ground munitions as well as an external fuel tank, were approved in principle but were deferred in order to protect the budgetary framework and delivery schedule.

According to the program schedule at that time, Israeli F-35s was to be manufactured within the seventh and eighth low-rate initial production (LRIP) lot. The LRIP 5 cost was being negotiated by the Pentagon and Lockheed Martin. "Israel could still be the first international customer to receive the JSF," said Burbage. One issue that remained to be settled between the two countries is when IAF crews would begin training on the F-35s and on whose platforms. Burbage said that training could commence in 2016, but it is for the Pentagon to decide which aircraft was to be made available for Israeli training.

Facing the possibility that the dramatic changes in the Middle East could turn peaceful neighbors Egypt and Jordan more hostile to Israel, the Israel Defense Forces aimed to build a larger, more flexible force, capable of dealing with more than the traditional northern front of Syria and Lebanon. The IAF claimed to be the only service with that flexibility, and it called for accelerating the plan to procure 75 F-35s by 2030.

In the following years, the Air Force was to begin decommissioning dozens of its aging fighters, such as F-16s and F-15s, and with only 20 new F-35s, its fighter fleet would reach its lowest point ever. However, there was strong competition for funding. Israeli ground commanders argued that because of the potential threat that the giant and modern Egyptian army would be turned against Israel, it is necessary to establish an additional mechanized division, equipped with Merkava tanks and the new Namer armored personnel carrier. The production of the Namer was moved to General Dynamics Land Systems in the U.S. in order to enable Israel to procure them using US military aid funding, the same funding source used to acquire the F-35s.

According to the Jerusalem Post, IAF officers said on 31 July 2011 that they did not anticipate that the delivery date for the F-35 would slip beyond 2017. If it did, the IAF would have needed to consider other options for that time period, such as additional F-15s to fill the gap that would be created in the event that the JSF program is further delayed.

On 1 August 2011, the Jerusalem Post reported that the IAF planned to purchase a second squadron of F-35s during the upcoming IDF multi-year procurement plan that was then under review by the General Staff. The second contract would have likely been of a similar number of aircraft and, depending on when the second deal was signed, the IAF could have had 40 operational aircraft by the end of the decade.

2013

The Japanese government has discussed whether the export of F-35s containing Japanese products to Israel violates their laws against arms exports to countries involved in or likely to be involved in military conflicts.

Israeli military officials were reported to have said that the F-35 was chosen for its situational awareness capabilities.

The first two Israeli F-35As were to be in LRIP 8.

In 2013, Lockheed Martin vice president, Steve O'Bryan, said that they were "examining the feasibility" of adding stealthy conformal fuel tanks manufactured by Elbit Systems.

2014

In October, Israel confirmed an order with the defence secretary for 25 more aircraft to equip a second squadron of F-35s. However, ministerial committee member Yuval Steinitz, opposing the IDF plan, believed that order should possibly be halved due to concerns about the F-35's range, payload and maneuverability suiting Israel's needs.

2015

In February, Israel signed a contract for the procurement of another 14 F-35As in a $2.82 billion deal, with a unit cost of about $110 million. An option for another 17 aircraft was included in the contract.

2016

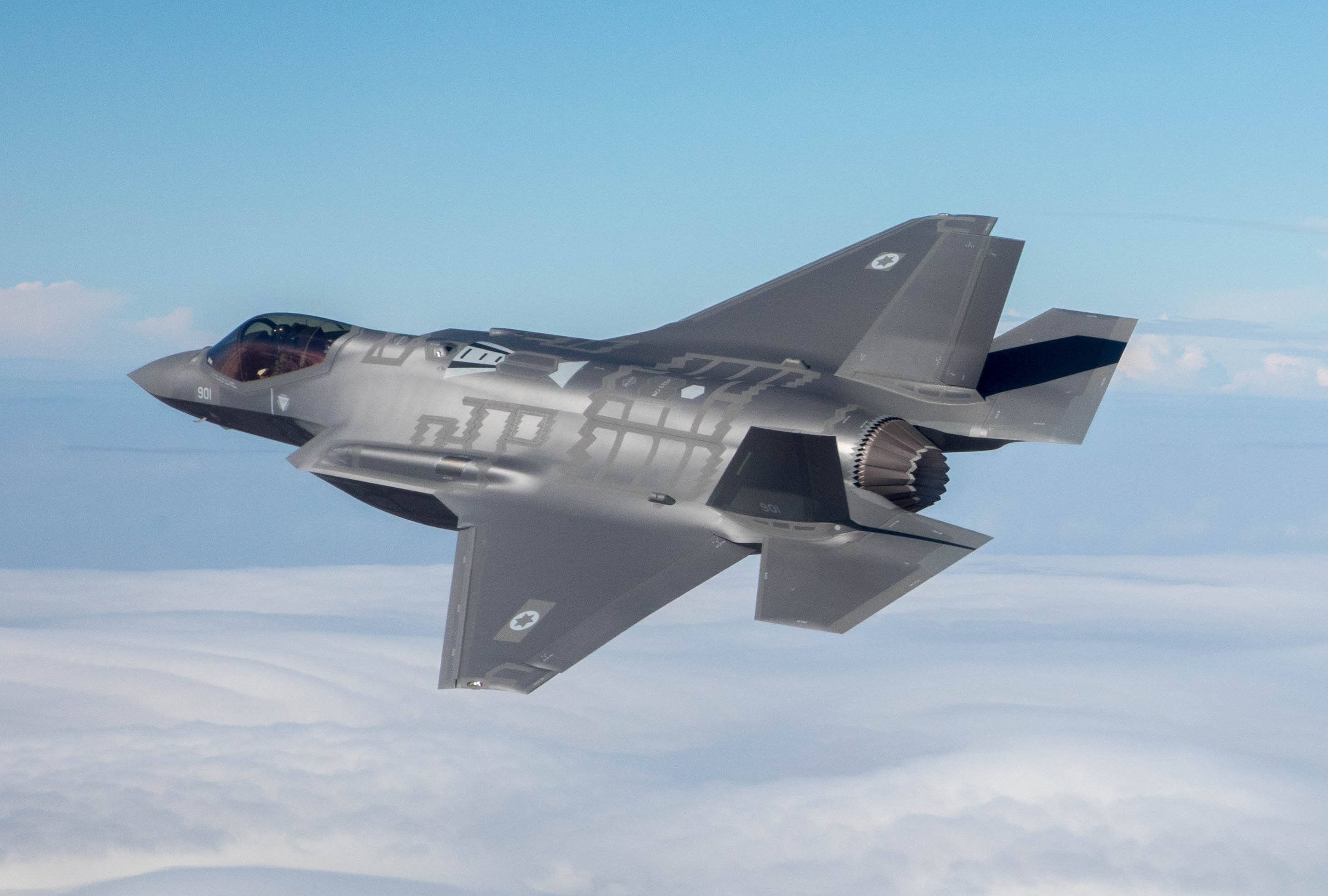
IAF F-35I Adir on its first flight with the Israeli Air Force, 13 December 2016

In June, the first Israeli F-35A was unveiled with Israeli Defense Minister Avigdor Liberman present. The plane was to undergo further testing and actually be delivered in December. At the time it was stated that Israel had ordered 33 F-35s for delivery through 2021, with an option for 17 more. In November the Prime Minister's Office announced Israel was exercising that 17 aircraft option, after a unanimous vote of the Security Cabinet in favor, taking the total number of ordered examples to 50.

On 12 December 2016, Israel received its first shipment of the F-35I Adir. Two Adirs landed in Israel and were received in a ceremony at Nevatim Airbase. The arrival of the F-35I was to make Israel the first country to have an operational F-35 squadron outside of the United States, once the squadron was properly equipped.

2017

On 23 April 2017, the Air Force received another three F-35I fighter jets.

2019

In July, Israel received two more F-35s, bringing the number to 16.

2020

In November, a one-of-a-kind F-35I testbed aircraft was delivered, used to test and integrate Israeli-produced weapons and electronic systems on future F-35's received. This was the only example of a testbed F-35 delivered to an air force outside of the United States.

2021

As of May, 27 aircraft had been delivered. On 26 September, 3 additional F-35s landed at Nevatim Airbase, bringing the total to 30. 2022

On 24 March, 3 additional F-35Is landed in Nevatim Air Base, bringing Israel's total fleet to 33.

In June, F-35I had been able to conduct simulated strikes on Iran without the need for mid-air refueling.

On 12 November, 3 additional F-35Is landed in Israel, earmarked to join the 140 Squadron (Golden Eagle), bringing the country's total fleet to 36.

2023

On 6 January, the U.S. Department of Defense restricted the use of the F-35I Adir fighter by any IAF pilots who have a foreign passport, due to information security concerns.

== Operational timeline ==
2018

On 22 May 2018, Israel's Air Force commander, Major General Amikam Norkin, reported that Israel became the first country in the world to use the F-35 in combat during recent clashes with Iran in Syria.

2021

According to the IDF, on 15 March 2021 F-35Is shot down two Iranian drones, which was the first operational shoot down and interception carried out by an F-35; Ynet reported that 'defense sources' believed the drones were transporting weapons to the Gaza Strip.

On 15 March, Israeli F-35I fighters were scrambled to intercept and destroy two Iranian Shahed-197 drones in regional airspace, scoring the first shot down for the F-35 in the world.

2023

They were also used in the Gaza war. On 23 October 2023 an Israeli F-35I shot down a cruise missile launched toward Israel by the Houthis, scoring the first shoot-down of a missile by F-35 globally.

2024

F-35I fighters were reportedly involved in Israeli airstrikes in Yemen in July 2024, 1,700 kilometers from Israeli territory.

2025

F-35 fighters were used in the Twelve-Day War to strike Iranian targets. It was reported that they were modified with fuel tanks to increase their range.

2026

On 4 March 2026, during the 2026 Iran war, the "Adir" made history, when it shot down a Russian made Iranian Yak-130 fighter. This was the first time stealth fighter has shot down a manned fighter jet in combat.

The Israeli Air Force has been able to keep its F-35 aircraft at combat readiness rates of 90%, while a study by the United States Government Accountability Office showed a decline in combat readiness of American F-35s, dropping from 67% in 2021 to 44% in 2025. The IAF has used the F-35 frequently during recent conflicts, including the 2026 Iran war, and it has used multiple tiers of highly trained IAF staff who maintain the aircraft to defend their homeland and families, while the United States uses contractors who do not have the same existential drive.

== Legacy ==
=== Political impact ===
The F-35 sale has been cited as one reason why there is little public pressure from Israel to stop the 2010 U.S. arms sale to Saudi Arabia.
