= Shimshon Rozen =

Israeli air force officer (1952–2011)

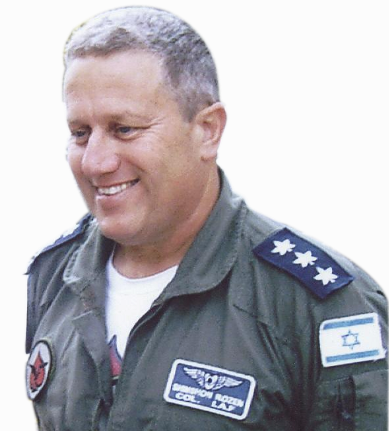
- Shimshon Rozen, 2005
- Native name: שמשון רוזן
- Born: 12 September 1952; Jerusalem, Israel
- Died: 16 December 2011 (aged 59) Modiin, Israel
- Allegiance: Israel
- Branch: Israeli Air Force
- Service years: 1968–2005
- Rank: colonel
- Commands: 151 Squadron "YANAT" (1991-1993), IAF base commander (1993-1995)
- Conflicts: Yom Kippur War 1982 Lebanon War South Lebanon conflict

Shimshon Rozen (Hebrew: שמשון רוזן; 12 September 1952 – 16 December 2011) was an Israeli Air Force weapon systems officer and a colonel in the Israel Defense Forces (IDF). Rozen participated in the Yom Kippur War and 1982 Lebanon War, accumulating hundreds of operational flying hours. Rozen also participated in the IAF's historic flight over the Auschwitz concentration camp.

== Biography ==
Shimshon Rozen was born and raised in the Arnona neighborhood of Jerusalem. He attended Rehavia high school. During the Six-Day War the family home was shelled by the Jordanian army, though the house was empty at the time. On 22 June 1982, Rozen received his Bachelor of Engineering BSc in electrical engineering from Ben-Gurion University. After retiring from the army, Rozen studied for an MBA. He later moved to Timorim.

On 16 December 2011, Rozen died in the crash of a light civilian aircraft in Modi'in-Maccabim-Re'ut. The fatal accident occurred as the plane in which Rozen was flying went into a stall caused by pilot error. Rozen died at the age of 60.

== Military career ==
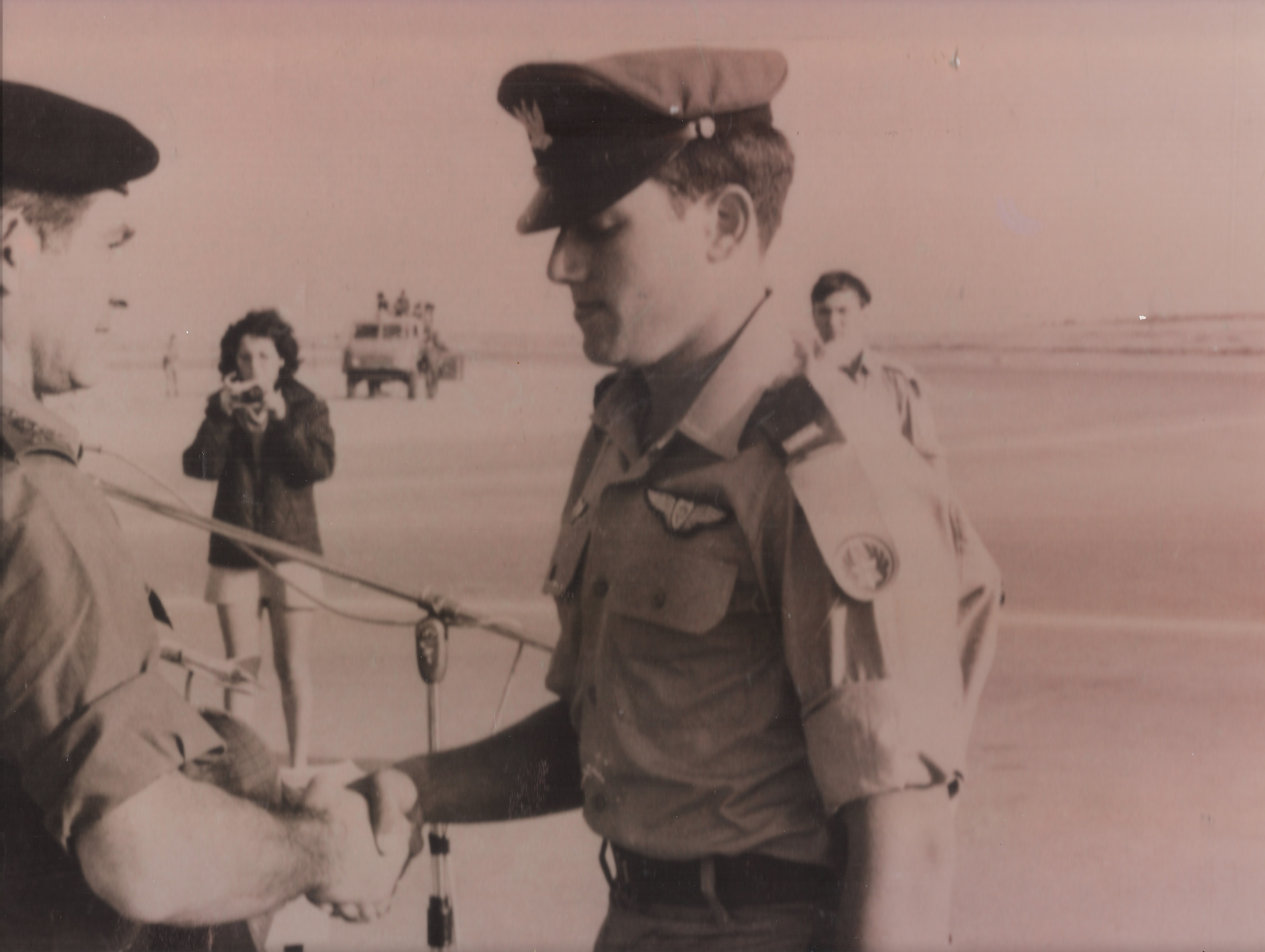
Rozen with IDF Chief of Staff David Elazar during pilot course graduation

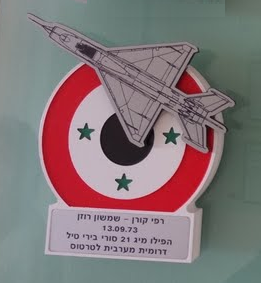
119 squadron plaque commemorating Koren's and Rozen's downing of a Syrian MiG-21

Rozen joined the IDF on 6 October 1970. He attended the Israeli Air Force flight academy, graduating as the outstanding cadet of the fighter-navigation track. After graduation Rozen was assigned to 119 "Bat" Squadron which at that time flew the McDonnell Douglas F-4 Phantom II from Tel Nof Airbase. On his very first operational flight, Rozen and pilot Rafi Koren shot down a Syrian Mikoyan-Gurevich MiG-21.

During the 1973 Yom Kippur War Rozen participated in the 1973 Syrian General Staff Headquarters raid. Rozen flew hundreds of operational missions throughout the war, including attacks on Syrian surface to air missiles (SAM) sites, protection of IDF convoys, and deep penetration strikes against enemy strategic infrastructure.

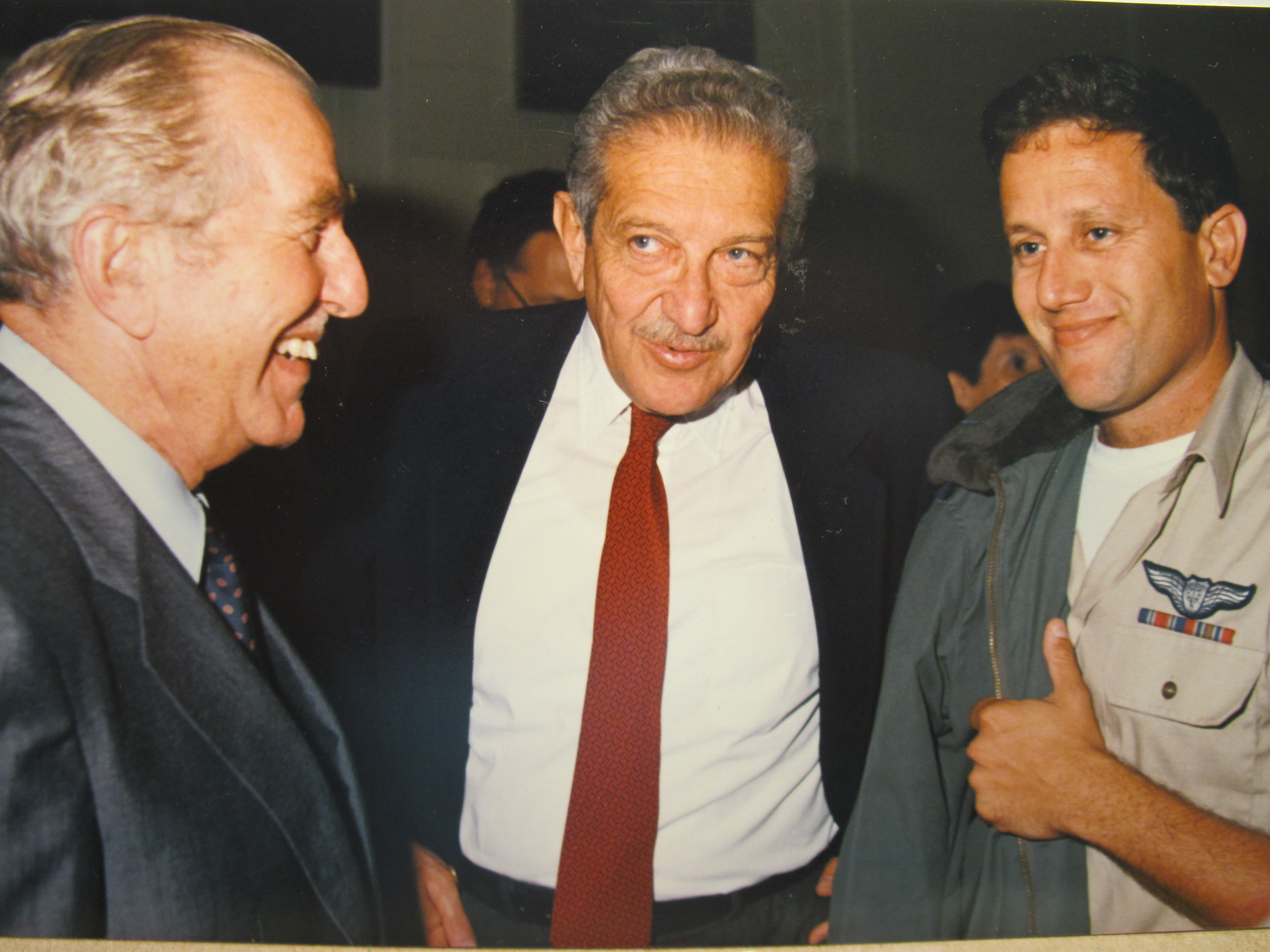
Rozen with former Israeli presidents Chaim Herzog and Ezer Weizman

=== Air Force positions ===
Rozen's positions in the Israeli Air Force include:

- 1973 – Navigator at 119 Squadron (Israel), Leading R&D projects and the unit's navigation division.
- 1982 – Navigator at 601 Squadron (Israel), the IAF's flight test center.
- 1983 – Leading the unit reconnaissance department at 133 Squadron (Israel).
- 1985 – IAF R&D division officer in charge of head-mounted systems for the IAI Lavi.
- 1987 – IAF liaison officer for development of Helmet-mounted displays in California.
- 1991 – 151 "Yanat" Squadron commander.
- 1993 – Israel Air force base commander.

=== Flight over Auschwitz ===
Rozen participated in the historic 4 September 2003 IAF flight over Auschwitz-Birkenau. He later shared this experience with students, holocaust survivors and the general public.

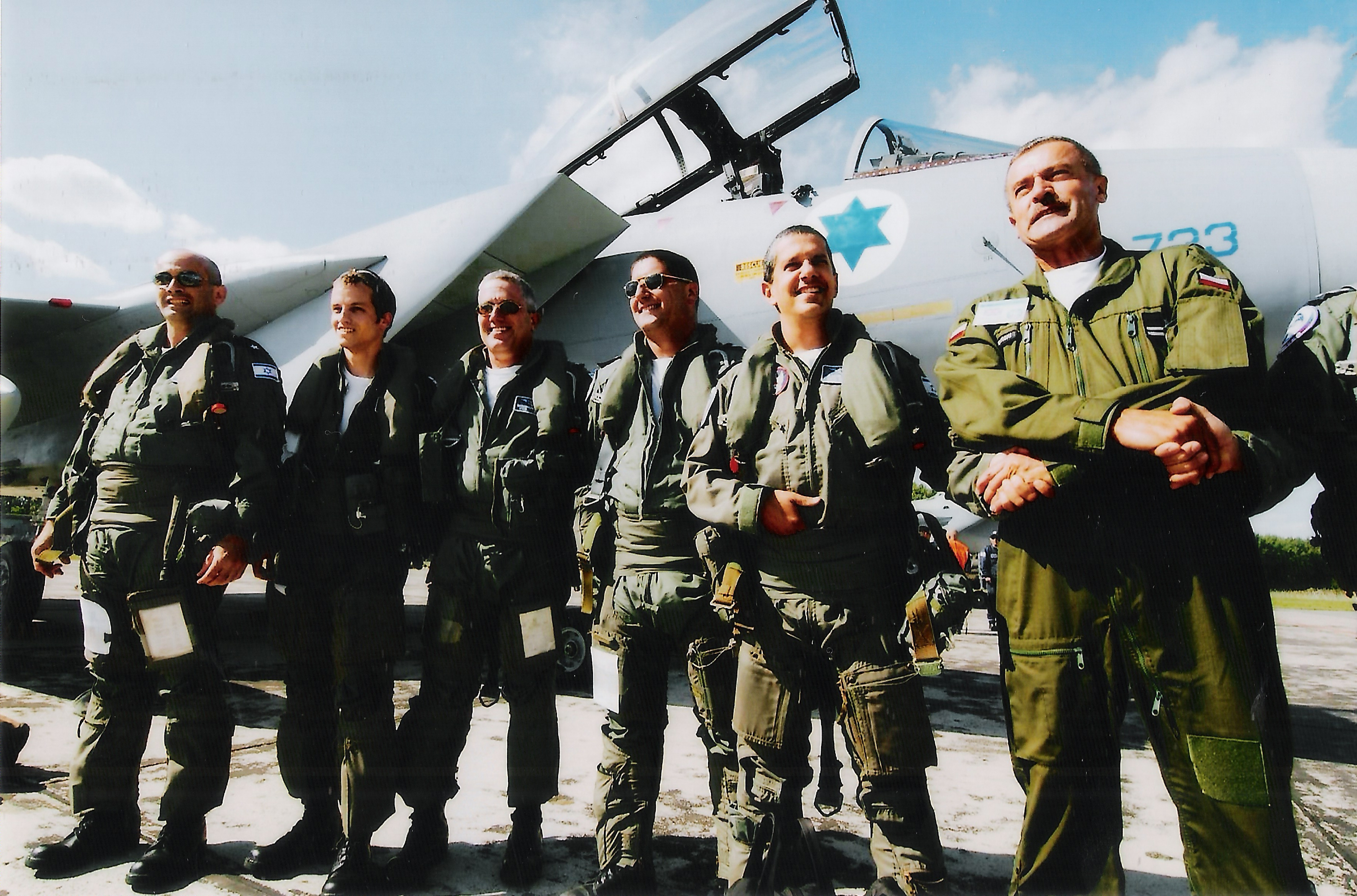
Rozen with Major-General Amir Eshel, Commander of the Israeli Air Force

== Business career and environmental activism ==
After leaving the military, Rozen focused his attention on defense and environmental activism. Rozen held key positions in Israel's leading defense industries including BVR and Elbit Systems' El-Op division. He led and consulted to several startup companies, establishing his own company, SARI.

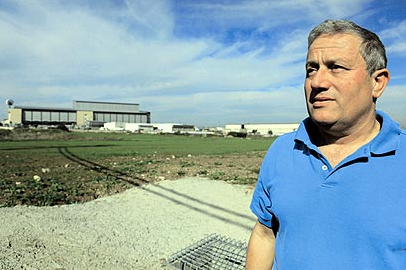
Rozen leading protest against construction of a power station near residential areas in Kiryat Malakhi

Shimshon Rozen led the "Don't kill us" protest activities against the plan to build a power station fueled by natural gas close to residential areas of Kiryat Malakhi. The protest managed to delay the decision to place a power plant near residential areas and shopping malls.

== Commemoration and legacy ==
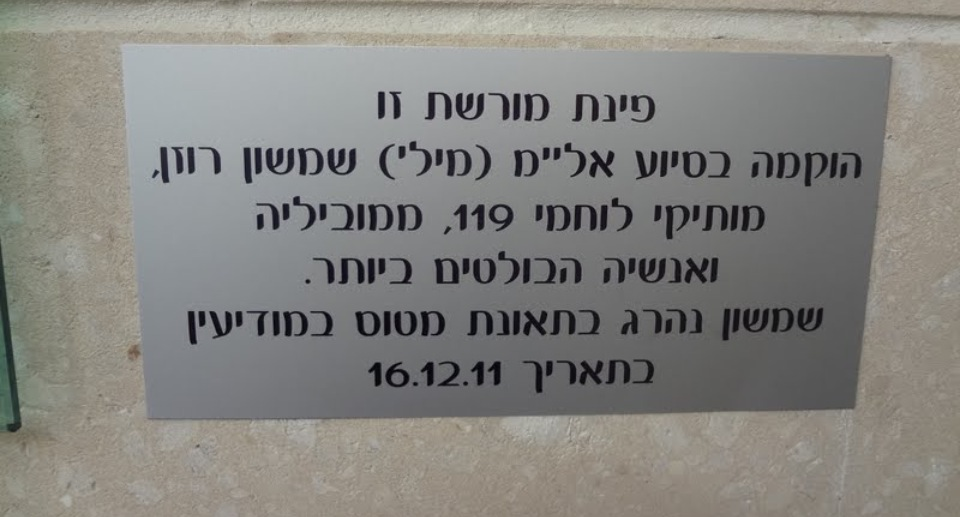
Rozen 119 Squadron memorial plaque

- Dudi Levanon, Rozen's squadron companion and neighbor was quoted as saying at Rozen's funeral: "They asked if Shimshon was my best friend, and without hesitation, I answered yes. On second thought, as I look around, I know many of you feel the same. That was Shimshon – a best friend to everyone here."
- On 4 May 2012, the student council of "Beer Tuvia" high school held an environmental event commemorating Rozen.
- On 12 September 2012, the Israeli Air Force commemorated Rozen's activity in the IAF at an event in Herzliya.
- January 2012 – 119 Squadron dedicated a memorial plaque at Ramon Airbase.
- December 2012 – Be'er Tuvia Regional Council high school mounted a memorial exhibit with an aerial photo of the school and text about Rozen.
- April 2013 – 133 Squadron hung a picture taken by Rozen during his last flight with the IAF.
- January 2014 – A navigation exercise in the memory of Rozen was held at the IDF Bahad school for officers near Mitzpe Ramon.
