= 144 Squadron (Israel) =

Israeli military unit

- טייסת עוף החול
- The Phoenix rises from the ashes
- Active: 1972–2005, 2022–present
- Country: Israel
- Branch: Israeli Air Force
- Role: Air Defence
- Garrison/HQ: Hatzor Airbase
- Nickname: Phoenix Squadron

Aircraft flown
- Spark Nitsot UAV

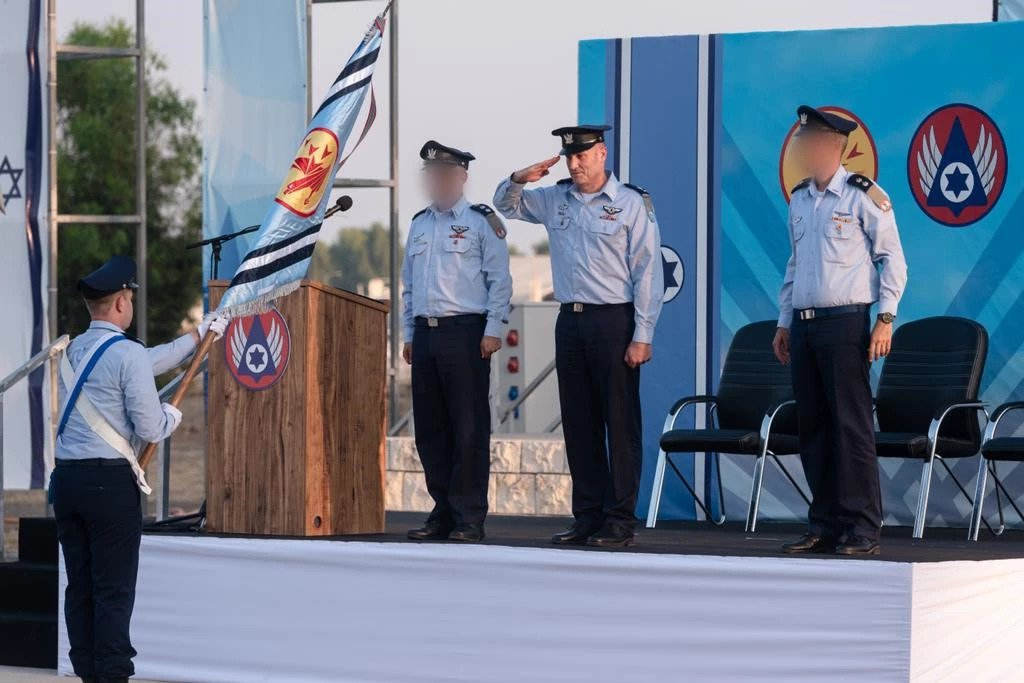
Reopening of 144 Squadron at Hatzor in August 2022

144 Squadron of the Israeli Air Force (IAF), also known as the Phoenix Squadron, operates Spark Nitsot UAVs out of Hatzor Airbase.

== History ==
The squadron was established in 1972 at the Etzion Airbase of the IAF, in the northeast Sinai, not far from the Gulf of Aqaba. The first planes that were taken in by the "Guardians of the Arava" squadron were IAI Nesher planes which was the first fighter plane produced by IAI according to the plans of the French Dassault Mirage 5. The first six planes landed at Etzion on 6 September 1972.

The arrival of 50 Mirage 5 jets was stopped due to an embargo imposed by the French government on arms trade with Israel in 1967. This accelerated the development of the Nesher jet by IAI, to fulfill the operational needs of the IAF. In the Yom Kippur War 1973 the squadron shot down 44 enemy planes, with no own losses and no casualties.

At the beginning of 1982, the construction of the new Ovda Airbase base was completed, a few kilometers from Etzion, in Israeli territory, within the Ovda Valley. This base as well as Ramon Airbase and Nevatim Airbase were built by the United States as compensation for the evacuation of the Sinai for the vast training areas there, and the departure of four airbases: Eitam, Rephidim, Ophira and Etzion.

144 Squadron moved to its new home at Ovda equipped with Kfir C-2 jets, which were a further development of the Nesher jet. In the middle of the 1980s, the improved Kfir C-7 arrived at the "Guardians of the Avara" squadron. In 1988, after major cuts in the military budget, they decided to close the Ovda Airbase as an operational wing and the School of Aviation Professions was transferred to the base.

So 144 Squadron together with 149 Squadron moved to Hatzor Airbase in 1988. There they took the place of two Kfir squadrons that had just been closed, 113 Squadron and 254 Squadron.

The 144 Squadron, which was the last to operate the Kfir, was chosen to be the last F-16A/B Netz squadron also, when in 1994 the jets began to arrive, a gift from the United States for the Israeli peace and security effort and to give up territories in exchange for peace. At the end of 2005 the squadron was closed.

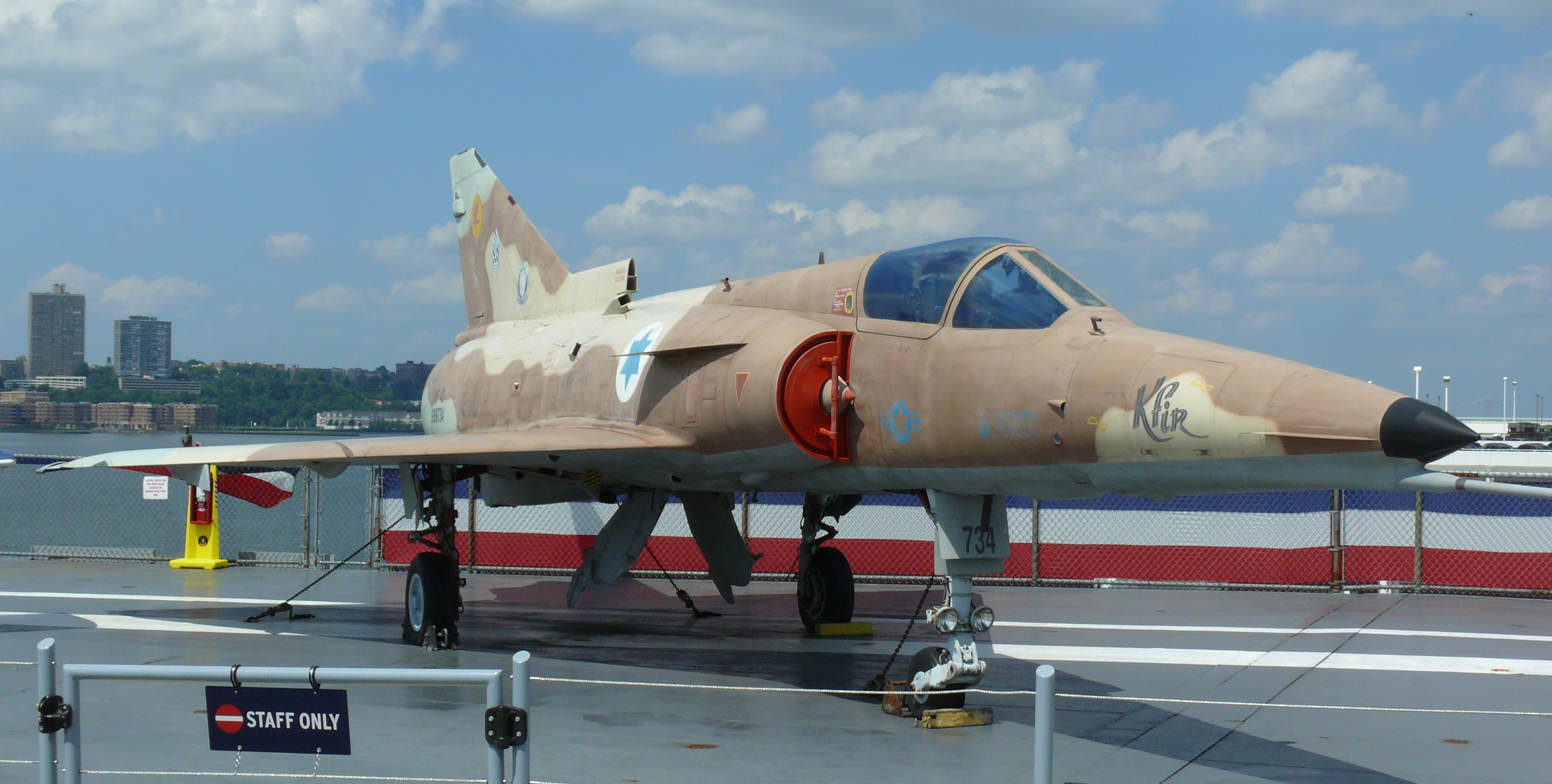
An IAI Kfir of 144 Squadron "Phoenix" in the Intrepid Museum in New York City 2009

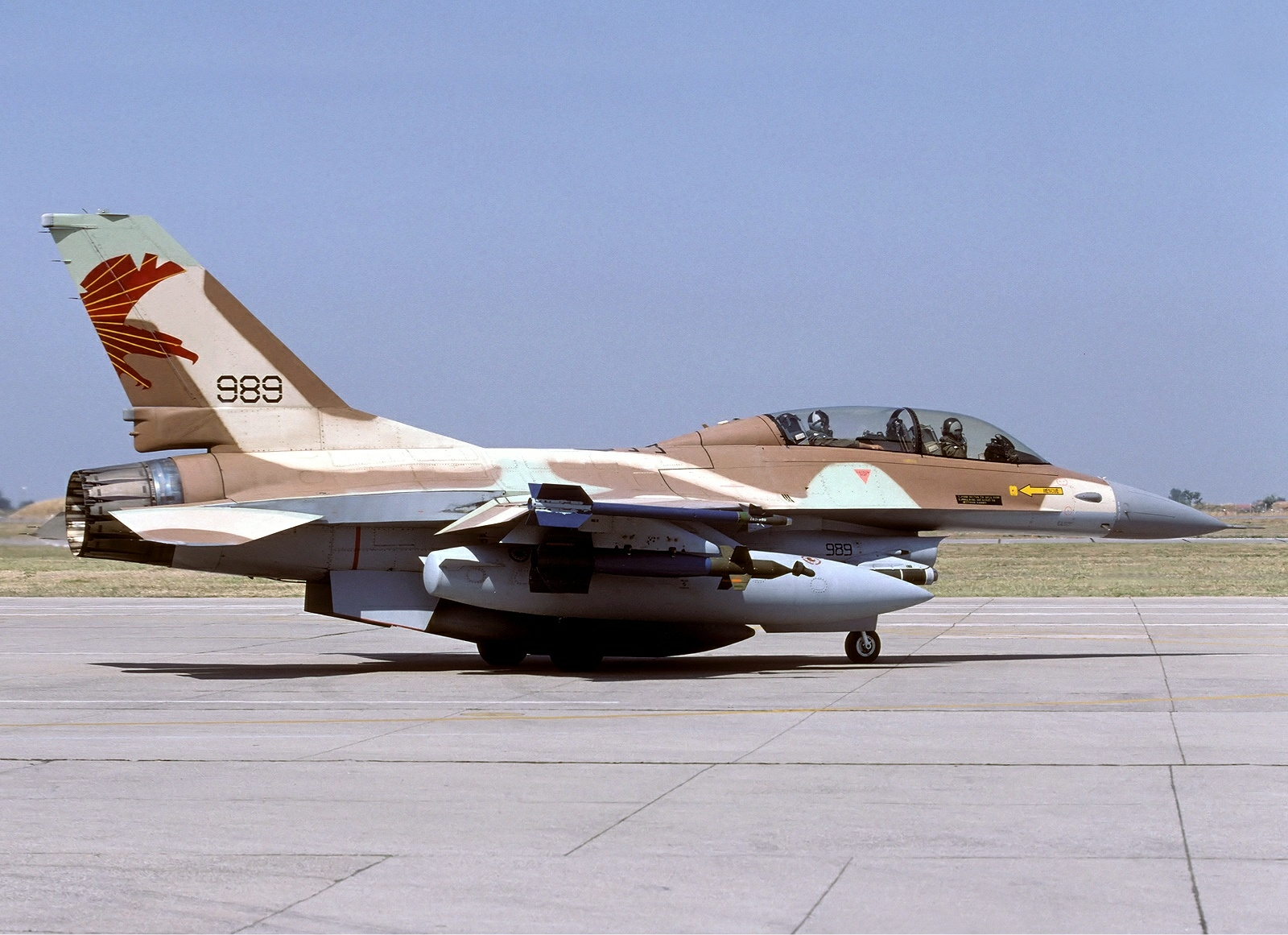
An F-16B Netz of 144 Squadron "Phoenix" at Izmir Air Station in Turkey 2001

== UAV Squadron ==
In August 2022 the squadron was re-opened at Hatzor Airbase as a UAV squadron.

The squadron is the first squadron to operate the Spark Nitzot (Orbiter 4) – as a new UAV in the Air Force and part of the "Storm Clouds" system that will be established in the IDF and is shared by air and ground forces.
