= Ehud Shani =

Israeli general

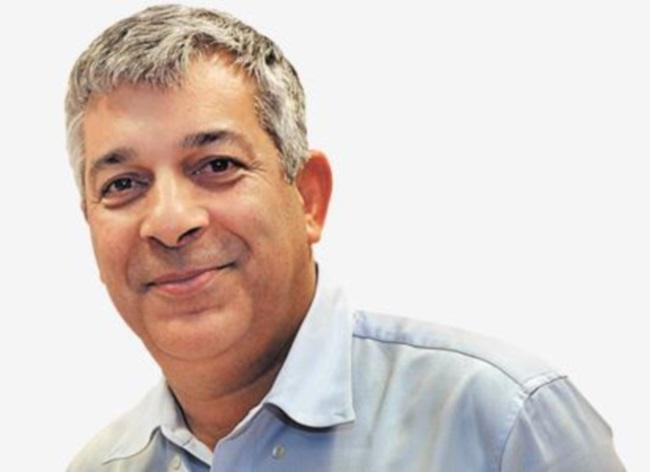
- Native name: אודי שני
- Born: 9 May 1957; Haifa, Israel
- Allegiance: Israel
- Rank: Major general

Ehud Shani (Hebrew: אודי שני; born May 9, 1957) is a general in the Israel Defense Forces and a former Head of C4I and Senior Field Commander.

== Biography ==
Ehud ("Udi") Shani was born in Haifa. He studied at Reali High School. He joined the IDF Armor Corps in 1975 as an enlisted soldier, but the following year he attended Officers School to become an officer. He was the Deputy Commander of an armor battalion during the 1982 Lebanon War.

In 1982 he took a break from his military career to study at Bar-Ilan University, where he received a B.A. in Economics and Social Science. Returning to service, he continued to climb the chain of command.

Shani moved to Fort Monroe, Virginia in 1991 as an Israeli Liaison officer, but returned to Israel in 1994 to become the commander of a tank brigade. He was promoted to Brigadier General in May 2000 when he was appointed the head of the Armor Corps. In December 2003 he was appointed to his current post after serving two years as the head of the "Plada" (steel) Formation, an armored division.
