= 5601 Squadron (Israel) =

Israeli military unit

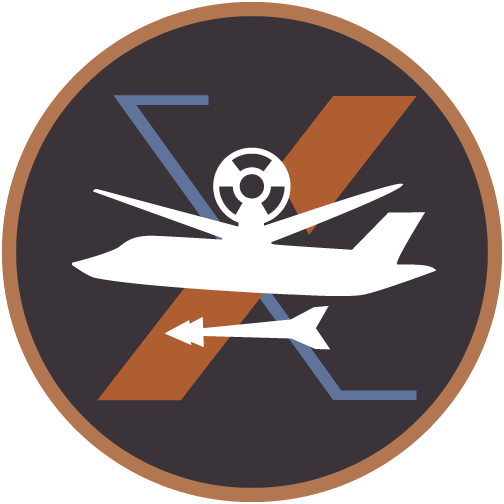
- Active: 1978–present
- Country: Israel
- Branch: Israeli Air Force
- Role: Flight and weapons testing
- Garrison/HQ: Tel Nof Airbase
- Nickname(s): Manat
- Equipment: F-15D Baz; F-15I Ra’am; F-16D Barak; F-16I Sufa; F-35I Adir

5601 Squadron, also known as Manat (Hebrew: מנ"ט, an acronym for Merkaz Nisu'ey Tisa, Hebrew: מרכז ניסויי טיסה, lit. Flight Test Center), is the Israeli Air Force unit responsible for flight and weapons testing, airframe modification and avionics integration. It is based at Tel Nof Airbase.

== History ==
Although formed in 1978, Manat may have its origins in a flight test unit established as early as March 1950. Manat comprises a flight section, including test pilots and flight testing engineers, a technical section charged with aircraft maintenance, an avionics section, and a UAV section operating from Palmachim. The squadron operates a fully instrumented example of every Israeli Air Force frontline combat aircraft type on strength at any time. It operates a number of UAVs and will utilize helicopter and transport types from other squadrons when necessary.

Among the aircraft currently operated by Manat are three F-16 Fighting Falcons, representing the different variants of the aircraft in service: F-16D Block 30 #020, F-16D Block 40 #601 and F-16I Block 52+ #401. F-16D #601, designated CK-1, was designed by Lockheed to meet specific flight test requirements. Another aircraft operated by the squadron is F-15I #201 (94-0286), the very first F-15I built.

Manat has participated in the evaluation of foreign aircraft types, including the Syrian MiG-23 whose pilot defected to Israel in October 1989 and a pair of MiG-29s loaned from a European air force in 1995. During its stay in Israel, one of the MiG-29s even carried the squadron emblem.

The squadron works closely with Israel's defence industries and participates in product testing. Among the projects the squadron was involved with are the various Python missiles, the Popeye II, and the Rafael Spice.

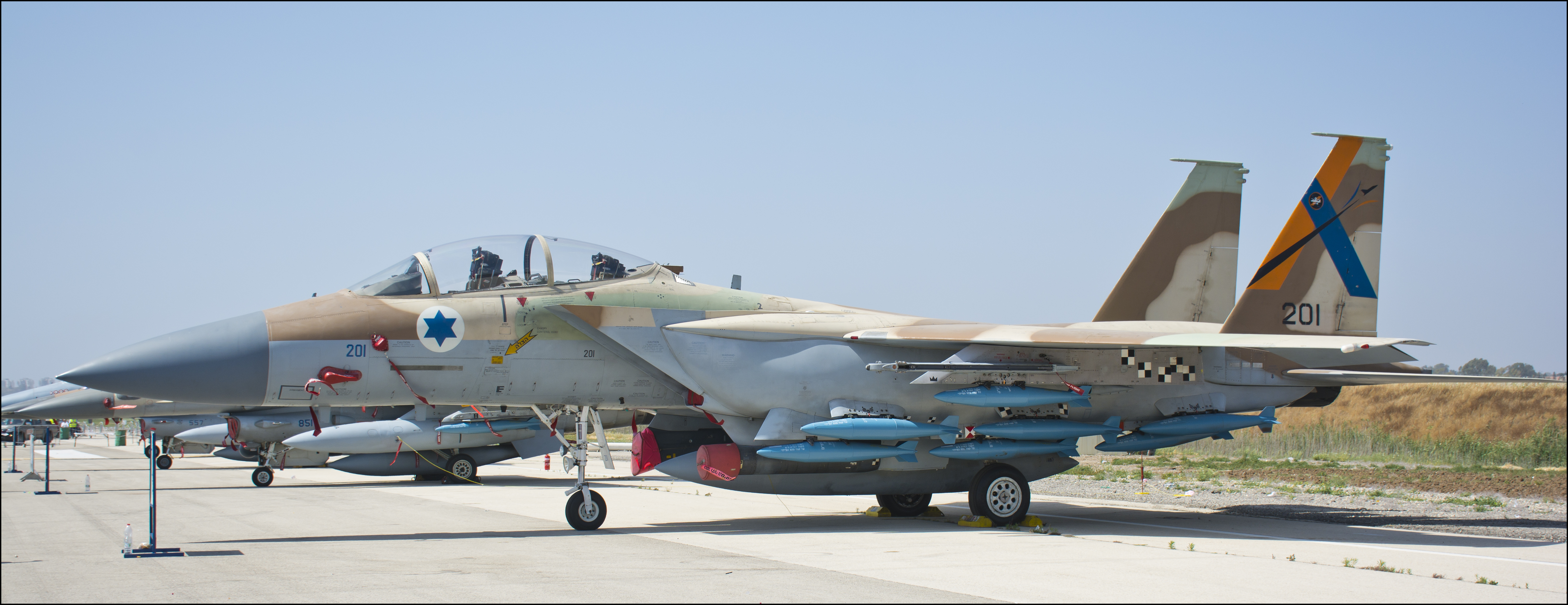
The F-15I Ra'am of the Flight Test Center at Tel Nof Airbase in 2017

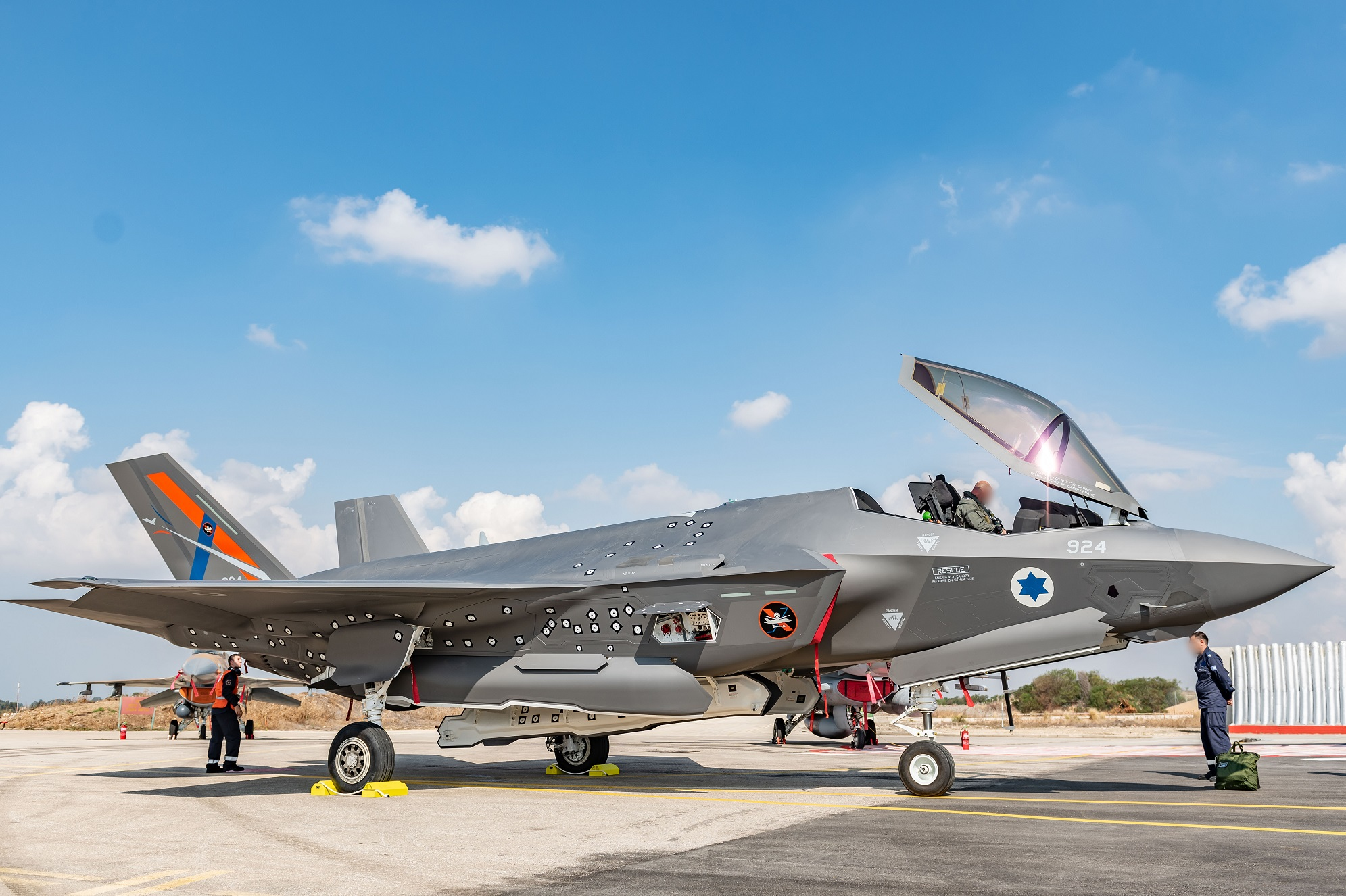
The Tel Nof Flight Test Center gets a special F-35I Adir in 2020

== See also ==
- List of aerospace flight test centres
- Shimshon Rozen
