= Missile Test Unit (Israel) =

Israeli missile test unit

Missile Test Unit 151
- יחידת ניסוי טילים 151
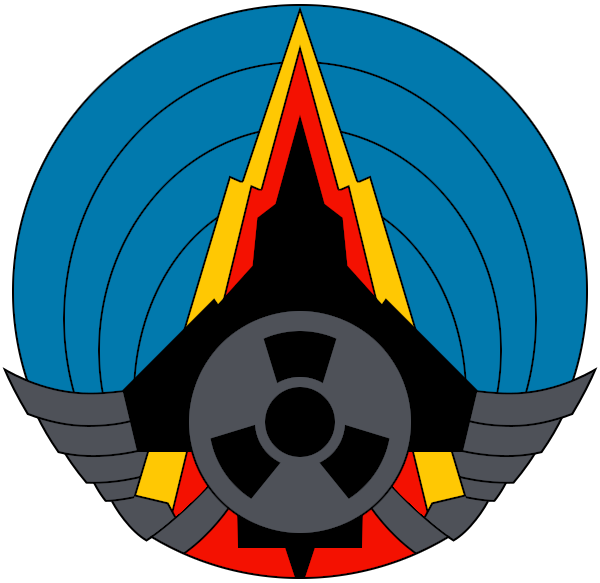
- Active: 1967 - Present
- Country: Israel
- Branch: Israeli Air Force
- Role: Missile testing
- Garrison/HQ: Palmachim Airbase
- Nickname: Yanat
- Mottos: "מכוונים גבוה, מגיעים רחוק" transl. "Aim high, reach far"

Missile Test Unit 151 (יחידת ניסוי טילים) abbreviated as Unit 151 or 151 Squadron, is a unit of the Israeli Air force that performs tests of missiles (such as the Arrow missile system) and other kinds of weapons, including directed-energy systems. They are based at Palmachim Airbase. The unit is also responsible for launching satellites into orbit, including the classified Ofek system.

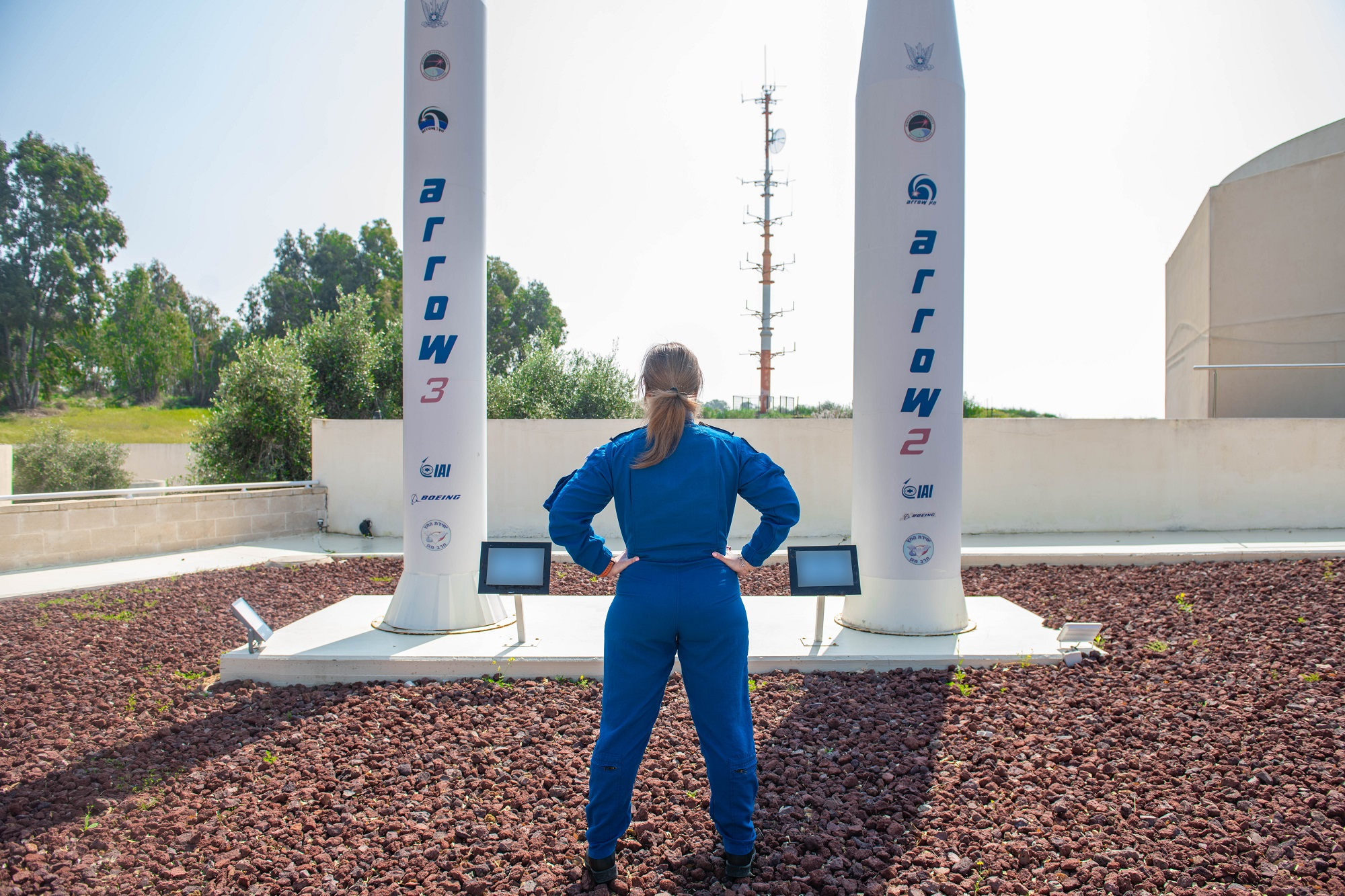
A unit member stands in front of test articles of the Arrow 2 and 3 missiles.

== History ==
In 1969, the unit's test range at what is now the Palmachim Airbase (referred to as "Yanat", also a nickname for the unit itself) was established in the middle of the country. The location was chosen so that rocket launches could travel out across the Mediterranean Sea and avoid the risk of accidentally sparking a conflict with Israel's neighboring countries.

In 1991, Israeli military hero Shimshon Rozen took command of the unit.

In June 2010, the Missile Test Unit participated in the launch of the Ofek 9 spy satellite, which flew to orbit from the unit's base.

Starting in 2016, some functions of the unit were outsourced to private entities.

In June 2021, the unit said that they had successfully shot down drones with a directed-energy weapon.

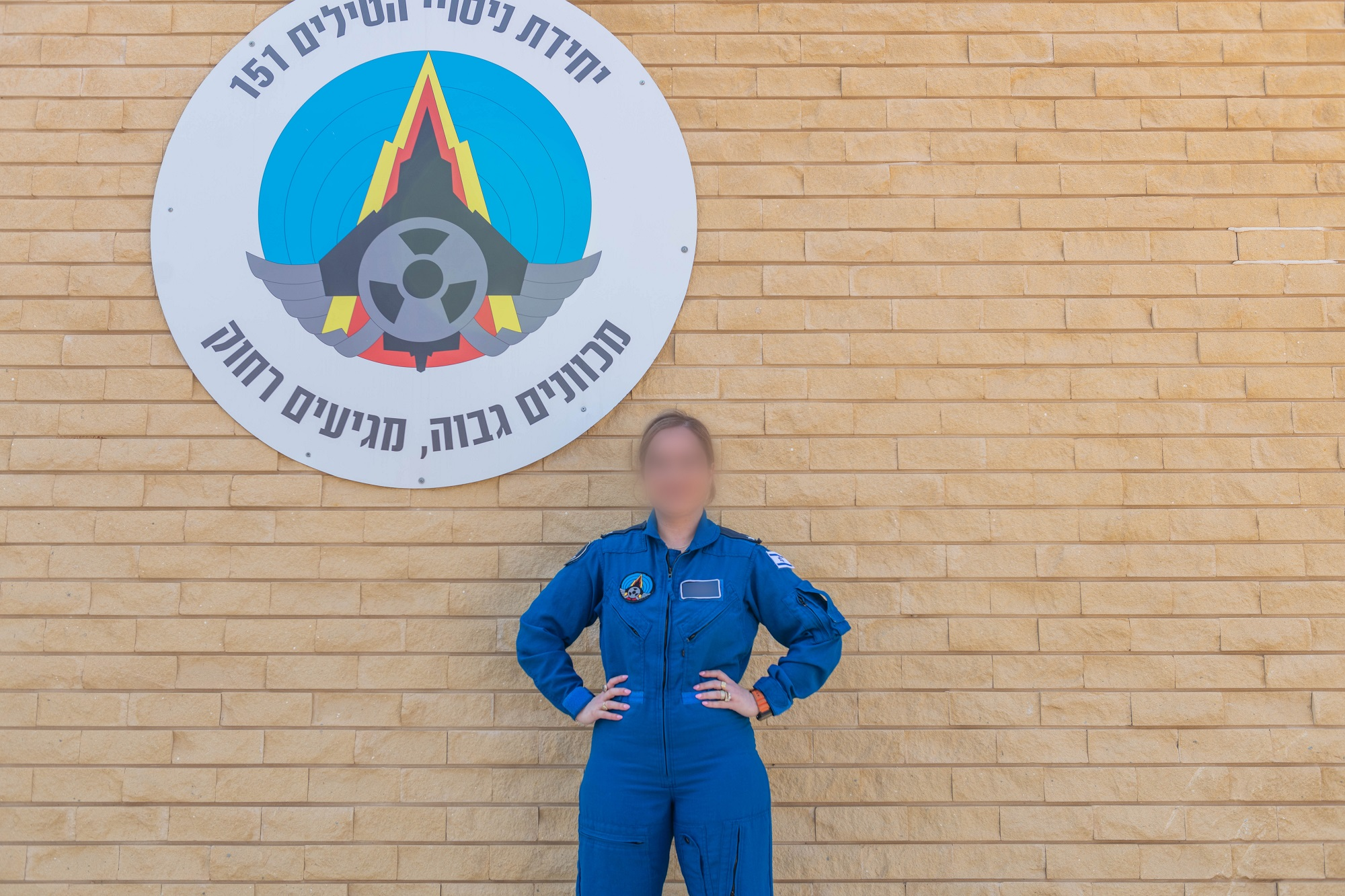
A unit member stands in front of the unit's logo.
