= 133 Squadron (Israel) =

Israeli military unit

133rd Squadron IAF
- טייסת 133
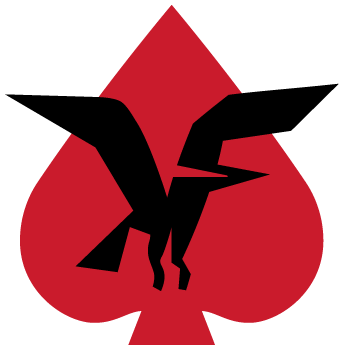
- Squadron Logo
- Active: August 12, 1987 – present
- Country: Israel
- Allegiance: Israel Defense Forces
- Branch: Israeli Air Force
- Type: fighter squadron
- Garrison/HQ: Tel Nof Airbase

Aircraft flown
- Fighter: F-15A/B/C/D

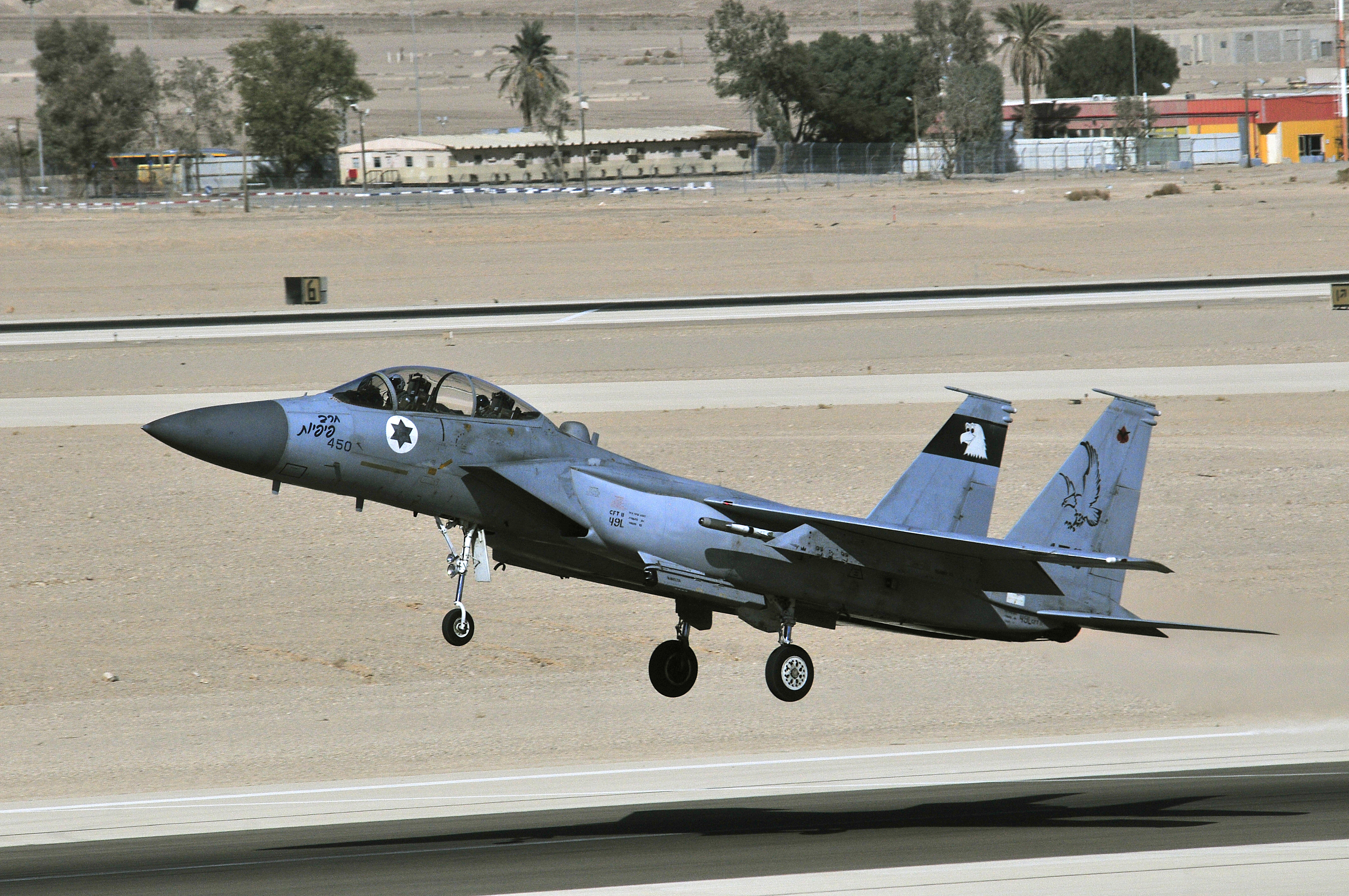
A 133 Squadron F-15 taking off from Ovda airbase

The 133 Squadron of the Israeli Air Force, also known as the Knights of The Twin Tail, is an F-15A/B/D fighter squadron based at Tel Nof Airbase.

== See also ==
- Operation Opera
- Tomer Bar
- Eitan Ben-Eliyahu
- Shimshon Rozen
