= 149 Squadron (Israel) =

Israeli military unit

- טייסת התוכי המנפץ
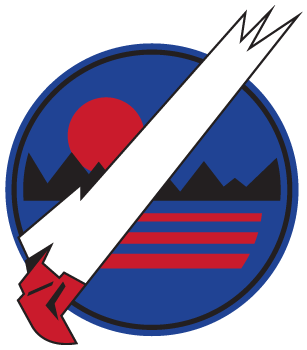
- Active: 1976–1991
- Country: Israel
- Branch: Israeli Air Force
- Role: attack
- Garrison/HQ: Etzion/Ovda/Hatzor
- Nickname: Smashing Parrot

Commanders
- Notable commanders: Israel Parnas

Aircraft flown
- Fighter: A-4 Skyhawk; IAI Kfir

149 Squadron, often referred to as the Smashing or Shattering Parrot (Hebrew: התוכי המנפץ) squadron is a former unit of the Israeli Air Force. Active from 1976 to 1991, the squadron flew the A-4 Skyhawk and IAI Kfir.

== History ==
149 Squadron was activated at Etzion in July 1976, the IAF's eighth and penultimate A-4 squadron. It was initially equipped with the E model of the Skyhawk, made available when 140 Squadron converted to A-4Ns, though by 1978 it was operating N model Skyhawks as well.

From November 1980, while under the command of Lt. Col. Israel Parnas, 149 begun operating the new IAI Kfir C.2 alongside the Skyhawk, and by late 1981 had retired the older type. On May 4, 1981, the squadron lost one its Kfirs during dissimilar air combat training with IAF F-15 Eagles. Its pilot, Major Yoram Eitan, son of IDF Chief of the General Staff Rafael Eitan, was killed. In 1982, with Israel's evacuation of the Sinai following the Camp David Accords, 149 Squadron moved to Ovda. On 19 July 1988, due to IAF downsizing and the need to provide additional civil airport capacity for Eilat, the squadron relocated to Hatzor. As other Kfir units eventually transitioned to the F-16 Fighting Falcon, 149 received additional aircraft and for a time may have been unusually large. It was finally disbanded in 1991, its aircraft stored at Ovda.

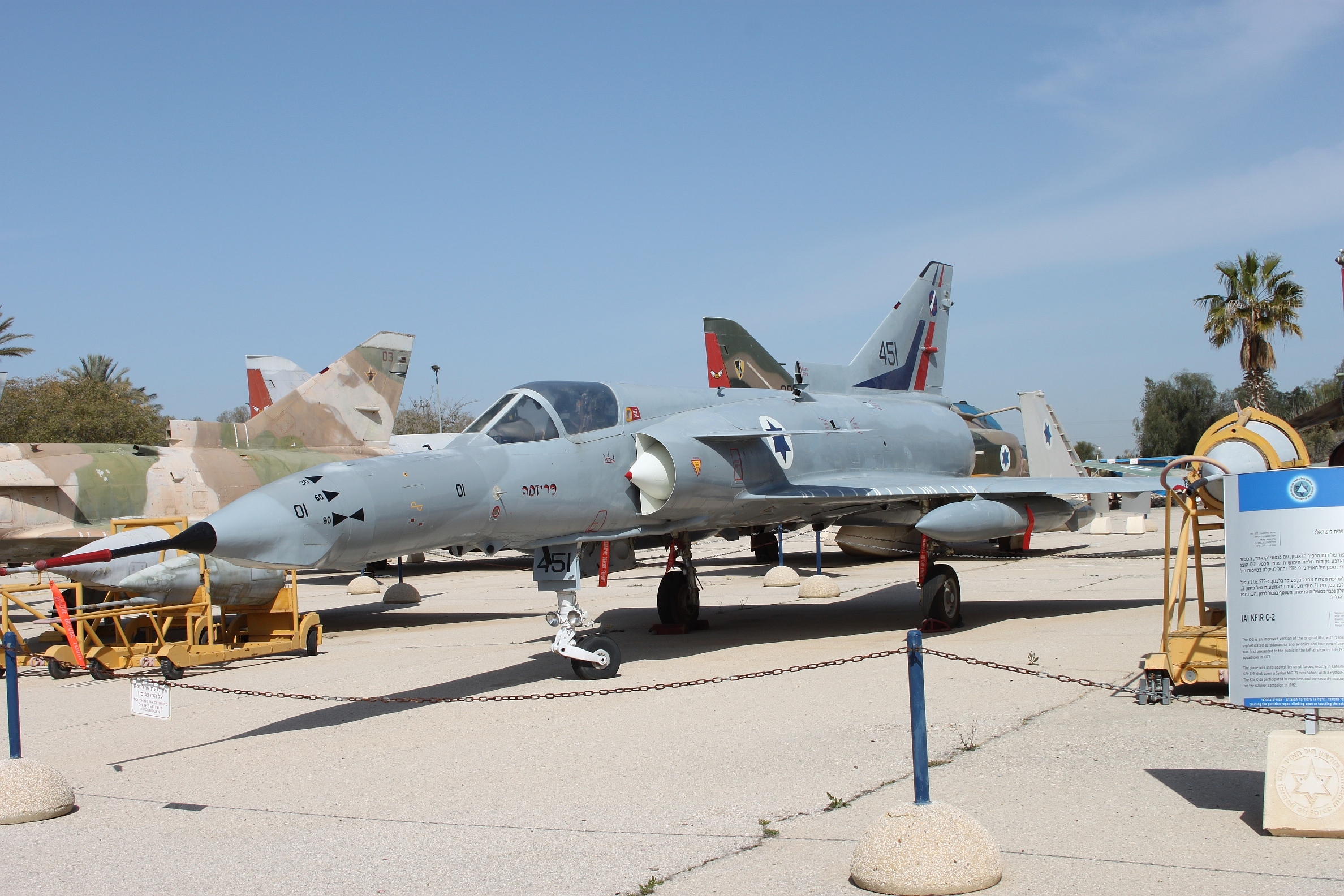
Reconnaissance Kfir 451 "Prism"

149 Squadron was reportedly the IAF's Operational Training Unit for the Kfir, tasked with qualifying new airmen on the type. As such, it also flew the two seat variant of the Kfir, the TC-2. The squadron also operated two Kfirs modified for the reconnaissance role and designated RC-2. The two aircraft, 419 and 451 (initially 819 and 851), were converted to mount camera noses developed for the Dassault Mirage. Their guns were removed, the radar warning receivers were moved aft, a Doppler radar installed under the forward fuselage, and they were installed with additional piping to carry power to the nose. When the squadron disbanded, the two aircraft were transferred to 144 Squadron.

== Markings ==
149 Squadron A-4 Skyhawks bore the IAF's standard 4-tone Skyhawk camouflage scheme, with the black character aircraft code applied on the nose. Unlike other IAF Skyhawk squadrons, it had no distinctive rudder colors. Its Kfirs bore both the 2-tone 'compass gray' scheme and the F-16-style 4-tone scheme. In the late 1980s, its aircraft begun bearing blue and red tail flashes.
