= 135 Squadron (Israel) =

Military unit

135th Squadron IAF
- טייסת 135
- Logo of the Squadron
- Active: August 12, 1987 – present
- Country: Israel
- Allegiance: Israel Defense Forces
- Branch: Israeli Air Force
- Type: Reconnaissance Squadron
- Garrison/HQ: Sde Dov Airport
- Nickname(s): Air Kings

Aircraft flown
- Reconnaissance: Beechcraft Super King Air 200; Beechcraft A36 Bonanza

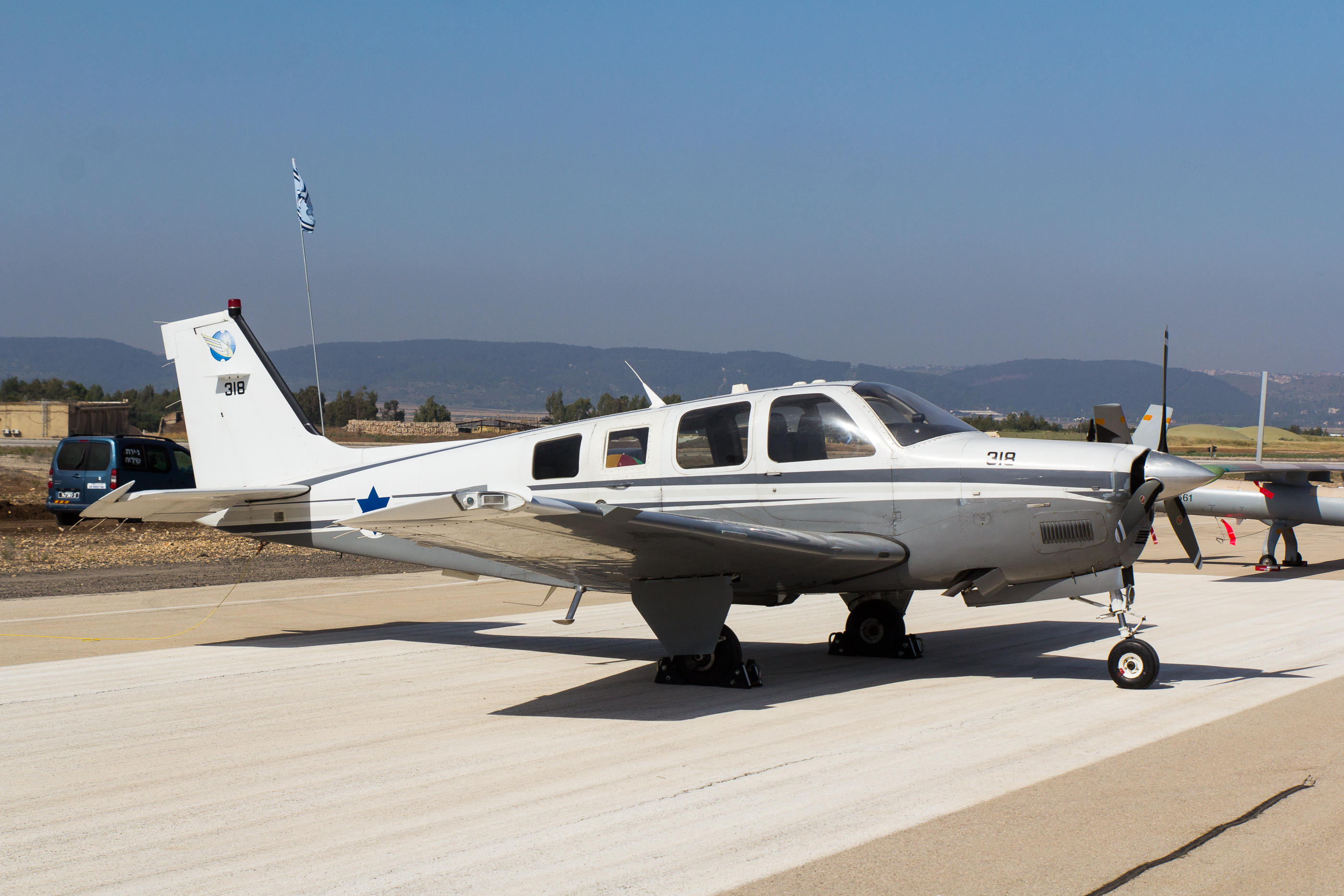
Bonanza A36 ("Khofit") plane of this squadron

The 135 Squadron of the Israeli Air Force, also known as the Air Kings Squadron.

This squadron operates a Beechcraft Super King Air 200 ("Tzofit" and "Kokiya") and Beechcraft A36 Bonanza ("Khofit"). The squadron is based at Sde Dov Airport.

== History ==
The squadron was established on May 1, 1974, and was called the "Light Transport Squadron". Since then the squadron has carried out many missions, in which it transports commanders and officers in Israel and abroad, relay missions, electronic warfare and intelligence gathering, as well as many training missions, in which she flies navigators during the pilot course at the flight school and trains pilots from all the corps on its three types of aircraft.

Its establishment was done in a quick process, and without many bureaucratic obstacles, as part of learning the lessons after the Yom Kippur War. The Air Force Commander at the time, Major General Benny Peled, decided that the Air Force needed a squadron that could perform transport missions in all conditions. In addition, the SDF increased in the flying camel squadron (100 squadron), and it was decided to split it up, and assign the transport and patrol missions to the air kings squadron. The crane and sparrow aircraft remained in the flying camel squadron, while the Cessna and Islander aircraft were transferred to the "light transport" squadron. About half a year after the end Yom Kippur War. A couple of pilots were sent to the United States and were converted on the Zamir (80-B Queen Air) plane.

During Operation Litany, in 1978, the squadron performed 88 reconnaissance sorties and 35 transport sorties. During the peace negotiations with Egypt, the squadron made transport flights for members of the negotiation team on Zamir planes to Cairo and Alexandria.

On July 30, 1982, the squadron's missions were redefined following the intention to purchase Beechcraft RC-12D "Guardrail" aircraft for intelligence missions. The new planes were absorbed into the squadron in November 1984 and were given the Hebrew nickname "Cuckoo". Since 1985, the squadron has been performing operational missions using the Cuckoo. Over the years the squadron received many new aircraft; In 1995, the Cessna was replaced by the Pashush aircraft (TB-20 Trined), and in 2002 the Nightingale was replaced by the Scout aircraft.

The Peshosh was replaced by the Coastal in 2004, and was used by the squadron until its closure in 2018.

Throughout the years of its activities, the squadron has flown many and varied types of aircraft, demonstrated impressive achievements, such as the squadron that performed the greatest number of flight hours in the force. While most of the squadrons are engaged in training, the Air Kings squadron carried out operational activity for the benefit of the current state security, in all sectors.

In 2004, the squadron appealed to the general public to propose a new name, and within a few months it adopted its current name "Kings of the Air Squadron", which indeed represented it in an appropriate way, thanks to its planes produced by the company "King Air" (which translates in Hebrew as "King of the Air"), and thanks to its holding the flight hours record for many years.

The technical branch of the squadron, which was responsible for maintaining the planes and preparing them for sorties, was also shared with Squadron 100 ("the Flying Camel Squadron").

The squadron was closed in December 2018 and merged back into Squadron 100.
