= 254 Squadron (Israel) =

Israeli military unit

- טייסת מרכז המדינה
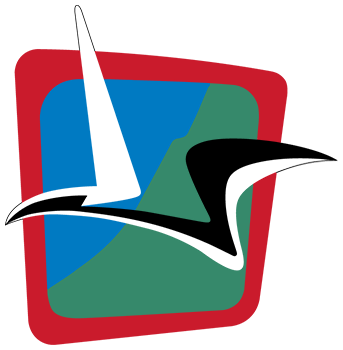
- squadron patch
- Active: 1980–1984
- Country: Israel
- Branch: Israeli Air Force
- Role: fighter
- Garrison/HQ: Hatzor
- Nickname(s): Midland Squadron

Commanders
- Notable commanders: Giora Epstein

Aircraft flown
- Fighter: Dassault Mirage III; IAI Kfir

254 Squadron, also known as the Midland Squadron (Hebrew: טייסת מרכז המדינה), is a former unit of the Israeli Air Force.

== History ==
254 Squadron was formed in April 1980 at Hatzor to operate the IAI Kfir C-1. These had served with 109 Squadron which had begun to equip with the C-2 variant. Manned mainly by reserve pilots, 254 Squadron was commanded by Lieutenant Colonel Giora Epstein, Israel's highest scoring fighter ace, and a reserve pilot himself.

A year later the squadron received an additional aircraft type, the Dassault Mirage III. The Mirage had once stood at the vanguard of the Israeli Air Force, claiming over 280 aerial victories to its name. By the late 1970s, however, these veteran French aircraft were superseded by the IAF's next generation of fighter aircraft, the American F-15 Eagle and F-16 Fighting Falcon. The first squadron to re-equip with the Falcon, 117 Squadron, had in 1979 transferred its former mounts to 253 Squadron at Eitam, and the latter was soon slated to receive the Falcon as well. Coinciding with Israel's withdrawal from the Sinai Peninsula following the Camp David Accords, and in order to continue operating the Mirages pending their sale to Argentina, when 253 left Eitam for Ramon in late 1981, the remaining 22 Mirages made their way to Hatzor to join 254 Squadron.

254 Squadron was operating both types when the 1982 Lebanon War broke out, during which the Mirages continued flying combat air patrols. On at least one occasion they were even vectored towards enemy aircraft, but these were soon dispatched by F-15s also on the scene. They were soon thereafter retired. In 1984, as more Kfir C-2s were rolling off the production line, the Kfir C-1s were leased to the US military and 254 Squadron was deactivated.

== Markings ==
The 254 Squadron badge was a stylized bird over the outline of Israel's coastline. Its Kfirs wore the standard four-tone camouflague used by all IAF delta-winged fighters at the time, though usually without the black identifications triangles common on the Mirages and IAI Neshers. They also carried serials in the 700 range, which were applied on the tail and nose gear.

While with 253 Squadron, the Mirages had received blue rudders with two white chevrons separated by a black band. At the end of their tenure with the squadron some aircraft were seen with the top chevron changed to red. When the Mirages joined 254 Squadron, not only were the different rudders maintained, but both were applied to the Kfirs as well. The different markings may have been an attempt at disinformation, meant to mislead uninformed observers.
