= Ofek-16 =

Israeli reconnaissance satellite

- Names: Ofeq-16
- Mission type: Optical reconnaissance
- Operator: Israeli Ministry of Defence / Israel Defense Forces
- COSPAR ID: 2020-056A
- SATCAT no.: 41759
- Mission duration: 5 years (planned); 5 years, 10 months and 26 days (in progress)

Spacecraft properties
- Spacecraft: Ofeq-16
- Bus: OPSAT-3000
- Manufacturer: Israel Aerospace Industries
- Launch mass: 370 kg (820 lb)

Start of mission
- Launch date: 6 July 2020, 01:00 UTC
- Rocket: Shavit 2 (No.11)
- Launch site: Palmachim Air Base
- Contractor: Israel Aerospace Industries
- Entered service: July 2020

Orbital parameters
- Reference system: Geocentric orbit
- Regime: Retrograde low Earth orbit
- Perigee altitude: 341 km (212 mi)
- Apogee altitude: 594 km (369 mi)
- Inclination: 142.53°
- Period: 94.0 minutes

Ofek-16, also known as Ofeq-16, is an Israeli electro-optical reconnaissance satellite launched in July 2020. It is part of the Ofeq family, designed and built by Israel Aerospace Industries (IAI) for the Israeli Ministry of Defence.

The Space Administration in the Ministry of Defence has led the development and production of the satellite and its launcher. IAI is the main contractor. Its Systems, Missiles and Space Group led the program, together with the MLM Division, which is responsible for the development of the launcher. Elbit Systems developed and produced the satellite's camera and payload. The launch engines were developed by Rafael and Tomer, a government-owned weapons technology company.

Among other companies participating in the program are BAE Systems Rokar and Cielo Inertial Solutions, who provided navigation systems and for "satellite full autonomy". Israel Defence Forces officials, primarily from the Intelligence Corps and Air Force, have also been deeply involved in the satellite development process.

== Launch ==
Ofek-16 was launched on 6 July 2020 at 04:00 local time (01:00 UTC) from Palmachim Airbase in central Israel by a Shavit 2 launch vehicle, and deployed into low Earth orbit. Shortly after launch, Ofek-16 began orbiting Earth and transmitting data.

Ofek-16 is equipped with an improved version of "Jupiter Space" camera of Elbit Systems, compared to the one present on the OPTSAT-3000 satellite. It has "high spectral resolution" of up to 50 centimetres from a height of 600 kilometres. It can photograph 15 square kilometres in a single shot. With Ofek-16, Israel can observe the whole Middle East and other regions with great precision.

No notice was made public ahead of launch. The first announcement came from the Ministry of Defence via Twitter, about an hour and a half after liftoff, confirming that Ofek-16 had been deployed successfully into orbit. Although many details of the spacecraft and its planned operations have been kept secret, the Israeli government has been upfront about the military nature of the mission – with the launch announcement confirming its role as a reconnaissance satellite and a later one identifying it as an "electro-optical reconnaissance satellite with advanced capabilities". Images and videos have since been released showing the spacecraft and its launch vehicle being prepared for launch.

The Research and Development for the launch vehicle was a mutual effort of Israel Defense Ministry and the Israeli Aerospace Industries. The Ministry of Defence said that "[its] and IAI engineers have started a series of pre-planned tests to determine the performance level of the satellite before it begins its full operational activities". Once it is deemed fully operational, the Ministry will hand over its responsibilities to the Israel Defence Forces '9900' Intelligence Unit.

== Mission ==
Following the launch, the first images were expected to be received in about a week. On 14 July 2020, the Defence Ministry spokesperson communicated that a week after launch, Defence Ministry and IAI engineering teams have operated the satellite's observation camera for the first time. The images were received overnight at an IAI control station in Yehud, central Israel. The Defence Ministry did not release copies of these initial photographs. They are currently being stored at the control station. "The images we received from the satellite are of excellent quality", said Amnon Harari, head of the Space and Satellite Administration in the Ministry of Defence. He added that "the orderly process of transferring the satellite to operational use" was to be continued.

Defence Minister Benny Gantz spoke of "another extraordinary achievement for the defence apparatus".

Israel is not known to have attempted any satellite launches between Ofek-11 and -16. It is not clear whether the "Ofek-12" through -15 designations have been skipped, or applied to other spacecraft.

Israel has been building up its surveillance capabilities to monitor enemies such as Iran. The launch was set in a geopolitical situation, when Israel considers Iran to be its greatest threat, citing its development of long-range missiles, its military presence in neighboring Syria and its nuclear program, which it sees as a major threat.
