= Ofeq-11 =

Israeli reconnaissance satellite

- Names: Ofek-11
- Mission type: Optical reconnaissance
- Operator: Israeli Ministry of Defence / Tsahal
- COSPAR ID: 2016-056A
- SATCAT no.: 41759
- Mission duration: 5 years (planned); 7 years, 8 months and 27 days

Spacecraft properties
- Spacecraft: Ofeq-11
- Bus: OPSAT-3000
- Manufacturer: Israel Aerospace Industries
- Launch mass: 370 kg (820 lb)

Start of mission
- Launch date: 13 September 2016, 14:38 UTC
- Rocket: Shavit 2 (No.10)
- Launch site: Palmachim Air Base
- Contractor: Israel Aerospace Industries

End of mission
- Decay date: 9 June 2024

Orbital parameters
- Reference system: Geocentric orbit
- Regime: Low Earth orbit
- Perigee altitude: 341 km (212 mi)
- Apogee altitude: 594 km (369 mi)
- Inclination: 142.53°
- Period: 94.0 minutes

Ofeq-11, also known as Ofek 11 (Horizon in Hebrew), is part of the Ofeq family of reconnaissance satellites designed and built by Israel Aerospace Industries (IAI) for the Israeli Ministry of Defense.

== Launch ==
Ofek-11 was launched on 13 September 2016, at 14:38 UTC from the Palmachim Airbase in Israel, two years after the launch of Ofeq-10. It was delivered using IAI's Shavit 2 launcher. Compared to its predecessor, the new satellite features an improved version of El-Op's "Jupiter High-Resolution Imaging System", with resolution increased to 0.5 meter, and uses a new satellite bus - OPSAT-3000 - which is a derivative of the satellite bus used in TecSAR-1.

== Mission ==
According to reports, the launch initially looked like a success, but about 90 minutes later, engineers realized that while the satellite had entered orbit, not all systems were functioning or responding to instructions. However, after several days of remote repairs, the satellite was operational and taking high-quality pictures. It has been reported that South Korea is considering utilizing the satellite to obtain reconnaissance on North Korean activities.
