= Top Guns =

Top Guns may refer to:

== Literature ==
- "Top Guns", a 1983 article in California by Ehud Yonay which inspired the Top Gun franchise
- Top Guns, a book by Joe Foss and Matthew Brennan
- Top Guns, a 1996 book by Hugh McManners

== Entertainment ==
- Top Guns, a TV series spinoff of Top Shot
- Top Guns: The Next Generation, a TV series on National Geographic
- "Top Guns", an episode of 1988 TV series Wings

== Sports ==
- San Diego Top Guns, a defunct team in the United States Interregional Soccer League
- Minot Top Guns, a defunct team in the Saskatchewan Junior Hockey League

== See also ==
- Top Gun (disambiguation)
