= Ofeq-13 =

Israeli observation satellite

Ofeq 13
- Mission type: Radar reconnaissance
- Operator: Israeli Ministry of Defence / Israel Defense Forces - Unit 9900
- COSPAR ID: 2023-044A
- SATCAT no.: 56083

Spacecraft properties
- Manufacturer: Israel Aerospace Industries
- Dry mass: 350 kg

Start of mission
- Launch date: March 28, 2023, 23:10:00 UTC
- Rocket: Shavit 2
- Launch site: Palmachim Air Base
- Contractor: Israel Aerospace Industries

Orbital parameters
- Period: Around 90 minutes

Ofeq-13, also known as Ofek-13, is an Israeli synthetic-aperture radar observation satellite. It is part of the Ofeq intelligence satellite family, designed and built by Israel Aerospace Industries (IAI) for the Israeli Ministry of Defence and IDF, and is operated by Unit 9900.

== Launch ==
Ofeq-13 was launched on 29 March 2023, 02:10 IST (28 March, 23:10 UTC) from the Palmachim Airbase in Israel. It was delivered using a Shavit 2 launcher. Ofeq-13 was launched westward in a retrograde orbit.
