= Ofeq-10 =

Israeli reconnaissance satellite

- Names: Ofek-10; TecSAR-2; TechSAR-2
- Mission type: Radar reconnaissance
- Operator: Israeli Ministry of Defence / Tsahal
- COSPAR ID: 2014-019A
- SATCAT no.: 39650
- Mission duration: 4 years (planned); 10 years, 11 months and 17 days (in progress)

Spacecraft properties
- Spacecraft: TecSAR-2
- Bus: OPSAT-3000
- Manufacturer: Israel Aerospace Industries
- Launch mass: 400 kg (880 lb)

Start of mission
- Launch date: 9 April 2014, 19:06:02 UTC
- Rocket: Shavit 2 (No.9)
- Launch site: Palmachim Air Base
- Contractor: Israel Aerospace Industries

Orbital parameters
- Reference system: Geocentric orbit
- Regime: Low Earth orbit
- Perigee altitude: 384 km (239 mi)
- Apogee altitude: 609 km (378 mi)
- Inclination: 140.95°
- Period: 94.00 minutes

Ofeq-10, also known as Ofek-10 (Horizon in Hebrew), is part of the Ofeq family of reconnaissance satellites designed and built by Israel Aerospace Industries (IAI) for the Israeli Ministry of Defense.

== Satellite description ==
Ofek-10 is an upgraded variant of Ofeq-8, which employs a high-resolution synthetic-aperture radar (SAR) that is capable of observation at night and through clouds. The satellite's price was US$300 million. The satellite weighs 400 kg.

== Launch ==
Ofeq-10 was launched on 9 April 2014, at 19:06:02 UTC from the Palmachim Airbase in Israel, four years after Ofeq-9's launch. It was delivered using a Shavit launcher. Ofeq-10 was launched westward in a retrograde orbit.
