= David M. Tait =

Scottish businessman (born 1947)

David Martin Tait OBE (born September 29, 1947) is a Scottish-born commercial airline executive, brand/marketing consultant, Washington Post best-selling author and syndicated travel columnist. Best known for his work as one of the architects of the Virgin Atlantic Airways business plan, he was one of the nascent company's first employees. During his career, Tait has served in senior executive and advisory positions for a number of airlines and travel-related companies. He is co-founder of online training company Autism Double-Checked and in September 2023 also co-founded BermudAir, Bermuda’s first island-based schedule carrier.

== Biography ==
David Tait was born in Glasgow, Scotland, the son of William Tait, a textile industry executive and Margaret Tait. He was educated at the Carolside Primary School in Clarkston, East Renfrewshire, until age 11 when his family moved to Yorkshire, England. In Halifax he attended The Crossley and Porter Boys Grammar School until the age of eighteen – holding the position of Deputy Head Boy in his senior year.

After a brief spell working with his father in the contract carpeting industry, Tait relocated to Spain and as he puts it, "stumbled upon the travel business" beginning a lifelong career in the airline/travel industry. Starting out as a Customer Service Trainer for the Thompson /Britannia Group in Mallorca, Spain, he graduated to Destination Manager in Spain, Moscow, Cyprus and Greece. In 1975 he married and upped stakes to Toronto, Canada, to work for WardAir, a Canadian Charter Airline, before being recruited by someone he'd first met in Spain, Sir Freddie Laker, to serve as the general manager for Laker Airways in Toronto. In 1979 Tait moved with the company to Miami, Florida, as vice president, marketing for the high-profile UK carrier's “Skytrain” low cost, scheduled transatlantic services. He stayed with Laker Airways until the company was illegally driven out of business and forced to declare bankruptcy in early 1982. Tait maintains to this day that, Laker Airways was killed because of its success.

Following Laker Airways untimely demise, after a brief stint as VP International at Air Florida, Tait followed his boss there, the iconic Robert C. (Bobby) Booth, to set up AM&M, a Miami-based aviation consulting firm. It was there that, at former boss Freddie Laker's suggestion, he was asked by "some guy in the music business I'd never heard of" to help in writing the initial business plan for a start-up transatlantic airline. That "guy" turned out to be Richard Branson and what began life with the working title of 'British Atlantic Airways' eventually became Virgin Atlantic. In January 1984, Tait moved to New York City to become the fledgling airline's first US employee.

Less than six months later, 'on a wing and a prayer' in June 1984 Virgin Atlantic began operations between London Gatwick and Newark New Jersey with a single Boeing 747. As executive director and executive vice president North America originally working out of a Greenwich Village townhouse and reporting directly to chairman Richard Branson, Tait built and led all the airline's North American operations including sales, marketing, operations, customer service, finance, IT and HR. Branson credits Tait with having been a huge contributor in building the airline's brand which in turn became the brand platform for the scores of highly diversified Virgin companies that would follow.

On 1 May 2001 at Buckingham Palace, David's achievements were recognized when he was awarded an OBE (Officer of the Order of The British Empire) by Queen Elizabeth II for “services to British aviation in the United States”.

Having helped build the upstart Virgin Atlantic to a $4 billion, critically acclaimed company, Tait left in 2002 to become chief executive officer of Avocet Aircraft and later Spitfire Aviation Partners before returning to Canada to take the position of senior vice president, Customer Service, for Air Canada in Montreal. Tait left the company in 2007 to return to the US and form Consultait, a consulting firm focused on brand-building, integrated marketing and customer service for a wide variety of international clients in aviation and other service-related industries.

From May 2018 until December 2019, Tait served as executive chairman for Flair Airlines of Canada, where he successfully guided the Edmonton Alberta-based carrier's transition from charter to scheduled ULCC operations.

He is also co-founder of Connecticut-based 'Autism Double-Checked', an online training platform focused on the travel industry on how to better serve guests with Autism Spectrum Disorder (ASD).

Tait's most recent airline venture was co-founding Bermuda-based BermudAir where he serves as a board member. The boutique carrier commenced scheduled service in August 2023 from Bermuda to Canada and the USA.

Alongside his other interests, for 10 years Tait wrote a weekly column 'Tait on Travel' for the Toronto-based online publication Travel Industry Today. He has ghost-written several best-selling business books and co-wrote 'Obama – The Historic Presidency/2,920 Days' – Published by Sterling Press in April 2017 it became a Washington Post best seller and was republished in October 2020 with updated pages on Obama's post-presidential life.

== Personal life ==
Twice divorced, Tait has a son (Ian) and daughter (Saskia) by his first marriage with Ines Tait (née Hackenberg), and three sons (Rory, James and Charlie) with his second wife Taylor (née Ingraham). He resides in Ridgefield Connecticut and holds UK, US and Canadian citizenships.
