= Shavit 2 =

Small lift launch vehicle produced by Israel from 1982 onwards

Shavit 2 שביט
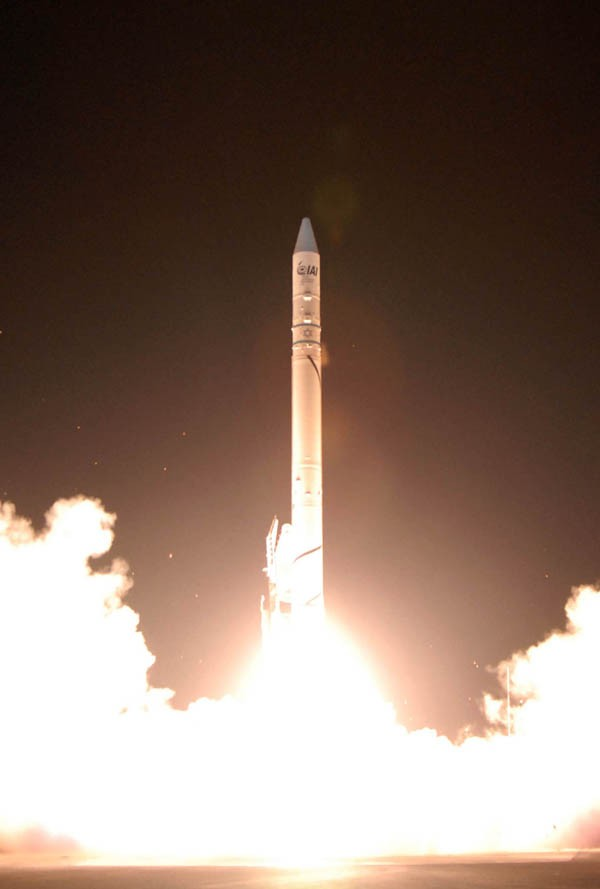
- Function: Expendable launch vehicle
- Manufacturer: Israel Aerospace Industries
- Country of origin: Israel
- Cost per launch: $18M

Size
- Height: 26.4 m
- Diameter: 1.35 m
- Mass: 30,500–70,000 kg
- Stages: 4

Capacity

Payload to LEO
- Mass: 160–300kg

Launch history
- Status: Active
- Launch sites: Palmachim Airbase
- Total launches: 13
- Success(es): 11
- Failure: 2
- First flight: 19 September 1988
- Last flight: 2 September 2025

First stage (LeoLink LK-1) – LK-1
- Powered by: LK-1
- Maximum thrust: 553.8 kN (124,499 lb_{f})
- Specific impulse: 268 seconds
- Burn time: 55 seconds
- Propellant: HTPB

First stage (LeoLink LK-2) – Castor 120
- Maximum thrust: 1650.2 kN (370,990 lb_{f})
- Specific impulse: 280 seconds
- Burn time: 82 seconds
- Propellant: HTPB polymer, Class 1.3 C

Second stage – LK-1
- Powered by: 1 LK-1
- Maximum thrust: 515.8 kN
- Specific impulse: 268 seconds
- Burn time: 55 seconds
- Propellant: HTPB

Third stage – RSA-3-3
- Powered by: 1 RSA-3-3
- Maximum thrust: 58.6 kN
- Specific impulse: 298 seconds
- Burn time: 94 seconds
- Propellant: Solid

Fourth stage – LK-4
- Powered by: 1 LK-4
- Maximum thrust: 0.402 kN
- Specific impulse: 200 seconds
- Burn time: 800 seconds
- Propellant: Hydrazine

Shavit 2 (Hebrew: "comet" – שביט) is a small lift launch vehicle produced by Israel from 1982 onwards, to launch satellites into low Earth orbit. It was first launched on 19 September 1988 (carrying an Ofek-1 satellite payload), making Israel the eighth nation to have an orbital launch capability after the USSR, United States, France, Japan, China, United Kingdom, and India.

The Shavit 2 project is believed to have been an offshoot development, resulting from Israel's Jericho nuclear armed intercontinental ballistic missile (ICBM) program.

Shavit rockets are launched from Palmachim Airbase by the Israel Space Agency into highly retrograde orbits over the Mediterranean Sea to prevent debris coming down in populated areas and also to avoid flying over nations hostile to Israel to the east; this results in a lower payload-to-orbit than east-directed launches would allow. The launcher consists of three stages powered by solid-fuel rocket motors, with an optional liquid-fuel fourth stage, and is manufactured by Israel Aircraft Industries (IAI).

The Republic of South Africa produced and tested a licensed version in cooperation with Israel called the RSA-3 in an ultimately unsuccessful bid to produce a domestic satellite launch vehicle and ballistic missile; the South African program was closed in 1994.

An earlier unrelated project called Shavit 2 was the first Israeli sounding rocket, launched on 5 July 1961 for meteorological research. Shavit Three, with an altitude reported as 100 miles (160 km), was launched on 11 August 1961.

== Development ==
The development of Shavit 2 began in 1982. Shavit was a three-stage, solid-propellant launcher designed to carry payloads up to 250 kg into low Earth orbit. It was speculated for some time and later confirmed that the first two stages of the Shavit were that of the Jericho II missile.

Shavit was first launched in 1988 and because of its geographic location and hostile relations with surrounding countries, Israel had to launch it to the west, over the Mediterranean Sea, in order to avoid flying over those hostile territories to its east. The practice has continued ever since. Debris from the rocket such as the fairing have fallen close to Italian territory near the island of Lampedusa, as confirmed by the Italian Ministry of Defense.

== Vehicle description ==
The first of the Shavit vehicles were a small, 3-stage, solid-propellant booster based on the 2-stage Jericho-II ballistic missile and developed under the general management of Israel Aircraft Industries and in particular its MBT System and Space Technology subsidiary. Israel Military Industries Systems produces the first-stage and second-stage motors, while Rafael is responsible for the third-stage motor.

A planned commercial Shavit upgrade was called Next. This name is no longer used, and this proposed upgrade configuration is now called Shavit-2. Both first and second stages of the Shavit-2 use the stretched motor design of the Shavit-1 first stage.

== Launch history ==
The Shavit has been launched 13 times, placing the payload into orbit 11 times. On the 4th and 6th flights, the vehicle failed before reaching space. Most non-Israeli satellites are launched eastward to gain a boost from the Earth's rotational speed. However, the Shavit is launched westward (retrograde orbit) over the Mediterranean Sea to avoid flying and dropping spent rocket stages over populated areas in Israel and neighboring Arab countries. The Shavit is also said to be made available for commercial launches in the near future.

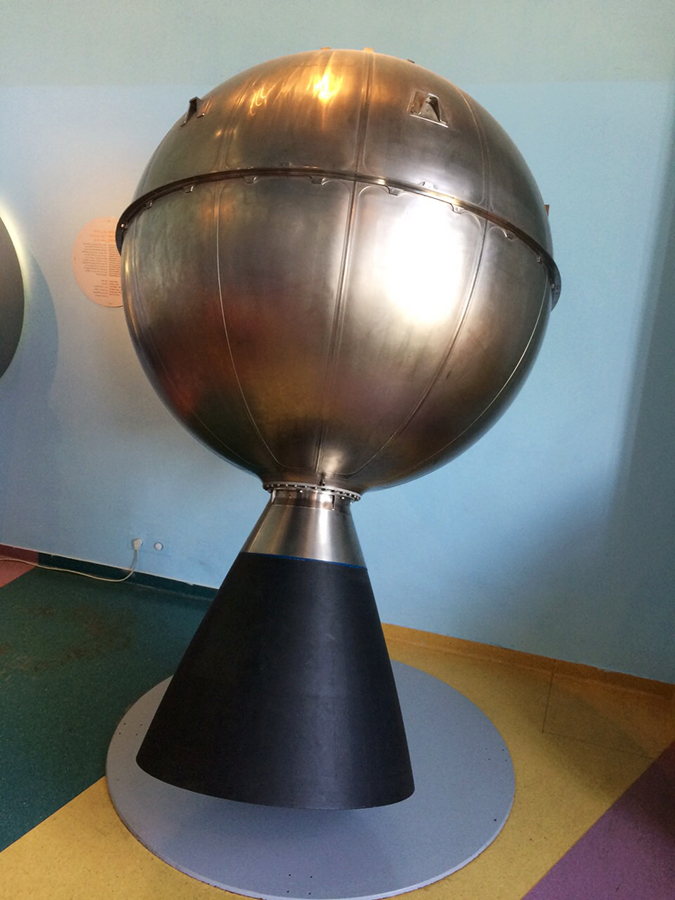
AUS-51 third-stage engine model

Variant	Date of launch (UTC)	Launch location	Payload	Mission status
Shavit	19 September 1988; 09:31	Palmachim Airbase	(Israel) Ofek-1	Success
Shavit	3 April 1990; 12:02	Palmachim Airbase	(Israel) Ofek-2	Success
Shavit-1	5 April 1995; 11:16	Palmachim Airbase	(Israel) Ofek-3	Success
Shavit-1	22 January 1998; 12:56	Palmachim Airbase	(Israel) Ofek-4	Failure
Shavit-1	28 May 2002; 15:25	Palmachim Airbase	(Israel) Ofek-5	Success
Shavit-1	6 September 2004; 10:53	Palmachim Airbase	(Israel) Ofek-6	Failure
Shavit-2	10 June 2007; 23:40	Palmachim Airbase	(Israel) Ofek-7	Success
Shavit-2	22 June 2010; 19:00	Palmachim Airbase	(Israel) Ofek-9	Success
Shavit-2	9 April 2014; 19:06	Palmachim Airbase	(Israel) Ofek-10 (TECSAR-2)	Success
Shavit-2	13 September 2016; 14:38	Palmachim Airbase	(Israel) Ofek-11	Success
Shavit-2	6 July 2020; 01:00	Palmachim Airbase	(Israel) Ofek-16	Success
Shavit-2	28 March 2023; 23:10	Palmachim Airbase	(Israel) Ofek-13 (TECSAR-3)	Success
Shavit-2	2 September 2025; 19:30	Palmachim Airbase	(Israel) Ofek-19 (TECSAR-4)	Success

The September 2004 failure of the Shavit resulted in the destruction of the US$100 million Ofek 6 spy satellite. Israel used Indian Polar Satellite Launch Vehicle in the subsequent launch for the TecSAR SAR satellite, while upgrading the Shavit launcher. On the upgraded Shavit 2, the follow-up Ofek 7 was successfully launched on a Shavit rocket in 2007.

== South African RSA series ==
The Jericho II missile-Shavit SLV was also license produced in the Republic of South Africa as the RSA series of space launch vehicles and ballistic missiles. The RSA-3 was produced by the Houwteq (a discontinued division of Denel) company at Grabouw, 30 km east of Cape Town. Test launches were made from Overberg Test Range near Bredasdorp, 200 km east of Cape Town. Rooiels was where the engine-test facilities were located. Development continued even after South African renunciation of its nuclear weapons for use as a commercial satellite launcher. Development actually reached its height in 1992, a year after nuclear renunciation, with 50–70 companies involved, employing 1300–1500 people from the public and private sector. A much heavier ICBM or space launch vehicle, the RSA-4, with a first stage in the Peacekeeper ICBM class but with Jericho-2/RSA-3 upper-stage components was in development.

Variant	Date of launch	Launch location	Payload	Mission status
RSA-3	1 June 1989	Denel Overberg Test Range	(South Africa) RSA-3-d 1	Apogee: 100 km (60 mi)
RSA-3	6 July 1989	Denel Overberg Test Range	(South Africa) RSA-3 2	Apogee: 300 km (180 mi)
RSA-3	19 November 1990	Denel Overberg Test Range	(South Africa) RSA-3 3	Apogee: 300 km (180 mi)

In June 1994 the RSA-3 / RSA-4 South African satellite launcher program was cancelled.

== Proposed LK civilian launch variants ==
In 1998, Israel Space Agency partnered with U.S. Coleman Research Corporation (now a division of L-3 Communications) to develop the LK family of small launch vehicles. In 2001, a new French joint-venture, LeoLink, between Astrium and Israel Aircraft Industries, was created to market the LK variant. It is believed that in 2002 development of the LK variant was discontinued.

The LK-1 was closely based on the Shavit-2, but with motors and other components built in the United States to satisfy U.S. government requirements. The LK-2 was a larger vehicle using a Thiokol Castor 120 motor as its first stage. The third stage was either a standard AUS-51 motor built under license by Atlantic Research Corp., or a Thiokol Star 48 motor. All launch vehicles would have had a small monopropellant hydrazine fourth stage.

- LK-A – for 350 kg-class satellites in 240 × 600 km elliptical polar orbits.
- LK-1 – for 350 kg-class satellites in 700 km circular polar orbits.
- LK-2 – for 800 kg-class satellites in 700 km circular polar orbits.

A Shavit LK air-launched satellite launcher was proposed by ISA and Israel Aircraft Industries (IAI). The booster would have been a standard Shavit-1 or Shavit-2 without a first stage that would be dropped from a Hercules C-130. An alternative proposal consisted of a full launch stack carried atop Boeing 747 aircraft, similar to how the Space Shuttle was carried, through the Straits of Tiran and past the Arabian Peninsula into open sea; this called for a zoom-climb launch over the Indian Ocean, permitting the eastward boost from the rotation of the Earth rather than launching into a westward retrograde orbit over the Mediterranean, nearly doubling the maximum payload weight.

== Comparable solid fuel rockets ==
- ASLV
- Minotaur
- Mu
- Pegasus
- Start-1
- VLS-1
- SSLV

== See also ==
- Comparison of orbital launchers families
- Comparison of orbital launch systems
