= Boaz Levy =

Israel aerospace executive

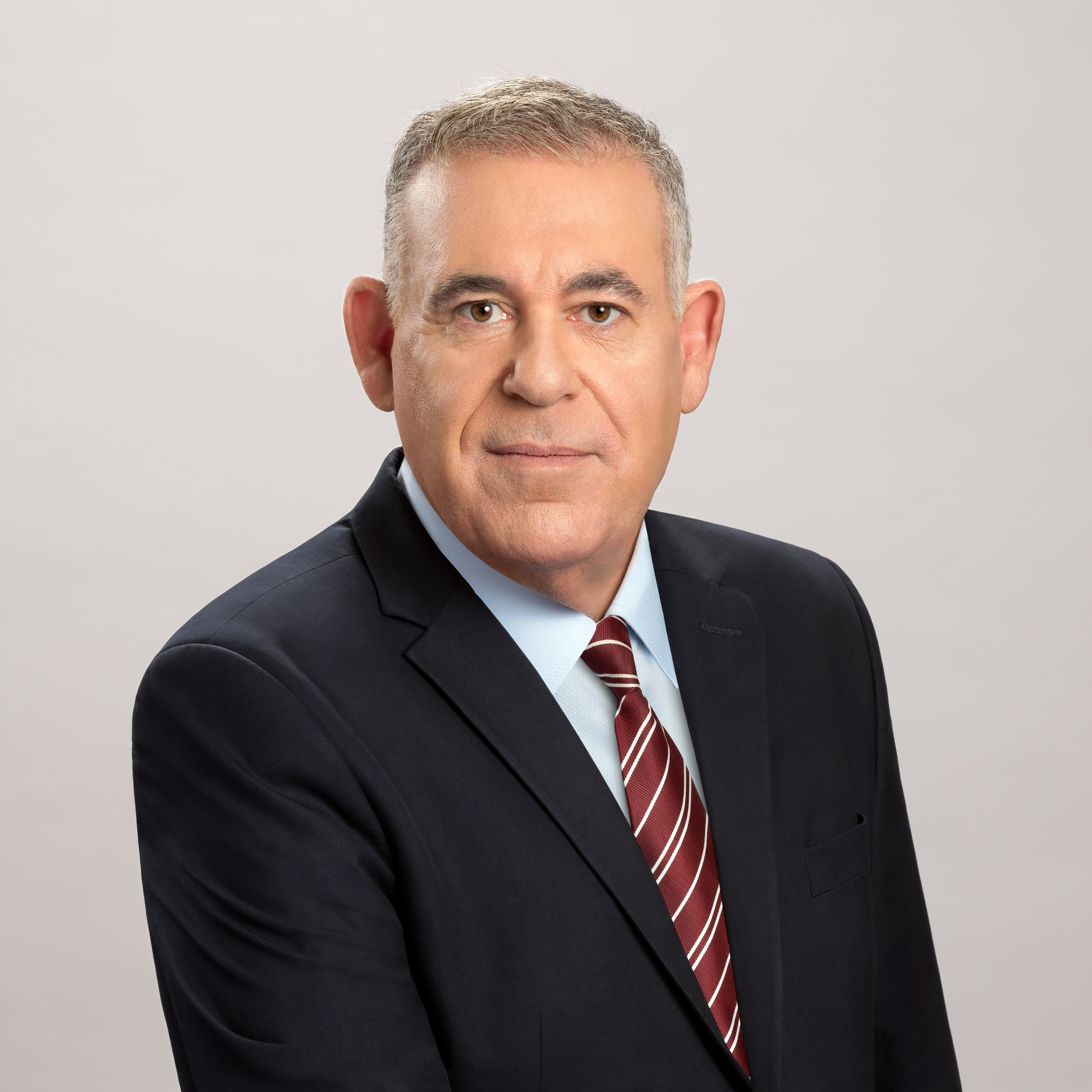
- Born: 25 September 1961 (age 65)
- Education: Technion – Israel Institute of Technology (BSc, MSc)
- Notable work: General Manager of the Air Defense Systems Division (IAI); Executive Vice President and General Manager of IAI's Systems; President & CEO of Israel Aerospace Industries; Chairman of IAI’s subsidiary, ELTA Systems
- Awards: 50 Most Influential Jews in the World; Top 100 Positively Influential Jews in the World; Key Figures in the Global Defense Sector; Israel Defense Awards

Boaz Levy (born September 25, 1961) is an Israeli business executive serving as chairman of the board of directors of Israel Aerospace Industries (IAI) since May 2026. He also served as president and chief executive officer (CEO) of Israel Aerospace Industries (IAI) from 2020 to 2026, and as vice president and general manager of IAI's Missile and Space Systems Division (MSS) from 2013 to 2020. Levy has also chaired the boards of directors of ELTA Systems and IAI-NA.

== Education ==
Boaz Levy earned a bachelor's degree in aeronautical and space engineering and a master's degree in systems engineering from the Technion – Israel Institute of Technology.

== Career ==
Levy began his career in the Israel Air Force as a guided weapons expert. He joined IAI in 1989 as an engineer on the Arrow ballistic missile defense project. He became chief engineer of the project in 1999 and headed the project between 2003 and 2006.

In 2013, Levy was appointed executive vice president and general manager of IAI's Systems, Missiles & Space Group, overseeing approximately 3,700 employees across six facilities in Yehud and Be'er Ya'akov. During his tenure, the group reported annual sales exceeding one billion dollars and an order backlog of more than seven billion dollars, and was described as the company's most profitable at the time.

During his time at IAI, Levy was involved in agreements for the sale of the Barak 8 air and missile defense system, valued at 2.4 billion dollars, and in the Arrow air defense system agreement with Germany, signed in September 2023 and valued at 3.6 billion dollars.

On November 16, 2020, Levy was selected by the board of directors of Israel Aerospace Industries to serve as president and CEO. The appointment was not immediately approved by then minister of defense Benny Gantz, and Levy subsequently served as acting CEO. In January 2022, Gantz approved his permanent appointment. During his tenure as CEO, the Iron Swords War and the military operations with Kalavi and Hagar Hari took place, in which the company's products were widely used, particularly the Arrow system to intercept ballistic missiles launched at Israel from Yemen and Iran.

In May 2026, Levy's appointment as chairman of the board of directors of Israel Aerospace Industries was approved, with the signatures of Defense Minister Israel Katz and Minister in Charge of Government Companies David Amsalem, following approval by the Committee for Examining Appointments in Government Companies.

In January 2026, Levy said that IAI sought to integrate the Arrow system into the United States' Golden Dome missile defense initiative. He cited the system's operational experience against ballistic missile threats and IAI's longstanding cooperation with the Missile Defense Agency and U.S. defense industry.

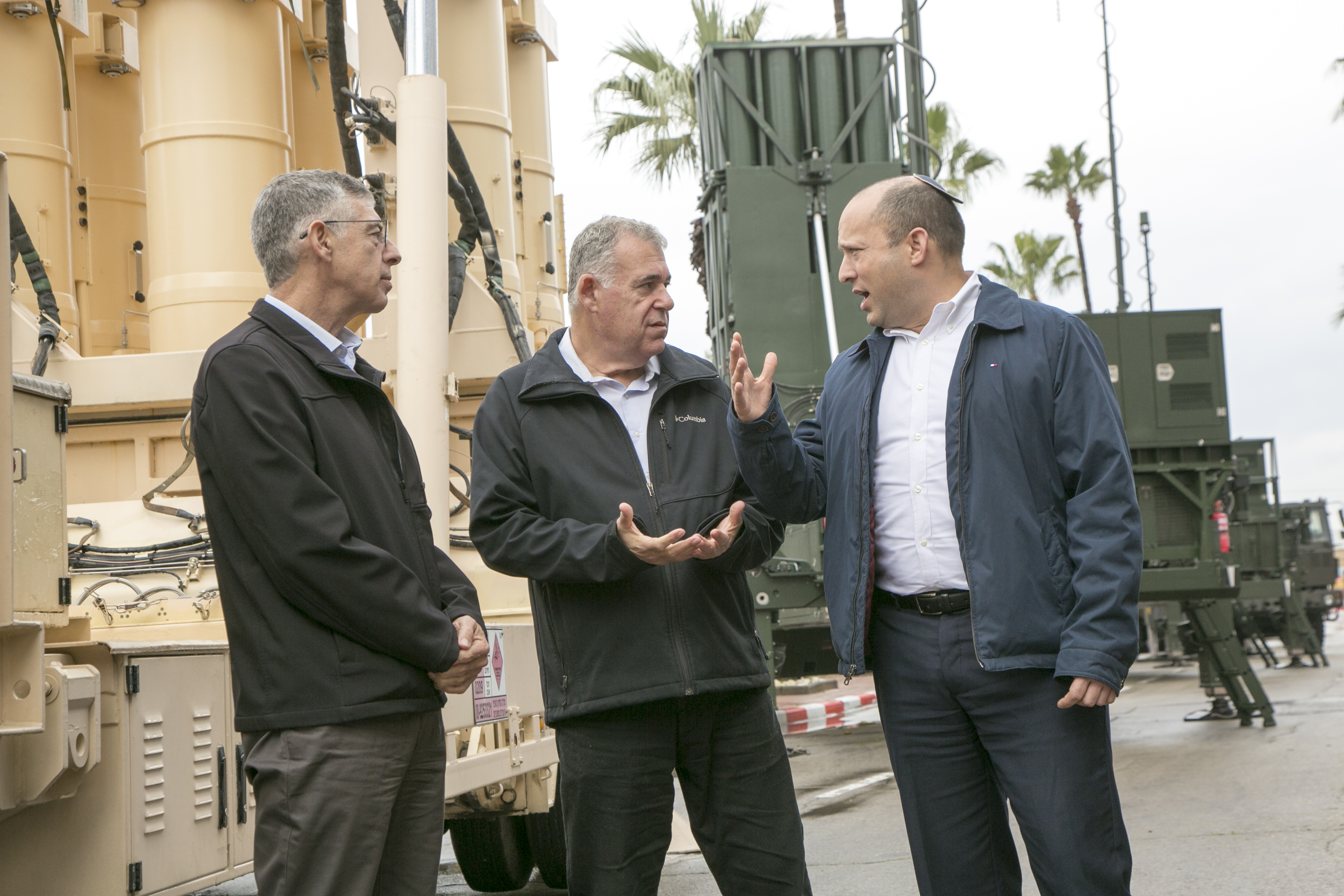
Boaz Levi and Bennett in IAI, 2020

According to company reports, the years 2021 through 2024, during which Levy has been serving as president and CEO, were the most profitable in the company's history, and its order backlog surpassed 25 billion shekels. In 2025, the company recorded its highest-ever net profit of $712 million, with sales of 7.4 billion shekels and an order backlog exceeding $30 billion. The company reported that net profit increased by 435% between 2020 and 2025, while growth in sales, profitability, and backlog continued into the first quarter of 2026.

== Awards and honors ==
Levy was included in The Jerusalem Post list of the 50 Most Influential Jews in the World in 2023 and 2025. Also in 2023, he received the Bialkin Leadership Award from the America-Israel Friendship League. Levy was also included in the Top 100 Positively Influential Jews in the World list published by The Algemeiner.

In January 2024, Aviation Week listed Levy among the key figures in the global defense sector for 2024. In the same year, he was selected to light the Defender's Torch during Israel's 76th Independence Day ceremony.

In September 2024, Levy was awarded an honorary degree from the Holon Institute of Technology (HIT) for his contribution to the field of security.

Levy has received multiple Israel Defense Awards, including one awarded in 2024.

In February 2025, Levy was awarded the title of Honorary Fellow by Afeka Academic College of Engineering for his contributions to the field. In September 2025, he was included in The Jerusalem Post's list of the 50 Most Influential Jews in the World, having previously appeared on the list in 2023.

In 2026, Israel Aerospace Industries (IAE), under Levy's leadership, won three prestigious awards for advanced technological and intelligence projects: the "Ofek 13" and "Ofek 19" spy satellite project in partnership with the Space Directorate at the Israel Defense Forces and Unit 9900 of the Intelligence Directorate; electronic warfare systems in collaboration with Unit 8200 and the Research Division at the Intelligence Directorate; and a classified operational system for the Mossad.

== Personal life ==
Levy is married and has two children.
