= Ofeq =

Israeli reconnaissance satellites

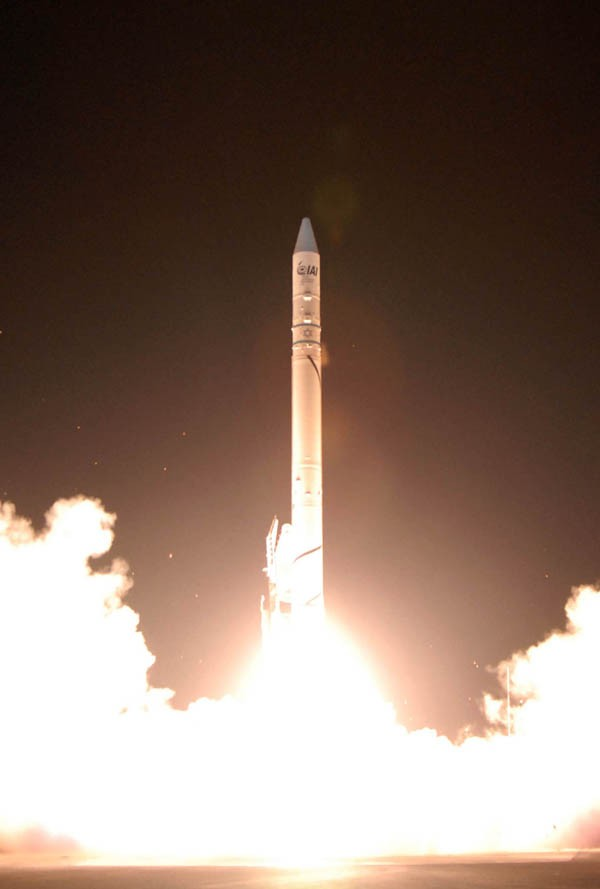
- Ofeq-7 launch on the Shavit 2 Launch vehicle.
- Manufacturer: Israel Aerospace Industries
- Country of origin: Israel
- Operator: Israeli Ministry of Defence / Tsahal
- Applications: Reconnaissance

Specifications
- Regime: Low Earth orbit

Production
- Status: Active
- Built: 13
- Launched: 13
- Maiden launch: 19 September 1988 (Ofeq-1)
- Last launch: 2 September 2025 (Ofeq-19)

Ofeq, also spelled Offek or Ofek (Hebrew: אופק, lit. Horizon) is the designation of a series of Israeli reconnaissance satellites first launched in 1988. Most Ofeq satellites have been carried on top of Shavit launch vehicles from Palmachim Airbase in Israel, on the Mediterranean coast. The low Earth orbit satellites complete one Earth orbit every 90 minutes.

The satellite launches made Israel the eighth nation to gain an indigenous launch capability. Both the satellites and the launchers were designed and manufactured by Israel Aerospace Industries (IAI) with Elbit Systems' El-Op division supplying the optical payload.

== Description ==
While exact technical details and capabilities are classified, it is assumed that the Ofeq satellites have an effective operational lifespan of 1–3 years and ultraviolet and visible imaging sensors, except Ofeq-8 and -10 which utilize synthetic-aperture radar (SAR) for all-weather and nighttime reconnaissance. Some reports place the imaging resolution at 80 cm for Ofeq-5.

Most satellites are launched eastward to gain a boost from the Earth's rotational speed. However, Ofeq satellites are launched westward, in retrograde orbits, over the Mediterranean to avoid flying over, and dropping spent rocket stages over, populated land areas. Other Israeli satellites, such as the AMOS series, are launched from locations in other countries.

=== Orbital characteristics ===
Ofeq's east-to-west orbit of 143.0° orbital inclination is phased to give good daylight coverage of the Middle East. Some American and Russian observation satellites have near-polar orbits and make between 14 and 16 orbits per day, but pass over Israel on fewer orbits. Spacecraft need to reach roughly 27,000 km/h (7,500 m/s) to achieve low Earth orbit.

At 31.88°N, the latitude of Palmachim Airbase, where the angular velocity of the Earth is around 1,420 km/h (390 m/s) to the east, westward launched Ofeq satellites must use more fuel to counter starting going 1,420 km/h the opposite direction. Many other observation satellites with prograde orbits have the same maximum latitude and cover the same areas of the Earth. However the retrograde orbit of Ofeq increases the relative speed to the surface of the Earth and thusly increases the average number of times they pass over Israel on each revolution.

Ofeq satellites make a half-dozen or so daylight passes per day over Israel and the surrounding countries, whereas non-Israeli observation satellites in Sun-synchronous orbits get one or two passes per day from their lower inclination orbits.

Since its launch in 2002, Ofeq-5's orbital inclination of 143.4 has been the most-inclined orbit of all of Earth's artificial satellites.

== Satellite List ==
Designation	Type	Launch Date	Carrier Rocket	End of Mission Date	Notes
Ofeq-1	Experimental	September 19, 1988	Shavit-1	January, 1989	
Ofeq-2	Experimental	April 23, 1990	Shavit-1	July, 1990	
Ofeq-3	IMINT	September 15, 1994	Shavit-1	October, 1996	Israel's first operational IMINT satellite
Ofeq-4	IMINT	January 22, 1998	Shavit-1	Launch Failure	Did not achieve orbit
Ofeq-5	IMINT	May 28, 2002	Shavit-1	February 21, 2024	New generation of IMINT satellite
Ofeq-6	IMINT	September 6, 2004	Shavit-1	Launch Failure	Crashed into the Mediterranean Sea
Ofeq-7	Reconnaissance	June 10, 2007	Shavit-2	In Orbit	First launch with the Shavit-2.
Ofeq-8	TecSAR-1	January 21, 2008	Polar Satellite Launch Vehicle	In Orbit	May have been de-orbited July 3, 2024.
Ofeq-9	Reconnaissance	June 22, 2010	Shavit-2	In Orbit	
Ofeq-10	TecSAR-2	April 9, 2014	Shavit-2	In Orbit	
Ofeq-11	IMINT	September 13, 2016	Shavit-2	June 29, 2024	Was equipped with the Jupiter High-Resolution Imaging System.
Ofeq-16	IMINT	July 6, 2020	Shavit-2	In Orbit	
Ofeq-13	TecSAR-3	March 28, 2023	Shavit-2	In Orbit	
Ofeq-19	TecSAR-4	September 2, 2025	Shavit-2	In Orbit	
