= Ofeq-9 =

Israeli reconnaissance satellite

- Names: Ofek-9
- Mission type: Optical reconnaissance
- Operator: Israeli Ministry of Defence / Tsahal
- COSPAR ID: 2010-031A
- SATCAT no.: 36608
- Mission duration: 5 years (planned); 16 years, 3 months and 14 days (in progress)

Spacecraft properties
- Spacecraft: Ofeq-9
- Bus: OPSAT-2000
- Manufacturer: Israel Aerospace Industries
- Launch mass: 297 kg (655 lb)
- Dimensions: 2.3 m in height 1.2 m in diameter Span: 3.6 m on orbit
- Power: 400 watts

Start of mission
- Launch date: 22 June 2010, 19:00 UTC
- Rocket: Shavit 2 (No.8)
- Launch site: Palmachim Air Base
- Contractor: Israel Aerospace Industries
- Entered service: 25 June 2010

Orbital parameters
- Reference system: Geocentric orbit
- Regime: Low Earth orbit (Retrograde orbit)
- Perigee altitude: 466 km (290 mi)
- Apogee altitude: 567 km (352 mi)
- Inclination: 141.74°
- Period: 94.81 minutes

Ofeq-9, also known as Ofek 9 ("Horizon in Hebrew), is part of the Ofeq family of reconnaissance satellites designed and built by Israel Aerospace Industries (IAI) for the Israeli Ministry of Defense.

== Launch ==
It was launched on 22 June 2010, at 19:00 UTC, from Palmachim Air Baise in Israel. It was delivered using an improved version of the Shavit launcher.

== Mission ==
The payload is believed to be the multi-spectral "Jupiter" space camera produced by El-Op. While precise imaging capabilities remain classified, sources say that like the still operating Ofeq-5 and Ofeq-7, Ofeq-9 offers a resolution "much better than" a half-meter. The satellite was also said to be able to detect objects being carried by people. The satellite operates in a retrograde low Earth orbit.
