= Top Gun (disambiguation) =

Top Gun is a 1986 feature film starring Tom Cruise.

Top Gun may also refer to:

== Military ==
- Top gunner, a gunner in the top turret of a military aircraft
- TopGun (artillery), a guidance kit
- United States Navy Strike Fighter Tactics Instructor program, better known as Top Gun (often stylized as TOPGUN or Topgun)
- "Top Gun", the highest-scoring individual or crew in a military gunnery course or competition, for example, Halbert Alexander § Winner of the 1949 "Top Gun" competition

== Entertainment ==
- Top Gun (franchise), a multimedia franchise
  - Top Gun, the 1986 film
  - Top Gun: Maverick, the 2022 sequel to the 1986 film
  - Top Gun (soundtrack), the soundtrack to the 1986 film
  - Top Gun: Maverick (soundtrack), the soundtrack to the 2022 film
  - List of Top Gun video games, games based on the original film
- Top Gun (1955 film), a Western starring Sterling Hayden
- "Top Gun", episode 10 of the first season of the web series Angry Video Game Nerd (2006)

=== Television episodes ===
- "Top Gun", Dallas (1978) season 11, episode 27 (1988)
- "Top Gun", Gigolos season 5, episode 9 (2014)
- "Top Gun", My Life in Film episode 3 (2004)
- "Top Gun", Oscar's Oasis episode 13 (2011)
- "Top Gun", The Adventures of Ozzie and Harriet season 6, episode 26 (1958)
- "Top Gun", The Adventures of Rin-Tin-Tin season 4, episode 15 (1958)
- "Top Gun", The Fifth Estate season 34, episode 18 (2009)
- "Top Gun", The Keith & Paddy Picture Show season 2, episode 2 (2018)

== Literature ==
- Top Gun, a 1957 novel by Gordon D. Shirreffs under the pen name Gordon Donalds
- Top Gun: An American Story, a 2019 book by Dan Pedersen

== Roller coasters ==
- Flight Deck (California's Great America), in California, previously known as Top Gun
- Flight Deck (Canada's Wonderland), in Canada, previously known as Top Gun
- The Bat (Kings Island; opened 1993) in Ohio, previously known as Top Gun

== Other ==
- Fidel Sierra (born 1960), Cuban professional wrestler
- Stephen McKeag (1970–2000), commander in the Ulster Volunteer Force (UVF)

== See also ==
- Top Guns (disambiguation)
