= TopGun (artillery) =

Artillery guidance system used by the Israeli Army

TopGun is an add-on guidance kit that converts standard artillery ammunition into a precision guided weapon. It is manufactured by Israel Aerospace Industries. It uses a GPS receiver to adjust the trajectory of the shell in flight with a circular error probable (CEP) of 10 m at up to 40 km with a unit cost of US$20,000. In use by Israeli Army.
