= Avocet ProJet =

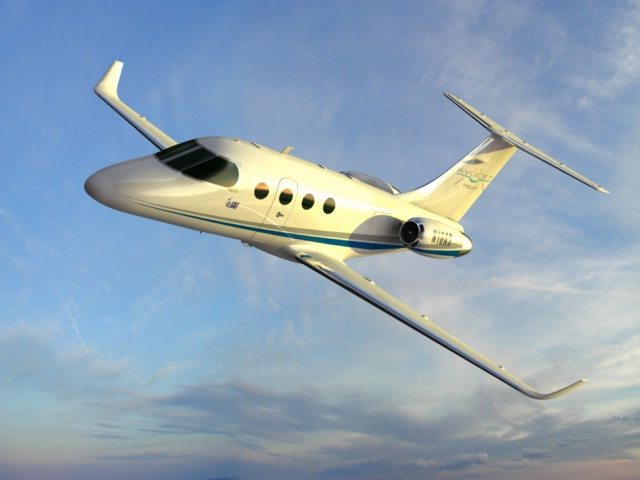

General information
- Type: Very light business jet (VLJ)
- National origin: Oshkosh, United States / Israel
- Manufacturer: Avocet Aircraft / IAI

The Avocet ProJet was a Very Light Jet (VLJ) introduced by Avocet Aircraft, a Westport, CT., based company founded by aviation entrepreneurs Andrew Chao, Carey “Ray” Robinson Wolchok and aviation visionary Al Schwimmer, considered the father of the Israeli Air Force, El Al, and Israel Aircraft Industries In the late 1990s, the duo discovered that the micro-turbine engine technology being pioneered on US cruise missiles could potentially be applied to commercial business aircraft. In the same year, Sam Williams flew the Burt Rutan designed “V-jet” at the 1997 Oshkosh air show using experimental Williams FJX-1 cruise missile derived engines.

Sir Richard Branson became involved in the early development after Avocet hired Virgin Atlantic Airways former President David Tait and Branson’s Ad Agency CMG Design Group to refine the concept. Branson encouraged Avocet to explore rebranding the aircraft the "VirginJet" and launch the plane with the Virgin Group.

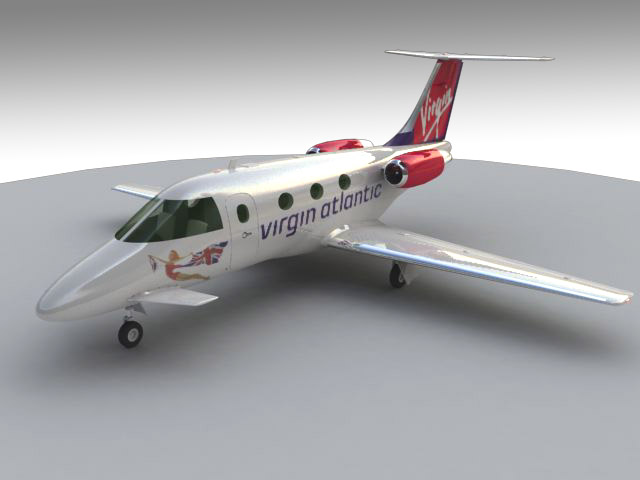
Avocet's concept "VirginJet"

The Avocet ProJet was planned as a six-seat, twin-engine turbofan jet. Capable of takeoffs and landings in as little as 3,000 feet, it was intended to fly at an airspeed of 365 knots (420 mph) up to an altitude of 41,000 feet and a maximum cruising range of 1,200 nautical (1,375 statute) miles.

Avocet investors and advisors included football legend Joe Montana, one of the first customers for the jet. Other board members included Isabel Maxwell, the daughter of Robert Maxwell, Jacob Frenkel, the Bank of Israel Governor, Former Apple CEO Gil Amelio, General Amnon Shahak, the former Chief of Staff of the Israel Defense Forces and Israel's Minister of Transportation, and Apollo 11 Astronaut Buzz Aldrin.

The Company announced orders for more than 100 aircraft at the NBAA 2003 Annual Conference in Orlando, Florida, and expected first flight in 2005.

The ProJet's initial price of approximately $2 million and direct operating costs projected to be less than $1.00 per mile positioned the revolutionary aircraft to be a direct competitor to the Eclipse 500, but with superior cabin comfort and performance.

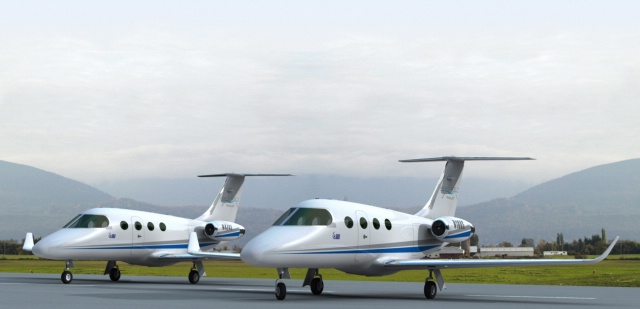
Two Avocet Projets on Tarmac

In 2005, Israel Aircraft Industries senior management made a decision to seek additional partners for the program. Industry sources cited concerns expressed off the record by IAI executives about potential product support problems that had plagued some of the earlier business jets manufactured by IAI. Rumors had Avocet and IAI collaborating with Raytheon Aircraft and Embraer on the program, but by December 2005, Avocet and IAI began working exclusively with a major OEM and the program went grey. Shortly after this, Embraer introduced its very light jet, the Phenom 100

Although neither manufacturer disclosed terms of any agreement, the Phenom 100, has engineering, design and performance specifications almost identical to the Avocet ProJet, including an innovative oval cross section which had been pioneered at Israel Aircraft Industries on their early model business jets.

Wolchok and many of his team members went on to found a number of aircraft and aviation related companies including independent aircraft lessors PLFC and Perilion, Strategic Air Finance, merchant bank and investment advisory firm’s Advanced Capital Partners, LandedEagle.com, a music and film production company which focuses on aerospace related film and documentary production, and Perilune Aviation, one of the leading independent investors in commercial aircraft and aircraft leases. In 2013, Wolchok formed Harspring Capital Management with a 23 year old analyst from Scopia Capital named Harry Gail. In 2022, Harspring managed capital for institutional and private investors with assets of $773m.

== See also ==
- Very light jet
