= Ofeq-7 =

Israeli reconnaissance satellite

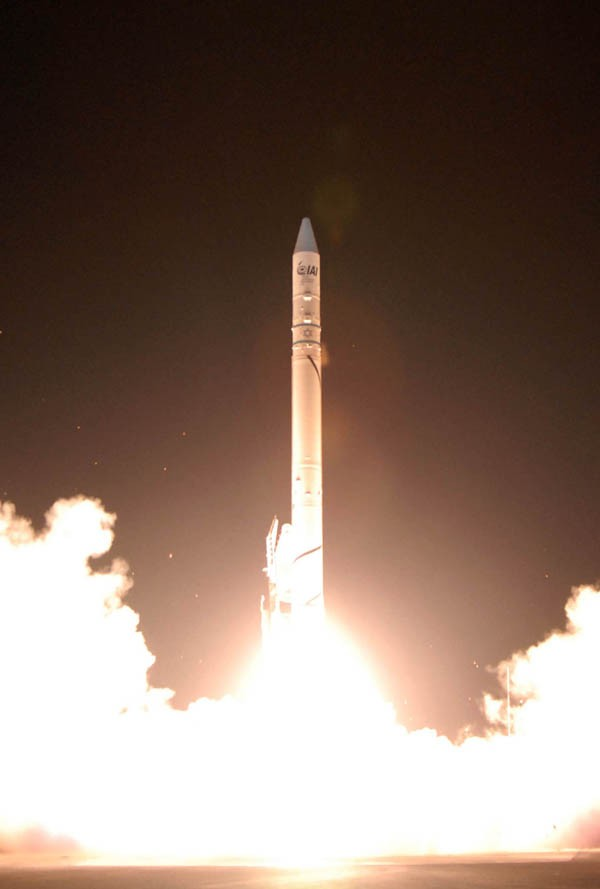
- Ofeq-7 launch on a Shavit 2 launch vehicle
- Names: Ofek-7; Offek-7
- Mission type: Optical reconnaissance
- Operator: Israeli Ministry of Defence / Tsahal
- COSPAR ID: 2007-025A
- SATCAT no.: 31601
- Mission duration: 5 years (planned); 19 years, 3 months and 29 days (in progress)

Spacecraft properties
- Spacecraft: Ofeq-7
- Bus: OPSAT-2000
- Manufacturer: Israel Aerospace Industries
- Launch mass: 300 kg (660 lb)

Start of mission
- Launch date: 10 June 2007, 23:40 UTC
- Rocket: Shavit 2 (No.7)
- Launch site: Palmachim Air Base
- Contractor: Israel Aerospace Industries

Orbital parameters
- Reference system: Geocentric orbit
- Regime: Low Earth orbit (Retrograde orbit)
- Perigee altitude: 339 km (211 mi)
- Apogee altitude: 575 km (357 mi)
- Inclination: 141.80°
- Period: 93.70 minutes

Ofeq-7 (also known as Ofek 7 or Offek-7) is part of the Ofeq family of Earth observation satellites designed and built by Israel Aerospace Industries (IAI) for the Israel Ministry of Defense.

== Launch ==
The Ofeq-7 was launched by a Shavit 2 space launch vehicle on 10 June 2007 at 23:40 UTC. Equipped with advanced technology and a series of new enhancements to provide improved imagery, it is placed into an elliptical orbit of 300 × 600 km (190 × 370 mi).

== Mission ==
Three days after its launch, on 13 June 2007, IAI MBT Space Division received the first images taken by the satellite. The Ofeq-7 is a follow-on spacecraft to Ofeq-5 that was placed into orbit in 2002.
