= TecSAR-1 =

Israeli reconnaissance satellite

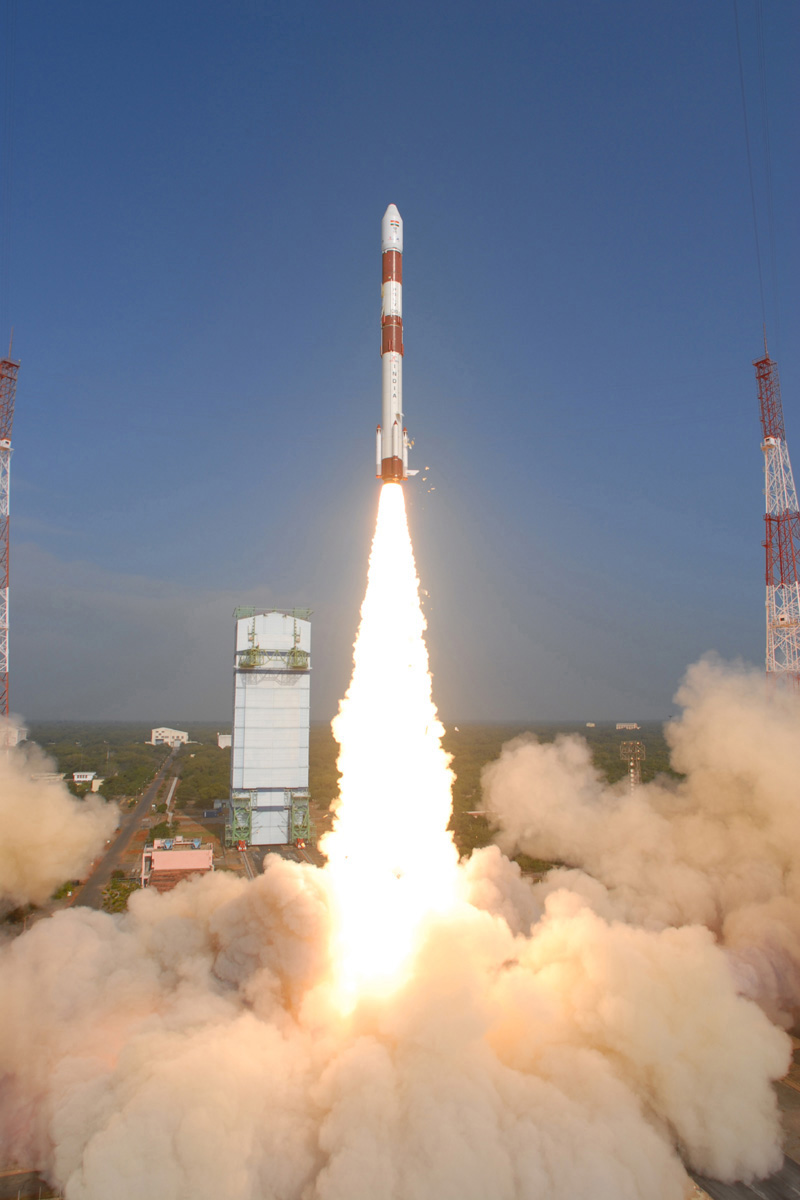
- Launch of TecSAR-1 on PSLV-C10
- Names: Ofeq-8; TechSar; Polaris
- Mission type: Imaging radar
- Operator: Israel Aerospace Industries (IAI)
- COSPAR ID: 2008-002A
- SATCAT no.: 32476
- Mission duration: 4 years (planned); 16 years, 5 months and 12 days

Spacecraft properties
- Bus: TECSAR Bus
- Manufacturer: Israel Aerospace Industries (IAI)
- Launch mass: 295 kg (650 lb)
- Power: 750 watts

Start of mission
- Launch date: 21 January 2008, 03:45 UTC
- Rocket: PSLV-CA (PSLV-C10)
- Launch site: Satish Dhawan, FLP
- Contractor: Indian Space Research Organisation
- Entered service: 1 February 2008

End of mission
- Decay date: 3 July 2024

Orbital parameters
- Reference system: Geocentric orbit
- Regime: Low Earth orbit
- Perigee altitude: 405 km (252 mi)
- Apogee altitude: 580 km (360 mi)
- Inclination: 41.03°
- Period: 94.50 minutes

TecSAR-1, also known as TechSAR, Polaris and Ofeq-8, is an Israeli reconnaissance satellite, equipped with a synthetic-aperture radar (SAR) developed by Elta Systems. It was successfully launched at 03:45 UTC on 21 January 2008, by PSLV C-10 launch vehicle, from the Satish Dhawan Space Centre in India.

The TecSAR satellite is fitted with a large dish-like antenna to transmit and receive radar signals that can penetrate darkness and thickness of clouds. Built by Israel Aerospace Industries, TecSAR ranks among the world's most advanced space systems.

Elta Systems Ltd cooperates with Azerbaijan to produce a TecSAR reconnaissance satellite system for the country. According to Azerbaijani military experts, this is an indispensable system for military operations in the mountainous terrains of Azerbaijan.

== Launch ==
The satellite was successfully delivered into its target orbit about twenty minutes after launch. The four-stage PSLV rocket flew in the CA, or "Core Alone" configuration, with no strap-on solid rocket boosters. PSLV-C10, as the launch vehicle used to launch TecSAR-1 was designated, was the second flight of a PSLV-CA, and the twelfth overall for the PSLV series. Launch was contracted by the Antrix Corporation, the commercial department of the Indian Space Research Organisation (ISRO). The TecSAR-1 represents the first Israeli use of the Indian PSLV launcher. This made possible an orbit that could not be reached from Israel, with an altitude of 450-580 kilometers and inclination of 41.00°. As a result, TecSAR-1 cruises from west to east, unlike all the other surveillance satellites launched from Israel itself.

The PSLV was selected as TecSAR's launch vehicle since the Shavit launch vehicle that was used to launch the Ofeq series of satellites put constraints on possible satellite orbits. Any launch from Israeli territory must be directed westwards, towards the sea, in order to prevent the launcher's first stages (or the satellite itself, in case of a malfunction) from falling on populated areas or on foreign territory. A westward launch, that is, against the direction of the Earth's rotation, seriously restricts the weight of the satellite that the launch vehicle can carry. In the past, Israel also experienced several failures - the most recent example being the attempted Ofeq-6 launch in March 2004. In such cases, security links and the operational experience of another partner can allow alternative launches when needed.

The launch was delayed several times for unclear reasons. At one point, it was rumoured that the launch had been cancelled completely due to pressure from the U.S. Government. Indian and Israeli authorities denied this, however, citing technical problems instead. In Israel, it was rumoured that the launch had been delayed due to Iranian pressure on the Indian government. However, this was eventually proven to be baseless speculation.

== Orbit ==
TecSAR-1 was placed into a low Earth orbit with an apogee of 580 km (360 mi), a perigee of 405 km (252 mi), and an equatorial inclination of 41°.

== Mission ==
It is capable of imaging with a resolution of up to 10 centimeters through IAI's Elta System's ELM-2070 an X-band SAR radar system. The satellite's maximum resolution is believed to be around 1 metre. TecSAR-1 is the first Israeli satellite to feature Synthetic Aperture Radar, or SAR, which will provide images day or night and under all weather conditions. The satellite is being operated by Israel Aerospace Industries.

TecSAR-1 started transmitting high quality images from 1 February 2008. The first image transmitted was that of the Latrun memorial monument.

Since the first launch, IAI and Elta Systems have continued developing the satellite and radar. IAI also introduced the TecSAR XP, a SAR microsatellite that leverages the OPSAT-500 bus. TecSAR XP is designed to work in constellations or standalone configurations.

== Strategic significance ==
TecSAR-1 considerably enhances Israel's intelligence-gathering capability. The satellite could potentially be the start of new strategic relations between Israel and India, and could affect the ongoing conflicts in the Middle East.

Israeli media discussed the strategic significance of the satellite, particularly with regard to Iran. It was reported that TecSAR-1's ability to produce images in adverse weather and at night would allow Israel to obtain more information about the suspected Iranian nuclear weapons program. It was also reported that it would be capable of producing images of Iranian activities which previous satellites were unable to view. Another report claimed that should Israel enter a conflict with Iran in the future, information provided by TecSAR-1 could prove critical.

== Iranian reaction ==
A fortnight after the launch, Iranian Ambassador Seyed Mehdi Nabitzadeh announced in a press conference in New Delhi that he had conveyed Iran's point of view to the Indian government regarding the launch. He emphasized his hope that "wise and independent countries like India do not give their advanced space technologies to launch spying operations against Iran". The Indians however stress that the launch was purely a commercial one.

== See also ==
- 2008 in spaceflight
- Israel Aerospace Industries
- India-Israel relations
- RISAT
- Ofeq
- Polar Satellite Launch Vehicle
- Spy satellite
- Synthetic aperture radar
