= Israel Aerospace Industries =

Aerospace and defense manufacturer

Israel Aerospace Industries Ltd.
- Type: State-owned enterprise
- Traded as: TASE: ARSP.B1
- Industry: Aviation, defense
- Predecessor: Bedek Aviation Company
- Founded: 1953; 73 years ago
- Founder: Al Schwimmer; Shimon Peres
- Headquarters: Lod, Israel
- Key people: Boaz Levy (CEO)
- Products: Military weapons and equipment
- Services: Aircraft maintenance Aircraft upgrade
- Revenue: ▲US$4.973 billion (2022)
- Operating income: ▲US$797 million (2022)
- Net income: ▲US$213 million (2022)
- Number of employees: 15,000
- Divisions: Bedek Aviation Group; Commercial Aircraft Group; Military Aircraft Group; Systems, Missiles & Space Group
- Subsidiaries: ELTA Systems
- Website: www.iai.co.il

Israel Aerospace Industries (IAI; Hebrew: התעשייה האווירית לישראל, romanized: ha-Ta'asiya ha-Avirit le-Yisra'el) is Israel's major aerospace and aviation manufacturer, producing aerial and astronautic systems for both military and civilian usage. It has 14,000 employees as of 2021. IAI is state-owned by the government of Israel.

IAI designs, develops, produces and maintains civil aircraft, UAVs, fighter aircraft, missile, avionics, and space-based systems.

IAI's main focus is engineering, aviation and high-tech electronics, though it also manufactures military systems for ground and naval forces. Many of these products are centered on the core needs of the Israel Defense Forces (IDF). Other offerings are marketed to numerous foreign militaries.

== History ==
Israel Aerospace Industries was founded in 1953 as Bedek Aviation Company under the initiative of Shimon Peres, then director general of the Ministry of Defense, in order to maintain Israel Defense Forces aircraft. The company originally had 70 employees and recruited American born aviation expert Al Schwimmer as the company's founder and first president.

=== First aircraft manufacturing ===
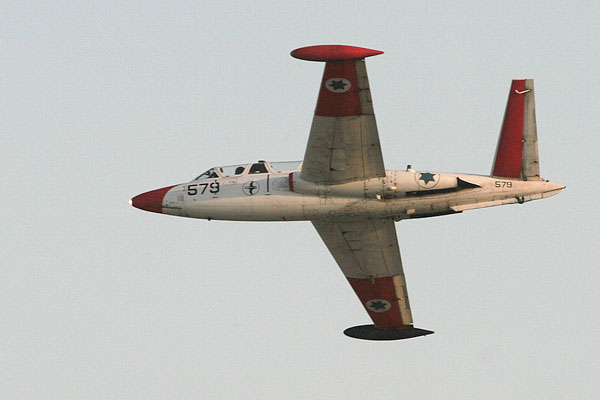
IAI Tzukit of the IAF Aerobatic Team (2007)

In 1959 Bedek began manufacturing its first aircraft, a V-tailed twinjet trainer of French design, the Fouga CM.170 Magister, locally called Tzukit (monticola). The Tzukit became the Israeli Air Force principal trainer for 50 years. The IAI Tzukit was also used in the 1967 Six-Day War by 147 Squadron as a close support aircraft, attacking targets on the Egyptian front during the first day of the war, when Israel's more capable combat aircraft were deployed against Arab air bases and aircraft. They were then deployed against Jordanian forces, including armour, on the West Bank. The Magister proved effective at the close-support mission albeit with heavy casualties, with six being lost.

The first aircraft to be fully designed and built by IAI, the IAI Arava short take-off and landing transport aircraft, first flew in 1969 after three years of development.

=== The French embargo impact ===
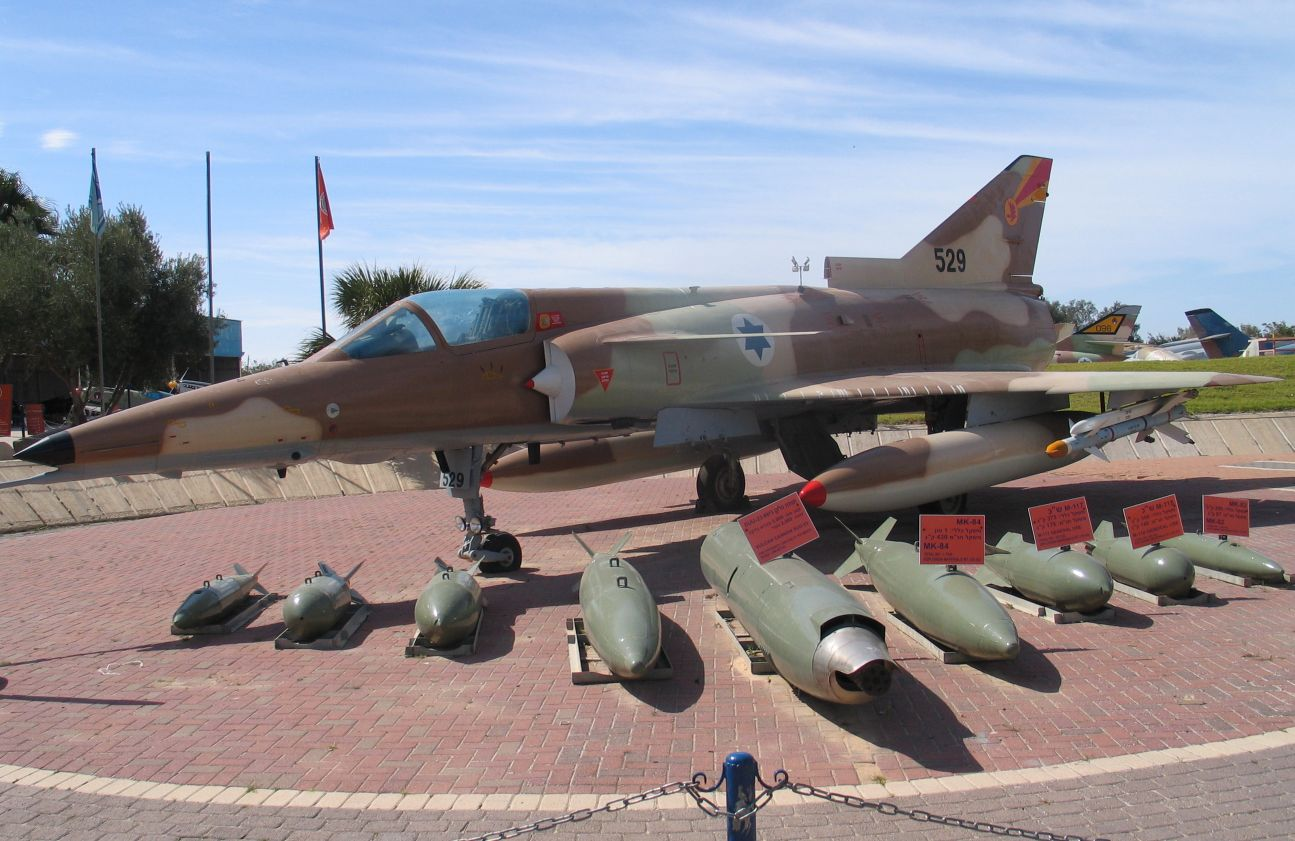
IAI Kfir

In response to the French embargo, IAI began developing its own fighter aircraft, a derivative of the Mirage 5 called the IAI Nesher ("hawk"), in 1968. The Nesher entered service in 1971, in time for the Yom Kippur War. The Nesher was followed by the IAI Kfir ("lion cub"), which was developed as a result of Israel's need for adapting the Dassault Mirage III to the specific requirements of the Israeli Air Force. The Kfir entered service with the IAF in 1975, the first units being assigned to the 101st "First Fighter" Squadron. Over the following years, several other squadrons were also equipped with the new aircraft. The Kfir's first recorded combat action took place on 9 November 1977, during an Israeli air strike on a training camp at Tel Azia, in Lebanon. The only air victory claimed by a Kfir during its service with the IAF occurred on 27 June 1979 when a Kfir C.2 shot down a Syrian MiG-21.

The IAI Kfir has been exported to Colombia, Ecuador, Sri Lanka and was leased to the US Navy and the US Marine Corps from 1985 to 1989, to act as adversary aircraft in dissimilar air combat training.

=== Diversification ===
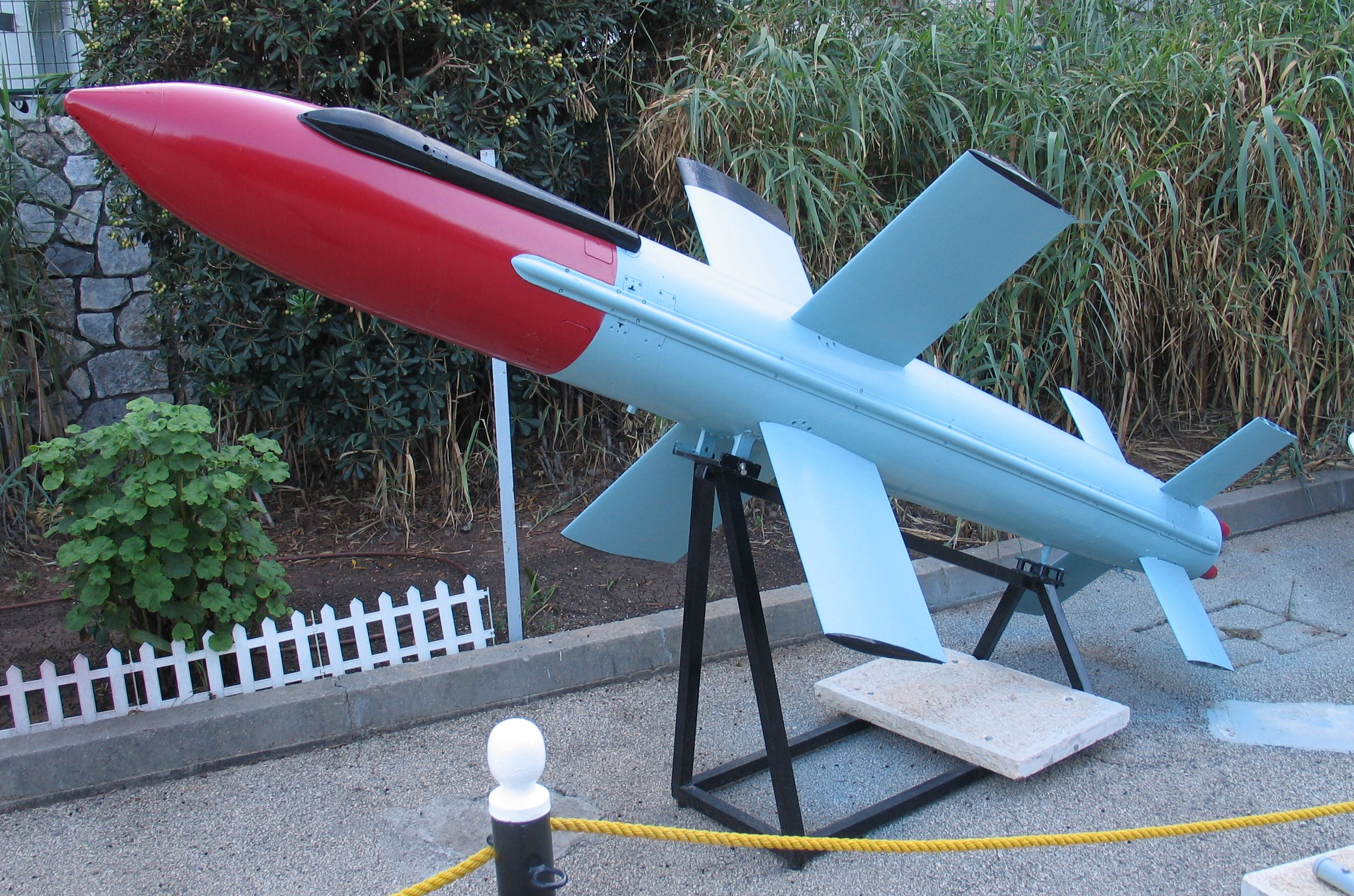
IAI Gabriel

In 1969 IAI acquired North American Rockwell's Jet Commander series of business aircraft. This became the basis for the IAI Westwind line. Work on an improved Westwind – named the Astra – began in the late 1970s by stretching the fuselage and designing a new swept wing, with the first prototype flight occurring on 19 March 1984. The first production Astra flew on 20 March 1985, FAA certification came on 29 August 1985 and customer deliveries started in 1986.

In the 1960s, IAI developed the Gabriel anti-ship missile and the Elta Electronics Industries subsidiary developed an inexpensive aircraft radar which would become a successful export item. In the 1970s IAI developed the Dabur class patrol boat.

In the 1970s IAI also entered the Unmanned aerial vehicle (UAV) market with the development of the IAI Scout. In 1984, IAI formed a joint venture with rival Israeli company Tadiran to market both companies' UAV's, the Tadiran Mastiff and the IAI Scout.

==== Developing the maintenance, repair and overhaul business ====
By 1980s the original Bedek maintenance business was conducting extensive overhauls on dozens of different aircraft types, working on engines as well as airframes and interiors, IAI could provide more comprehensive refurbishments than even the aircraft manufacturers themselves. The unit had 4,000 employees by the mid-1980s and overhauled a huge range of aircraft, from propeller-driven trainers to airliners; including big civil aviation programs, such as conversion of Boeing 747s to freighters.

=== The Lavi program ===
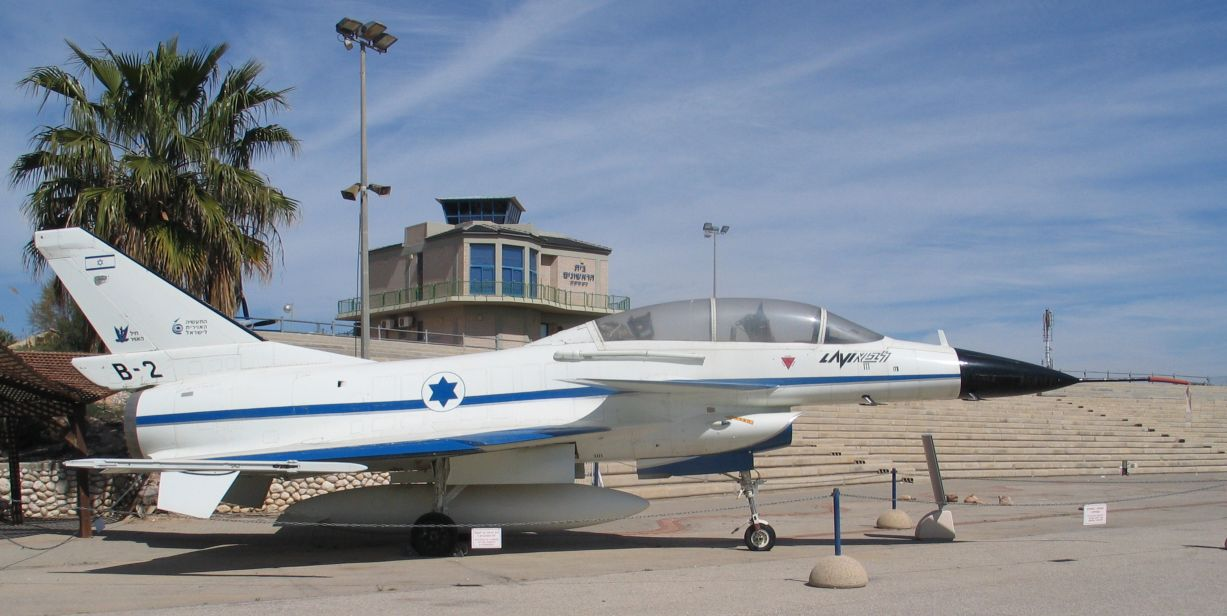
IAI Lavi

In 1980 the Government of Israel decided to use the experience IAI had accumulated to develop and manufacture a modern fighter plane to be the mainstay of the Israel Air Force. The aircraft, called the IAI Lavi, was to be a superior attack aircraft with advanced weapons systems. It had its rollout in July 1986 and successful maiden flight in December 1986.

In August 1987, after extensive government deliberations, the decision was made (by one vote) to cancel the Lavi program, due to the questioning of Israel's economic ability to support the cost of such an extensive program. This led to a serious crisis at IAI which necessitated a major reorganization of the company's structure and business strategy; the company's work force of more than 22,000 people was cut by 5,500 in 1988. However, the Lavi program was credited with developing a number of advanced technologies that IAI was able to market.

=== 1990s onwards—export led growth ===
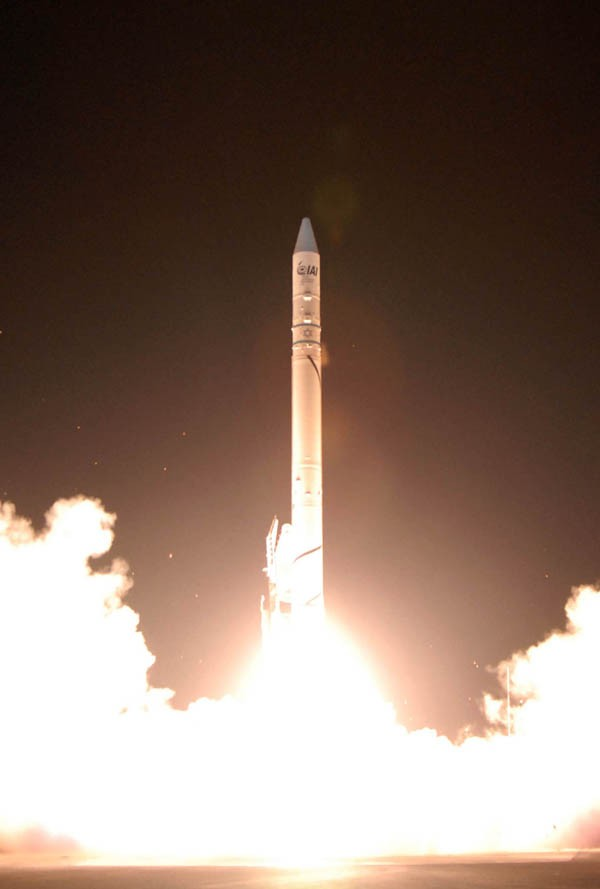
An Ofeq surveillance satellite launch utilising the Shavit space vehicle

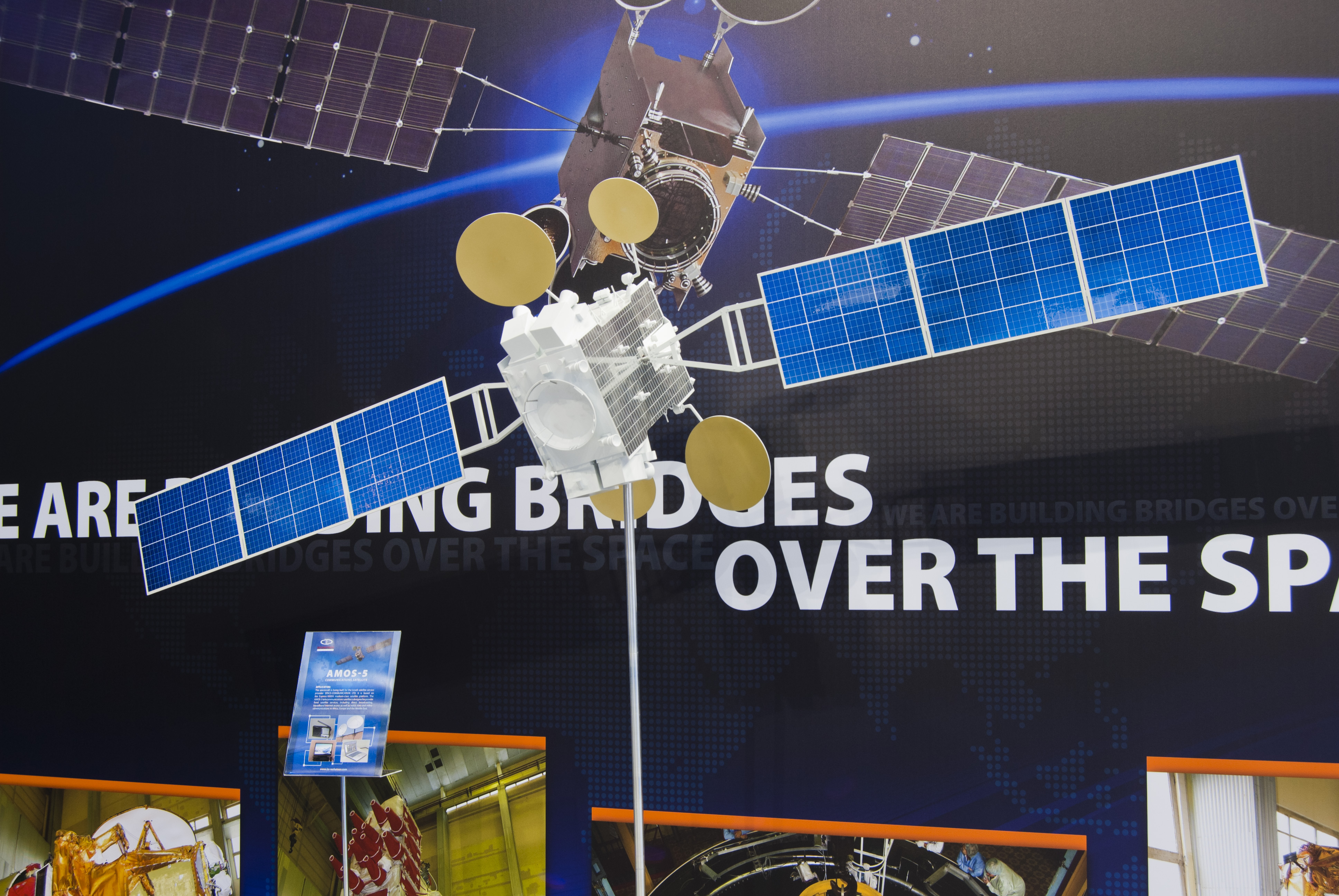
Model of an AMOS-5 satellite during "Semana de Espacio", in IFEMA, Madrid

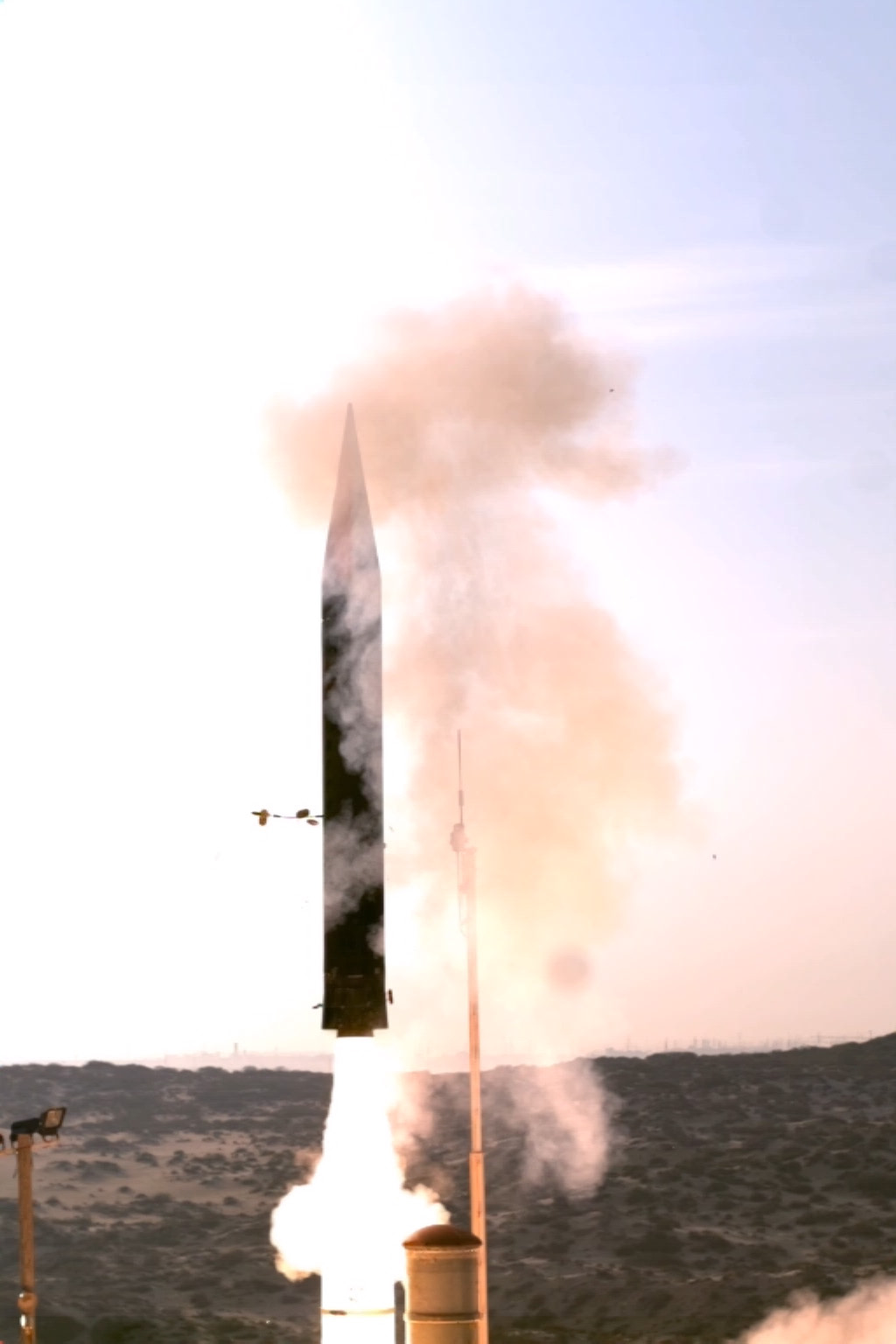
Arrow 3 missile

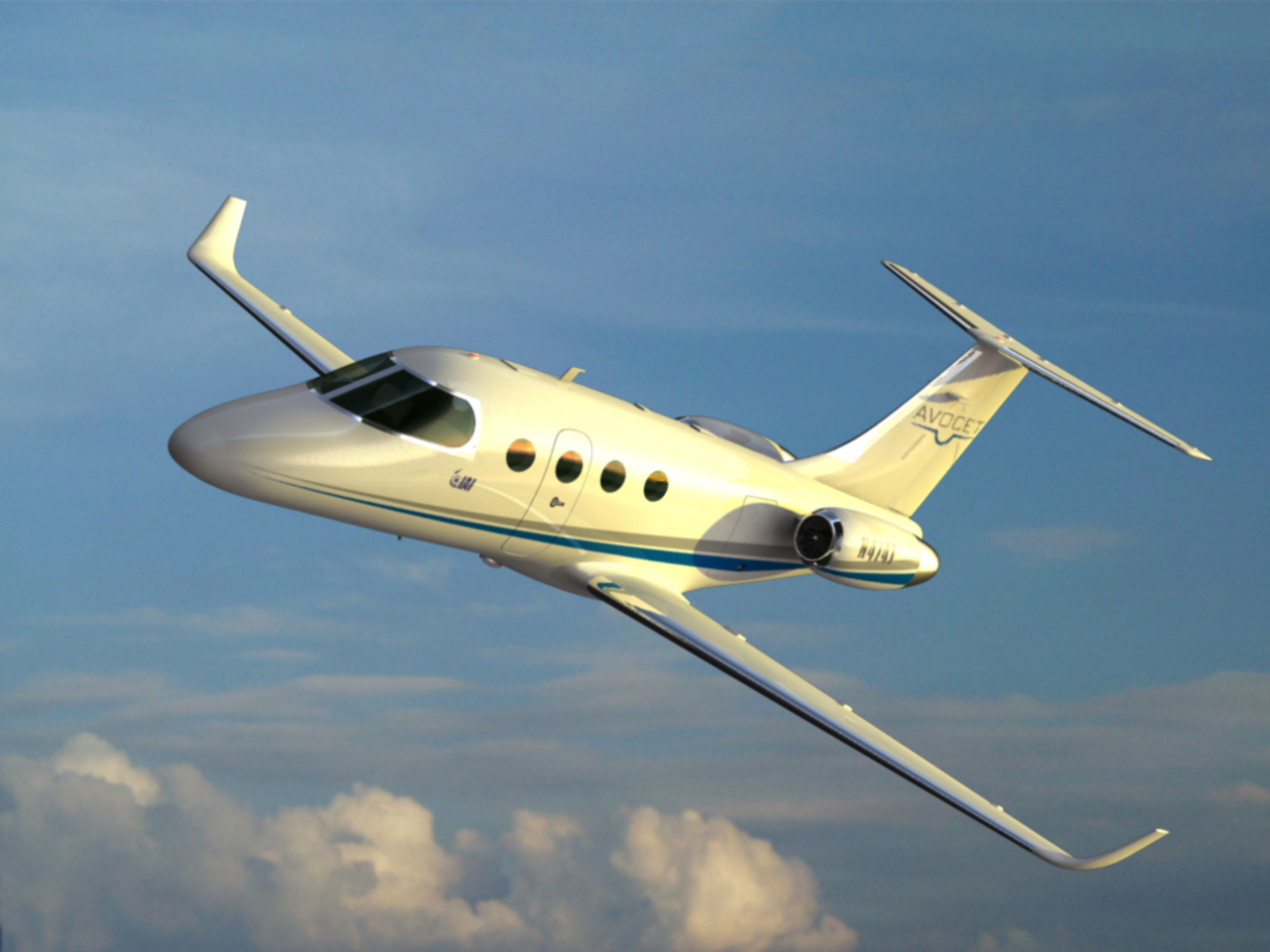
The Avocet ProJet with IAI Logo

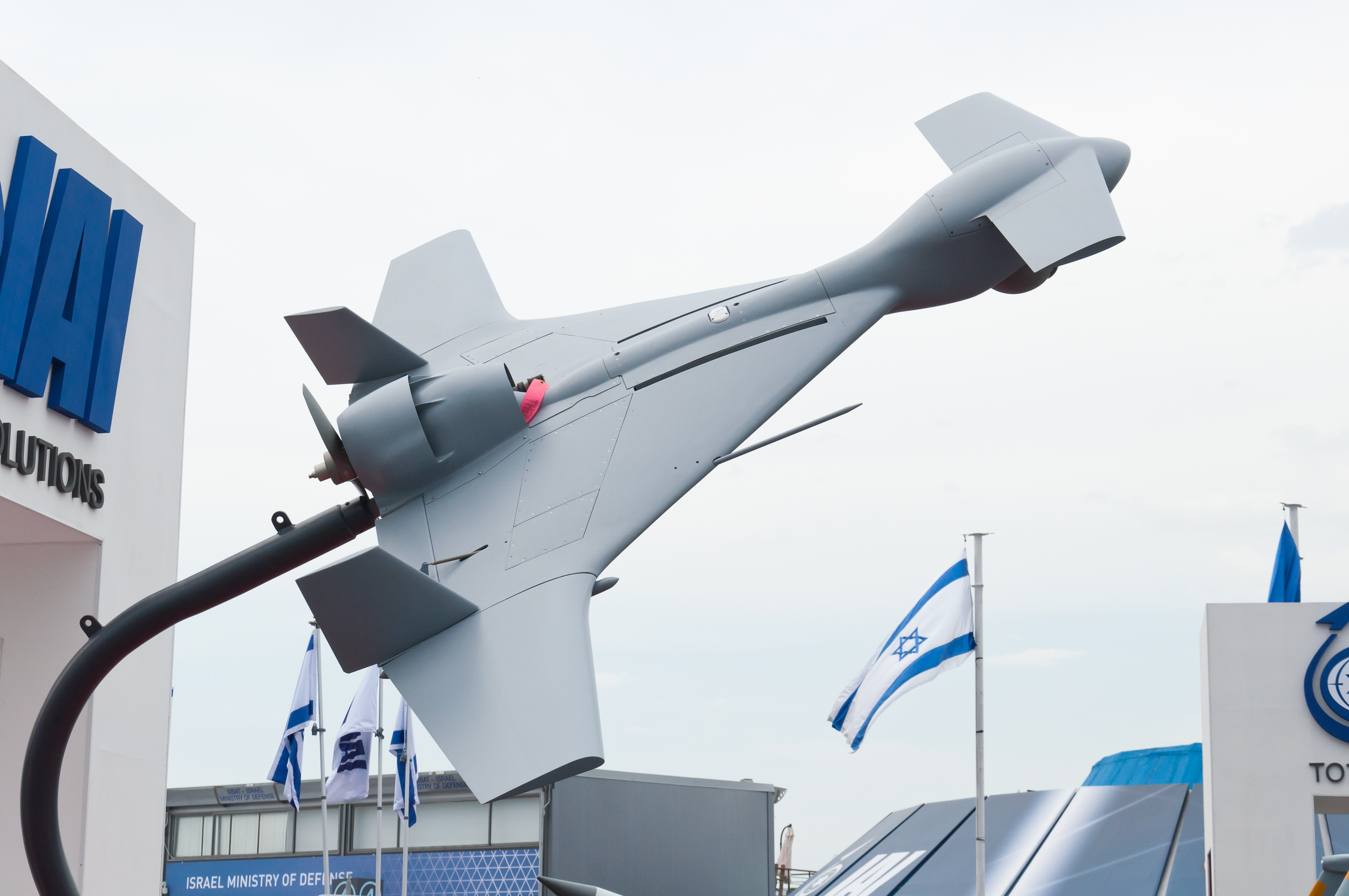
The IAI Harop loitering anti-missile drone

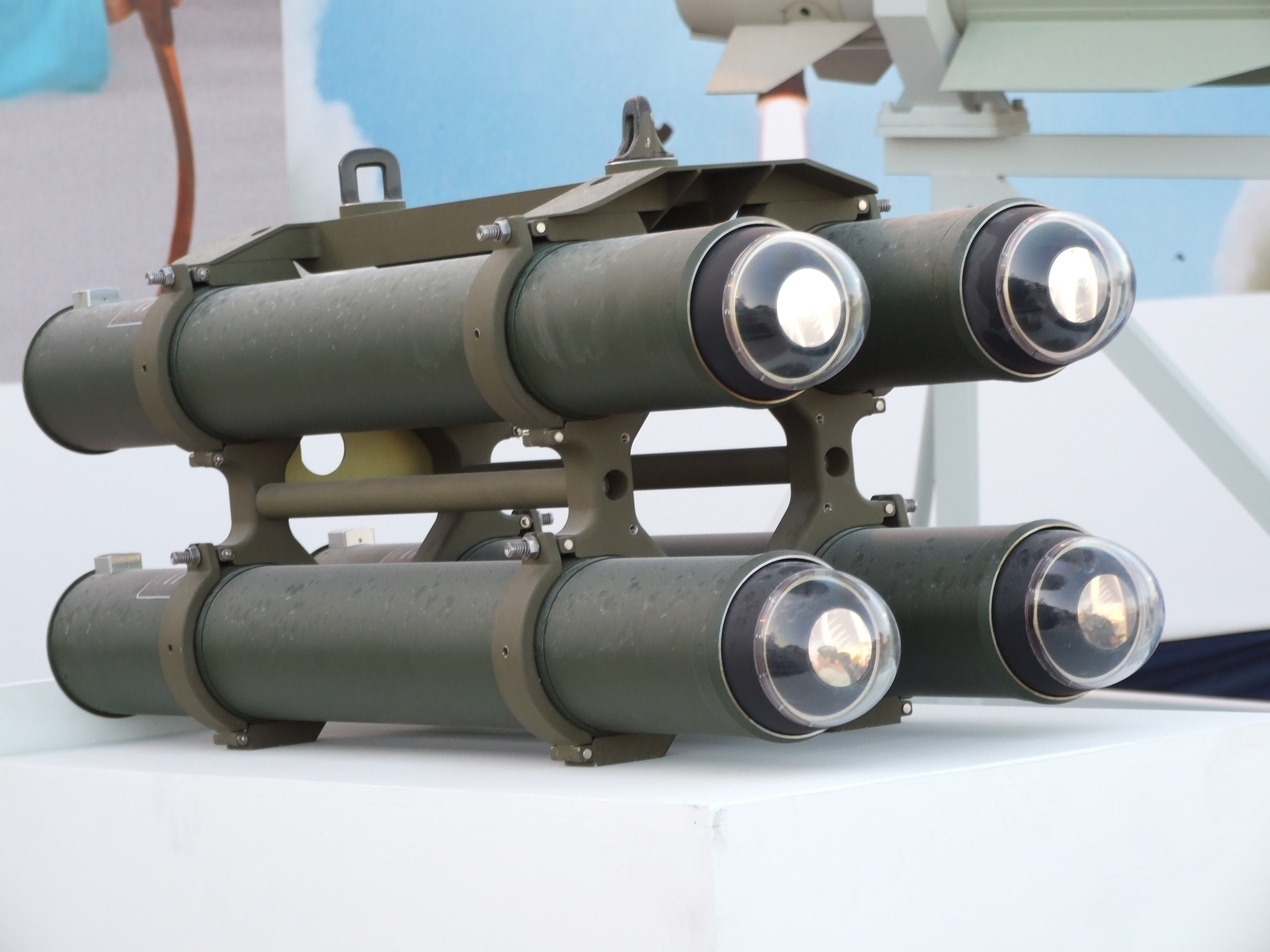
LAHAT laser-guided anti-tank missile system

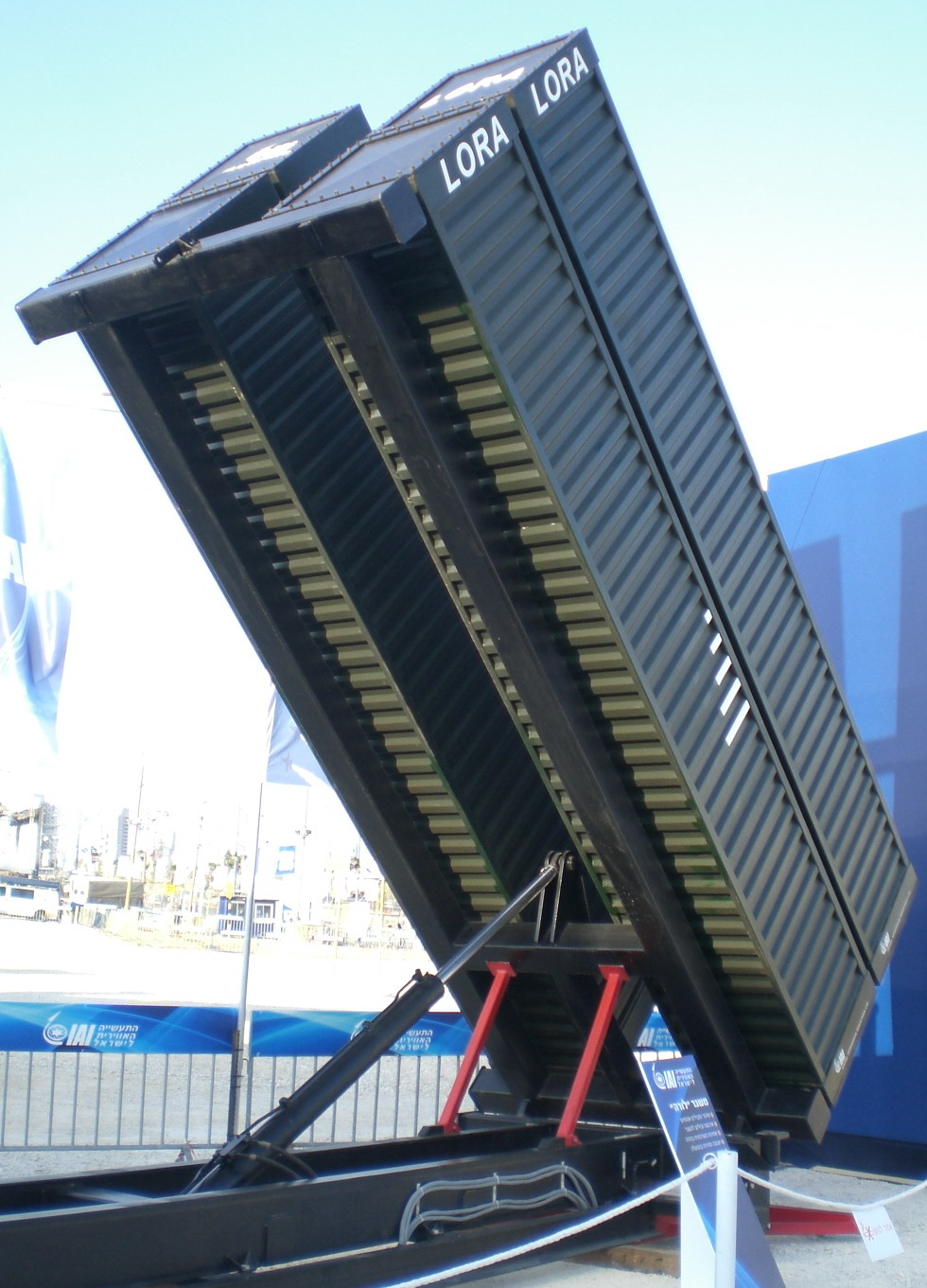
LORA tactical ballistic missile system

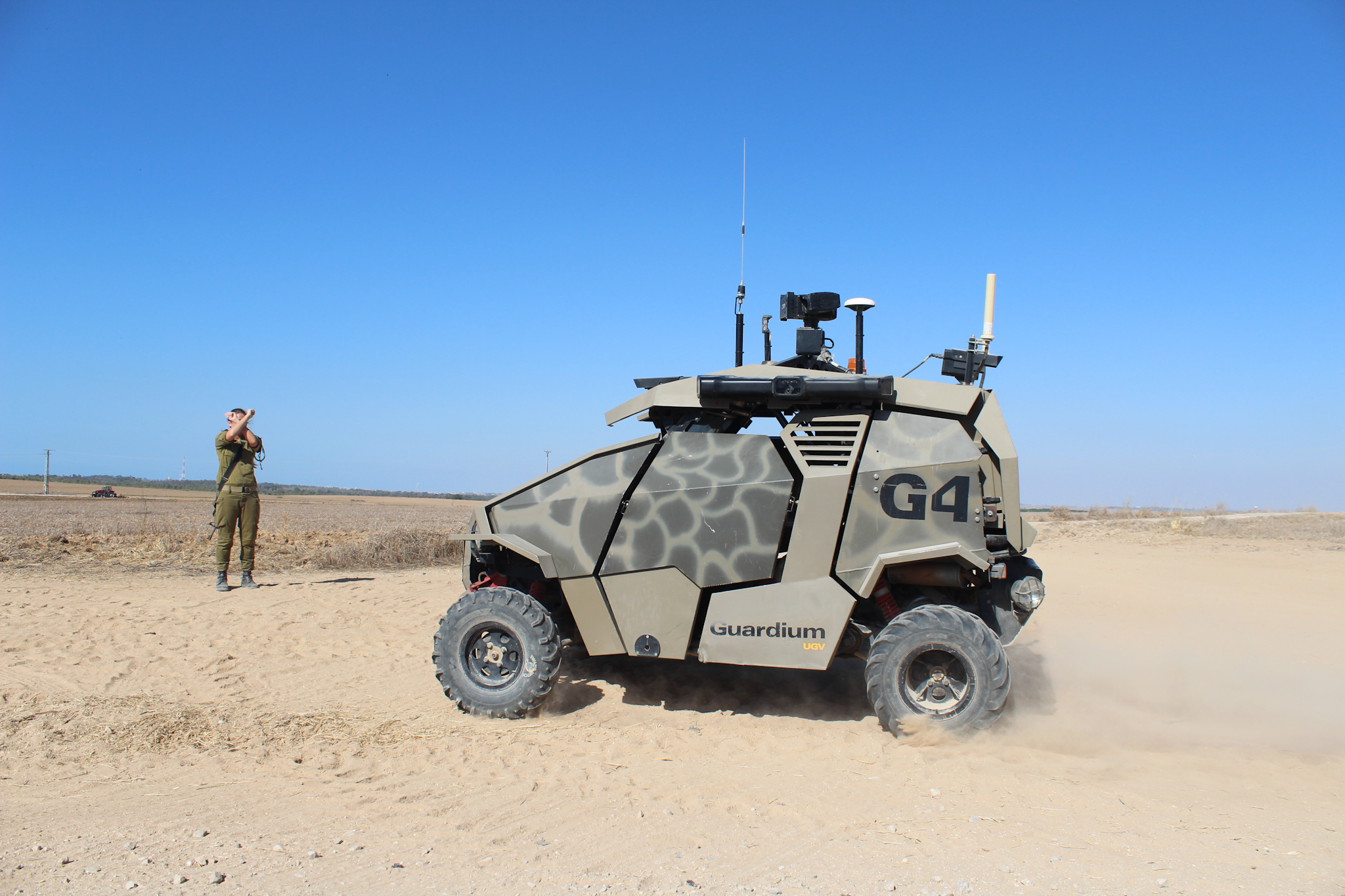
The Guardium unmanned ground vehicle

By 1989 IAI posted a profit of $11.8 million on sales of $1.28 billion. The company had four divisions—Aircraft, Aviation, Electronics, and Technologies—and 17 factories. IAI was established as a world leader in upgrading aircraft. Planes such as the Vietnam-era McDonnell Douglas F-4 Phantom II were modernized with advanced avionics and weaponry.

In the 1990s IAI entered the space race with the AMOS communications satellites, Ofeq observation satellites and the Shavit space launcher.

In December 1997, the IAI Galaxy, a business jet with an intercontinental range developed as a joint venture Galaxy Aerospace with the Hyatt Corporation, made its first flight and entered service in 2000. In May 2001, General Dynamics' Gulfstream Aerospace bought IAI's Galaxy Aerospace Co. L.P. unit for $330 million, although IAI continues to perform most of the assembly and development of the jets which are marketed by Gulfstream.

In 2003, Israel Aircraft Industries attempted to enter the VLJ (very light jet) Market by launching the Avocet ProJet, a 6–8 seat high utilization air taxi with a list price almost half the cost of the least expensive business jet available at that time. In early 2006, ProJet development stalled after a major undisclosed US OEM pulled out of the program due to unspecified reasons.

The company was working with the Aviation Technology Group on a military trainer version of the ATG Javelin, a fighter style personal jet. The version being developed would have competed against a large field of jet trainers at a much lower cost of acquisition and maintenance. ATG halted development of the Javelin in 2008 due to a lack of funds.

In March 2004 IAI signed a $1.1 billion contract with India to install three EL/W-2090 AWACS systems on Russian-made Ilyushin Il-76 transports, which are based in part on IAI's earlier EL/M-2075 Phalcon platform which was developed in the 1990s. In the late 2000s IAI developed the follow-on EL/W-2085 system which is installed on heavily modified Gulfstream G550 aircraft and which besides serving in the IAF were also sold to Singapore and Italy.

On 6 November 2006, IAI changed its corporate name from "Israel Aircraft Industries Ltd." to "Israel Aerospace Industries Ltd."; to more accurately reflect the current scope of the firm's business activities, which includes not just aircraft, but also systems, satellites and launchers, as well as maritime and ground systems.

On 13 April 2009, the Moscow Times reported that the Russian Defense Ministry had signed an agreement with Israel Aerospace to purchase $50 million in pilotless drone aircraft. The contract reportedly includes three types of UAVs manufactured by the company.

In January 2012, IAI announced a sale of $1.1 billion of defense systems to an Asian country. The deal has been signed but the company did not name the buyer. It was reported that the sale will include IAI aircraft, missiles and intelligence technologies.

On 4 September 2012, the Gulfstream G280, a new twin-engine business jet built by IAI, received full certification from the Federal Aviation Administration (FAA).

IAI is a member of the prestigious Trace International and Society of Corporate Compliance and Ethics (SCCE) organizations and recognized in the Transparency International April 2015 report to be in the top third of worldwide defense companies for its ethics and anti-corruption programs.

In April 2018, IAI systems were observed in a film made by the Azerbaijan Army, specifically the IAI Harop loitering munition system, resulting in criticism from the Armenian government concerning the supply of Israeli arms to the Azeri army. In 2019, IAI sells drone defense systems to governments to be placed in sensitive areas such as borders, army bases, or power plans, and provides equipment to shoot down military drones as well. It also sells to clients such as airports looking to protect against consumer drones. IAI in 2019 is Israel's major aerospace and defense manufacturer. It released its Popstar system in September 2019, which "can detect and track drones up to 4 km away in day or night". IAI advised customers in December 2019 not to fly some Boeing 737 freighters it had converted, after IAI said it detected an "apparent irregularity" in the production process. IAI's converted 737s had come into service in 2003.

In July 2021, IAI Aviation Group has agreed to establish a passenger to freighter conversion site to convert the B737-700/800 with Atitech (Italy) in Naples.

In October 2025, IAI signed an agreement with HAL of India to convert six used Boeing 767s to tanker aircraft.

== Products ==
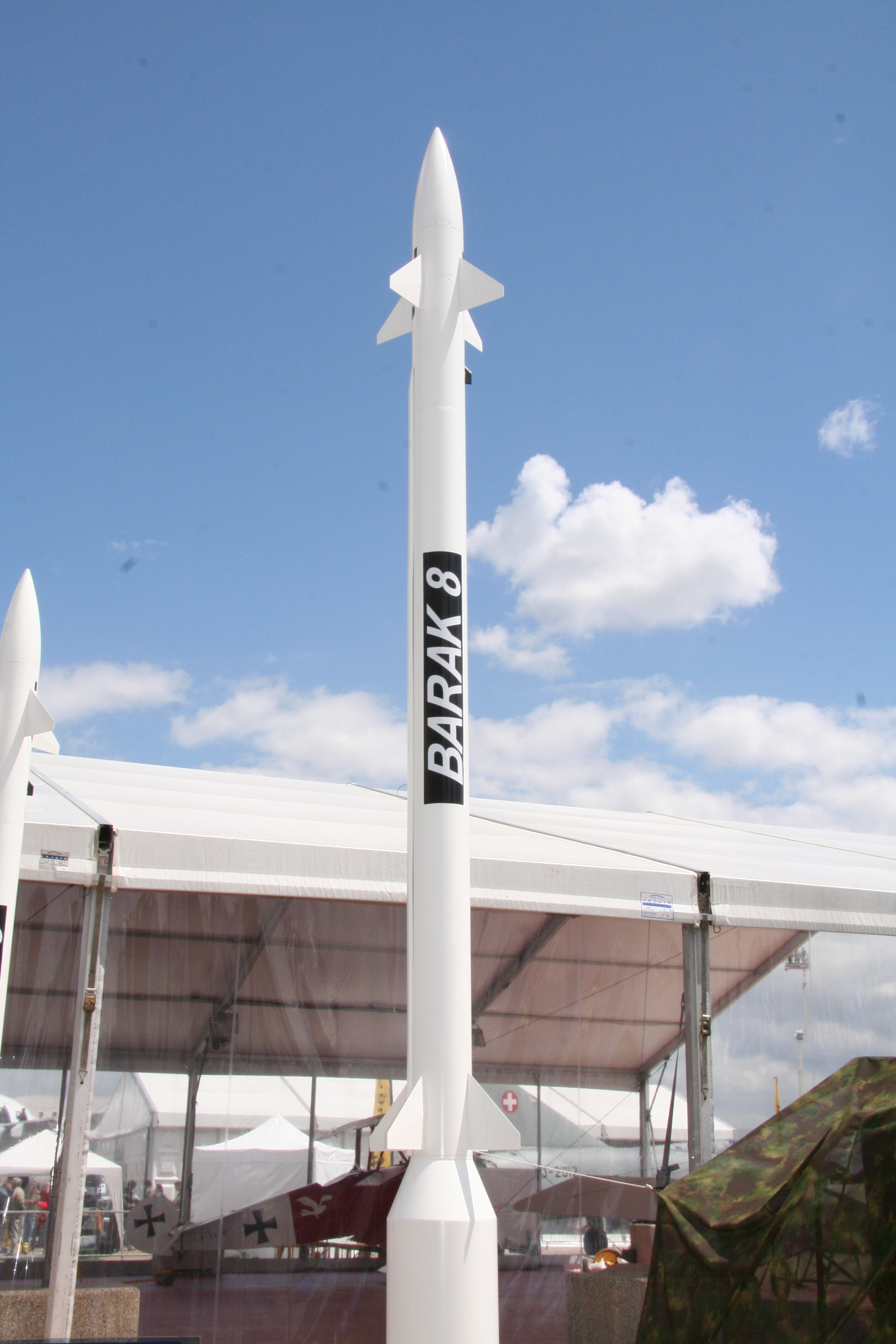
Barak 8 surface to air missile

=== Civilian aircraft produced ===
- IAI Westwind (1965–1987) :
  - 1121 Jet Commander, Certification : November 1964, Line relocated in Israël in 1969
  - 1123 Commodore Jet, Certification : December 1971, stretched, GE‐CJ610‐9 turbojets, thrust reversers, wing-tip tanks, APU
  - 1124 Westwind I, Certification : March 1976, TFE731‐3 turbofans, updated systems and avionics
  - 1124A Westwind II, Certification : April 1980, winglets, wing refinements, additional tank, upgraded avionics
- Gulfstream G100 (1985–2016)
  - 1125 Astra, Certification : August 1985, new wing, modified fuselage, updated systems and avionics
  - 1125 Astra SP, Certification : May 1990, digital avionics
  - G100 (Astra SPX), Certification : January 1996, improved engines, upgraded avionics
  - G150, Certification : November 2005, fuselage stretched and widened, new nose, new avionics, uprated engines
- Gulfstream G200 (Galaxy, 1997–2011), Certification : December 1998, new fuselage, improved engines, winglets, modified wing, upgraded avionics
- Gulfstream G280, (in production) Certification and EIS: 2011 : All new fuselage, T-Tail, Wings, engines, systems and avionics
- Arava: medium-sized STOL transport aircraft (no longer in production)
- IAI Avocet ProJet: very light jet (program cancelled in 2005)

=== Civilian air systems ===
- Conversion of passenger aircraft to cargo aircraft
  - A330-300
  - B737-300
  - B737-400
  - B737-700
  - B737-800
  - B767-200
  - B767-300
  - B747-200
  - B747-400
  - B777-300
- Flight Guard infrared countermeasures system against MANPAD anti-aircraft missiles

=== Military aircraft ===
- 377M Anak – conversions done to several ex-Pan American World Airways Boeing 377 Stratocruiser airliners into heavy lift military cargo aircraft after the United States refused the sale of the C-130 to the Israeli Air Force.
- Lavi – an Israeli fighter jet, abandoned when the United States refused to fund an F-16 competitor.
- Kfir – fighter jet, developed from the Nesher.
- Nammer – fighter jet, updated version of the Kfir.
- Nesher – fighter jet, derivative of the French Mirage 5.
- ELTA-ELI-3001 – AISIS – Airborne Integrated SIGINT System.
- CAEW Conformal Airborne Early Warning Aircraft – based on the G550 and equipped with the phalcon radar.

=== Unmanned aerial vehicles ===
- UAVs – unmanned aerial vehicles, manufactured by IAI's MALAT division:
  - Pioneer (with the USA)
  - RQ-5 Hunter (with the USA)
  - Heron family of long-endurance unmanned aerial vehicle (UAV)
  - Harpy
  - Eitan
  - I-View
  - Harop
  - Ranger
  - Scout
  - Searcher
  - Bird-Eye family of mini-UAV
  - Panther
  - Ghost

=== Military air systems ===
- Rafael Python 5 air-to-air missile (together with Rafael Advanced Defense Systems Ltd.)
- Upgrades to F-16 and F-15, and MiG-21 jet fighters
- Upgrades to Sikorsky CH-53 Yas'ur in project "Yas'ur 2000"
- Avionics upgrades for the Ka-50-2 Erdogan gunship in collaboration with Kamov
- Phalcon air surveillance system
- Eitam – adaptations of a Gulfstream G550 for airborne early warning and control
- Griffin LGB – a system for converting unguided bombs into precision-guided munitions
- SkySniper air to surface missile

=== Ground defense systems ===
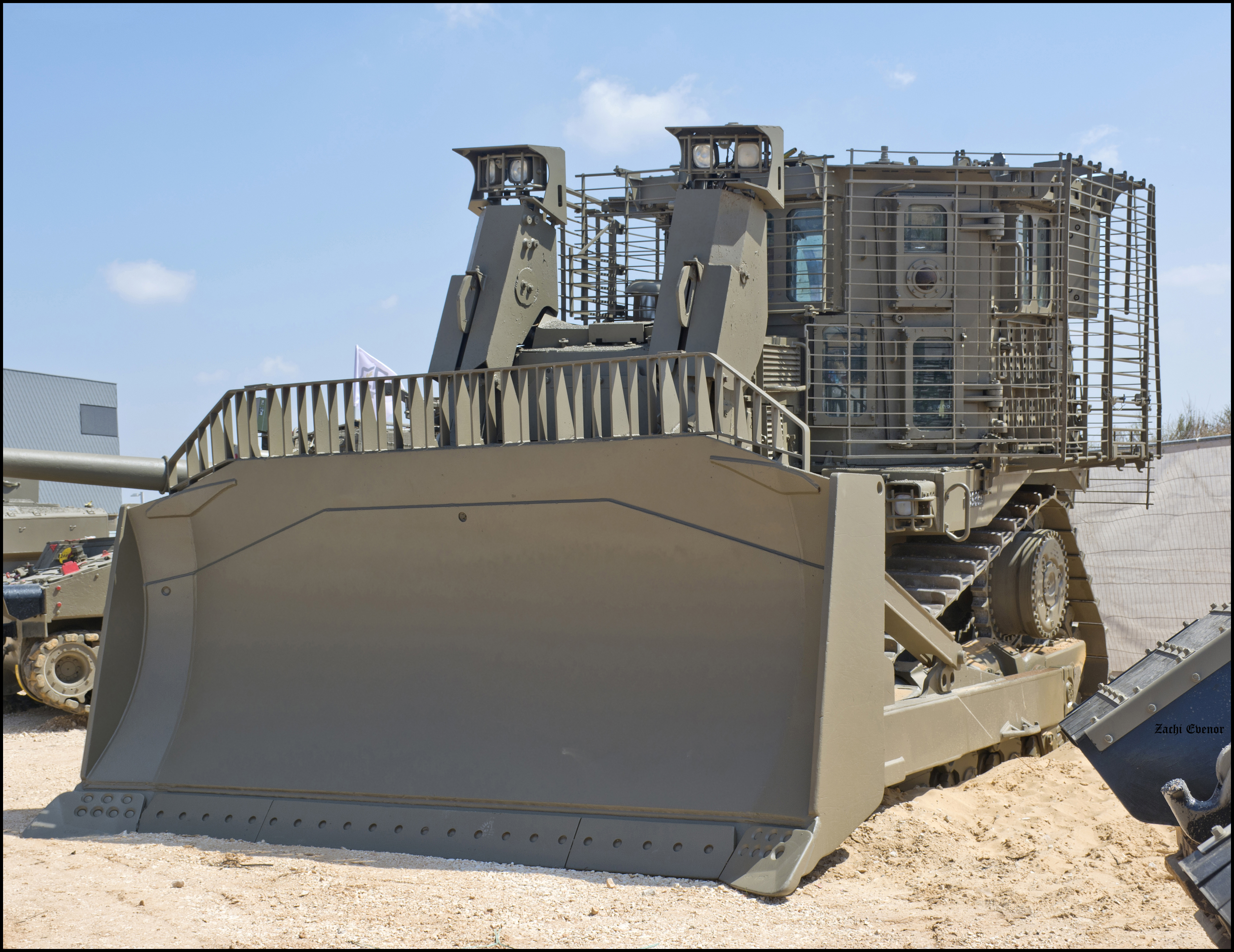
IDF Caterpillar D9 armored bulldozer

- IDF Caterpillar D9R's armor kit
- IAI JUMPER (See also XM501 Non-Line-of-Sight Launch System)
- Unmanned skid steer loader "Front Runner"
- Unmanned IDF Caterpillar D9 remote-controlled bulldozer
- AMMAD
- TopGun (artillery)
- Scorpius Electronic Warfare System

=== Ground transportation ===
- Assembly of IC3 diesel multiple unit trains and double-decker railway coaches under license from Bombardier Transportation
- Taxibot, semi-robotic towbarless pushback tractor.
- RBY MK 1
- RAM MK3

==== Creation underway ====
- Zibar
- D9T Panda

=== Unmanned ground vehicles ===
- Guardium
- Sahar – robotic engineering scout
- Robattle
- D9T Panda – unmanned version of the IDF Caterpillar D9T armored bulldozer

=== Naval systems ===
- Super Dvora Mk III class patrol boat
- Super Dvora Mk II class patrol boat
- Dvora class fast patrol boat
- Dabur class patrol boat

=== Missile systems ===
- Arrow – Anti-ballistic missile system
- Arrow 3 – Anti-ballistic missile system
- Barak 1 – Surface-to-air missile
- Barak 8 – Surface-to-air missile (jointly developed with DRDO of India)
- Gabriel – Air-to-surface, surface-to-surface anti-ship missile
- Iron Dome – mobile all-weather air-defence system
- Jericho I - Short-range ballistic missile
- Jericho II & III - Long-range ballistic missile
- LAHAT – Anti-tank missile
- LORA - Tactical ballistic missile
- Nimrod – Air-to-surface, surface-to-surface missile
- Wind Demon – Air-to-surface, low cost cruise missile

=== Space hardware ===
- AMOS (satellite bus)
  - Intelsat 24
  - AMOS-2
  - AMOS-3
  - AMOS-4
  - AMOS-6
- EROS (satellite)
  - EROS A
  - EROS B
- Ofeq Satellite series
  - Ofek-7
  - Ofek-9
  - Ofek-10
- RISAT-2 satellite
- SHALOM (satellite)
- Shavit space launcher
- Middle East Newsline has reported that IAI will launch one or more CubeSats by the end of 2008.
- TecSAR reconnaissance satellite, launched on 21 January 2008
- VENμS satellite

== Manufacturing plants ==
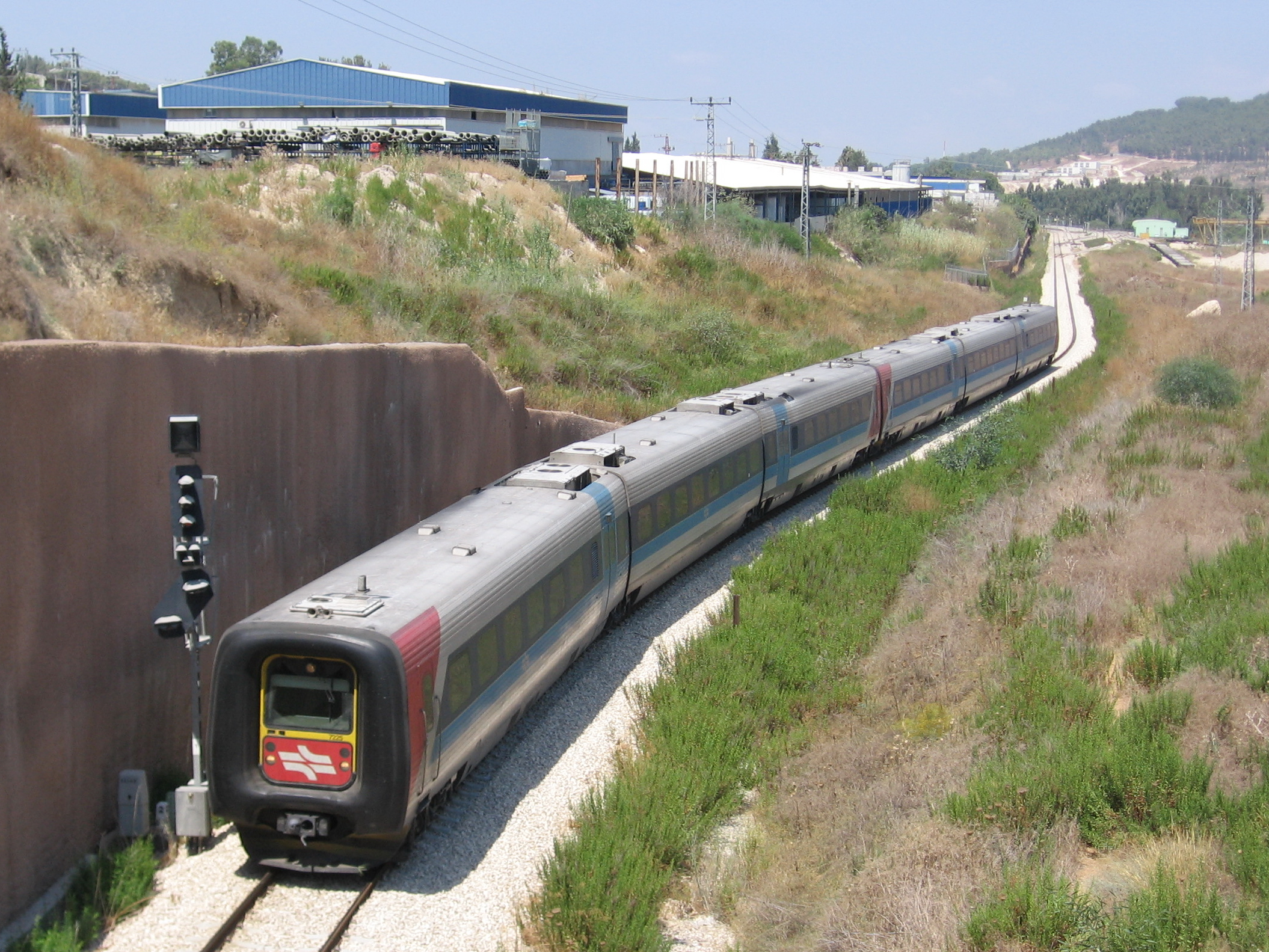
Many Israel Railways IC3 trains (one shown at Beit Shemesh, August 2006) were assembled by RAMTA from knock-down kits imported from Denmark.

- Systems, Missiles & Space Group
  - Malam – integration
  - Mabat – missiles and satellites
  - Tamam – inertial guidance and electro-optic systems
- Military Aircraft Group
  - Lahav – aircraft upgrades
  - Mata – helicopter upgrades
  - Golan Industries – crash survival seats and other aircraft parts
  - Malat – Unmanned Aerial Vehicles
- Elta – Radars, electronic warfare and ELINT
- Bedek Aviation Group – MRO
  - Aircraft Division – Conversion of passenger aircraft to cargo aircraft, heavy aircraft maintenance, Fleet Maintenance
  - Engines Division – Repair and overhaul of civil and military aircraft engines (P&W, GE)
  - Components Division – Repair and overhaul of civil and military aircraft components (APU, Landing Gear, CSD etc.).
- Commercial Aircraft Group
  - Ramta – railcars, patrol boats, armor kits for engineering vehicles etc.
  - Aerostructures
    - Shahal – landing gear and other aircraft parts
  - Technologies
  - Business Jets
- Engineering Division – aircraft manufacturing and integration
  - Maman – IT Services. mainly implementing and maintaining ERP/SAP Package.

== 2026 Partial Privatisation and IPO ==
For over two decades, the Israeli government debated the structural transformation of its defense sector, a discussion that culminated in January 2026 with a formal commitment to partially privatize Israel Aerospace Industries through an initial public offering (IPO) on the Tel Aviv Stock Exchange. This transition represents a landmark shift for the formerly state-owned enterprise. The move is designed to streamline corporate decision-making by reducing government bureaucracy while simultaneously securing the capital necessary to maintain technological parity in a competitive global market.

=== Timeline ===
The momentum for this shift grew significantly in late 2025 after a ministerial panel, chaired by Accountant General Yali Rothenberg, approved a strategic framework allowing for the sale of up to 49% of the company’s share capital.

By January 12, 2026, senior officials confirmed that the primary regulatory hurdles and complex labor union negotiations, which had historically stalled previous privatization attempts, were nearing resolution. This paved the way for a scheduled launch in the second quarter of 2026, with an initial offering of a 25% to 30% stake. To safeguard national security interests and manage market volatility, the government indicated that these shares would be released in a series of small tranches extending through 2027.

As of January 2026, IAI reached a valuation of approximately $20 billion, underpinned by an unprecedented order backlog of $26 billion. This financial surge was largely attributed to the global success of IAI’s missile defense portfolio, particularly the Arrow 3 system, which secured a record $3.5 billion export agreement with Germany in late 2025. CEO Boaz Levy has characterized the IPO as an essential "future-looking" step, arguing that private investment is the only sustainable way to fund the massive research and development required for the next generation of defense technology.

In May 2026, Israel Aerospace Industries signed a contract worth approximately US$1 billion with the Israeli Ministry of Defense for the procurement of air defense systems. The company did not disclose specific systems included in the agreement. The announcement came amid heightened regional security tensions, including the ongoing conflict involving Iran.

== See also ==
- Aeronautics Defense Systems
- Elta Systems
- Military equipment of Israel

== Bibliography ==
- Aloni, Shlomo (September–October 2003). "Golden Heritage: Israeli Aircraft Industries at 50". Air Enthusiast. No. 107. pp. 15–30. ISSN 0143-5450.
- Aloni, Shlomo. "Trainers in Combat: Valour and Sacrifice in the Six Day War". Air Enthusiast, No. 94, July/August 2001. pp. 42–55. ISSN 0143-5450
- Relman, Paul (December 1993). "IAI Astra: Israel's star-struck biz jet". Air International. Vol. 45, no. 6. pp. 313–319. ISSN 0306-5634.
