= Minotaur VI =

Space launch vehicle

- Function: Medium-lift launch vehicle
- Manufacturer: Northrop Grumman

Size
- Height: 34.49 m (113 ft 2 in)
- Diameter: 2.34 m (7 ft 8 in)
- Stages: 5 or 6

Capacity

Payload to LEO
- Altitude: 200 km (120 mi)
- Orbital inclination: 28.5°
- Mass: VI: 3,144 kg (6,931 lb); VI+: 3,360 kg (7,410 lb)

Payload to GTO
- Mass: VI+: 866 kg (1,909 lb)

Payload to TLI
- Mass: VI+: 560 kg (1,230 lb)

Payload to Mars
- Mass: VI+: 300 kg (660 lb)

Associated rockets
- Family: Minotaur
- Based on: LGM-118 Peacekeeper; Minotaur IV+
- Comparable: Delta II, Long March 2D

Launch history
- Status: Proposed

First stage – SR-118
- Maximum thrust: 2,224 kN (500,000 lb_{f})
- Specific impulse: 229 s (2.25 km/s)
- Burn time: 56.6 seconds
- Propellant: HTPB

Second stage – SR-118
- Maximum thrust: 2,224 kN (500,000 lb_{f})
- Specific impulse: 229 s (2.25 km/s)
- Burn time: 56.6 seconds
- Propellant: HTPB

Third stage – SR-119
- Maximum thrust: 1,223 kN (275,000 lb_{f})
- Specific impulse: 308 s (3.02 km/s)
- Burn time: 61 seconds
- Propellant: HTPB

Fourth stage – SR-120
- Maximum thrust: 289 kN (65,000 lb_{f})
- Specific impulse: 300 s (2.9 km/s)
- Burn time: 72 seconds
- Propellant: NEPE

Fifth stage – Star 48BV
- Maximum thrust: 68.6 kN (15,400 lb_{f})
- Specific impulse: 288 s (2.82 km/s)
- Burn time: 84.1 seconds
- Propellant: HTPB

Sixth stage (Minotaur VI+) – Star 37
- Maximum thrust: 47.26 kN (10,620 lb_{f})
- Specific impulse: 289.8 s (2.842 km/s)
- Burn time: 63 seconds
- Propellant: HTPB

Minotaur VI is a proposed medium-lift launch vehicle derived from the LGM-118 Peacekeeper, an intercontinental ballistic missile (ICBM). It is a member of the Minotaur rocket family and a higher-performance derivative of the Minotaur IV. The base Minotaur VI consists of a Minotaur IV+ rocket with an additional SR118 first stage motor for improved performance. Minotaur VI is optimized for low Earth orbit (LEO) missions, and can send 3,144 kilograms (6,931 lb) to such an orbit. The Minotaur VI+ variant, however, features a Star 37FM sixth stage and is primarily intended for higher-energy missions.

The Minotaur VI and VI+ rockets are capable of launching from LP-1 at the Pacific Spaceport Complex – Alaska as well as SLC-46 at Cape Canaveral Space Force Station. Other Minotaur launch complexes, including Vandenberg Space Launch Complex 8 and MARS LP-0B, are unable to launch the vehicle without modifications because of limited integration tower height.

As of May 2024, no Minotaur VI launches have been performed and none are currently scheduled.

== Description ==
Minotaur VI was developed by Orbital Sciences (now owned by Northrop Grumman). Minotaur VI would be used for low Earth orbit and Sun-synchronous orbit missions. Minotaur VI+ is also available for high-energy trajectories such as geostationary transfer orbit or trans-lunar injection thanks to an additional sixth stage motor.

The Minotaur IV family (which includes Minotaur VI) is derived from the LGM-118 Peacekeeper intercontinental ballistic missile (ICBM), deployed from 1985 until 2005. The Minotaur VI utilizes decommissioned Peacekeeper solid rocket motors, which compose the first three stages in all Minotaur IV rockets and derivatives. This relatively simple architecture allows Minotaur to be launched from essentially anywhere in the US through the use of mobile launch facilities - although this capability has never been needed. Because of its use of decommissioned ICBM components, Minotaur VI can only be used to launch US government missions.

Two payload fairing options are available for Minotaur VI. The standard fairing, which has so far flown on every Minotaur IV and V rocket, has a 92 inches (2,300 mm) diameter and is composed of graphite epoxy sheets with an aluminum honeycomb core. The fairing features one payload access door, although more can be added if requested by a customer. The 92-inch fairing was originally developed for the Taurus rocket. A second fairing option with a 110 inches (2,800 mm) diameter is offered for larger payloads.

On the Minotaur VI+, the Star 37 sixth stage is contained within the fairing.

=== Minotaur VI ===
The standard Minotaur VI rocket is composed of five stages. The first and second stage SR118 motors provide 2,224 kilonewtons (500,000 lb_{f}) of thrust during their back-to-back 56.6-second burns, followed by stage separation and third-stage ignition. The third stage, powered by an SR119 motor, burns for 61 seconds and provides an average thrust of 1,223 kilonewtons (275,000 lb_{f}). The fourth stage then burns for 72 seconds, with an average thrust of 289 kilonewtons (65,000 lb_{f}). The initial four stages all have thrust vector control, allowing them to steer the rocket downrange by gimballing the motor nozzles. The third and fourth stages also feature extendable nozzles, allowing for improved performance in the upper portions of Earth's atmosphere as well as the vacuum of space.

The Star 48BV fifth stage burns for 85.2 seconds with an average thrust of 68.63 kilonewtons (15,430 lb_{f}) and also features thrust vectoring, which is uncommon for Star 48 motors. The Star 48 motor has also seen use on the Atlas V, Delta IV, and Space Shuttle, alongside over 70 missions on the Delta II.

Minotaur VI is primarily intended for low Earth orbit missions, with a rated capacity of 3,144 kilograms (6,931 lb) to LEO and 2,400 kilograms (5,300 lb) to SSO.

=== Minotaur VI+ ===
The Minotaur VI+ builds off the standard Minotaur VI by incorporating a Star 37FM sixth stage. This allows the VI+ variant to either send additional payload to LEO (up to 3,360 kilograms (7,410 lb)) or send smaller payloads onto higher-energy trajectories. The Star 37FM can fly either in a spin-stabilized configuration or in a three-axis controlled variant, although some performance is sacrificed on the latter configuration.

Minotaur VI+ can send up to 866 kilograms (1,909 lb) to geostationary transfer orbit, 560 kilograms (1,230 lb) to trans-lunar injection, and 300 kilograms (660 lb) to a trans-Mars injection.

== See also ==
- Comparison of orbital launchers families
- Comparison of orbital launch systems
- Minotaur IV
- Minotaur V
