= USA-221 =

Satellite launched in 2010

- Mission type: Technology
- Operator: USAFA
- COSPAR ID: 2010-062E
- SATCAT no.: 37226

Spacecraft properties
- Launch mass: 180 kilograms (400 lb)

Start of mission
- Launch date: 20 November 2010, 01:25:00 UTC
- Rocket: Minotaur IV/HAPS F3
- Launch site: Kodiak LP-1

Orbital parameters
- Reference system: Geocentric
- Regime: Low Earth
- Perigee altitude: 633 kilometres (393 mi)
- Apogee altitude: 654 kilometres (406 mi)
- Inclination: 71.90 degrees
- Period: 97.60 minutes
- Epoch: 20 November 2010

USA-221, also known as FalconSat-5, is an American military minisatellite, which was launched in 2010. The fifth FalconSat spacecraft to be launched, it carries four technology development and ionospheric research experiments. The satellite was constructed and is operated by the United States Air Force Academy.

== Spacecraft ==
USA-221 is a 180-kilogram (400 lb) spacecraft, measuring 70 centimetres (28 in) by 64 centimetres (25 in) by 54 centimetres (21 in). It operates in a low Earth orbit with an apogee of 654 kilometres (406 mi), a perigee of 633 kilometres (393 mi), and 72 degrees of orbital inclination.

The Space Plasma Characterization Source (SPCS) studies how a cold gas ammonia thruster and a Hall effect thruster behave in space, and how they affect the spacecraft's surroundings. Meanwhile, the Wafer-Integrated Spectrometer, WISPERS, will observe the plume generated by the Hall thruster, allowing a comparison to be made to theoretical data. The other two experiments will study the Earth's ionosphere. SmartMESA, the Smart Miniaturized Electrostatic Analyzer, was designed to record the ion density of the ionosphere, as well as the temperature, to allow a study of how temperature affects ion density. It is a reflight of the original SmartMESA mission, which was lost when FalconSat-2 failed to achieve orbit. The Receiver UHF/VHF Signal Strength, or RUSS, experiment, is intended to receive radio signals in the UHF and VHF bands, to determine the levels and effects of ionospheric interference.

SmartMESA, also known as the Integrated Miniaturized ElectroStatic Analyzer, and WISPERS were respectively ranked as the 26th and 31st most important experiments for DoD satellites in 2006, by the US Space Experiments Review Board.

== Launch ==
USA-221 was launched from Pad 1 of the Kodiak Launch Complex, using a Minotaur IV carrier rocket with a HAPS upper stage; however USA-221 was deployed prior to ignition of the HAPS stage. The Minotaur was launched at 01:25:00 UTC on 20 November 2010, with FalconSat-5 separating into its low Earth orbit just over 25 minutes later.

The launch also carried STPSat-2, FASTSAT and NanoSail-D2, FASTRAC, O/OREOS, and RAX. Collectively, the deployment mission was designated STP-S26, and marked the third flight of the Minotaur IV.
