= Minotaur III =

- Function: Heavy suborbital launch system
- Manufacturer: Orbital Sciences
- Country of origin: United States

Size
- Stages: Four

Capacity

Payload to 5000km S/O
- Mass: 3,000 kilograms (6,600 lb)

Launch history
- Status: Canceled
- Launch sites: Kodiak Island, LP-1; Vandenberg, SLC-8
- Total launches: 0

First stage – SR-118
- Powered by: 1 Solid
- Maximum thrust: 2,224 kilonewtons (500,000 lb_{f})
- Specific impulse: 229 s (2.25 km/s) (sea level)
- Burn time: 56.6 seconds
- Propellant: HTPB

Second stage – SR-119
- Powered by: 1 Solid
- Maximum thrust: 1,223 kilonewtons (275,000 lb_{f})
- Specific impulse: 308 s (3.02 km/s)
- Burn time: 61 seconds
- Propellant: HTPB

Third stage – SR-120
- Powered by: 1 Solid
- Maximum thrust: 289 kilonewtons (65,000 lb_{f})
- Specific impulse: 300 s (2.9 km/s)
- Burn time: 72 seconds
- Propellant: NEPE

Fourth stage – Super-HAPS
- Powered by: 12 MR-107K
- Propellant: Hydrazine

The Minotaur III, also known as OSP-2 Target Launch Vehicle, Peacekeeper TLV, or OSP-2 TLV was an American rocket concept derived from the LGM-118 Peacekeeper missile. It was a member of the Minotaur family of rockets produced by Orbital Sciences Corporation (now part of Northrop Grumman) and would have been used for long-range suborbital launches with heavy payloads. The Minotaur III was to be capable of launching 3,000 kilograms (6,600 lb) of payload 5,000 kilometres (3,100 mi) downrange. This role has been taken over by the near-identical Minotaur IV Lite and the lighter-lift Minotaur II.

Minotaur III launches would have been conducted from Vandenberg Space Force Base in California and the Kodiak Launch Complex in Alaska.

== Description ==
Minotaur III was planned to be a four-stage launch vehicle, essentially made up of a Peacekeeper missile with a Super-HAPS fourth stage, along with the Orbital-designed avionics package featured on Minotaur rockets. The first stage would have been an SR118 motor burning for 56.6 seconds, followed by the SR119 second stage motor burning for 61 seconds. The first and second stages would have average thrusts of 2,224 kilonewtons (500,000 lb_{f}) and 1,223 kilonewtons (275,000 lb_{f}), respectively. The third stage S120 motor would then burn with an average thrust of 289 kilonewtons (65,000 lb_{f}) for 72 seconds, sending the payload and Super-HAPS on their final suborbital trajectory. The first three stages would feature thrust vector control to maneuver and steer the rocket.

Super-HAPS would then be used for final payload maneuvering and guidance, allowing Minotaur to provide high precision for the payload's landing or re-entry location. Super-HAPS would have been a larger and more capable variant of the monopropellant Hydrazine Auxiliary Propulsion System (HAPS), which was developed as a final maneuvering stage for the Pegasus rocket and later flown on the Minotaur I and Minotaur IV rockets. HAPS features three MR-107K thrusters, whereas Super-HAPS would have had 12.

The Minotaur III has never flown, and as of 2024, the vehicle is no longer mentioned in Minotaur-related documents and is most likely canceled. Its role was filled by the similar Minotaur IV Lite, which sports a larger fairing and no fourth stage and can send 3,000 kilograms (6,600 lb) of payload (the same as Minotaur III) 1,600 kilometres (990 mi) further downrange. The Minotaur II is also available for smaller payloads, such as intercept test targets.
