= Minotaur V =

American expendable launch system

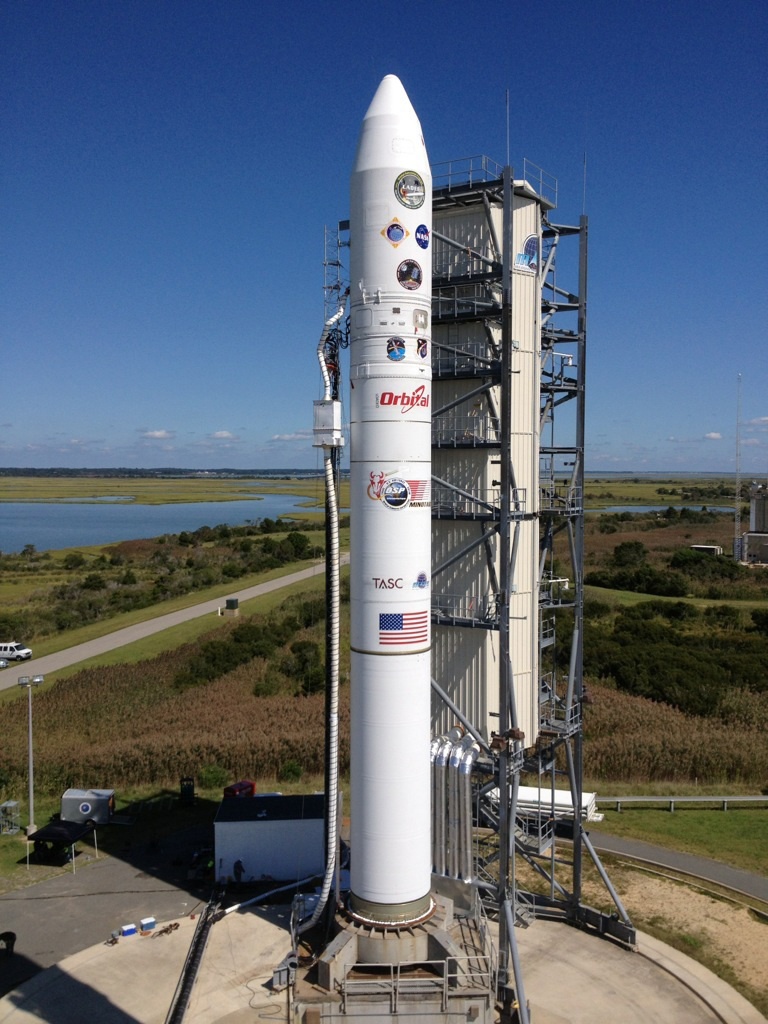
- The Minotaur V at LP-0B before the launch of LADEE
- Function: Small-lift launch vehicle
- Manufacturer: Orbital Sciences (2013–2015); Orbital ATK (2015–2018); Northrop Grumman (2018–present)
- Country of origin: United States
- Cost per launch: $46 million (2010)

Size
- Height: 24.56 m (80.6 ft)
- Diameter: 2.34 m (7 ft 8 in)
- Mass: 89,373 kg (197,034 lb)
- Stages: 5

Capacity

Payload to MTO
- Mass: 650 kg (1,430 lb)

Payload to GTO
- Mass: 532 kg (1,173 lb)

Payload to TLI
- Mass: 342 kg (754 lb)

Associated rockets
- Family: Minotaur
- Based on: LGM-118 Peacekeeper; Minotaur IV+

Launch history
- Status: Active, no planned launches
- Launch sites: Wallops Island, LP‑0B
- Total launches: 1
- Success(es): 1
- First flight: September 7, 2013

First stage – SR-118
- Maximum thrust: 2,224 kN (500,000 lb_{f})
- Specific impulse: 229 s (2.25 km/s)
- Burn time: 56.6 seconds
- Propellant: HTPB

Second stage – SR-119
- Maximum thrust: 1,223 kN (275,000 lb_{f})
- Specific impulse: 308 s (3.02 km/s)
- Burn time: 61 seconds
- Propellant: HTPB

Third stage – SR-120
- Maximum thrust: 289 kN (65,000 lb_{f})
- Specific impulse: 300 s (2.9 km/s)
- Burn time: 72 seconds
- Propellant: NEPE

Fourth stage – Star 48BV
- Maximum thrust: 68.6 kN (15,400 lb_{f})
- Specific impulse: 288 s (2.82 km/s)
- Burn time: 84.1 seconds
- Propellant: HTPB

Fifth stage – Star 37FM/FMV
- Maximum thrust: FM: 54.8 kN (12,300 lb_{f}); FMV: 55.6 kN (12,500 lb_{f})
- Specific impulse: FM: 290 s (2.8 km/s); FMV: 294 s (2.88 km/s)
- Burn time: 62.7 seconds
- Propellant: HTPB

Minotaur V is a small-lift launch vehicle repurposed from the retired LGM-118 Peacekeeper, an intercontinental ballistic missile (ICBM). Minotaur V was developed by Orbital Sciences Corporation (now absorbed into Northrop Grumman) and made its maiden, and to date only, flight on September 7, 2013, carrying the LADEE (Lunar Atmosphere and Dust Environment Explorer) spacecraft for NASA. Although Minotaur V is still offered for launch services, no further flights are scheduled as of 2026.

== Design ==
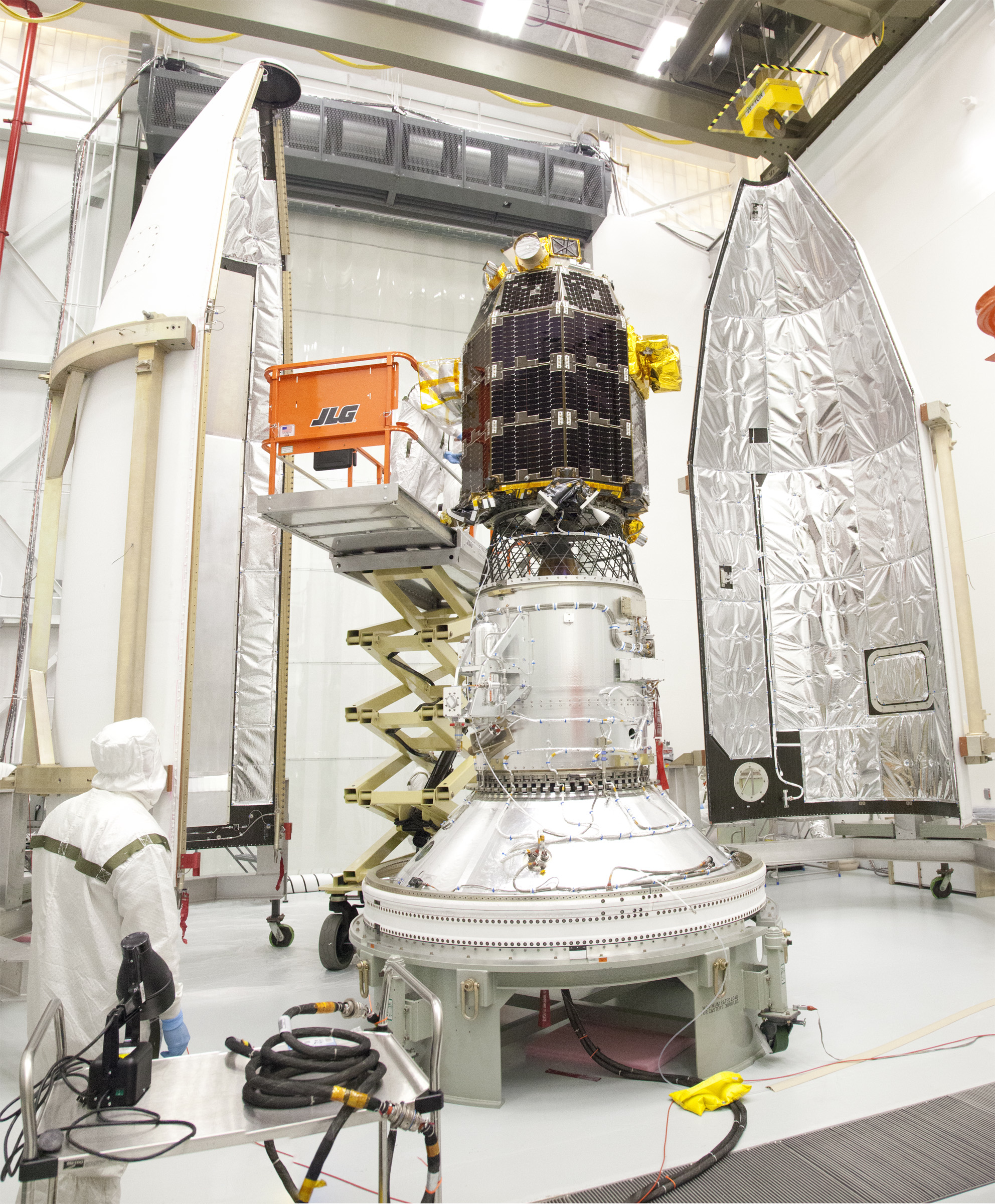
LADEE prepared for fairing encapsulation ahead of its launch in 2013. The Star 37FM fifth stage is visible as the silver cylinder directly below the spacecraft.

Minotaur V is a five-stage launch vehicle designed by Orbital Sciences (now owned by Northrop Grumman) to place up to 630 kilograms (1,390 lb) of payload into a geosynchronous transfer orbit or 342 kilograms (754 lb) on a trans-lunar trajectory. It is derived from the Minotaur IV rocket and is essentially a Minotaur IV+ with an added fifth stage to improve performance to highly-elliptical orbits.

Minotaur V's first stage SR118 motor provides 2,224 kilonewtons (500,000 lb_{f}) of thrust during its 56.6-second burn, followed immediately after by stage separation and second-stage ignition. The second stage, powered by an SR119 motor, burns for 61 seconds and provides an average thrust of 1,223 kilonewtons (275,000 lb_{f}). The third stage then burns for 72 seconds, with an average thrust of 289 kilonewtons (65,000 lb_{f}). After third stage shutdown and separation, the vehicle coasts before igniting the Star 48BV fourth stage. The first four stages all have thrust vector control, allowing them to steer the rocket downrange by gimballing the motor nozzles. The second and third stages also feature extendable nozzles, allowing for improved performance in the upper portions of Earth's atmosphere as well as the vacuum of space.

The fifth stage consists of a Star 37 motor, which burns for 62.7 seconds and is responsible for deploying the payload into its final orbit. Two variants are available, one with a 60 RPM spin-stabilized Star-37FM upper stage, and the other with a Star-37FMV capable of three-axis stabilization. The Star-37FMV upper stage is heavier than the FM variant by 22 kilograms (49 lb), reducing payload capacity, but can allow for finer control. The FMV variant also notably features a larger nozzle than the FM, providing slightly higher thrust and specific impulse.

The first 3 stages make up the majority of the rocket's body, while the smaller fourth stage is housed in a hollow cylindrical structure referred to as the "Guidance and Control Assembly skirt" (GCA skirt). The fifth stage is housed within the payload fairing, sitting atop an adaptor to the fourth stage below it.

Minotaur V uses the same standard 92 in (2.3 m)-diameter carbon-composite payload fairing as the other Minotaur IV variants. A larger 110 in (2.8 m)-diameter composite fairing is also available for larger payloads. To date, no Minotaur rockets have flown with the larger fairing option.

== Launch pads ==
Space Launch Complex 8 at the Vandenberg Space Force Base, Pad 0B at the Mid-Atlantic Regional Spaceport (MARS), and Pad 1 of the Kodiak Launch Complex are all capable of accommodating Minotaur V. As of 2026, the vehicle has only launched from MARS.

== Launch history ==
The only Minotaur V launch occurred on September 7, 2013, at 03:27 UTC from Launch Pad 0B at the Mid-Atlantic Regional Spaceport in Virginia. The payload for the maiden flight was the LADEE lunar exoatmosphere science spacecraft (SATCAT: 39246, decay date: April 18, 2014). While now separated from the LADEE spacecraft, both the fourth and fifth stages of the Minotaur V reached orbit, and became derelict satellites in Earth orbit (SATCAT: 39248, decay date: November 27, 2013).

Flight	Date (UTC)	Launch site	Payload	Orbit	Outcome
1	September 7, 2013, 03:27	Wallops Island, LP‑0B	LADEE	LTO	Success
