= Minotaur IV =

Space launch vehicle

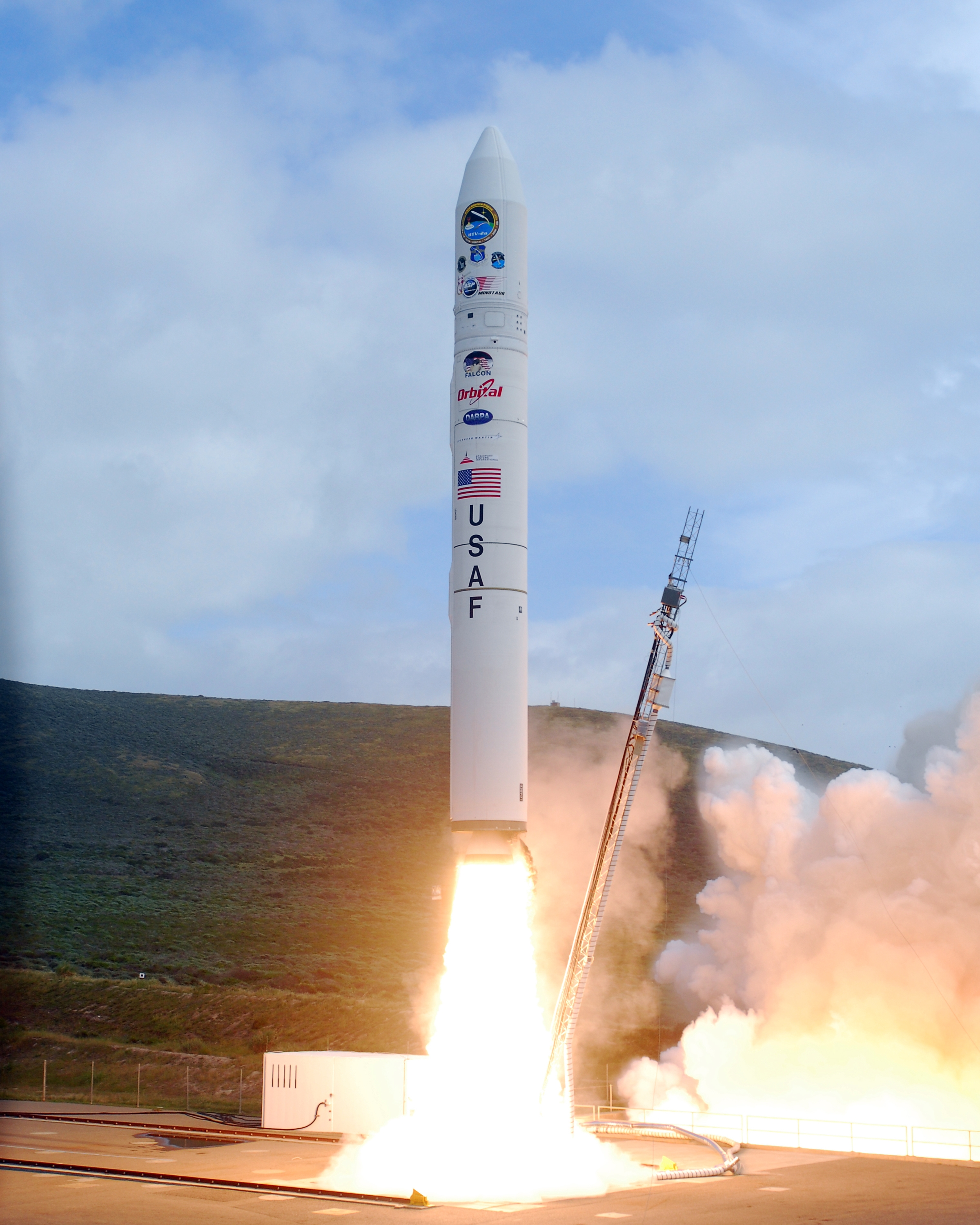
- Launch of the first Minotaur IV Lite
- Function: Small-lift launch vehicle
- Manufacturer: Northrop Grumman
- Cost per launch: $50 million (2010)

Size
- Height: 23.88 m (78.3 ft)
- Diameter: 2.34 m (7 ft 8 in)
- Mass: 86,300 kg (190,300 lb)
- Stages: 4

Capacity

Payload to LEO
- Altitude: 200 km (120 mi)
- Orbital inclination: 28.5°
- Mass: IV: 1,591 kg (3,508 lb); IV+: 1,837 kg (4,050 lb)

Payload to sub-orbital
- Mass: IV Lite: 3,000 kg (6,600 lb)

Associated rockets
- Family: Minotaur
- Based on: LGM-118 Peacekeeper
- Derivative work: Minotaur V; Minotaur VI

Launch history
- Status: Active
- Launch sites: Cape Canaveral, SLC-46; Kodiak Island, LP-1; Vandenberg, SLC-8; Wallops Island, LP-0B
- Total launches: 9
- Success(es): 9
- First flight: April 22, 2010
- Last flight: April 7, 2026 (most recent)

First stage – SR-118
- Maximum thrust: 2,224 kN (500,000 lb_{f})
- Specific impulse: 229 s (2.25 km/s)
- Burn time: 56.6 seconds
- Propellant: HTPB

Second stage – SR-119
- Maximum thrust: 1,223 kN (275,000 lb_{f})
- Specific impulse: 308 s (3.02 km/s)
- Burn time: 61 seconds
- Propellant: HTPB

Third stage – SR-120
- Maximum thrust: 289 kN (65,000 lb_{f})
- Specific impulse: 300 s (2.9 km/s)
- Burn time: 72 seconds
- Propellant: NEPE

Fourth stage (Minotaur IV) – Orion 38
- Maximum thrust: 32.2 kN (7,200 lb_{f})
- Specific impulse: 288 s (2.82 km/s)
- Burn time: 67.7 seconds
- Propellant: HTPB

Fourth stage (Minotaur IV+) – Star 48BV
- Maximum thrust: 68.6 kN (15,400 lb_{f})
- Specific impulse: 288 s (2.82 km/s)
- Burn time: 84.1 seconds
- Propellant: HTPB

Minotaur IV, also known as Peacekeeper SLV and OSP-2 PK, is a small-lift launch vehicle repurposed from the retired LGM-118 Peacekeeper, an intercontinental ballistic missile (ICBM). It is operated by Northrop Grumman and first flew on April 22, 2010, carrying the HTV-2a Hypersonic Test Vehicle. Its first orbital launch occurred on September 26, 2010, placing the Space Based Space Surveillance (SBSS) satellite into orbit for the United States Air Force.

Part of the Minotaur family of solid-fuel launch vehicles repurposed from retired ICBMs, the four-stage Minotaur IV can deliver up to 1,591 kilograms (3,508 lb) to low Earth orbit. Its first three stages use decommissioned Peacekeeper missile motors, while the baseline fourth stage is an Orion 38. The enhanced Minotaur IV+ replaces this with a Star 48BV upper stage, while the three-stage Minotaur IV Lite omits the fourth stage for suborbital missions. A five-stage derivative, Minotaur V, flew on September 7, 2013.

Launches have been conducted from SLC-8 at Vandenberg Space Force Base, LP-0B at the Mid-Atlantic Regional Spaceport, SLC-46 at Cape Canaveral Space Force Station, and Pad 1 at the Pacific Spaceport Complex – Alaska.

== Description ==
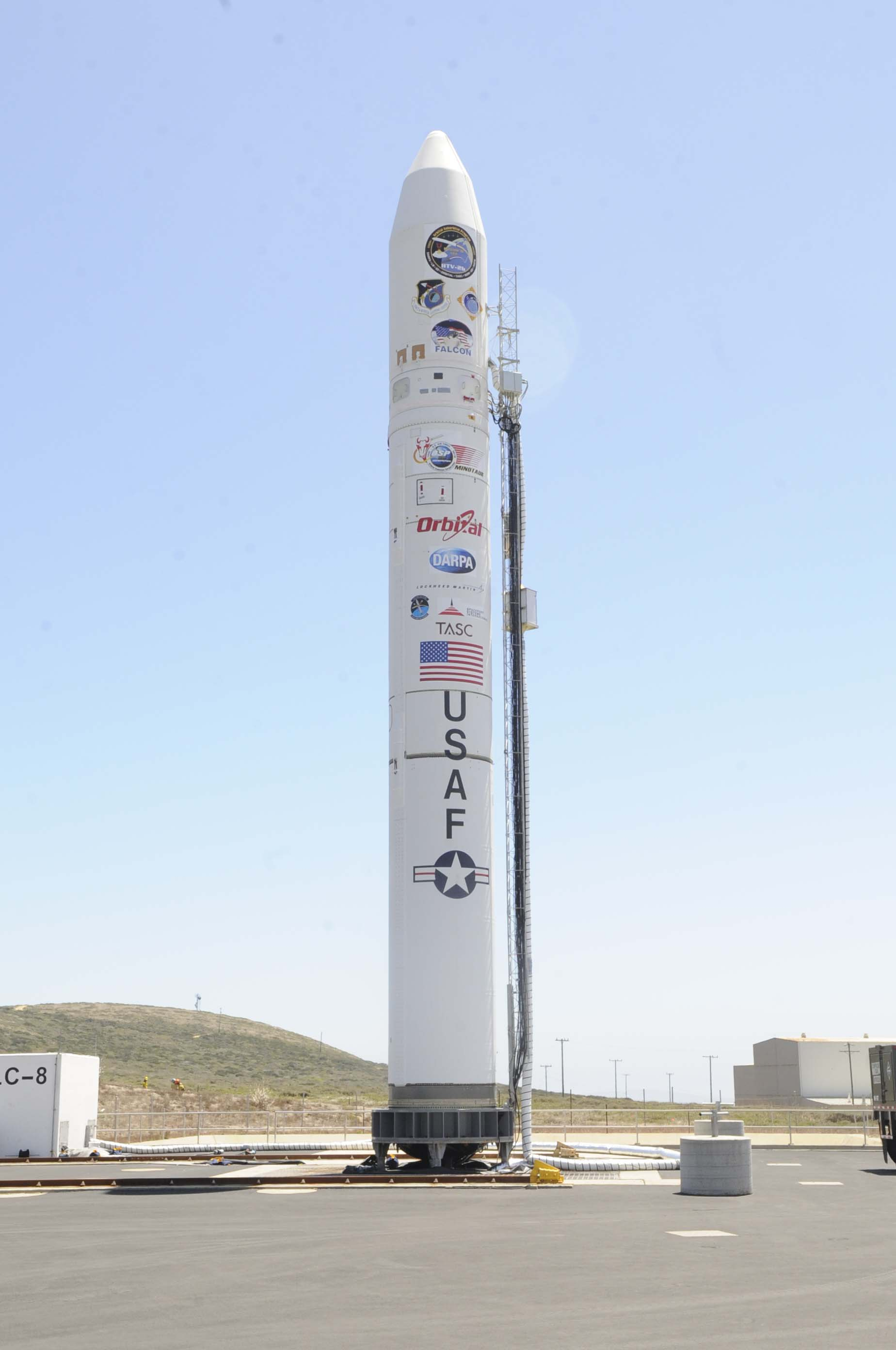
Minotaur IV Lite at Vandenberg SLC-8 prior to the launch of HTV-2b in 2011

The Minotaur IV was developed by Orbital Sciences (now owned by Northrop Grumman) as part of the United States Air Force's Orbital Suborbital Program. There are three variants available: Minotaur IV, IV+, and IV Lite. Minotaur IV and IV+ are used for low Earth orbit missions, while Minotaur IV Lite is intended for suborbital launches, such as testing prototype hypersonic vehicles. The separate Minotaur V and Minotaur VI variants are also available, with the former optimized for high-energy trajectories such as geostationary transfer orbit or trans-lunar injection, and the latter intended for heavier low Earth orbit missions.

The Minotaur IV family is derived from the LGM-118 Peacekeeper Intercontinental ballistic missile (ICBM), deployed from 1985 until 2005. The Minotaur IV family utilizes decommissioned Peacekeeper solid rocket motors, which compose the first three stages in all Minotaur IV rockets and derivatives. This relatively simple architecture allows Minotaur to be launched from essentially anywhere in the United States through the use of mobile launch facilities, although this capability has never been needed. Because of its use of decommissioned ICBM components, Minotaur IV can only be used to launch US government missions.

=== Minotaur IV ===
An exploded view of the Minotaur IV rocket

The standard Minotaur IV rocket is composed of four stages. The first stage SR118 motor provides 2,224 kilonewtons (500,000 lb_{f}) of thrust during its 56.6-second burn, followed immediately after by stage separation and second-stage ignition. The second stage, powered by an SR119 motor, burns for 61 seconds and provides an average thrust of 1,223 kilonewtons (275,000 lb_{f}). The third stage then burns for 72 seconds, with an average thrust of 289 kilonewtons (65,000 lb_{f}). The initial three stages all have thrust vector control, allowing them to steer the rocket downrange by gimballing the motor nozzles. The second and third stages also feature extendable nozzles, allowing for improved performance in the upper portions of Earth's atmosphere as well as the vacuum of space.

The fourth stage of the Minotaur IV is the Orion 38 motor, which is also used in the Minotaur-C, Minotaur I, Pegasus, and Ground-Based Interceptor rockets. This motor performs the final orbital insertion burn for the payload. Like the first three stages, the Orion 38 also features thrust vectoring, with a 5-degree range of motion.

The first 3 stages make up the majority of the rocket's body, while the smaller fourth stage is housed in a hollow cylindrical structure referred to as the "Guidance and Control Assembly skirt" (GCA skirt). The payload then mounts to the fourth stage via a structural adaptor.

For the ORS-5 mission, Minotaur IV was outfitted with a second Orion 38 motor (for a total of five stages) to allow the payload to be inserted into an equatorial orbit. In addition, the STP-S26 mission featured a Hydrazine Auxiliary Propulsion System (HAPS) to demonstrate additional orbital maneuvering capability after the payloads were deployed. The HAPS was developed for the Pegasus rocket to fine-tune the payload's orbit since solid motors are not capable of precise orbit adjustments.

The Minotaur IV family features a standard 92 in (2.3 m)-diameter carbon-composite payload fairing. A larger 110 in (2.8 m)-diameter composite fairing is also available for larger payloads. To date, no Minotaur rockets have flown with the larger fairing option.

=== Minotaur IV+ ===
The Minotaur IV+ is a higher-performance variant of the Minotaur IV. The first three stages are identical to the base model, but the Orion 38 fourth stage is replaced with a Star 48BV motor. The Star motor features more propellant than the Orion motor, allowing the rocket to carry roughly 200 kg (440 lb) of extra payload to low-Earth orbit, or can allow for payloads to be sent to higher, elliptical orbits. The Star 48BV burns for 85.2 seconds with an average thrust of 68.63 kilonewtons (15,430 lb_{f}) and also features thrust vectoring, which is uncommon for Star 48 motors. The Star 48 motor has also seen use on the Atlas V, Delta IV, and Space Shuttle, alongside over 70 missions on the Delta II.

Minotaur IV+ was further evolved to create the Minotaur V rocket, which adds an extra Star 37FM stage to the vehicle for improved high-energy performance. This configuration has only flown once as of 2025 and is not scheduled for any further launches. In addition, the more powerful Minotaur VI and Minotaur VI+ concepts were based on the Minotaur IV+, featuring an additional SR118 motor as the first stage to improve vehicle performance. However, neither Minotaur VI variant has flown and no flights are scheduled as of 2025.

=== Minotaur IV Lite ===
The Minotaur IV Lite is a suborbital configuration of Minotaur IV. It features the same first three stages as the standard variant but lacks a fourth stage. The IV Lite is intended for suborbital missions, allowing government customers to test new technologies like hypersonic aircraft or missile interception. As of 2025, the Minotaur IV Lite has only flown twice, both times in support of the HTV-2 program.

This variant is similar to the unflown Minotaur III rocket, which was also intended to perform suborbital missions.

== Launch history ==
Flight No.	Date/Time (UTC)	Variant	Launch site	Payload	Trajectory	Outcome	Remarks
1	April 22, 2010, 23:00	Minotaur IV Lite	Vandenberg, SLC-8	HTV-2a	Suborbital	Success	Successful launch, but payload failed
2	September 26, 2010, 04:41	Minotaur IV	Vandenberg, SLC-8	SBSS	SSO	Success	
3	November 20, 2010, 01:25	Minotaur IV	Kodiak Island, LP-1	STPSAT-2; FASTRAC-A; FASTRAC-B; FalconSat-5; FASTSAT; O/OREOS; RAX; NanoSail-D2	LEO	Success	STP-S26 launch. Included a Hydrazine Auxiliary Propulsion System (HAPS) to take the vehicle to a secondary orbit after placing payloads into the primary orbit.
4	August 11, 2011, 14:45	Minotaur IV Lite	Vandenberg, SLC-8	HTV-2b	Suborbital	Success	Successful launch, but payload failed
5	September 27, 2011, 15:49	Minotaur IV+	Kodiak Island, LP-1	TacSat-4	LEO	Success	First Minotaur IV+ launch
6	August 26, 2017, 06:04	Minotaur IV	Cape Canaveral, SLC-46	ORS-5	LEO	Success	Flew in a 5-stage configuration, using an extra Orion 38 motor to put ORS-5 into an equatorial orbit.
7	July 15, 2020, 13:46	Minotaur IV	Wallops Island, LP-0B	NROL-129	LEO	Success	Carried four payloads (USA-305 to USA-308). First NRO launch on a Minotaur IV and first from Virginia's Space Coast.
8	16 April 2025, 19:33	Minotaur IV	Vandenberg, SLC-8	NROL-174	LEO	Success	The first Minotaur IV to launch from Vandenberg since 2011. Likely carried 2 payloads.
9	7 April 2026, 11:33	Minotaur IV	Vandenberg, SLC-8	STPSat-7 & 10 rideshares	LEO	Success	STP-S29A mission

=== Planned launches ===
Date/Time (UTC)	Variant	Launch site	Payload	Trajectory	Remarks
NET 2026	Minotaur IV	Vandenberg, SLC‑8	EWS-OD 1	LEO	USSF-261S-A mission
TBD	Minotaur IV Lite	Vandenberg, SLC‑8	Conventional Strike Missile (CSM)	Suborbital	
TBD	Minotaur IV		?	LEO	ORS mission
TBD	Minotaur IV		?	LEO	ORS mission

== STP-S26 ==
The third Minotaur IV launch, also known as STP-S26, carried eight payloads to orbit. It was the 29th small launch vehicle mission in STP's 49-year history of flying DoD space experiments and was intended to extend previous standard interface development efforts, implementing a number of capabilities aimed at enabling responsive access to space for small experimental satellites and payloads. STP-S26 launched at 01:25 UTC on November 20, 2010, from the Kodiak Launch Complex. The launch facility contractor was Alaska Aerospace Corporation (AAC). The payloads were released into a 650 kilometres (400 mi) orbit before the Hydrazine Auxiliary Propulsion System (HAPS) upper stage was demonstrated by raising its orbital altitude to 1,200 kilometres (750 mi) and deploying two ballast payloads.

The primary objective of the STP-S26 launch was to deploy STPSAT-2 (USA-287) while also demonstrating the ability of the Minotaur IV to carry additional payloads by deploying FASTSAT, FASTRAC, RAX, O/OREOS, and FalconSat-5. A Hydrazine Auxiliary Propulsion System (HAPS) upper stage was flown aboard the Minotaur to demonstrate its ability to deploy payloads to multiple orbits; however, only mass simulators were deployed after the HAPS burn.

The launch marked the first flight of an STP-SIV (Standard Interface Vehicle) satellite, the first use of the Multi Mission Satellite Operations Center Ground System Architecture (MMSOC GSA), the first flight of the Minotaur IV's Multi-payload Adapter (MPA), the first use of a HAPS to obtain multiple orbits on a Minotaur IV flight, the first Minotaur launch from Kodiak Launch Complex (KLC), and the first deployment of CubeSats from a Minotaur IV via Poly-PicoSatellite Orbital Deployers (P-Pods).

== See also ==
- Comparison of orbital launchers families
- Comparison of orbital launch systems
