= USA-225 =

Satellite

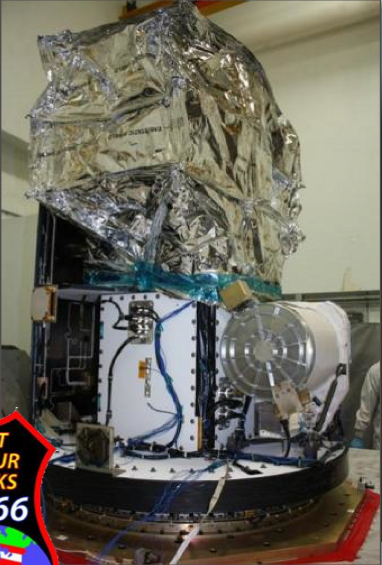
- NROL-66, carrying advanced dosimeters, during ground processing
- Mission type: Technology
- Operator: NRO
- COSPAR ID: 2011-006A
- SATCAT no.: 37364

Spacecraft properties
- Launch mass: 350 kilograms (770 lb)

Start of mission
- Launch date: 6 February 2011, 12:26 UTC
- Rocket: Minotaur I SLV-10
- Launch site: Vandenberg SLC-8
- Contractor: Orbital Sciences

Orbital parameters
- Reference system: Geocentric
- Regime: Low Earth
- Perigee altitude: 1,202 kilometers (747 mi)
- Apogee altitude: 1,230 kilometers (760 mi)
- Inclination: 90 degrees
- Period: 109.76 minutes
- Epoch: 6 February 2011

USA-225, also known as the Rapid Pathfinder Prototype (RPP) and NRO Launch 66 (NROL-66), is an American satellite which was launched in 2011. The satellite is being used to perform technology demonstration and development experiments, including advanced dosimeters to characterize the space environment from a 1,200 kilometer low Earth orbit. It is operated by the United States National Reconnaissance Office.

Rapid Pathfinder was developed for less than US$20 million over a period of less than two years. Its dimensions are 0.5 m times 0.5 m times 0.5 m, and its mass including payload is 235 kg.

A Minotaur I carrier rocket was used to launch USA-225, flying from Space Launch Complex 8 of the Vandenberg Air Force Base. The launch of was originally scheduled for March 2011; however, it was subsequently moved forwards to 5 February. During the attempt to launch on 5 February 2011, a transmitter malfunctioned, and the launch attempt was scrubbed. Another attempt was scheduled for the next day. At 12:26 on 6 February 2011, the Minotaur lifted off, carrying USA-225 into orbit. The launch was conducted by Orbital Sciences Corporation.

For launch, the RPP satellite was given the designation NRO Launch 66, or NROL-66. Upon reaching orbit it was named USA-225 in accordance with the usual naming system for American military spacecraft. The satellite received the International Designator 2011-006A, and the Satellite Catalog Number 37364.

== See also ==
- STEX
