= MightySat-2.1 =

- Mission type: Technology
- Operator: AFRL
- COSPAR ID: 2000-042A
- SATCAT no.: 26414
- Mission duration: 2 years, 4 months

Spacecraft properties
- Manufacturer: Spectrum Astro
- Launch mass: 130 kilograms (290 lb)
- Power: 330 watts

Start of mission
- Launch date: July 19, 2000
- Rocket: Minotaur I
- Launch site: Vandenberg SLC-8
- Contractor: Orbital Sciences

End of mission
- Decay date: 12 November 2002

Orbital parameters
- Reference system: Geocentric
- Regime: Low Earth
- Eccentricity: 0.00266
- Perigee altitude: 548.0 kilometers (340.5 mi)
- Apogee altitude: 585.0 kilometers (363.5 mi)
- Inclination: 97.8 degrees
- Period: 96.0 minutes
- Epoch: 19 September 2000, 16:09:00 UTC

Instruments
- Fourier Transform Hyperspectral Imager

MightySat-2.1, also known as P99-1 or Sindri was a small spacecraft developed by the Air Force Research Laboratory to test advanced technologies in imaging, communications, and spacecraft bus components in space.

== Design ==
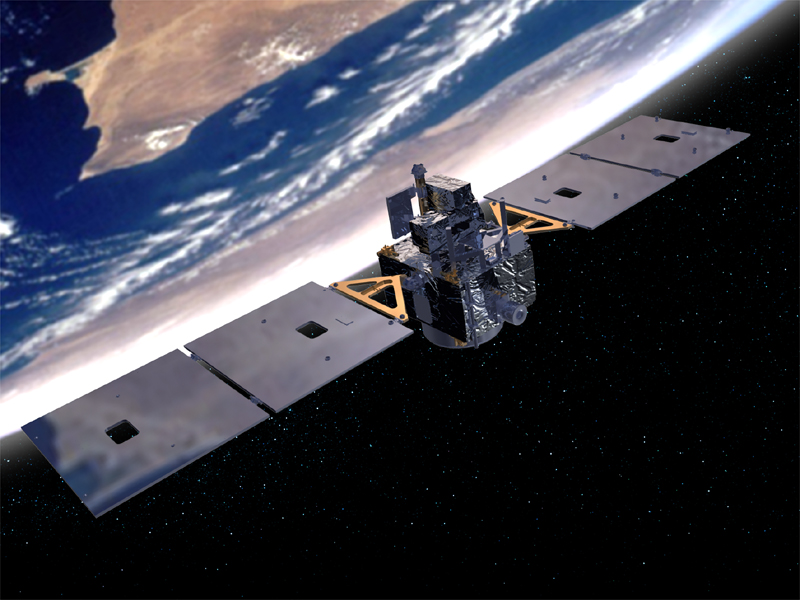
MightySat II in orbit (artist's impression)

MightySat II.1 was manufactured by Spectrum Astro in a modular approach, using, e.g., VME-based subsystems, and a planar payload deck for small experimental payloads. The satellite measured 0.67m x 0.83m x 0.86m (WxLxH) and had a launch weight of 123.7 kg (Bus Mass: 87.1 kg). Power was provided by 2-axis articulated Si solar arrays with a designed end-of-life power output of 330 W. The attitude determination and control subsystem featured a 3-axis zero-momentum-bias reaction wheel assembly with a Sun sensor, a star tracker and inertial measurement units, delivering an attitude jitter of 15.7 arcsec/sec, and pointing accuracy and knowledge of 648 and 540 arcsec, respectively. The communication was compatible with the US Air Force space-ground link system with data rates of 1 Mbit/s for payload/experiments data downlink, 2.0 kbit/s for command uplink, and 20 kbit/s for telemetry downlink. Computing and data handling was done by a RAD6000 CPU @ 20 MIPS with an IEEE VME backplane 128 MByte CPU RAM, and a 21.6 MBytes/sec transfer rate, and a 2 Gbit solid state recorder for science data. Among its 10 experiments was a Fourier transform hyperspectral imager.

== Mission ==
MightSat II.1 was launched on July 19, 2000, with a Minotaur I. It deorbited in November 2002 due to natural decay of its orbit, exceeding more than twice its nominal lifetime.

== Payload and experimental instruments ==
=== Stand-alone experiments/sensors ===
- Kestrel Fourier transform (visible) hyperspectral imager
- Quad TMS320C40 (QC40) floating point digital signal processor
- DARPA-Aerospace sponsored PicoSat launcher assembly
- Shape memory alloy thermoelastic tailoring experiment
- Starfire optical reflectors for use with Kirtland's Starfire Optical Range

=== Engineering/experimental bus components ===
- NRL miniature SGLS transponder (known as the NSX)
- Multi-functional composite bus structure
- Solar array concentrator
- Advanced composite solar array substrate
- Solar array flexible interconnect
