= Radio Aurora Explorer =

Radio Aurora Explorer (USA-218)
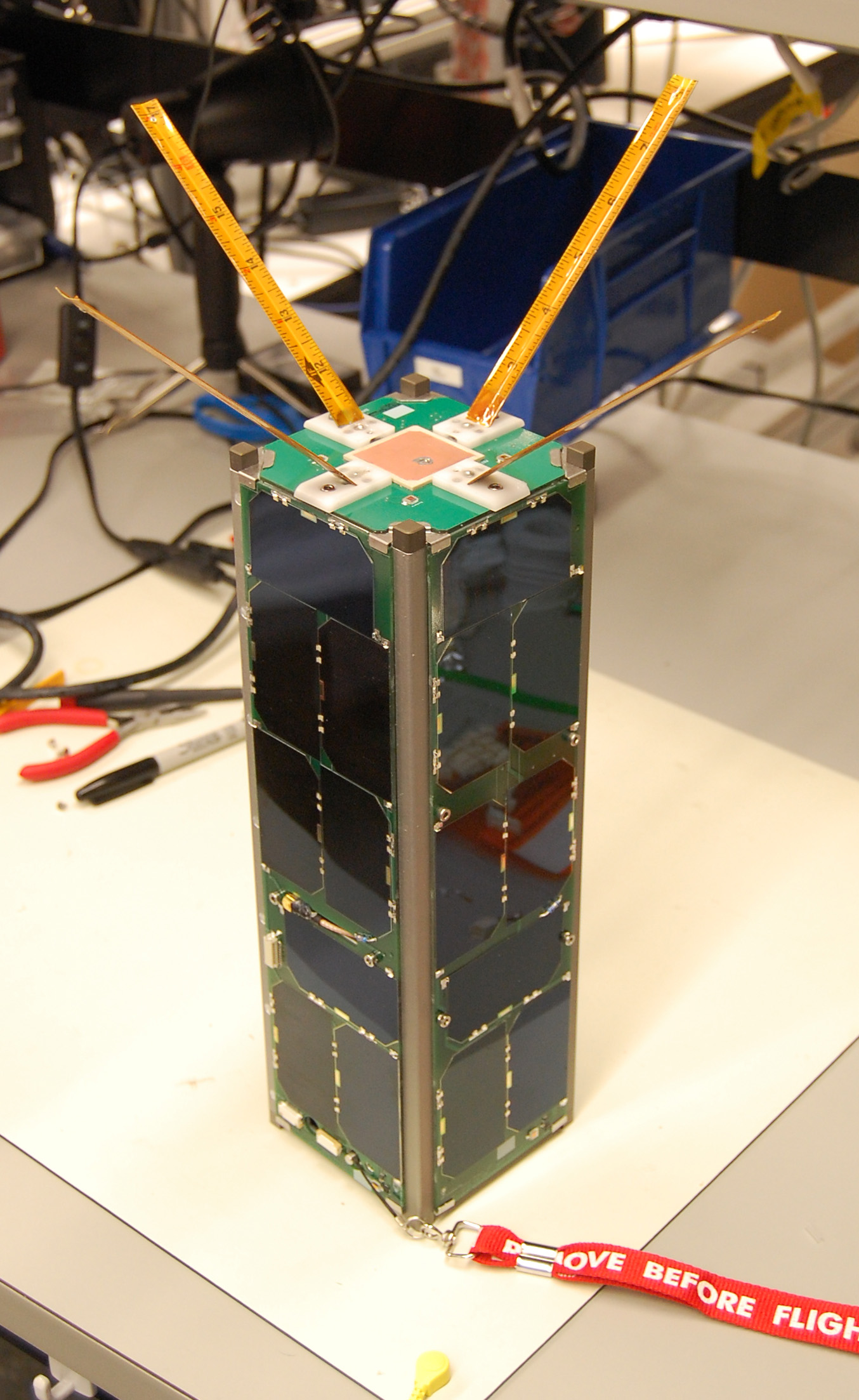
- RAX under construction
- Mission type: Auroral research
- Operator: NASA / NSF
- COSPAR ID: 2010-062B
- SATCAT no.: 37223
- Website: rax.engin.umich.edu

Spacecraft properties
- Spacecraft type: 3U CubeSat
- Launch mass: 28.0 kilograms (61.7 lb)

Start of mission
- Launch date: 20 November 2010, 01:25:00 UTC
- Rocket: Minotaur IV/HAPS
- Launch site: Kodiak Pad 1
- Contractor: Orbital Sciences

End of mission
- Last contact: May 2011

Orbital parameters
- Reference system: Geocentric
- Regime: Low Earth
- Eccentricity: 0.0021634
- Perigee altitude: 622 kilometres (386 mi)
- Apogee altitude: 653 kilometres (406 mi)
- Inclination: 71.97 degrees
- Period: 97.52 minutes
- RAAN: 73.62 degrees
- Argument of perigee: 311.60 degrees
- Epoch: 2 December 2010

Radio Aurora Explorer (RAX) is the first National Science Foundation sponsored CubeSat mission. The RAX mission is a joint effort between SRI International in Menlo Park, California and the University of Michigan in Ann Arbor, Michigan. The chief scientist at SRI International, Dr. Hasan Bahcivan, led his team at SRI to develop the payload while the chief engineer, Dr. James Cutler, led a team of students to develop the satellite bus in the Michigan Exploration Laboratory. There are currently two satellites in the RAX mission.

The RAX-1 mission, launched in November 2010, was a demonstration of the team's technological capabilities – it made great strides in CubeSat design, and was able to execute bistatic radar measurements that had never before been performed on a satellite of its size.

RAX-2 builds on this heritage by completing the scientific portion of the overall mission; it is a reflection of students learning from practical experience, and swiftly implementing new, more inventive technologies firsthand. RAX team members were able to get practical spacecraft troubleshooting experience, and applied lessons learned from RAX-1 to RAX-2, which performs the same mission concept with improved bus performance and additional operational modes. RAX-2 launched on October 28, 2011 as part of the NASA ELaNa-3 mission.

== Capabilities and mission objectives ==
RAX is capable of carrying out scientific procedures that previously could only be done with large satellites, thanks in part to new enabling technologies. RAX's primary mission objective is to study large plasma formations in the ionosphere, the highest region of our atmosphere. These plasma instabilities can create magnetic field-aligned irregularities (FAI), which are dense plasma clouds known to disrupt communication between Earth and orbiting spacecraft. To study FAI, the RAX satellites utilize a large incoherent scatter radar located in Poker Flat, Alaska (known as PFISR). PFISR transmits powerful radio signals into the plasma instabilities, which then scatter in the FAI and are received by the orbiting RAX spacecraft. The signals are then processed by RAX's onboard computer and transmitted back to Earth for scientific analysis. Earth-based scientists have been unable to study these unique plasma formations from the ground, and RAX will serve as a key transition point between Earth and Space.

The goal of the RAX-2 mission is to enhance understanding of FAI formation so that short-term forecast models can be generated. This will aid spacecraft operators with planning their mission operations around periods of expected communication disruption. The RAX-1 mission made great strides in CubeSat design, and was able to execute bistatic radar measurements never before been performed with such a spacecraft. RAX team members applied the lessons learned from RAX-1 to the design of a second flight unit, RAX-2, which will perform the same mission concept of the first RAX that launched in November 2010, with improved bus performance and additional operational modes. Science measurements will be enhanced through interactive experiments with high power ionospheric heaters where FAI will be generated on demand.

== Testing ==
RAX undergoes the same rigorous testing that its bigger cousins do, to meet many of the same requirements. During testing, RAX was able to successfully upload commands and receive telemetry from a host of sensors. These sensors yielded data including temperature and voltage, GPS position and velocity, spacecraft attitude (for orientation determination), and the general status of all of the RAX subsystems. The ground station software was also tested over radio links, proving that the team will be able to listen and interact with RAX remotely.

Over the course of the seventeen-month development, the team also built additional testing facilities to evaluate sensors and prototypes. An in-house Helmholtz Cage was constructed to create and simulate the changes in magnetic fields experienced by the satellite throughout its orbit over time. The cage was designed to characterize the magnetometers and run hardware-in-the-loop testing with RAX. This essentially puts the CubeSat into a virtual orbit, and allows the team to generate appropriate magnetic fields to test RAX's ability to determine how it is oriented. The Helmholtz Cage is also used to evaluate magnetic cleanliness and final integration testing.

== RAX 1 Mission ==
=== Launch ===
RAX-1 was sent into orbit on November 19, 2010 by the United States Air Force as a payload manifested on the United States Department of Defense Space Test Program’s (STP) STP-S26 mission, launched from Kodiak Launch Complex on Kodiak Island in Alaska. The rocket used for this launch was a Minotaur IV rocket developed by Orbital Sciences.

=== Results ===
The scientific payload and the majority of the bus systems performed as expected, including the GPS-based position and time subsystem, attitude determination and control, communications, and on-board processing. Unfortunately, the mission ended prematurely after approximately two months of operation due to a gradual degradation of the solar panels that ultimately resulted in a loss of power. RAX team members applied the lessons learned from RAX-1 to the design of a second flight unit, RAX-2.

== RAX 2 Mission ==
=== Launch ===
RAX-2 launched on October 28, 2011, as a secondary payload on NASA's NPOESS Preparatory Project mission. The CubeSat launch was sponsored by NASA as part of the ElaNA-3 program. It launched from Vandenberg Air Force Base in California on a United Launch Alliance Delta II rocket, flying in the 7920-10 configuration. CubeSat separation occurred 98 minutes after launch, and beacons from RAX-2 were heard shortly thereafter.
