= FASTSAT =

NASA technology demonstration small satellite

FASTSAT-HSV 01 (USA-220)
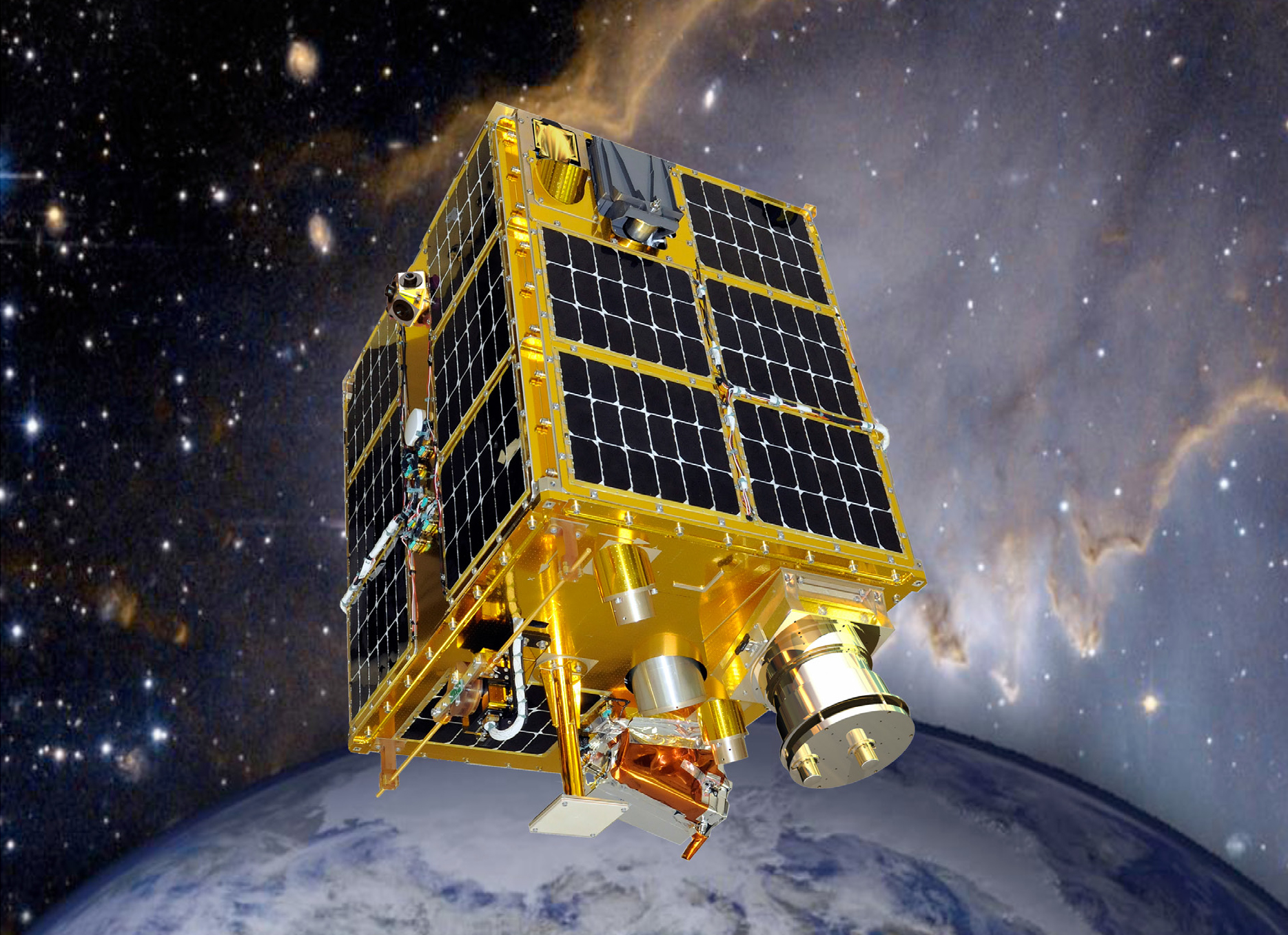
- Illustration of the FASTSAT microsatellite
- Names: Fast, Affordable, Science and Technology Satellite-Huntsville 01; FASTSAT-HSV 01; FASTSAT-Huntsville 01; USA-220
- Mission type: Technology demonstration
- Operator: NASA / MSFC
- COSPAR ID: 2010-062D
- SATCAT no.: 37225
- Mission duration: 2 years (planned); 15 years, 2 months, 28 days (in orbit)

Spacecraft properties
- Manufacturer: NASA Marshall Space Flight Center
- Launch mass: 180 kg (400 lb)
- Dimensions: 61 × 71 × 97 cm (24 × 28 × 38 in)
- Power: 90 watts

Start of mission
- Launch date: 20 November 2010, 01:25:00 UTC
- Rocket: Minotaur IV / HAPS
- Launch site: Kodiak Launch Complex, Pad 1
- Contractor: Orbital Sciences
- Entered service: 2010

End of mission
- Last contact: May 2013

Orbital parameters
- Reference system: Geocentric orbit
- Regime: Low Earth orbit
- Perigee altitude: 626 km (389 mi)
- Apogee altitude: 653 km (406 mi)
- Inclination: 72.0°
- Period: 97.7 minutes

Fast, Affordable, Science and Technology Satellite-Huntsville 01 or FASTSAT-Huntsville 01 of the NASA. FASTSAT-HSV 01 was flying on the STP-S26 mission - a joint activity between NASA and the U.S. Department of Defense Space Test Program, or DoD STP. FASTSAT and all of its six experiments flying on the STP-S26 multi-spacecraft/payload mission have been approved by the Department of Defense Space and Experiments Review Board (USA-220).

== Spacecraft description ==
The satellite was designed, developed and tested over a period of 14 months at NASA's Marshall Space Flight Center in Huntsville, Alabama, in partnership with the Von Braun Center for Science & Innovation and Dynetics, both of Huntsville, and the Department of Defense's Space Test Program.

== Instruments ==
FASTSAT HSV-01, a microsatellite satellite bus that carried six experiment payloads to low Earth orbit. There were six experiments (3 NASA, 3 DoD), including:

- NanoSail-D2, is designed to demonstrate deployment of a compact solar sail boom system that could lead to further development of this alternate propulsion technology and FASTSAT's ability to eject a nanosatellite from a microsatellite - while avoiding re-contact with the FASTSAT satellite bus. NanoSail-D2, managed by the Marshall Space Flight Center, was the first NASA solar sail deployed in low Earth orbit. It was designed and built by NASA engineers at Marshall in collaboration with the Nanosatellite Missions Office at NASA's Ames Research Center in Moffett Field, California. This experiment is a combined effort between the United States Army Space and Missile Defense Command and the Von Braun Center for Science & Innovation, both located in Huntsville, Alabama.
- The other two technology experiments include the Threat Detection System and the Miniature Star Tracker, both managed by the Air Force Research Laboratory (AFRL) at Kirtland Air Force Base, Albuquerque, New Mexico.
- Miniature Imager for Neutral Ionospheric Atoms and Magnetospheric Electrons (MINI-ME): a low energy neutral atom imager, was designed to detect neutral atoms formed in the plasma population around Earth to improve global space weather prediction. Low energy neutral atom imaging is a technique first pioneered at Goddard Space Flight Center, that allows scientists to observe remotely various trapped charged particle populations around Earth that would normally only be able to be observed in-situ – or exactly where an instrument is located. MINI-ME represents an improvement on the same kind of instrument, LENA, that flew on the IMAGE mission about ten years ago. Measurements made by instruments like MINI-ME will enable more accurate prediction of space weather and a better understanding of plasma physics processes near Earth.
- Plasma Impedance Spectrum Analyzer (PISA): PISA was designed to test a new approach to measuring the electron number density (number of electrons per cubic centimeter) in the ionosphere. PISA uses a wide-band, rapid-sampling "impedance probe" technique, which stimulates the plasma surrounding FASTSAT with a short antenna. This technique identifies natural resonance frequencies in the plasma (such as the "plasma frequency"), which are directly related to the electron number density, magnetic field strength, and electron temperature. This approach is similar to striking a bell and using the tones created to deduce how the bell is constructed. PISA demonstrated the accuracy of this technique, and provide measurements of small-scale structure in the plasma. These small scale structures are important because they tend to scatter radio waves transmitted by satellites at high altitudes such as GPS or communication satellites. A better understanding of when and where these structures form, and their extent, will help to improve forecasts of communication and navigation outages. PISA was built at Goddard Space Flight Center.
- Thermospheric Temperature Imager (TTI): TTI was designed to provide the first global-scale measurements of temperature in the top-most region of Earth's atmosphere or "thermosphere". The TTI is used to observe thermospheric temperature profiles in the 90–260 km (56–162 mi) region. The temperature profile regulates the height of the atmosphere and controls the atmospheric density at orbital altitudes. Large increases in atmospheric density increase aerodynamic drag experienced by low altitude, Earth orbiting spacecraft leading to premature de-orbiting of the spacecraft.
