= O/OREOS =

NASA nanosatellite with 2 astrobiology experiments on board

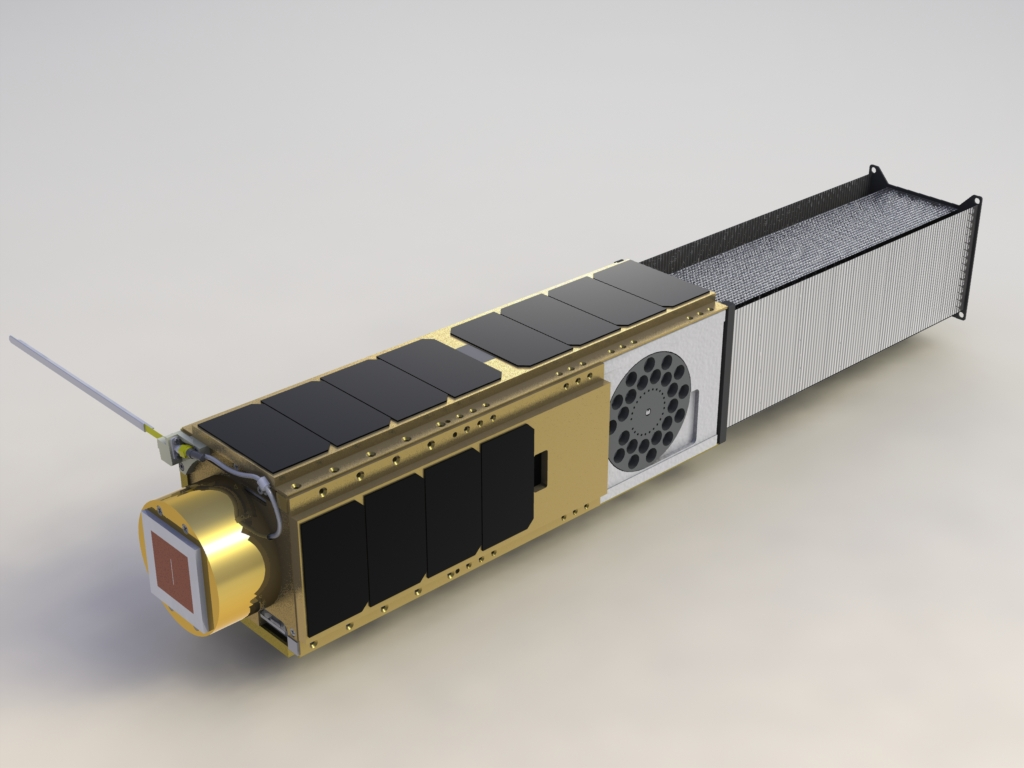
- Computer-generated image of the O/OREOS nanosatellite
- Names: Organism/Organic Exposure to Orbital Stresses; USA-219
- Mission type: Technology demonstration, Astrobiology
- Operator: NASA
- COSPAR ID: 2010-062C
- SATCAT no.: 37224
- Website: NASA
- Mission duration: 6 months (planned)

Spacecraft properties
- Spacecraft: CubeSat
- Bus: 3U CubeSat
- Manufacturer: NASA Ames Research Center and Stanford University
- Launch mass: 5.5 kg (12 lb)
- Dimensions: 34 cm × 10 cm × 10 cm (13.4 in × 3.9 in × 3.9 in)
- Power: Solar cells and batteries

Start of mission
- Launch date: 20 November 2010, 01:25:00 UTC
- Rocket: Minotaur IV
- Launch site: Kodiak, LP-1
- Contractor: Orbital Sciences Corporation

Orbital parameters
- Reference system: Geocentric orbit
- Regime: Low Earth orbit
- Perigee altitude: 621 km (386 mi)
- Apogee altitude: 646 km (401 mi)
- Inclination: 72.0°
- Period: 97.7 minutes

The O/OREOS (Organism/Organic Exposure to Orbital Stresses) is a NASA automated CubeSat nanosatellite laboratory approximately the size of a loaf of bread that contains two separate astrobiology experiments on board. Developed by the Small Spacecraft Division at NASA Ames Research Center, the spacecraft was successfully launched as a secondary payload on STP-S26 led by the Space Test Program of the United States Air Force on a Minotaur IV launch vehicle from Kodiak Island, Alaska on 20 November 2010, at 01:25:00 UTC.

== Mission overview ==
The O/OREOS satellite is NASA's first CubeSat to demonstrate the capability to have two distinct, completely independent science experiments on an autonomous satellite. One experiment will test how microorganisms survive and adapt to the stresses of space; the other will monitor the stability of organic molecules in space.

The overall goal of the O/OREOS mission is to demonstrate the capability to do low-cost science experiments on autonomous nanosatellites in space in support of the 'Astrobiology Small Payloads' program under the Planetary Science Division of the Science Mission Directorate at NASA's Headquarters. NASA's Ames Small Spacecraft Division manages the O/OREOS mission while all operations will be conducted by staff and students from the Robotic Systems Laboratory at Santa Clara University. Scientists will apply the knowledge they gain while investigating the space environment and studying how exposure to space changes organisms to help to answer astrobiology's fundamental questions on the origin, evolution, and distribution of life.

The technology developed in this mission enables a new generation of lightweight, low-cost payloads suitable for future secondary payload opportunities —"piggyback rides"— to the Moon, Mars, and beyond, where they can address evolutionary questions, identify human exploration risks, and study planetary protection concerns.

== Spacecraft overview ==
Continuing Ames' development of triple-cube nanosatellite technology and flight systems, which includes the successful GeneSat-1 (launch 16 December 2006) and PharmaSat (launch 19 May 2009) missions, O/OREOS is constructed from off-the-shelf commercial and NASA-designed parts to create a fully self-contained, automated, stable, lightweight space science laboratory with innovative environment and power-control techniques. The spacecraft is equipped with sensors to monitor the levels of internal pressure, temperature, humidity, radiation and acceleration while its communications system regularly transmits data back to Earth for scientific analysis.

The organics payload will house 24 samples in four separate micro-environments to mimic space, lunar, Martian and "wet" planetary conditions. The samples are housed in a rotating carousel and are imaged regularly with UV/VIS spectroscopic instrumentation while being exposed to the space environment. The biological payload is a self-contained pressure vessel which provides life support (air pressure, humidity, growth media, and temperature control) for organisms as they are exposed to the radiation and weightless conditions in space for six months.

In addition to the experiments, the satellite is equipped with a passive magnetic attitude control system, solar panels to generate electric power, a UHF amateur band radio beacon which broadcasts real-time telemetry, battery packs, and NASA's first propellant-less mechanism to ensure that once O/OREOS has completed its mission it will de-orbit and burn up as it re-enters Earth's atmosphere.

== Primary experiments ==
The goals of the O/OREOS mission include:

- demonstrating key small satellite technologies that can enable future low-cost astrobiology experiment
- deploying a miniature UV/VIS/NIR spectrometer suitable for in-situ astrobiology and other scientific investigations
- testing the capability to establish a variety of experimental reaction conditions to enable the study of astrobiological processes on small satellites
- measuring the chemical evolution of organic molecules in LEO under conditions that can be extrapolated to interstellar and planetary environments

=== Space Environment Survivability of Live Organisms ===
The O/OREOS Space Environment Survivability of Live Organisms (SESLO) experiment will characterize the growth, activity, health and ability of microorganisms to adapt to the stresses of the space environment. The experiment is sealed in a vessel at one atmosphere and contains two types of bacteria commonly found in salt ponds and soil: Halorubrum chaoviatoris, which thrives in the sort of briny water that may exist below the surface of Mars or on Jupiter's moon Europa, and Bacillus subtilis, which holds the record for surviving in space for the longest duration (6 years on a NASA satellite). The bacteria were launched as dried spores and revived at different times during the mission with a nutrient-filled fluid a few days, three months and six months after launch.

Once the satellite is in orbit, the bacteria are constantly being exposed to low Earth orbit radiation while floating in micro-gravity. The SESLO experiment measures the microbes' population density. There was an expected change in color as dyed liquid nutrients were consumed and metabolized by the microorganisms. This color change is used to determine the effects of the combined exposure to space radiation and microgravity on organism growth, health, and survival when compared to a ground-based control experiment.

==== Results ====
The SESLO experiment measured the long-term survival, germination, and growth responses, including metabolic activity.

=== Space Environment Viability of Organics ===
The O/OREOS Space Environment Viability of Organics (SEVO) experiment will monitor the stability and changes in four classes organic matter as they are exposed to space conditions. Scientists selected the organic samples to represent some building blocks of life and abundant aromatic molecules, they think are distributed throughout the Milky Way galaxy.

The controlled environments in the SEVO reaction cells do not accurately represent natural environments; rather, they are used to establish a set of initial conditions for the chemical reactants involved in photochemical experiments. These reactants were chosen because they can be related to fundamental processes believed to occur in planetary surface environments, comets, and the interstellar medium. As such, each of the different cell types was carefully chosen to simulate important aspects of astrobiologically relevant environments.

Four classes of organic compounds, namely an amino acid, a quinone, a polycyclic aromatic hydrocarbon (PAH) and a metallo-porphyrin are being studied. The compounds were placed in four different micro-environments that simulate some conditions in interplanetary space, on the Moon, on Mars and in the outer Solar System. The experiment continuously exposes the organic matter to radiation in the form of solar ultraviolet (UV) light, visible light, trapped-particle and cosmic radiation over six months in space. Scientists will determine the stability of the organic matter by studying in-situ the changes in UV, visible and near-infrared light absorption through daily measurements. The survival rate of these molecules will help determine whether some of Earth's biochemistry might have been performed in space and later delivered by meteorites. The data may also help in deciding which molecules are good biomarkers that can signal the existence of past or present life on another world.

==== Results ====
Spectra from the PAH thin film in a water-vapor-containing microenvironment indicate measurable change due to solar irradiation in orbit, while three other nominally water-free microenvironments show no appreciable change. The quinone anthrarufin showed high photostability and no significant spectroscopically measurable change in any of the four microenvironments during the same period.

== Amateur satellite tracking ==
O/OREOS is equipped with an amateur radio beacon which operates at 437.305 MHz. HAM radio operators can decode the satellite's AX.25 packets and submit them to NASA via the beacon processing website.

== Mission status ==
In the fall of 2011, nearly 100,000 beacon packets have been submitted by amateurs in 20 countries. About 6 MB of data have been downlinked and processed by the Santa Clara University operation team through S-band (WiFi) bidirectional radio. In addition to the science results from both payloads, these data include measurements of the radiation dose, rotation data, temperature, and health status of the spacecraft. Multiple commands were uplinked successfully to tune operational parameters.

All three biological experiments using the SESLO payload are complete; they were executed on 3 December 2010, 18 February and 19 May 2011. From the SEVO experiment, the project observed nominal spectrometer function, and so far 24 sets of 24 UV-visible spectra have been recorded and downlinked, amounting to nearly 600 spectra from 4 organic sample types embedded in 4 microenvironments.

== See also ==
- Bion
- BIOPAN
- Biosatellite program
- EXPOSE
- List of microorganisms tested in outer space
- OREOcube
- Tanpopo
