= Star 48 =

American solid rocket motor developed by Thiokol

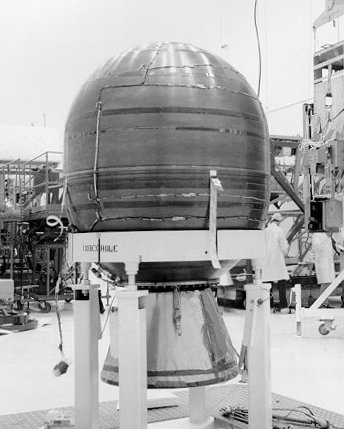
- Star-48B rocket motor
- Country of origin: United States
- Date: 1982–present
- Manufacturer: Thiokol
- Predecessor: Star 37

Solid-fuel motor

The Star 48 is the largest of a family of solid rocket motors used by many space propulsion and launch vehicle stages, almost exclusively as an upper stage. It was developed primarily by Thiokol Propulsion and after several mergers, is manufactured by Northrop Grumman’s Space Systems division. A Star 48B stage is also one of the few man-made items sent on escape trajectories out of the Solar System, although it is derelict since its use. The Star 48B variant was the PAM-D upper stage used on the retired Delta II rocket.

The Star 48 has been used as an upper stage in three- and four-stage launch systems.

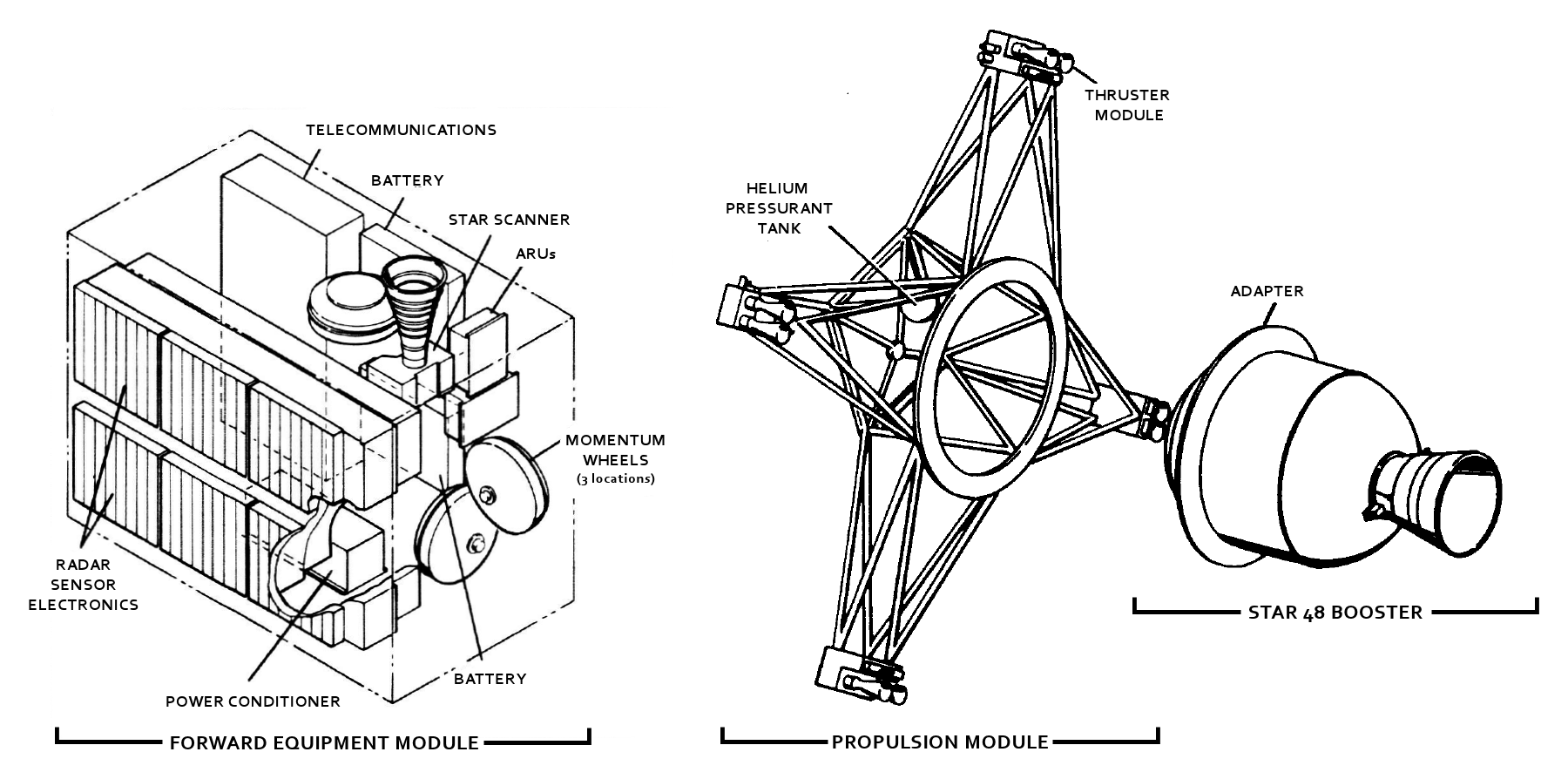
In the Magellan Venus orbiter

== Overview ==
The "48" designation refers to the approximate diameter of the fuel casing in inches (122 cm); Thiokol had also manufactured other motors such as the Star 37 and Star 30. Internally, Thiokol's designation was TE-M-711 for early versions and TE-M-799 for later ones. Subtypes are given one or more letter suffixes after the diameter number, or a trailing number (i.e., "-2") after the internal designation. The "T" prefix stands for Thiokol, and the following letter refers to the company division that developed the rocket motor. In this case, "E" refers to the Elkton, MD division, and the "M" stands for the motor.

The Star 48 holds 2,000 kg of propellant. The most common use of the Star 48 was as the final stage of the Delta II launch vehicles. Other launchers such as ULA's Atlas 551 have also incorporated the motor but with lower frequency. On board the Space Shuttle, the complete stage (motor plus accessories) was referred to as the Payload Assist Module (PAM), as the Shuttle could only take satellites to low Earth orbit. Because geostationary orbit is much more lucrative, the additional stage was needed for the final leg of the journey. On such missions, the stage was spin-stabilized. A turntable, mounted in the shuttle payload bay or atop the previous Delta stage, spun the PAM and payload to approximately 60 rpm prior to release.

Usually after motor burnout and just prior to satellite release the PAM is de-spun using a yo-yo de-spin technique.

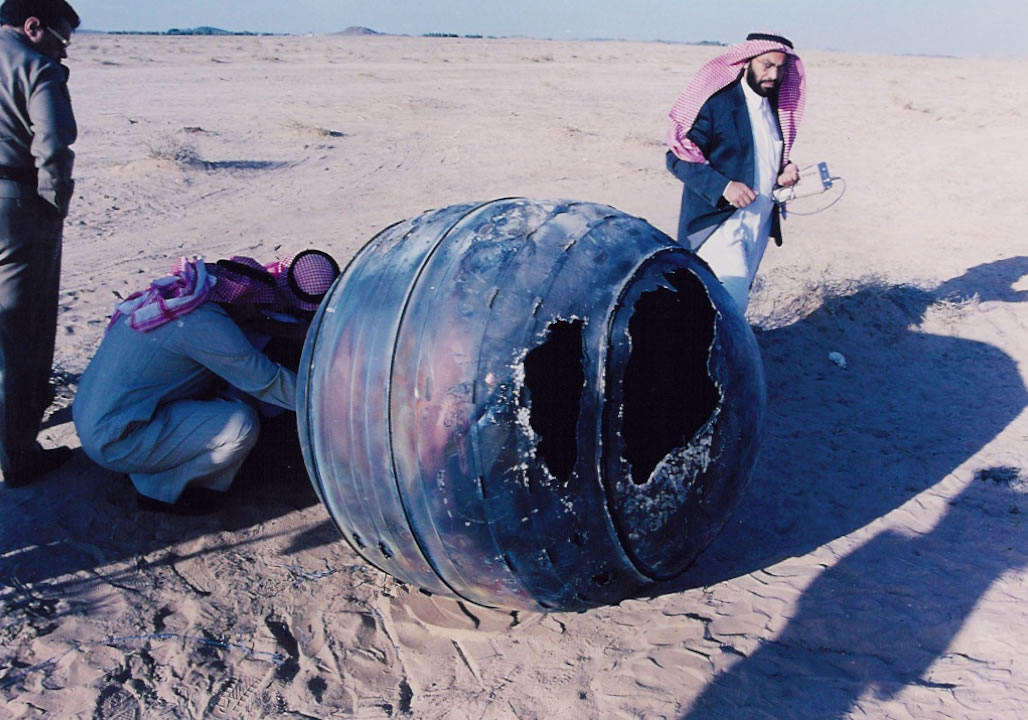
Saudi inspectors at the crash site of a Star 48 Payload Assist Module in January 2001

A Star 48 Payload Assist Module that had been used to launch a USA-91 GPS satellite in 1993 crashed in the Saudi Arabian desert in January 2001, after its orbit decayed. The unit did not burn up on reentry and was positively identified on the ground.

A Star 48B motor used in the 3rd stage of the New Horizons probe was the first part of the New Horizons mission to reach Jupiter, arriving before the probe. It also crossed Pluto's orbit in 2015 at a distance of 200 million kilometers.

In 2013 a Star 48GXV ("G" for "graphite case") was tested for the Solar Probe Plus mission (which later was renamed to the Parker Solar Probe) but the development was cancelled, in favor of a Delta IV Heavy / Star 48BV combination. for the launch in 2018.

A non-spinning, thrust-vectoring version called Star 48BV is available, and is the final stage of the Minotaur IV+ launch vehicle.

== Star 48B ==
The Star 48B version has an extra 11 kilograms of propellant more than the regular Star 48, for a total of 2011 kg. There is a version of the Star 48B that is lengthened and also heavier, called the Star 48B L.

In operation as a third stage, the Star 48B sits on top of the spin table, and before it is separated, it is spun up to stabilize it during the separation from the previous stage. (see also spin-stabilisation) The Star 48B can produce 15,000 pounds of thrust (66723 newtons), with a burn time of 1 minute 27 seconds.

Star 48B was used on the Atlas-E/F SGS-2, and is the basis for the McDonnell Douglas PAM-D upper stage used on the Delta rocket.

=== Use on New Horizons ===
A Star 48B was used on the third stage of the New Horizons spacecraft launch. New Horizons was launched by ULA's Atlas V 551 in January 2006, and the Star 48B booster was launched along with the New Horizons's spacecraft on an escape trajectory out of the Solar System. The Star 48B ignited and burned for 84 seconds, taking both on a trajectory past Pluto; however, because the Star 48B became derelict and did not have course corrections like the NH spacecraft, it was projected to miss Pluto by hundreds of millions of miles.

New Horizons' Star 48B was calculated to arrive at Jupiter six hours before New Horizons, and on October 15, 2015, passed through Pluto's orbit at a distance of 213 million kilometers (over 1 au) distant from Pluto. This was nearly four months after the New Horizons probe did.

=== Europa Clipper ===
NASA intended to launch the Europa Clipper using a Star 48 on a SpaceX Falcon Heavy. The addition of a Star 48 "kick stage" would have allowed the Clipper mission to reach Europa without needing a gravity assist from Venus. This was later removed with an updated Mars gravity assist route.

== Star 48 version details ==
Thiokol Star 48 family
Name	Thiokol#	Mass (kg)		Prop. mass fract.	Imp.		Burn (s)
Name	Thiokol#	Total	Empty	Prop. mass fract.	Spec., I_{sp} (s)	Tot. (kNs)	Burn (s)
Star 48	TE-M-711-3	2114.0	114.2	0.946	286.6	5647.51	
Star 48	TE-M-711-8	2116.3	116.4	0.945	292.9	5766.23	
Star 48A S	TE-M-799-1	2574.1	144.2	0.944	283.4	6798.70	87
Star 48A L	TE-M-799	2582.3	152.4	0.941	289.9	6955.98	87
Star 48B S	TE-M-711-17	2133.7	123.8	0.942	286.0	5674.77	84
Star 48B L	TE-M-711-1	2140.5	130.6	0.939	292.1	5799.17	84
Star 48BV	TE-M-940-1						

== See also ==
- Star (rocket stage)
- List of artificial objects leaving the Solar System
- Three-stage-to-orbit
