= Minotaur I =

Space launch vehicle

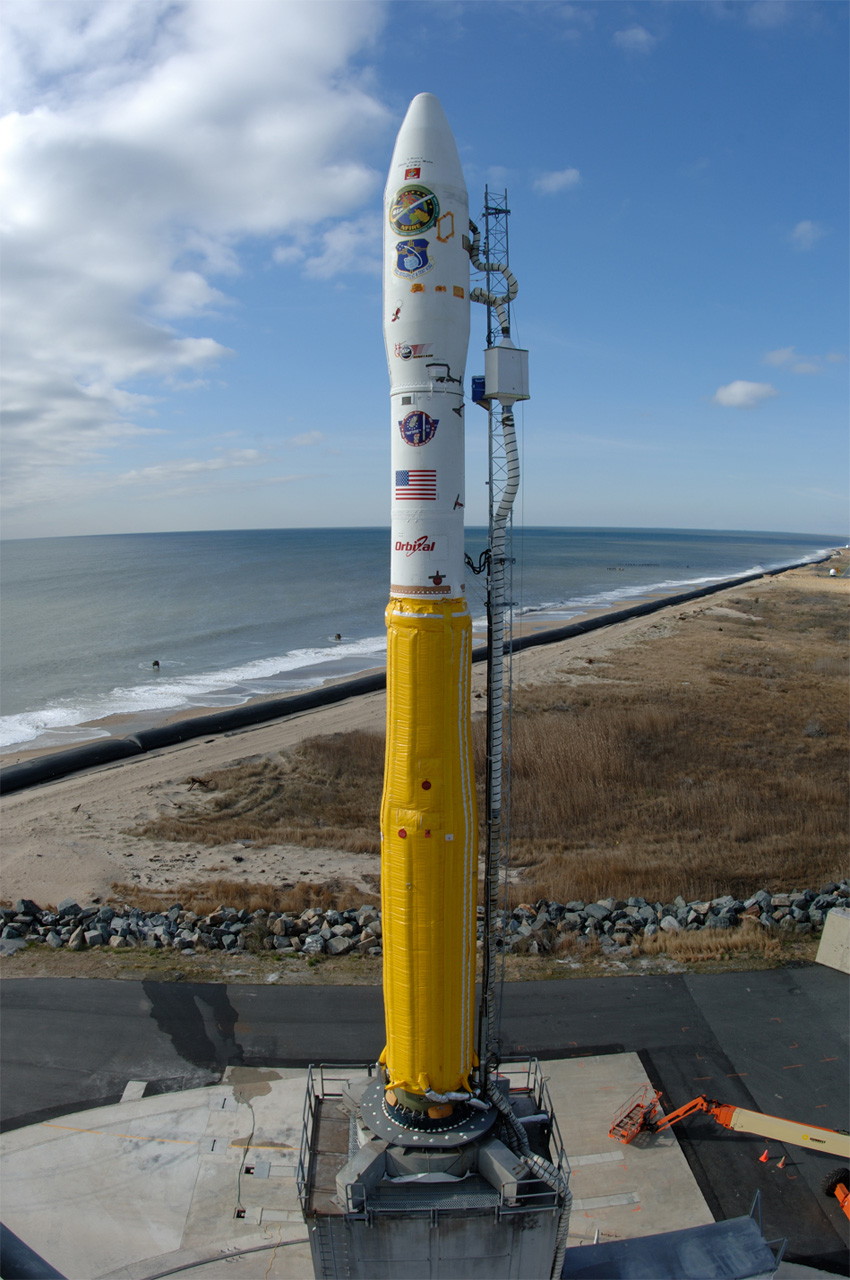
- Minotaur I with NFIRE at MARS
- Function: Small expendable launch system
- Manufacturer: Orbital Sciences (2000–2015); Orbital ATK (2015–2018); Northrop Grumman (2018–present)
- Country of origin: United States

Size
- Height: 19.21 metres (63.0 ft)
- Diameter: 1.67 metres (5 ft 6 in)
- Mass: 36,200 kilograms (79,800 lb)
- Stages: 4 or 5

Capacity

Payload to LEO
- Mass: 580 kilograms (1,280 lb)

Payload to SSO
- Mass: 331 kilograms (730 lb)

Launch history
- Status: Active
- Launch sites: Vandenberg, SLC-8; Wallops Island, LP-0B
- Total launches: 13
- Success(es): 13
- First flight: 27 January 2000
- Last flight: 18 June 2024

First stage – M55A1
- Powered by: 1 Solid
- Maximum thrust: 935 kilonewtons (210,000 lb_{f})
- Propellant: Solid

Second stage – SR19
- Powered by: 1 Solid
- Maximum thrust: 268 kilonewtons (60,000 lb_{f})
- Propellant: Solid

Third stage – Orion 50XL
- Powered by: 1 Solid
- Maximum thrust: 118.2 kilonewtons (26,600 lb_{f})
- Burn time: 74 seconds
- Propellant: Solid

Fourth stage – Orion 38
- Powered by: 1 Solid
- Maximum thrust: 34.8 kilonewtons (7,800 lb_{f})
- Burn time: 68 seconds
- Propellant: Solid

The Minotaur I, or just Minotaur is an American expendable launch system derived from the Minuteman II missile. It is used to launch small satellites for the US Government, and is a member of the Minotaur family of rockets produced by Orbital Sciences Corporation (now Northrop Grumman).

== Vehicle ==
Minotaur I rockets consist of the M55A1 first stage and SR19 second stage of a decommissioned Minuteman missile. The Orion 50XL and Orion 38, from the Pegasus rocket, are used as third and fourth stages. A HAPS (Hydrazine Auxiliary Propulsion System) upper stage can also be flown if greater precision is needed, or the rocket needs to be able to maneuver to deploy multiple payloads. It can place up to 580 kilograms (1,280 lb) of payload into a 185-kilometer (115 mi) low Earth orbit at 28.5 degrees of inclination.

The Minotaur I is 69 feet tall and 5 feet wide.

Initially Minotaur I launches are conducted from Space Launch Complex 8 at the Vandenberg Air Force Base. Starting with the launch of TacSat-2 in December 2006, launches have also been conducted from Pad 0B at the Mid-Atlantic Regional Spaceport on Wallops Island.

== Launch history ==
There have been thirteen launches of the Minotaur I, all successful.

Minotaur I launch history
Flight	Date (UTC)	Payload	Launch pad	Trajectory	Result
1	January 27, 2000; 03:03:06	JAWSat (P98-1) (FalconSat1 / ASUSat1 / OCSE / OPAL)	Vandenberg SLC-8	LEO	Success
2	July 19, 2000; 20:09:00	MightySat II.1 (Sindri, P99-1) / MEMS 2A / MEMS 2B	Vandenberg SLC-8	LEO	Success
3	April 11, 2005; 13:35:00	XSS-11	Vandenberg SLC-8	LEO	Success
4	September 23, 2005; 02:24:00	Streak (STP-R1)	Vandenberg SLC-8	LEO	Success
5	April 15, 2006; 01:40:00	COSMIC (FORMOSAT-3)	Vandenberg SLC-8	LEO	Success
6	December 16, 2006; 12:00	TacSat-2 / GeneSat-1	MARS LP-0B	LEO	Success
7	April 24, 2007; 06:48	NFIRE	MARS LP-0B	LEO	Success
8	May 19, 2009; 23:55	TacSat-3	MARS LP-0B	LEO	Success
9	February 6, 2011; 12:26	USA-225 (NROL-66)	Vandenberg SLC-8	LEO	Success
10	June 30, 2011; 03:09	ORS-1	MARS LP-0B	LEO	Success
11	November 20, 2013; 01:15	ORS-3, STPSat-3 and 28 CubeSat satellites	MARS LP-0B	LEO	Success
12	June 15, 2021; 13:35	NROL-111	MARS LP-0B	LEO	Success
13	June 18, 2024; 07:01	Mk21A reentry vehicle test	Vandenberg TP-01	Suborbital	Success

== See also ==
- Comparison of orbital launchers families
- Comparison of orbital launch systems
