= Vandenberg Space Launch Complex 8 =

Rocket launch pad

Space Launch Complex 8
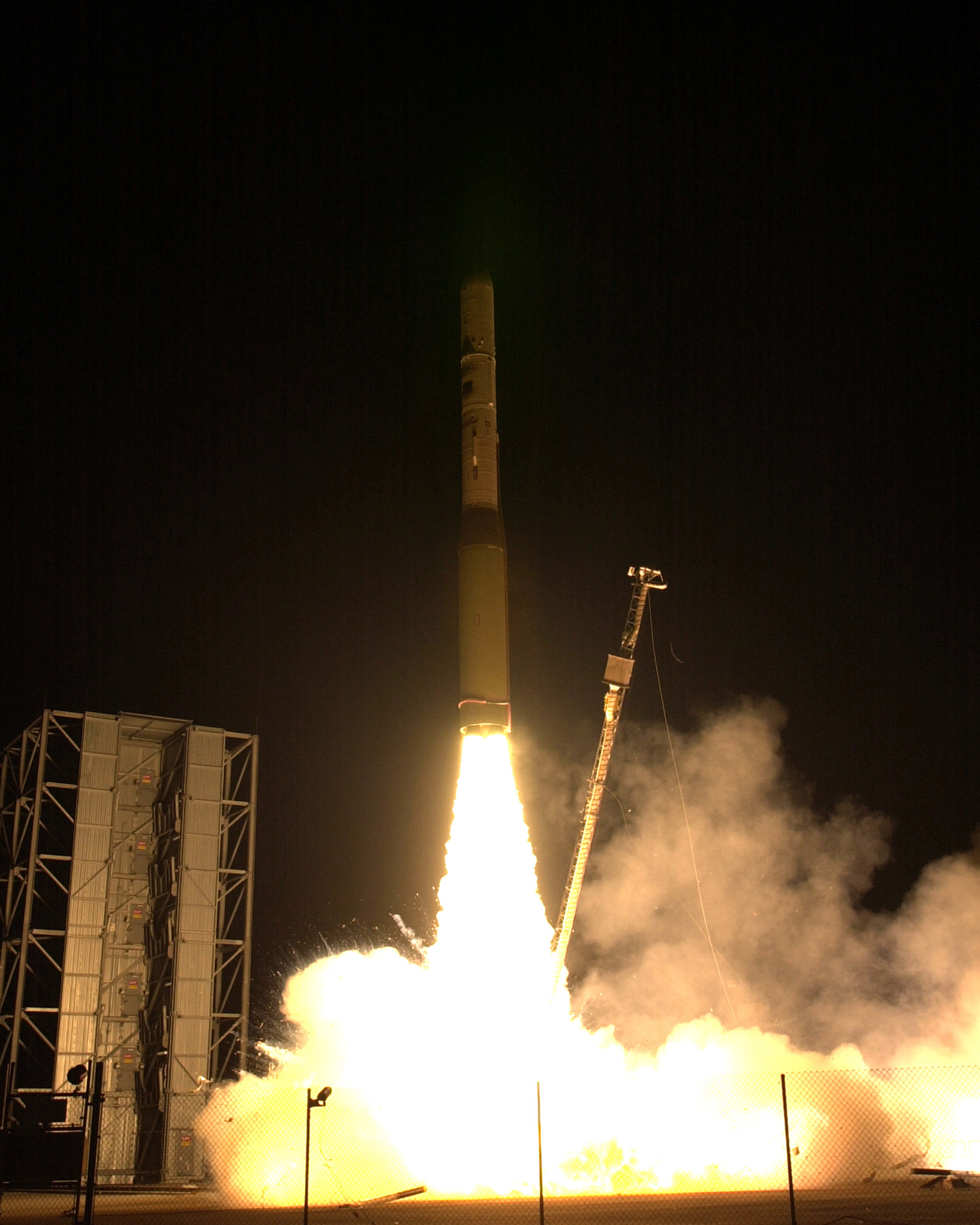
- A Minotaur rocket launches Streak from SLC-8.
- Interactive map of Space Launch Complex 8
- Launch site: Vandenberg Space Force Base
- Location: 34°34′34″N 120°37′57″W
- Time zone: UTC−08:00 (PST)
  - Summer (DST): UTC−07:00 (PDT)
- Short name: SLC-8
- Operator: United States Space Force (owner); Northrop Grumman (tenant)
- Launch pad: 1
- Orbital inclination range: 51° – 145°
Launch history
- Status: Active
- Launches: 11
- First launch: 27 January 2000; Minotaur I (JAWSat)
- Last launch: 7 April 2026; Minotaur IV (STP-S29A)
- Associated rockets: Current: Minotaur I, Minotaur IV; Plans cancelled: Athena I, Athena II

Launch sites at Vandenberg Space Force Base
Active pads
Active pads not used for launches
Inactive leased pads
Inactive unleased pads
1 SLC-1E
2 SLC-1W
3 SLC-2E
4 SLC-2W
5 SLC-10E
6 SLC-10W
7 LC-576E
8 SLC-9
9 SLC-3E
10 SLC-3W
11 SLC-4E
12 SLC-4W (LZ-4)
13 SLC-5
14 SLC-6
15 SLC-8
16 SLC-7
17 SLC-11
18 SLC-12
19 SLC-14
20 SLC-15

Space Launch Complex 8 (SLC-8), is a launch pad at Vandenberg Space Force Base in California, United States. It is currently only used by Minotaur rockets. It was originally part of the California Spaceport and was known as the Commercial Launch Facility (CLF) or Space Launch Facility (SLF). In addition to supporting occasional Minotaur rockets, SLC-8 is capable of hosting small launch vehicles thanks to a new clean pad built in 2019. Much like the Minotaur rocket family itself, SLC-8 has seen little use since the early 2010s.

As of April 2026, eleven rockets - six Minotaur I and five Minotaur IV - have been launched from SLC-8.

== Pad description ==
SLC-8 was built in the late 1990s to support Minotaur rockets from Vandenberg, and is the southernmost launch complex at the base. It is the fourth launch site at Vandenberg to support the Minotaur family, after TP-01, SLC-576E, and LF-06. Minotaur launches from SLC-8 are controlled from the Integrated Processing Facility (IPF) at the neighboring Space Launch Complex 6, which itself was originally built for Space Shuttle payload processing. Other launches from the complex can be controlled from a new launch control center at north Vandenberg.

Minotaur rockets are assembled and prepared for flight inside an 88-foot-tall mobile assembly gantry built around 2005. The Minotaur launch mount is rated for launch vehicles up to 150 tons in mass and one million pounds of thrust.

The clean pad, measuring 15 by 15 feet of reinforced concrete, is available for small launch vehicles of up to 20 tons in mass and was built in 2019. Two adjacent pads were also built to host fuel and oxidizer equipment. Companies using the pad must bring their own ground support equipment.

== Launch history ==
- Minotaur I
- Minotaur IV

All flights from 2000 to 2011 operated by Orbital Sciences Corporation. All flights since 2025 operated by Northrop Grumman.

| No. | Date | Time (UTC) | Launch vehicle | Payload | Result | Remarks |
|---|---|---|---|---|---|---|
| 1 | 27 January 2000 | 03:03 | Minotaur I | JAWSat | Success | Maiden flight of the Minotaur I. |
| 2 | 19 July 2000 | 20:09 | Minotaur I | MightySat II.1 | Success | |
| 3 | 11 April 2005 | 13:35 | Minotaur I | XSS-11 | Success | Proximity test operations satellite, also known as USA-165. Satellite bus design was later used for GRAIL. |
| 4 | 22 September 2005 | 19:24 | Minotaur I | Streak | Success | |
| 5 | 15 April 2006 | 01:40 | Minotaur I | COSMIC (FORMOSAT-3) | Success | |
| 6 | 22 April 2010 | 23:00 | Minotaur IV | HTV-2a | Success | Suborbital launch. Part of the Falcon Project by DARPA and the Air Force, aiming to develop a hypersonic weapon. Maiden flight of the Minotaur IV. Payload later failed during test. |
| 7 | 26 September 2010 | 04:41 | Minotaur IV | SSBS | Success | Maiden orbital flight of the Minotaur IV. |
| 8 | 6 February 2011 | 12:26 | Minotaur I | NROL-66 | Success | NRO launch. Rapid Pathfinder Prototype satellite for technology demonstration, also known as USA-225. First launch for the National Reconnaissance Office from SLC-8. |
| 9 | 11 August 2011 | 14:45 | Minotaur IV | HTV-2b | Success | Suborbital launch. Part of the Falcon Project by DARPA and the Air Force, aiming to develop a hypersonic weapon. Payload later failed during test. |
| 10 | 16 April 2025 | 19:33 | Minotaur IV | NROL-174 | Success | NRO launch. Two unknown satellites, also known as USA-521 and USA-522. First launch from SLC-8 following Orbital's merger with Alliant Techsystems and following Orbital ATK's purchase by Northrop Grumman. |
| 11 | 7 April 2026 | 11:33 | Minotaur IV | STP-S29A | Success | |
