= Pacific Spaceport Complex – Alaska =

Commercial rocket launch facility in Alaska

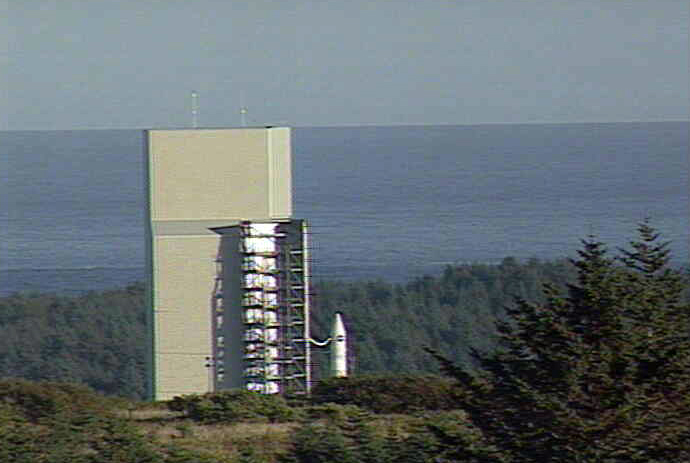
- Athena I vehicle with Kodiak Star mission outside the Launch Service Structure in 2001
- Interactive map of Pacific Spaceport Complex – Alaska
- Location: Kodiak Island, Alaska; United States
- Coordinates: 57°26′07″N 152°20′24″W
- Operator: Alaska Aerospace Corporation (Government of Alaska)
Launch history
- Launches: 31
- First launch: 6 November 1998
- Last launch: 10 January 2023
- Associated rockets: Athena I, Minotaur IV, Astra Rocket, RS1
Launch Pad 1 launch history
- Launches: 5
- First launch: 30 September 2001; Athena I
- Last launch: 22 August 2025; Unknown
- Associated rockets: Athena I Minotaur IV
Launch Pad 3B launch history
- Launches: 5
- First launch: 12 September 2020; Rocket 3.0
- Last launch: 15 March 2022; Rocket 3.3
- Associated rockets: Rocket 3
Launch Pad 3C launch history
- Launches: 1
- First launch: 10 January 2023; RS1
- Associated rockets: RS1

The Pacific Spaceport Complex – Alaska (PSCA), formerly known as the Kodiak Launch Complex (KLC), is a dual-use commercial and military spaceport for sub-orbital and orbital launch vehicles. The facility is owned and operated by the Alaska Aerospace Corporation, a corporation owned by the government of Alaska, and is located on Kodiak Island in Alaska. The Alaska Aerospace Corporation also owns and operates a sounding rocket site at the Poker Flat Research Range near Fairbanks.

The spaceport opened in 1998 and has supported 34 (up to January 2026) launches, most of those for the U.S. government. The site was closed for two years following a launch failure that caused significant damage to parts of the spaceport. It reopened in August 2016.

== History ==
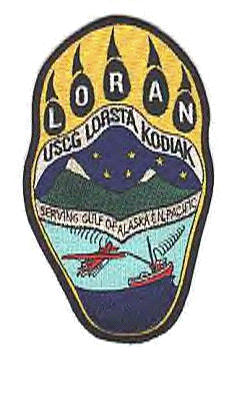
Patch of the U.S. Coast Guard LORAN Station Kodak (1976-2011), which the KLC was built around.

The site that would become the KLC was originally a U.S. Coast Guard LORAN station, originally "LORAN Station Narrow Cape" from 1976 to 1990, then "LORAN Station Kodak" from 1990 until its eventual decommissioning on May 25, 2010, with its structure left to fall into disrepair.

Following the incorporation of the Alaska Aerospace Development Corporation in 1991 by the Alaska State Legislature, plans were begun for the spaceport, known during development as the Alaska Orbital Launch Complex. Construction on the site began in January 1998, and the first launch took place in August 1998 from temporary accommodations at the site.

After a launch failure in August 2014 damaged the launch tower, payload processing facility and integrated processing facility, Alaska Aerospace made plans to repair and upgrade the facilities to support larger rockets, but Governor Bill Walker stopped work in December 2014 as part of an order to address a state budget shortfall. Repairs to the facility were funded by state insurance at a cost of US$26–29 million. During efforts to repair the facilities, the spaceport was formally renamed to "Pacific Spaceport Complex – Alaska" in an announcement made on 14 April 2015. The facility was formally re-dedicated on 13 August 2016, to celebrate the completion of repairs.

In mid-2016, the Alaska Aerospace Corporation "signed a multi-year contract with the Missile Defense Agency (MDA) for multiple launches from the PSCA through 2021". The arrangement includes a sole-source contract for two flight tests of the Terminal High Altitude Area Defense (THAAD) system. Two private companies, Rocket Lab and Vector Space Systems, were considering using the spaceport for commercial launches as early as 2019. Another private company, Eclipse Orbital, was working with the Alaska Aerospace Corporation to prepare for flight operations of their "Corona" launch vehicle in 2020. As of 2022, however, none of these companies have launched anything from Alaska.

Indian private space company Agnikul Cosmos signed a memorandum of agreement with Alaska Aerospace Corporation to test launch their Agnibaan rocket from the Pacific Spaceport Complex. The launch from Alaska was expected to take place from 2022 onwards. Under the agreement, Alaska Aerospace and AgniKul will work together to secure several regulatory approvals including US Federal Aviation Administration (FAA) launch licensing, US export control, and will comply with export laws & regulations in India to receive necessary clearances from the Indian authorities as well. The aim is to define launch vehicle-spaceport interfaces, related procedures and conduct at least one test launch from PSCA.

On 19 November 2021, Astra's LV0007 rocket achieved orbit from the Pacific Spaceport Complex.

== Launch facilities ==
The Kodiak spaceport has two launch pads with a mission control center that includes 64 workstations with high-speed communications and data links. There is a clean room for preparing satellites for launch, a fully enclosed 17-story-tall rocket assembly building and two independent range and telemetry systems. The complex sits on 3,700 acres (15 km^{2}) of state-owned land. Launch pad 1 is designed for orbital launches, while launch pad 2 is intended for sub-orbital launches.

In 2010, Alaska Aerospace Corp. developed a concept plan for a third launch pad, which would allow the facility to support quick launches of satellites: under 24 hours to launch from "go ahead".

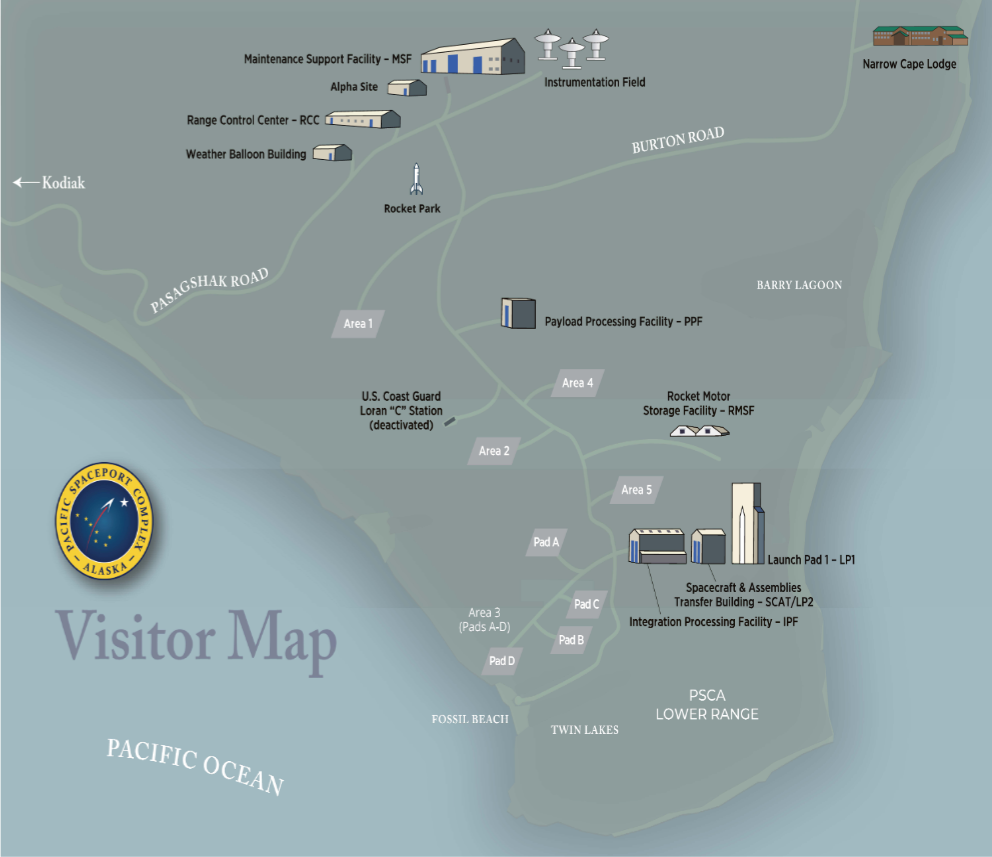
A 2024 map of the launch facilities published by the Federal Aviation Administration

== Launch history ==
The first orbital launch from the PSCA was an Athena I rocket which carried out the Kodiak Star mission for NASA and the Space Test Program, launching Starshine 3, Sapphire, PCSat, and PICOSatS on 30 September 2001.

Launches from Kodiak Launch Complex
No.	Date (UTC)	Vehicle	Payload	Pad	Orbital/Suborbital	Result	Remarks
1	6 November 1998; 01:32	First stage: Aerojet SR-19-AJ-1; Second stage: Hercules M57A1	ait-1	LP-2	Suborbital	Success	Mission for the U.S. Air Force. Carried various experiments and instruments, including a "Global Positioning System antenna, Honeywell GPS Measure Unit, Electromagnetic Radio Tomography experiment, Langmuir probe and an Air Force nosetip".
2	15 September 1999; 21:00	First stage: Castor 4B; Second stage: Hercules M57A1	ait-2	LP-2	Suborbital	Success	Mission for the U.S. Air Force. Carried various experiments and instruments, including a Langmuir probe, the Boston Rocket Ionospheric Tomography Experiment, an interceptor seeker, and calibration equipment.
3	22 March 2001	Aries 47	QRLV-1	LP-2	Suborbital	Success	Mission for the U.S. Air Force.
4	30 September 2001; 02:40	Athena I (LM-001)	Starshine 3; SAPPHIRE; PCSat; PicoSAT	LP-1	Orbital	Success	Kodiak Star mission for Lockheed/NASA; first orbital launch from Kodiak.
5	9 November 2001; 18:12	Polaris A-3 STARS-1		LP-2	Suborbital	Failure	West Coast Risk-Reduction Flight (WCRRF) for the U.S. Army. Rocket exploded 56 seconds after launch.
6	24 April 2002	Aries 49	QRLV-2	LP-2	Suborbital	Success	Mission for the U.S. Air Force.
7	15 December 2004; 04:45	Polaris A-3 STARS-1		LP-2	Suborbital	Failure	IFT-13c mission for Missile Defense Agency (MDA). Target successfully launched from Kodiak, but interceptor failed to launch from Kwajalein.
8	14 February 2005; 06:22	Polaris A-3 STARS-1		LP-2	Suborbital	Failure	IFT-14 mission for MDA. Target successfully launched from Kodiak, but interceptor failed to launch from Kwajalein.
9	23 February 2006; 16:09	Polaris A-3 STARS-1		LP-2	Suborbital	Success	FTX-01 mission for MDA.
10	1 September 2006; 17:22	Polaris A-3 STARS-1		LP-2	Suborbital	Success	FTG-02 mission for MDA. Both the target at Kodiak and interceptor at Kwajalein successfully launched.
11	25 May 2007; 14:15	Polaris A-3 STARS-1		LP-2	Suborbital	Failure	FTG-03 mission for MDA. Target missile from Kodiak flew off course and interceptor was not launched.
12	28 September 2007; 20:01	Polaris A-3 STARS-1		LP-2	Suborbital	Success	FTG-03a mission for MDA. Successful intercept.
13	18 July 2008; 22:47	Polaris A-3 STARS-1		LP-2	Suborbital	Success	FTX-03 mission for MDA. Target launched from Kodiak was tracked by land-based, sea-based and space-based tracking systems. Navy and Air Force units simulated interceptor shootdowns.
14	5 December 2008; 20:04	Polaris A-3 STARS-1		LP-2	Suborbital	Success	FTG-05 mission for MDA. Successful intercept of a target launched from Kodiak by an interceptor launched from Vandenberg Air Force Base.
15	20 November 2010; 01:25	Minotaur IV	STPSAT-2; FASTRAC-A; FASTRAC-B; FalconSat-5; FASTSAT; O/OREOS; RAX; NanoSail-D2	LP-1	Orbital	Success	STP-S26 mission for the U.S. Air Force. Included a Hydrazine Auxiliary Propulsion System (HAPS) to move vehicle to a secondary orbit after ejecting payloads.
16	27 September 2011; 15:49	Minotaur IV+	TacSat-4	LP-1	Orbital	Success	Mission for the U.S. Air Force.
17	25 August 2014; ~08:00	Polaris STARS IV	Advanced Hypersonic Weapon	LP-2	Suborbital	Failure	Flight Test 2 for the U.S. Army's AHW program. Flight terminated by range safety four seconds after launch due to rocket anomaly. Kodiak's LP-1 launch tower, payload processing facility, and integrated processing facility suffered damage due to the termination.
18	June 2017	Unknown	Unknown	Unknown	Suborbital	Unknown	FTT-18 mission for the MDA
19	July 2017	Unknown	Unknown	Unknown	Suborbital	Unknown	FET-01 mission for the MDA
20	20 July 2018	Astra Rocket 1.0	Unknown	LP-2	Suborbital	Failure	P120 mission for a commercial sponsor Astra
21	29 November 2018	Astra Rocket 2.0	Unknown	LP-2	Suborbital	Failure	Private commercial mission for Astra
22	26 July 2019	Arrow III		LP-2	Suborbital	Success	In a joint Israeli-American test conducted by the Israeli Air Force and Missile Defense Agency, the Arrow 3 system successfully intercepted 3 "enemy" rockets, one of them outside the atmosphere. The tests demonstrated Arrow 3's ability to intercept exo-atmospheric targets.
23	26 July 2019	Arrow III		LP-2	Suborbital	Success	In a joint Israeli-American test conducted by the Israeli Air Force and Missile Defense Agency, the Arrow 3 system successfully intercepted 3 "enemy" rockets, one of them outside the atmosphere. The tests demonstrated Arrow 3's ability to intercept exo-atmospheric targets.
24	26 July 2019	Arrow III		LP-2	Suborbital	Success	In a joint Israeli-American test conducted by the Israeli Air Force and Missile Defense Agency, the Arrow 3 system successfully intercepted 3 "enemy" rockets, one of them outside the atmosphere. The tests demonstrated Arrow 3's ability to intercept exo-atmospheric targets.
25	12 September 2020; 03:19	Rocket 3		LP-3B	Orbital	Failure	First test mission for the Astra Rocket 3.
26	15 December 2020; 20:55	Rocket 3		LP-3B	Orbital	Failure	Second test mission for the Astra Rocket 3, reaching all planned objectives (count and liftoff; reaching Max Q; nominal first-stage engine cutoff) but not making it into orbit.
27	28 August 2021; 22:35	Rocket 3	STP-27AD1	LP-3B	Orbital	Failure	First commercial Rocket 3 launch, and first of two demonstration launches for the U.S. Space Force. The rocket was terminated at main engine cut-off due to anomalies during flight.
28	21 October 2021	Unknown	FT-3	LP-1	Suborbital	Failure	Hypersonic Flight Test-3. Launch failed due to booster failure.
29	20 November 2021; 06:16	Rocket 3	STP-27AD2	LP-3B	Orbital	Success	Second of two demonstration launches for the U.S. Space Force and first Rocket 3 successful launch.
30	15 March 2022; 16:22	Rocket 3	S4 CROSSOVER, OreSat0, SpaceBEE × 16	LP-3B	Orbital	Success	S4 CROSSOVER remained attached to the second stage, which was intended.
31	10 January 2023; 23:27	RS1	VariSat-1A, 1B	LP-3C	Orbital	Failure	Maiden flight of RS1 and first launch from LP-3C. The launch resulted in a failure.
32	2024						
33	2024						
34	22 August 2025; 06:10	Unknown	FT-3	LP-1	Suborbital	Success	This launch was a repeat of the failed FT-3 test from 2021

- Additional sources: Center for Defense Information, Missile Defense Agency

The list above contains all launches, orbital and suborbital, up to August 2025.
