= Space Test Program =

US DoD space access program

The Space Test Program (STP) is the primary provider of spaceflight for the United States Department of Defense (DoD) space science and technology community. STP is managed by a group within the Advanced Systems and Development Directorate, a directorate of the Space and Missile Systems Center of the United States Space Force. STP provides spaceflight via the International Space Station (ISS), piggybacks, secondary payloads and dedicated launch services.

STP has actually been in existence for 50 years as of 2019, and has been responsible for several thousand launches. For example, the initial experiments that led to the modern Global Positioning System (GPS) satellite constellation were STP-launched projects. Its predecessor was SATAR.

== Past activities ==
=== Missions ===
Launch designation	Satellite designation	Date/time, UTC	Launch site	Rocket	Orbit	Function	Status	Patch	Remarks
STP-1	ASTRO, NEXTSat-CSC, STPSat 1, CFESat, MidSTAR 1 & FalconSat 3	9 March 2007	CCSFS, SLC-41	Atlas V 401	Low Earth	Various	Entered service, status unknown		
STP-2	DSX, Formosat 7A-7F, GPIM, OTB-1, NPSat 1, Oculus-ASR, Prox-1, LightSail 2, ARMADILLO, FalconSat-7, E-TBEx A,B, PSat 2, BRICSat 2, Prometheus 2.6, Prometheus Mass Model, TEPEC 1,2, CP 9 (LEO), StangSat	25 June 2019	KSC, LC-39A	Falcon Heavy	Low Earth	Various	Entered service, status unknown		
STP-3	STPSat-6, LDPE-1 & Ascent	7 December 2021	CCSFS, SLC-41	Atlas V 551	Geosynchronous	Various	Entered service, status unknown		
STP-5	SIRI-3 & PUMA	2026	CCSFS, SLC-41	Vulcan Centaur	Low Earth		Various	Planned	

=== 2001 ===
During August 2001, STP conducted two successful activities using the Space Shuttle and ISS. STS-105 delivered and successfully deployed the Materials International Space Station Experiment (MISSE) externally on the ISS. MISSE was a passive materials exposure experiment, was the first external experiment on ISS. In addition, STS-105 retrieved and returned MACE II (Middeck Active Control Experiment II) from the ISS. MACE II was the first internal experiment on ISS and was operated for nearly a year.

On 30 September 2001, STP and NASA launched the Kodiak Star mission on an Athena I launch vehicle. This was the first orbital launch out of Kodiak Island, Alaska. In addition to NASA's Starshine III spacecraft, this mission included three small DoD spacecraft which tested a variety of new space technologies.

STP and the Air Force Research Laboratory's (AFRL) Space Vehicles Directorate developed a secondary payload adapter ring for the Evolved Expendable Launch Vehicle (EELV), which can host up to six 180 kg (400 lb) microsatellites. STP also worked closely with NASA and the United States Navy on the Geosynchronous Imaging Fourier Transform Spectrometer / Indian Ocean Meteorology and Oceanography Imager project.

In December 2001, STS-108 hosted the Shuttle Ionospheric Modification with Pulsed Localized Exhaust (SIMPLEX) experiment. SIMPLEX observed ionospheric disturbances created by the Space Shuttle engine burns via ground radar sites and supported plume technology, plume signature, and space weather modeling.

=== 2002 ===
SIMPLEX flew again on STS-110 in April 2002. STP also worked to obtain a 1-year radio frequency license extension for the Picosat experiment launched on the Kodiak Star mission, in September 2001.

=== 2003 ===
On 6 January 2003, STP and the Naval Research Laboratory (NRL) launched the Coriolis satellite, a risk-reduction effort for NPOESS, aboard a Titan II launch vehicle.

=== 2007 ===
On 9 March 2007, six satellites were launched into low Earth Orbit (LEO) on a shared Atlas V launch vehicle on the STP-1 mission. The satellites were:

- Orbital Express: ASTRO and NextSat, (DARPA)
- MidSTAR-1, (United States Naval Academy)
- FalconSat3, (United States Air Force Academy)
- STPSat 1, USAF's Space Test Program
- CFESat, (Los Alamos National Laboratory)

The satellites shared the launcher through use of an Evolved Expendable Launch Vehicle Secondary Payload Adapter (ESPA). United Launch Alliance provided a video feed of the launch.

=== 2008 ===
The C/NOFS (Communications/Navigation Outage Forecasting System) satellite, which was launched on 16 April 2008, was operated by the Space Test Program.

=== 2010 ===
The third Minotaur IV, known as STP-S26, was successfully launched in November 2010. This was the 26th small launch vehicle mission in STP's 40-year history of flying DoD space experiments, STP-S26 launched at 01:45 UTC on 20 November 2010 from the Kodiak Launch Complex. The launch facility contractor was Alaska Aerospace Corporation (AAC). The payloads were released in a 650 km (400 mi) orbit, before the Hydrazine Auxiliary Propulsion System (HAPS) upper stage, by Orbital Sciences Corporation, was demonstrated by deploying two ballast payloads into a 1,200 km (750 mi) orbit. The payload included the STPSat-2 spacecraft. STPSat-2 had 3 three experimental payloads: SPEX (Space Phenomenology Experiment) consisting of two payloads to evaluate sensor compatibility for the space environment, and ODTML (Ocean Data Telemetry MicroSatLink) a two-way data relay from terrestrial (ocean or land) sensors to users.

=== 2013 ===
STPSat 3 is a copy of the STPSat-2 satellite, adapted to carry six experiments, including a module designed to host various space situational awareness sensors and a pair of space environment sensors. STPSat 3 launched on 19 November 2013, on the ORS-3 Minotaur 1 launch, along with 28 CubeSats. STPSat-3 carries five payloads, including "Integrated Miniaturized Electrostatic Analyzer Reflight (iMESA-R), Joint Component Research (J-CORE), Strip Sensor Unit (SSU), Small Wind and Temperature Spectrometer (SWATS), and TSI Calibration Transfer Experiment (TCTE)". It also carries a de-orbit module.

=== 2014 ===
As announced on 14 October 2014, the United States Department of Defense awarded Sierra Nevada Corporation's Space Systems (previously known as SpaceDev) with a contract to develop and build a next-generation science and technology demonstration satellite, known as STPSat-5, for their Space Test Program.

=== 2019 ===
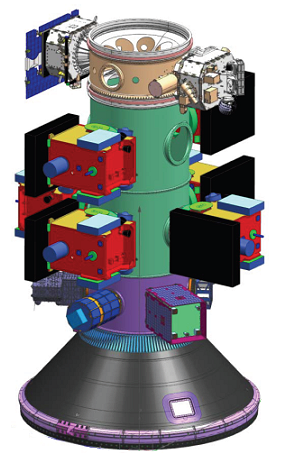
STP-2 payload stack.

The STP-2 (DoD Space Test Program) payload launched aboard a SpaceX Falcon Heavy on 25 June 2019.

Included was COSMIC-2, a cluster of six satellites, with a mass of 277.8 kg (612 lb) each. The primary role of the COSMIC-2 satellite constellation is to provide radio occultation data with an average latency of 45 minutes. The six satellites were placed on an orbit with an inclination of 24° to 28.5° with plans for them to move eventually to six separate orbital planes with 60° separation between them. The payload stack was integrated using an ESPA ring. Two ESPA Grande rings were used to mount the six COSMIC-2 satellites beneath the upper payload adapter hosting the DSX payload and avionics modules.

STP-2 also deployed a number of CubeSats as secondary payloads, including E-TBEx, PSAT, TEPCE, and ELaNa 15 CubeSats. LightSail 2 is carried by the Prox-1 nanosatellite. Other satellites and payloads included Oculus-ASR nanosatellite, GPIM, and the Deep Space Atomic Clock.

The STPSat-4 satellite was launched on 2 November 2019 onboard the Cygnus NG-12 mission and was subsequently deployed to orbit from the ISS on 29 January 2020. The satellite hosted a variety of experimental technologies, including: iMESA-R, a USAF mission to measure plasma densities and energies; MATRS, a modular solar array that partially failed to deploy; NISTEx, an inferometric star tracker; NTE, a passive retroreflector. The satellite decayed from orbit on 4 October 2022.

=== 2021 ===
(SpaceX had bid a Falcon Heavy in December 2016 for this launch.) The STP-3 mission was originally scheduled to be launched on a ULA Atlas V 551 launch vehicle in 2020. It was launched on 7 December 2021 at 10:19 UTC.

STP-3 includes the STPSat-6 satellite with the Space and Atmospheric Burst Reporting System-3 (SABRS-3) for National Nuclear Security Administration (NNSA), Laser Communications Relay Demonstration (LCRD) payload for NASA, and seven secondary payloads for the U.S. Air Force. STPSat-6 is destined for an orbit slightly above the geostationary orbit.

=== 2023 ===
The STP-27VPD mission was launched on LauncherOne's first mission from Spaceport Cornwall (and last mission overall) on 9 January 2023. The launch resulted in a failure, with the rocket and all its payloads being destroyed in-flight. The mission consisted of two pairs of cubesats from both British and American agencies. The CIRCE 1 and 2 cubesats were developed by the DSTL and the NRL using 6U platforms provided by Blue Canyon Technologies, and they would've flown in formation to study short-timescale dynamics in the ionosphere. The Prometheus 2A and 2B cubesats have been built by In-Space Missions for the UK Ministry of Defence and the NRO and they would've provided a test platform for monitoring radio signals.

The STP-CR2301 mission was successfully launched on a Falcon 9 Block 5 rocket on 12 June 2023 as part of the Transporter-8 rideshare mission. The mission consisted of two Modular Intelligence, Surveillance, and Reconnaissance (MISR) cubesats to demonstrate two-way communications with ground devices and the XVI cubesat to test the capacity of the Link-16 network to communicate to space.
