= Hydroxyl-terminated polybutadiene =

Chemical compound

Hydroxyl-terminated polybutadiene (HTPB) is an oligomer of butadiene terminated at each end with a hydroxyl functional group. It reacts with isocyanates to form polyurethane polymers.

HTPB is a translucent liquid with a color similar to wax paper and a viscosity similar to corn syrup. The properties vary because HTPB is a mixture rather than a pure compound, and it is manufactured to meet customers' specific requirements. A typical HTPB is R-45HTLO. This product consists of oligomeric units typically containing 40–50 butadiene molecules bonded together, with each end of the chain terminated with a hydroxyl [OH] group:

R-45HTLO has a functionality of 2.4-2.6, which means that there is (approximately) one additional hydroxyl group located along the chain for every two oligomeric units. This provides side-to-side linkage for a stronger cured product. HTPB is usually cured by an addition reaction with di- or poly-isocyanate compounds.

== Uses ==
=== Materials production ===
Polyurethanes prepared from HTPB can be engineered for specific physical properties; polyurethanes may be highly elastic or tough and rigid. Some products include: rigid foam insulation panels; durable elastomeric wheels and tires (used for roller coasters, escalators, skateboards, etc.); automotive suspension bushings; electrical potting compounds; high-performance adhesives; surface coatings and surface sealants; synthetic fibers (e.g., Spandex); carpet underlay; hard-plastic parts (e.g., for electronic instruments).

=== Rocket propellant ===
An important application of HTPB is in solid rocket propellant. It binds the oxidizing agent, fuel and other ingredients into a solid but elastic mass in most composite propellant systems. The cured polyurethane acts as a fuel in such mixtures. For example, HTPB is used in all 3/4 stages of the Japanese M-5 launch vehicles and in 1/3 stages of the Indian PSLV launch vehicle. JAXA describes the propellant as "HTPB/AP/Al=12/68/20", which means, proportioned by mass, HTPB plus curative 12% (binder and fuel), ammonium perchlorate 68% (oxidizer), and aluminum powder 20% (fuel).

Similar propellants, often referred to as APCP (ammonium perchlorate composite propellant) are used in larger model rockets. A typical APCP propellant mixture produces 2–3 times the specific impulse of the black powder propellant used in most smaller rocket motors.

HTPB is also used as a hybrid rocket fuel. With N_{2}O (nitrous oxide, or "laughing gas") as the oxidizer, it is used to power the SpaceShipTwo hybrid rocket motor developed by SpaceDev. The land speed record attempt Bloodhound LSR was intended to use HTPB with a high-test peroxide oxidizer, but that plan was altered in 2017.

== See also ==
- Polybutadiene acrylonitrile
