= Minotaur (rocket family) =

Family of American rockets

The Minotaur is a family of United States solid-fuel launch vehicles derived from retired Minuteman and Peacekeeper intercontinental ballistic missiles (ICBM). Built by Northrop Grumman under the U.S. Space Force's Rocket Systems Launch Program, the vehicles are used for orbital and suborbital missions.

The Minotaur family consists of four primary variants: the Minotaur I, used for launching small satellites into low Earth orbit; the Minotaur II, used primarily as a suborbital target vehicle; the Minotaur IV, a small-lift orbital launch vehicle; and the Minotaur V and Minotaur VI, capable of higher-energy missions including geostationary transfer orbit and trans-lunar trajectories. Minotaur I and II are derived from the LGM-30 Minuteman ICBM, while Minotaur IV, V, VI and the cancelled Minotaur III are based on the LGM-118 Peacekeeper ICBM.

== Vehicles ==
=== Minotaur-C (Taurus) ===
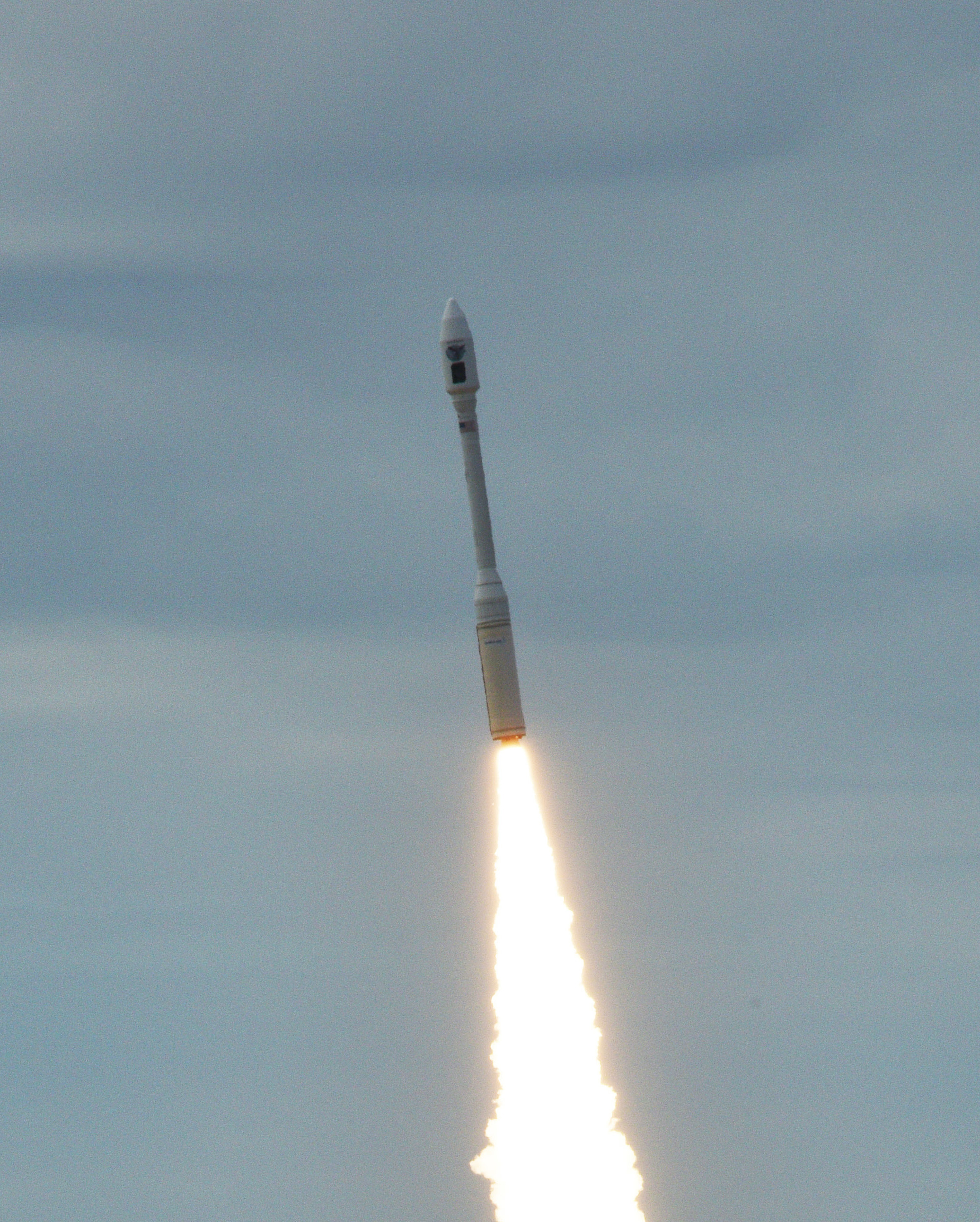
Minotaur-C

The Taurus launch vehicle, later renamed Minotaur-C (for "Minotaur-Commercial"), was the first of the Minotaur family and the first ground-launched orbital booster developed by Orbital Sciences Corporation (OSC). It was derived by adding a solid booster stage to the air-launched Pegasus rocket.

The first flight, sponsored by DARPA, occurred in 1994. Following a series of failures between 2001 and 2011, the vehicle was rebranded as Minotaur-C in 2014. Due to restrictions on the commercial use of government-furnished hardware, Minotaur-C is the only Minotaur vehicle available for commercial launches.

=== Minotaur I ===
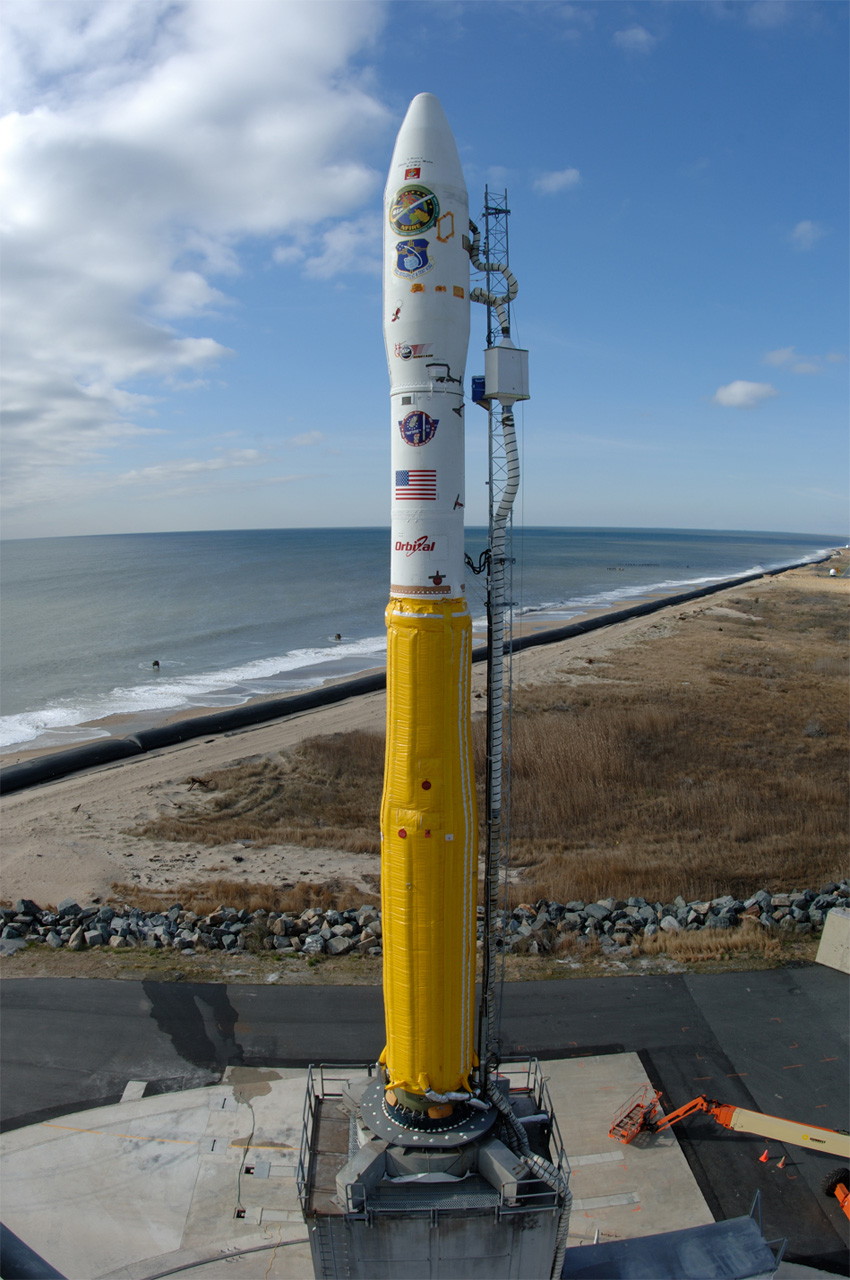
Minotaur I

The original Minotaur launch vehicle consists of an M55A1 first stage, SR19 second stage, Orion 50XL third stage, Orion 38 fourth stage, and an optional HAPS fifth stage for velocity trimming and multiple payload deployment. It can deliver 580 kilograms (1,280 lb) to a 185 kilometres (115 mi) orbit at 28.5° inclination from Cape Canaveral, or 310 kilograms (680 lb) to a 740 kilometres (460 mi) Sun-synchronous orbit from Vandenberg.

=== Minotaur II ===
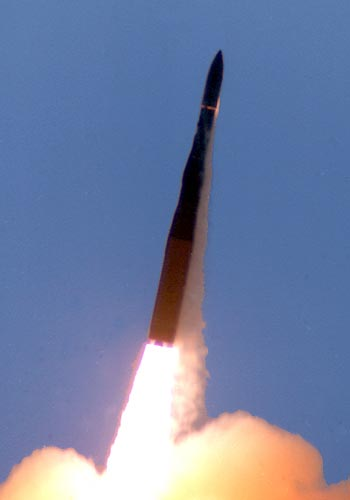
Minotaur II

The Minotaur II is a suborbital target vehicle derived from the Minuteman II missile, incorporating Orbital guidance and control systems. It consists of an M55A1 first stage, SR19 second stage, and M57 third stage, and can carry a payload of 460 kilograms (1,010 lb) on a 6,700 kilometres (4,200 mi) suborbital trajectory.

=== Minotaur III ===
The Minotaur III was a proposed suborbital target vehicle consisting of an SR118 first stage, SR119 second stage, SR120 third stage, and Super HAPS fourth stage. It was designed to carry 3,060 kilograms (6,750 lb) on a 6,700 kilometres (4,200 mi) suborbital trajectory. Development was cancelled and the vehicle was never flown.

=== Minotaur IV ===
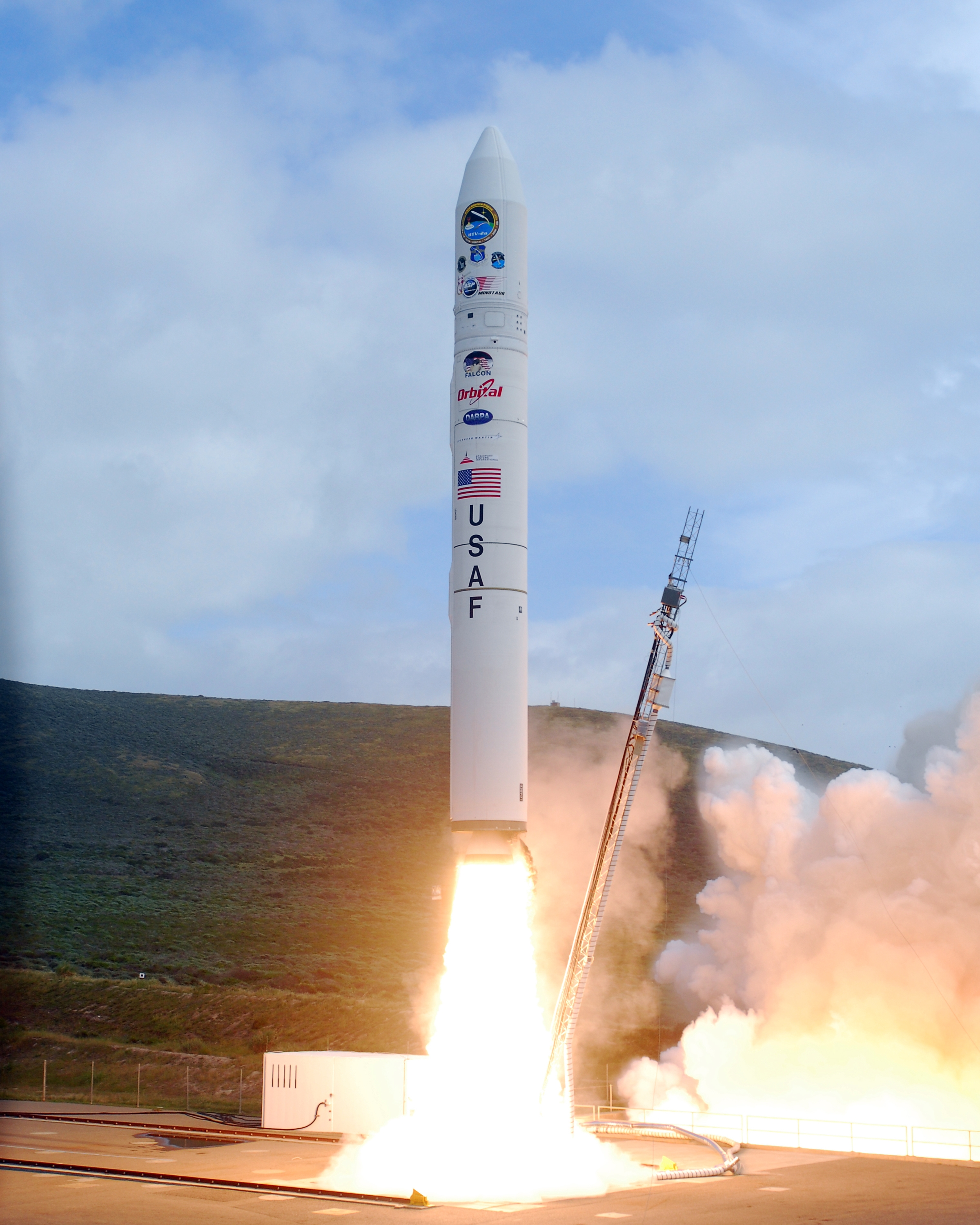
Minotaur IV

The Minotaur IV combines decommissioned Peacekeeper solid rocket motors with technologies from other Orbital-built launch vehicles, including Minotaur I, Pegasus, and Taurus. It consists of an SR118 first stage, SR119 second stage, SR120 third stage, and Orion 38 fourth stage. It can deliver 1,735 kilograms (3,825 lb) to a 185 kilometres (115 mi) orbit at 28.5° inclination from Cape Canaveral.

The first launch occurred on April 22, 2010, from Vandenberg in California. The vehicle has also been used in support of the U.S. Air Force's Conventional Prompt Global Strike (CPGS) program.

=== Minotaur V ===
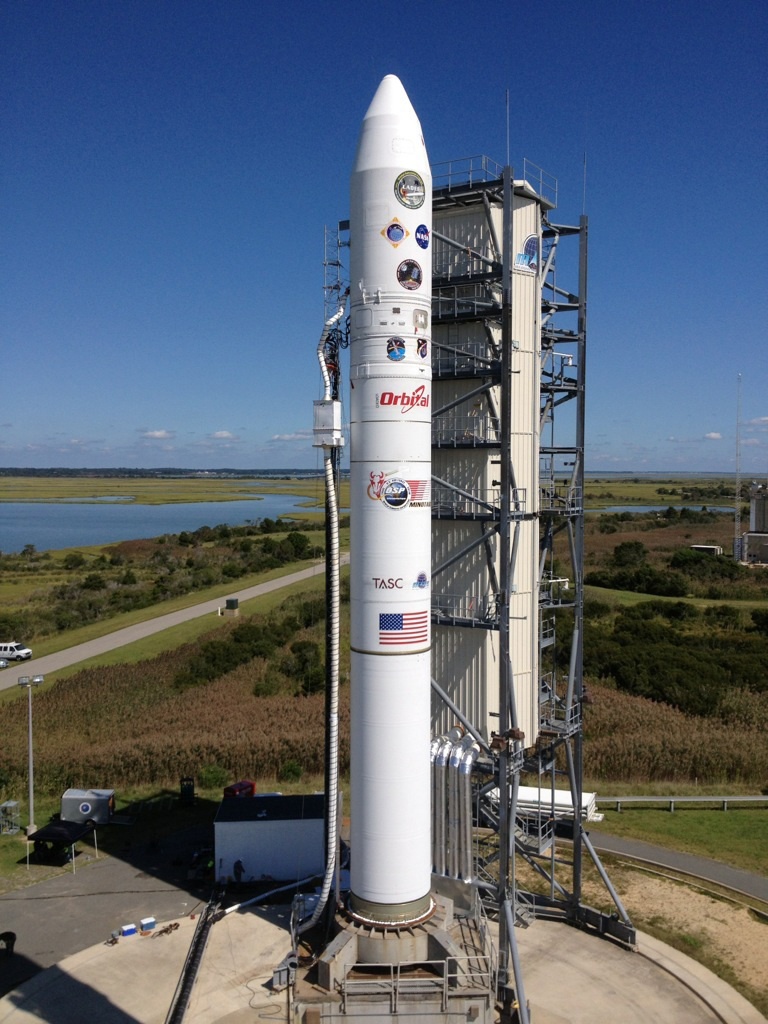
Minotaur V

The Minotaur V is a five-stage variant based on the Minotaur IV+, incorporating an additional upper stage for missions to geostationary transfer orbit, lunar trajectories, and interplanetary destinations.

NASA's Lunar Atmosphere and Dust Environment Explorer (LADEE) was launched on the first Minotaur V from the Wallops Flight Facility in Virginia at 03:27 UTC on September 7, 2013. The vehicle placed LADEE into a highly elliptical orbit to enable phasing for lunar transfer.

=== Minotaur VI ===
The Minotaur VI is a proposed five-stage launch vehicle developed by Northrop Grumman that, as of 2025, has not flown. It is based on the Minotaur IV+, with the addition of a second SR-118 first stage to increase performance. An enhanced variant, Minotaur VI+, is also proposed for beyond low Earth orbit missions, incorporating an additional Star 37FM sixth stage. This configuration is projected to deliver up to 300 kilograms (660 lb) to Mars.

== Launch statistics ==
=== Rocket configurations ===
- Minotaur-C
- Minotaur I
- Minotaur II
- Minotaur II+
- Minotaur IV
- Minotaur IV Lite
- Minotaur IV HAPS
- Minotaur IV+
- Minotaur V

=== Launch sites ===
- Vandenberg, LF-06
- Vandenberg, SLC-8
- Vandenberg, SLC-576E
- Vandenberg, TP-01
- Kodiak Island, LP-1
- Cape Canaveral, SLC-46
- MARS, LP-0B

=== Launch outcomes ===
- Success
- Failure
- Planned

== Launch history ==
=== 1994 ===
Flight No.	Date and time (UTC)	Rocket configuration	Launch site	Payload	Orbit	Customer	Launch outcome
1	March 13, 1994; 22:32	Minotaur-C	Vandenberg, SLC-576E	STEP Mission 0 and DARPASAT		USAF/DARPA	Success
=== 1998 ===
Flight No.	Date and time (UTC)	Rocket configuration	Launch site	Payload	Orbit	Customer	Launch outcome
2	February 10, 1998; 13:20	Minotaur-C	Vandenberg, SLC-576E	GFO and Orbcomm (satellites 11,12)			Success
3	October 3, 1998; 10:04	Minotaur-C	Vandenberg, SLC-576E	Space Technology Experiment (STEX)		NRO	Success
=== 1999 ===
Flight No.	Date and time (UTC)	Rocket configuration	Launch site	Payload	Orbit	Customer	Launch outcome
4	December 21, 1999; 07:13	Minotaur-C	Vandenberg, SLC-576E	KOMPSAT and ACRIMSAT			Success
=== 2000 ===
Flight No.	Date and time (UTC)	Rocket configuration	Launch site	Payload	Orbit	Customer	Launch outcome
5	January 27, 2000; 03:03:06	Minotaur I	Vandenberg, SLC-8	JAWSat (P98-1) (FalconSat1 / ASUSat1 / OCSE / OPAL)	LEO		Success
6	March 12, 2000; 09:29	Minotaur-C	Vandenberg, SLC-576E	Multispectral Thermal Imager (MTI)			Success
7	May 28, 2000; 20:00	Minotaur II	Vandenberg, LF-06	OSP-TLV Missile Defense Technology Demonstrator	Suborbital		Success
8	July 19, 2000; 20:09:00	Minotaur I	Vandenberg, SLC-8	MightySat II.1 (Sindri, P99-1) / MEMS 2A / MEMS 2B	LEO		Success
=== 2001 ===
Flight No.	Date and time (UTC)	Rocket configuration	Launch site	Payload	Orbit	Customer	Launch outcome
9	September 21, 2001; 18:49	Minotaur-C	Vandenberg, SLC-576E	Orbview-4/QuikTOMS			Failure
10	December 4, 2001; 04:59	Minotaur II	Vandenberg, LF-06	TLV-1 IFT-7 GMDS target mission	Suborbital		Success
=== 2002 ===
Flight No.	Date and time (UTC)	Rocket configuration	Launch site	Payload	Orbit	Customer	Launch outcome
11	March 16, 2002; 02:11	Minotaur II	Vandenberg, LF-06	TLV-2 IFT-8 GMDS target mission	Suborbital		Success
12	October 15, 2002; 02:01	Minotaur II	Vandenberg, LF-06	TLV-3 GMDS target mission	Suborbital		Success
13	December 11, 2002; 08:26	Minotaur II	Vandenberg, LF-06	TLV-4 GMDS target mission	Suborbital		Success
=== 2004 ===
Flight No.	Date and time (UTC)	Rocket configuration	Launch site	Payload	Orbit	Customer	Launch outcome
14	May 20, 2004; 17:47	Minotaur-C	Vandenberg, SLC-576E	ROCSAT-2			Success
=== 2005 ===
Flight No.	Date / time (UTC)	Rocket, Configuration	Launch site	Payload	Orbit	Customer	Launch outcome
15	April 11, 2005; 13:35:00	Minotaur I	Vandenberg, SLC-8	XSS-11	LEO		Success
16	September 22, 2005; 19:24:00	Minotaur I	Vandenberg, SLC-8	Streak (STP-R1)	LEO		Success
=== 2006 ===
Flight No.	Date and time (UTC)	Rocket configuration	Launch site	Payload	Orbit	Customer	Launch outcome
17	April 15, 2006; 01:40:00	Minotaur I	Vandenberg, SLC-8	COSMIC (FORMOSAT-3)	LEO		Success
18	December 16, 2006; 12:00	Minotaur I	MARS, LP-0B	TacSat-2 / GeneSat-1	LEO		Success
=== 2007 ===
Flight No.	Date and time (UTC)	Rocket configuration	Launch site	Payload	Orbit	Customer	Launch outcome
19	March 21, 2007; 04:27	Minotaur II	Vandenberg, LF-06	TLV-5 FTX-02 SBR target mission	Suborbital		Success
20	April 24, 2007; 06:48	Minotaur I	MARS, LP-0B	NFIRE	LEO		Success
21	August 23, 2007; 08:30	Minotaur II+	Vandenberg, LF-06	TLV-7 Mission 2a sensor target for NFIRE satellite	Suborbital		Success
=== 2008 ===
Flight No.	Date and time (UTC)	Rocket configuration	Launch site	Payload	Orbit	Customer	Launch outcome
22	September 24, 2008; 06:57	Minotaur II+	Vandenberg, LF-06	TLV-8 Mission 2b sensor target for NFIRE satellite	Suborbital		Success
=== 2009 ===
Flight No.	Date and time (UTC)	Rocket configuration	Launch site	Payload	Orbit	Customer	Launch outcome
23	February 24, 2009; 09:55	Minotaur-C	Vandenberg, SLC-576E	Orbiting Carbon Observatory			Failure
24	May 19, 2009; 23:55	Minotaur I	MARS, LP-0B	TacSat-3 / PharmaSat / AeroCube 3 / HawkSat I / CP6	LEO		Success
=== 2010 ===
Flight No.	Date and time (UTC)	Rocket configuration	Launch site	Payload	Orbit	Customer	Launch outcome
25	April 22, 2010; 23:00	Minotaur IV Lite	Vandenberg, SLC-8	HTV-2a hypersonic research spacecraft	Suborbital		Success
26	September 26, 2010; 04:41	Minotaur IV	Vandenberg, SLC-8	SBSS	SSO		Success
27	November 20, 2010; 01:25	Minotaur IV HAPS	Kodiak Island, LP-1	STP-S26 (FASTRAC-A / FASTRAC-B / FalconSat-5 / FASTSAT / O/OREOS / RAX)	LEO		Success
=== 2011 ===
Flight No.	Date and time (UTC)	Rocket configuration	Launch site	Payload	Orbit	Customer	Launch outcome
28	February 6, 2011; 12:26	Minotaur I	Vandenberg, SLC-8	NROL-66	LEO		Success
29	March 4, 2011; 10:09	Minotaur-C	Vandenberg, SLC-576E	Glory, KySat-1, Hermes, and Explorer-1 [PRIME]			Failure
30	June 30, 2011; 03:09	Minotaur I	MARS, LP-0B	ORS-1	LEO		Success
31	August 11, 2011; 14:45	Minotaur IV Lite	Vandenberg, SLC-8	Falcon Hypersonic Technology Vehicle 2 (HTV-2b)	Suborbital		Success
32	September 27, 2011; 15:49	Minotaur IV+	Kodiak Island, LP-1	TacSat-4	MEO		Success
=== 2013 ===
Flight No.	Date and time (UTC)	Rocket configuration	Launch site	Payload	Orbit	Customer	Launch outcome
33	September 7, 2013; 03:27	Minotaur V	MARS, LP-0B	LADEE	HEO		Success
34	November 20, 2013; 01:15	Minotaur I	MARS, LP-0B	ORS-3 (STPSat-3 along with 28 additional cubesats)	LEO		Success
=== 2017 ===
Flight No.	Date and time (UTC)	Rocket configuration	Launch site	Payload	Orbit	Customer	Launch outcome
35	August 26, 2017; 06:04	Minotaur IV	Cape Canaveral, SLC-46	ORS-5	LEO		Success
36	October 31, 2017; 21:37	Minotaur-C	Vandenberg, SLC-576E	SkySat × 6, Flock-3m × 4			Success
=== 2020 ===
Flight No.	Date and time (UTC)	Rocket configuration	Launch site	Payload	Orbit	Customer	Launch outcome
37	July 15, 2020; 13:46	Minotaur IV	MARS, LP-0B	NROL-129 (USA 305 to USA 308)	LEO	NRO	Success
=== 2021 ===
Flight No.	Date and time (UTC)	Rocket configuration	Launch site	Payload	Orbit	Customer	Launch outcome
38	June 15, 2021; 13:35	Minotaur I	MARS, LP-0B	NROL-111 (USA 316 to USA 318)	LEO	NRO	Success
=== 2022 ===
Flight No.	Date and time (UTC)	Rocket configuration	Launch site	Payload	Orbit	Customer	Launch outcome
39	July 7, 2022; 06:01	Minotaur II+	Vandenberg, TP-01	Mk21A reentry vehicle	Suborbital	AFNWC	Failure
=== 2024 ===
Flight No.	Date and time (UTC)	Rocket configuration	Launch site	Payload	Orbit	Customer	Launch outcome
40	June 18, 2024; 07:01	Minotaur I	Vandenberg, TP-01	Mk21A reentry vehicle	Suborbital	AFNWC	Success
=== 2025 ===
Flight No.	Date and time (UTC)	Rocket configuration	Launch site	Payload	Orbit	Customer	Launch outcome
41	16 April 2025 19:33	Minotaur IV	Vandenberg, SLC-8	NROL-174	LEO	NRO	Success
=== 2026 ===
Flight No.	Date and time (UTC)	Rocket configuration	Launch site	Payload	Orbit	Customer	Launch outcome
42	7 April 2026, 11:33	Minotaur IV	Vandenberg, SLC-8	STPSat-7	LEO	United States Space Force	Success

== Planned launches ==
Date/Time (UTC)	Variant	Launch site	Payload	Trajectory	Remarks
NET 2026	Minotaur IV	Vandenberg, SLC‑8	EWS-OD 1	LEO	USSF-261S-A mission
TBD	Minotaur IV Lite	Vandenberg, SLC‑8	Conventional Strike Missile (CSM)	Suborbital	
TBD	Minotaur IV		?	LEO	ORS mission
TBD	Minotaur IV		?	LEO	ORS mission

== See also ==
- Dnepr, a converted Soviet ICBM often used for commercial satellite launches
- Modified Minotaur IV (Ascent Abort-2), Ascent Abort-2 (AA-2), was a suborbital flight to test the Launch Abort System (LAS) of NASA's Orion spacecraft. The suborbital flight used a modified Minotaur IV, launched July 2, 2019, at 11:00 UTC from CCAFS SLC-46. The suborbital flight was a success.
