= EcAMSat =

NASA research satellite (2017–2021)

- Mission type: Biological research
- Operator: Santa Clara University
- COSPAR ID: 1998-067NG
- SATCAT no.: 43019
- Website: EcAMSat
- Mission duration: 25 days 152.5 hr Main Experiment

Spacecraft properties
- Bus: NASA NanoSat 1.0 Bus
- Manufacturer: NASA
- Launch mass: 10.7 kilograms (24 lb)

Start of mission
- Launch date: 12 November 2017, 12:19 UTC
- Rocket: Antares 230
- Launch site: MARS LP-0A
- Contractor: Orbital ATK

End of mission
- Decay date: 8 December 2021

Orbital parameters
- Reference system: Geocentric
- Regime: Low Earth
- Perigee altitude: 405.7 kilometres (252.1 mi)
- Apogee altitude: 413.4 kilometres (256.9 mi)
- Inclination: 51.6 degrees
- Period: 92.6 minutes
- Epoch: 1 December 2017

EcAMSat, or E. coli AntiMicrobial Satellite, was NASA's first 6U CubeSat, developed to investigate the effects of microgravity on the antibiotic resistance of E. coli. The spacecraft was launched aboard an Orbital ATK Antares rocket from Wallops Flight Facility on 12 November 2017, and was deployed from the International Space Station on 20 November 2017.

== Background ==
During the development of the PharmaSat spacecraft, two identical flight units were built and brought to the launch site, with the FLT-2 unit being the one ultimately launched as "PharmaSat". The FLT-1 unit sat in storage, and was later put to use as a NASA Ames Research Center Mission of Opportunity (MoO) flight, selected for funding under the Stand Alone Missions of Opportunity program. Originally named "PharmaSat-ECAM", EcAMSat was developed from both legacy hardware and software from the PharmaSat mission.

EcAMSat was the fifth mission to utilize NASA Ames Research Center's NanoSat 1.0 bus, which has flown on GeneSat-1, PharmaSat, NanoSail-D2, and O/OREOS.

== Operations ==
EcAMSat was operated by Santa Clara University's Robotic Systems Lab in Santa Clara, California. After deployment, the first amateur radio beacon packets were received by amateur radio operator JA0CAW on 20 November 2017, and Santa Clara University closed the S-Band radio link for the first time on 21 November 2017.

EcAMSat transmitted an AX.25 beacon packet once every 5 seconds at 437.100 megahertz.

== See also ==
- CubeSat
- PharmaSat
- GeneSat-1
- O/OREOS
- NanoSail-D2
