= Minotaur II =

American suborbital rocket system

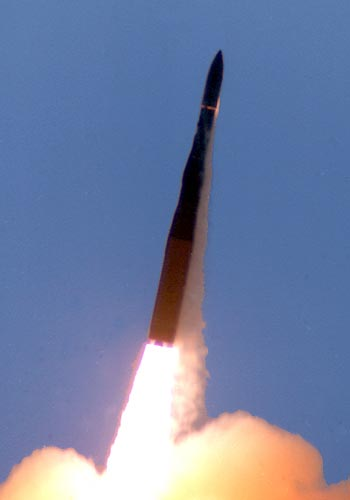
- Minotaur II launch from Vandenberg
- Function: Suborbital launch system
- Manufacturer: Orbital Sciences (2000–2015); Orbital ATK (2015–2018); Northrop Grumman (2018–present)
- Country of origin: United States

Size
- Height: 19.21 metres (63.0 ft)
- Diameter: 1.67 metres (5 ft 6 in)
- Mass: 36,200 kilograms (79,800 lb)
- Stages: 2 or 3

Capacity

Payload to 8000km S/O
- Mass: 400 kilograms (880 lb)

Launch history
- Status: Active
- Launch sites: Vandenberg, LF-6 & TP-01
- Total launches: 9
- Success(es): 8
- First flight: 28 May 2000
- Last flight: 7 July 2022

First stage – M55E1
- Powered by: 1 Solid
- Maximum thrust: 935 kilonewtons (210,000 lb_{f})
- Propellant: Solid

Second stage – SR19AJ1
- Powered by: 1 Solid
- Maximum thrust: 268 kilonewtons (60,000 lb_{f})
- Propellant: Solid

Third stage (Baseline) – M57A1
- Powered by: 1 Solid
- Propellant: Solid

Third stage (Minotaur II+) – SR-73-AJ
- Powered by: 1 Solid
- Propellant: Solid

Third stage (Heavy) – Orion 50XL
- Powered by: 1 Solid
- Maximum thrust: 118.2 kilonewtons (26,600 lb_{f})
- Burn time: 74 seconds
- Propellant: Solid

Minotaur II rockets consist of the M55A1 first stage and SR19AJ1 second stage of a decommissioned Minuteman missile. The third stage varies depending on the configuration required for the payload: a Minuteman II M57A1 stage is used on the baseline configuration, whilst the Minotaur II+ uses an SR-73-AJ. The Minotaur II Lite is a two-stage configuration, without a third stage. A heavy configuration is also available, with an Orion 50XL third stage, as used on the Minotaur I. The baseline configuration can propel a 400 kilograms (880 lb) payload 4,000 kilometres (2,500 mi) downrange, whilst the heavy configuration can place 1,400 kilograms (3,100 lb) onto an 8,000-kilometre (5,000 mi) trajectory.

Nine Minotaur II rockets have been launched as of July 2022, with six flights using the baseline configuration and three using the Minotaur II+ configuration. Launches are conducted from Launch Facility 06 (LF-06) and Test Pad 01 (TP-01).

== Launch history ==
Flight No.	Date (UTC)	Rocket	Payload	Launch pad	Trajectory	Result
1	May 28, 2000 20:00	Minotaur II	OSP-TLV Missile Defense Technology Demonstrator	Vandenberg LF-06	Suborbital	Success
2	December 12, 2001	Minotaur II	IFT-7 target mission	Vandenberg LF-06	Suborbital	Success
3	March 16, 2002 02:11	Minotaur II	TLV-1 IFT-8 GMDS target mission	Vandenberg LF-06	Suborbital	Success
4	October 15, 2002 02:01	Minotaur II	TLV-3 GMDS target mission	Vandenberg LF-06	Suborbital	Success
5	December 11, 2002 08:26	Minotaur II	TLV-4 GMDS target mission	Vandenberg LF-06	Suborbital	Success
6	March 20, 2007 04:27	Minotaur II	TLV-5 FTX-02 SBR target mission	Vandenberg LF-06	Suborbital	Success
7	August 23, 2007 08:30	Minotaur II+	TLV-7 Mission 2a sensor target for NFIRE satellite	Vandenberg LF-06	Suborbital	Success
8	September 24, 2008 06:57	Minotaur II+	TLV-8 Mission 2b sensor target for NFIRE satellite	Vandenberg LF-06	Suborbital	Success
9	July 7, 2022 06:01	Minotaur II+	Mk21A reentry vehicle test (Note: Reentry vehicle demonstration for the future LGM-35A Sentinel intercontinental ballistic missile. Rocket exploded 11 seconds after launch.)	Vandenberg TP-01	Suborbital	Failure
