= HawkSat-1 =

2009 Cubesat

- Mission type: Technology demonstration
- Operator: Hawk Institute for Space Sciences
- COSPAR ID: 2009-028D
- SATCAT no.: 35004
- Mission duration: Failed on orbit

Spacecraft properties
- Spacecraft type: CubeSat
- Bus: 1U CubeSat
- Manufacturer: Hawk Institute for Space Sciences; Pumpkin Inc. (bus)
- Launch mass: 1 kg (2.2 lb)
- Dimensions: 10 × 10 × 10 cm (3.9 × 3.9 × 3.9 in)
- Power: Solar cells, batteries

Start of mission
- Launch date: 19 May 2009, 23:55 UTC
- Rocket: Minotaur I
- Launch site: MARS, LP-0B
- Contractor: Orbital Sciences Corporation
- Entered service: Failed on orbit

End of mission
- Decay date: 4 September 2011

Orbital parameters
- Reference system: Geocentric orbit
- Regime: Low Earth orbit
- Perigee altitude: 426 km (265 mi)
- Apogee altitude: 466 km (290 mi)
- Inclination: 40.46°
- Period: 93.50 minutes

HawkSat-1 was a single-unit CubeSat which was built and is being operated by the Hawk Institute for Space Sciences (HISS), Pocomoke City, Maryland. It is based on a Pumpkin Inc. CubeSat kit, and carries a technology demonstration payload, primarily as a proof of concept mission, testing command, data and power subsystems, as well as solar panels and communications.

It carries a commercial material exposure research payload for an undisclosed "major aerospace company", which exposes a number of material samples to space, and records the effects of exposure on the materials. The data was to be sent to Earth by means of a storage and dump communication system.

== Launch ==
It was successfully launched on an Orbital Sciences Corporation Minotaur I launch vehicle from Pad 0B at the Mid-Atlantic Regional Spaceport, at 23:55 UTC on 19 May 2009. It was a tertiary payload, with TacSat-3 as the primary payload and PharmaSat as the secondary. Two other CubeSats, AeroCube-3 and CP6, were launched on the same launch vehicle, and together the three satellites are known as the CubeSat Technology Demonstration mission.

== Mission ==
The satellite was successfully deployed in orbit, but no signals were received.

== Atmospheric entry ==
The satellite reentered in the atmosphere of Earth on 4 September 2011.

== See also ==
- List of CubeSats
