= CP6 =

CP6 or CP-6 may refer to:

- CP6 (classification), a disability sport classification specific to cerebral palsy
- CP6 (satellite), a satellite operated by California Polytechnic State University
- Honeywell CP-6, a discontinued computer operating system
- CP6, a Network Rail Control Period (2019–2024) of railway infrastructure in Great Britain
- CP6, an EEG electrode site in the 10-20 system

== See also ==
- .срб, a top-level domain for Serbia
