= AeroCube-3 =

1U Cubesat

- Mission type: Technology demonstration
- Operator: The Aerospace Corporation / USAF
- COSPAR ID: 2009-028E
- SATCAT no.: 35005
- Mission duration: 1-3 years (planned); 1.5 years (achieved)

Spacecraft properties
- Spacecraft type: 1U CubeSat
- Bus: CubeSat
- Launch mass: 1 kg (2.2 lb)
- Dimensions: 10 × 10 × 10 cm (3.9 × 3.9 × 3.9 in)
- Power: Solar cells, batteries

Start of mission
- Launch date: 19 May 2009, 23:55 UTC
- Rocket: Minotaur I
- Launch site: MARS, LP-0B
- Contractor: Orbital Sciences Corporation

End of mission
- Decay date: 6 January 2011

Orbital parameters
- Reference system: Geocentric orbit
- Regime: Low Earth orbit
- Perigee altitude: 427 km (265 mi)
- Apogee altitude: 466 km (290 mi)
- Inclination: 40.48°
- Period: 93.51 minutes

AeroCube-3 is a single-unit CubeSat which was built and is being operated by The Aerospace Corporation, at El Segundo, California. It is the third AeroCube picosatellite, following on from AeroCube-1, which was lost in a launch failure in 2006, and AeroCube-2 which was successfully launched in 2007 but failed immediately after launch. Compared to its predecessors it contains several improvements in its infrastructure, including a redesigned power system, replacing the older system which was responsible for the loss of AeroCube-2. Its development was funded by the United States Air Force Space and Missile Systems Center, at Los Angeles Air Force Base.

== Picosatellite ==
AeroCube-3 carried technology development experiments. The primary systems demonstrated were a two-axis solar tracker and an Earth tracker, which could be used in the guidance systems of future satellites. It also carried a 0.6 m (2 ft 0 in) balloon used for tracking tests and to increase drag, increasing the satellite's rate of orbital decay after its mission was completed. AeroCube-3 incorporates a semi-spherical (8-panel) balloon that can serve also as a tracking aid. AeroCube-3 uses an inflation system similar to the one on AeroCube-2. The difference in orbit life (with and without a balloon) is estimated to be from 1–3 years (depending on atmosphere assumptions) without a balloon compared with 2–3 months with the balloon inflated. A VGA-resolution camera pointing in the direction of the balloon will photograph its state of inflation.

== Mission ==
The AeroCube-3 mission consists of two phases. Phase A occurs with the AeroCube-3 tethered to the Orion 38 motor that is the upper stage for the TacSat-3 Minotaur launch vehicle. During this phase, AeroCube-3 will measure its dynamics while on the end of a 61 m (200 ft)-long tether attached to a tumbling object (the upper stage). A VGA-resolution camera with a wide-angle field of view will attempt to photograph the upper stage on orbit. A tether reeling mechanism inside the picosatellite can close the distance by drawing in the tether (it operates by ground command). Phase B occurs when the tether is cut and AeroCube-3 becomes a freeflying CubeSat picosatellite. In this phase, permanent magnets and hysteresis material will align the satellite with Earth's magnetic field. In this configuration, a sensor suite will sweep Earth's surface and various experiments can be performed. AeroCube-3 will store sensor data until it passes over its ground station and the data is downloaded.

== Launch ==
It was successfully launched on an Orbital Sciences Corporation Minotaur I launch vehicle from Pad 0B at the Mid-Atlantic Regional Spaceport, at 23:55 UTC on 19 May 2009. It was a tertiary payload, with TacSat-3 as the primary payload and PharmaSat as the secondary. Two other CubeSats, HawkSat-1 and CP6, were also launched, and together the three satellites were known as the CubeSat Technology Demonstration mission. The three satellites are placed in a Poly-Picosatellite Orbital Deployer (P-POD), which is about the size of a large loaf of bread.

== Deployment ==
The standard deployment system for cubesats, the P-POD was developed by the Aerospace Engineering Department at California Polytechnic State University, San Luis Obispo. After the primary satellite has been released and a collision and contamination avoidance maneuver has been performed, each cubesat will be deployed separately from the P-POD into space.

The satellite reentered in the atmosphere of Earth on 6 January 2011.

== See also ==
- List of CubeSats
