= Simulated Electronic Launch Peacekeeper =

Simulated Electronic Launch Peacekeeper (SELP) was a method used by the United States Air Force to verify the reliability of the LGM-118A Peacekeeper intercontinental ballistic missile.

SELM replaced key components at the Launch Control Center to allow a physical "keyturn" by missile combat crew members. This test allowed end-to-end verification of the ICBM launch process.

SELP was phased out with the deactivation of the Peacekeeper ICBM in 2005 following Strategic Arms Reduction Treaty II (START II).

== Logistics Support ==
The ICBM System Program Office at Hill AFB, Utah provided technical support to SELP tests The information obtained from tests provided a complete assessment of the weapon systems for Air Force Space Command (AFSPC).

== See also ==
- Simulated Electronic Launch Minuteman - similar verification test performed on LGM-30 Minuteman
