= Air Force Nuclear Weapons Center =

US Air Force unit tasked with ensuring safe, secure, and reliable nuclear weapon systems

Coordinates: 35.055°N 106.557°W

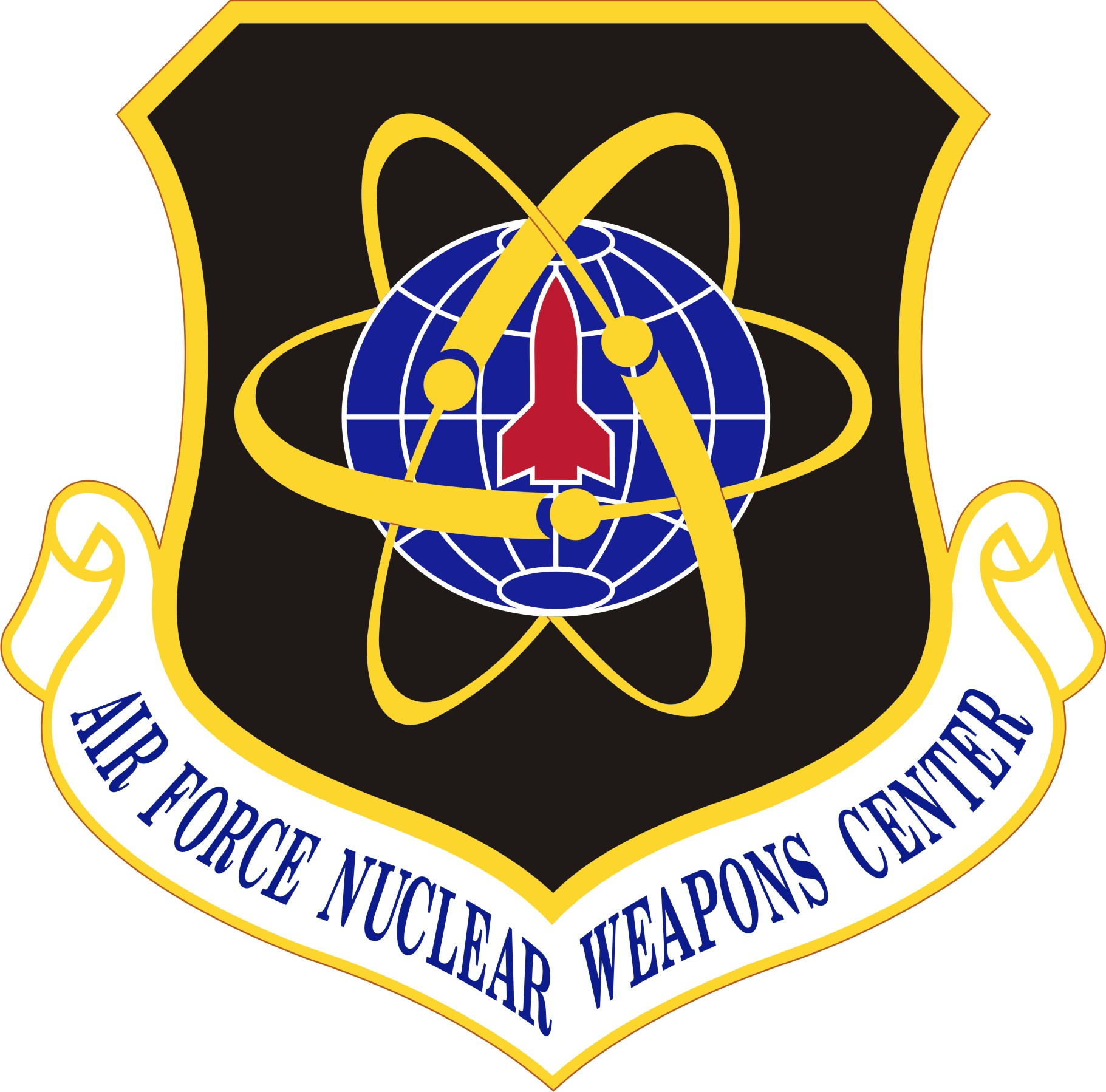
- Air Force Nuclear Weapons Center emblem (Note: Approved 9 May 2006.)
- Active: 1949–1976; 2006–present
- Country: United States
- Branch: United States Air Force
- Role: Nuclear weapons support
- Part of: Air Force Materiel Command
- Garrison/HQ: Kirtland Air Force Base
- Mottos: Never Doubted, Always Feared
- Decorations: Organizational Excellence Award

Commanders
- Current commander: Brig Gen William S. Rogers

Insignia
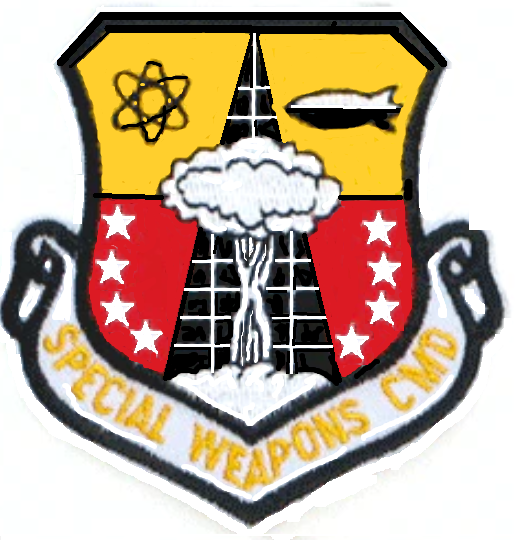
- Special Weapons Command (later Special Weapons Center) emblem

The Air Force Nuclear Weapons Center is a USAF unit assigned to the Air Force Materiel Command (AFMC) at Kirtland Air Force Base, New Mexico.

Established on 31 March 2006, the center is Air Force Materiel Command's (AFMC) center of expertise for nuclear weapon systems.

== History ==
=== Background ===
The origin of the Air Force Nuclear Weapons Center began during the post-World War II following the Manhattan Project, which was designed by the United States Army from the outset to be a temporary organization to produce a nuclear weapon. With the end of the war, the establishment of the "Z Division" at Sandia Base and later the Sandia National Laboratory led to the creation of a United States Army Air Forces organization to coordinate military activities with the civilian research organization in 1946. On 18 September 1947, President Harry S. Truman signed the National Security Act of 1947, separating the Army Air Forces from the Army by creating the independent United States Air Force. The newly formed Air Force began assuming activities with nuclear research laboratories as Cold War tensions with the Soviet Union were rising.

=== Special Weapons Command ===
Initially part of Continental Air Command and Air Materiel Command, the center was established as the Air Force Special Weapons Command as a Major Command of the United States Air Force on 1 December 1949. It was equal to the Air Defense Command, Strategic Air Command, and Tactical Air Command. It assumed all functions of the World War II Atomic Tactical and Technical Liaison Committees, its mission was to provide an organization for the development and testing of atomic weapons. The nucleus of this organization was composed of the pioneering Air Force agencies which had located there to determine future employment of nuclear weapons.

The SWC was headquartered at Kirtland AFB. The mission was to provide an organization for development testing of special weapons, including atomic, biological, and chemical weapons, and to increase the efficiency of airborne vehicles to carry these weapons. As a result, the responsibility for biological-chemical warfare research was moved from Wright-Patterson AFB to the SWC at Kirtland. The SWC assumed all the functions of the old USAF Field Office for Atomic Energy [TandTLC] and employed personnel who were transferred from that office to form the cadre of the HQ, SWC. The command was also directed to provide personnel and equipment for development and proof testing of aircraft equipment and ground handling appurtenance to special weapons. Shortly after it was established, the SWC took over the host responsibilities for Kirtland from Air Materiel Command.

SWC served as the primary source for scientific and technical information on special weapons development. To accomplish its mission, SWC redesignated numerous units that had been under the USAF Field Office of Atomic Energy with no change in station. SWC units at Kirtland in 1951 were:

- 4901st Special Weapons (later Support) Wing (Atomic)
- 4925th Special Weapons (later Test) Group (Atomic)
- 4905th Maintenance and Supply Group
- 4910th Air Base Group

It appears that the 4901st Special Weapons Wing had administrative control over the groups, with the 4905th Maintenance and Supply Group and the 4910th Air Base Group serving as support and the base host, respectively, while the 4925th Special Weapons Group was the group actively involved with atomic testing.

In January 1950, President Truman directed the Atomic Energy Commission to emphasize thermonuclear research, with the prime objective to become operational in delivering hydrogen bombs. The primary USAF group to work on this mission was the 4925th Special Weapons Group. The 4925th Special Weapons Group was a mix of elite U.S. airmen and support personnel tasked with testing all aircraft in the USAF inventory for nuclear weapons delivery capability. The top bomber and fighter pilots in the USAF and expert support personnel were transferred to the 4925th Special Weapons Group. In July 1951, the 4925th Special Weapons Group was redesignated the 4925th Test Group (Atomic) and continued for 11 years as an important component of Kirtland 's nuclear responsibilities.

SWC's responsibilities expanded in July 1951 to include monitoring the Military Weapons Effects Program, the ongoing series of full-scale nuclear tests, and exercising overall control over participating USAF personnel. The 4930th Test Support Group was "a holding cadre for USAF participating personnel of overseas nuclear testing Joint Task Forces".

The command was redesignated the Air Force Special Weapons Center (AFSWC) and assigned to Air Research and Development Command on 1 April 1952, losing major command status and became a subordinate unit of the Air Research and Development Command.

As the AFSWC, it became one of the distinct research and development centers within the command. Its mission was to ensure the atomic capability of aircraft and missiles. During the 1950s, assigned personnel and aircraft participated in atmospheric nuclear tests in Nevada and the Pacific Proving Grounds. The first Air Force scientific capabilities at the base were created during the mid-1950s. Biophysicists deliberately flew aircraft through nuclear clouds to determine radiation hazards. Engineers also launched sounding rockets so physicists could study the effects of high-altitude nuclear explosions and the nature of the recently discovered Van Allen radiation belts around the Earth.

From the early years of Cold War, the need to test and evaluate supersonic aircraft technologies, associated munitions, and eventually space systems, required the Air Force to build specialized ground test facilities. As nuclear weapons and electronics became more a part of air power, two new locations for Test and Evaluation (T&E) were created. The Special Weapons Center (SWC) at Kirtland Air Force Base, New Mexico concentrated on the technologies supporting nuclear weapons development.

Hanscom Air Force Base, Massachusetts concentrated on new levels of sophistication in electronics and avionics development. However, both locations were closed for testing in the late 1970s because the Air Force felt that limited Research and Development funds were better spent on technology than on infrastructure.

One aspect of the testing environment involves the features a particular location might offer that could help (or hinder) testing of weapons such as supersonic aircraft technologies, associated munitions, and space systems. For example, the Special Weapons Center was established at Kirtland Air Force Base, New Mexico because of the concentration of technologies and industries supporting nuclear weapons development in the region.

In 1958 Special Weapons Center scientists began to simulate the effects of nuclear explosions in order to strengthen US missiles, missile sites and aircraft against possible enemy attack. It was in 1958 that a nuclear effects simulator was first constructed in an abandoned dining hall at Kirtland.

In the wake of the signing of the Partial Nuclear Test Ban Treaty in 1963, the Air Force Weapons Laboratory (AFWL) was created from the Research Directorate elements of the Special Weapons Center. The Special Weapons Center gave up much of its research and development work to the newly created Air Force Weapons Laboratory. The Center continued with its test and evaluation mission and as Kirtland's host organization. The Weapons Laboratory built facilities during the 1960s to simulate nuclear effects such as transient radiation, X-rays, and electromagnetic pulse (EMP).

The Special Weapons Center took over management of Air Force Systems Command's test and evaluation facilities at Holloman Air Force Base near Alamogordo, New Mexico, during the summer of 1970. And, just one year later on 1 July 1971, Kirtland merged with Manzano and Sandia Base, its neighbors to the east, creating the sprawling military complex known as Kirtland Air Force Base. The center then began providing base support services and continued to do so for the next five years, while Field Command, Defense Nuclear Agency, became a major base tenant rather than the base host organization.

Because of budget restrictions and the need to save money, the Air Force Special Weapons Center was disestablished on 1 April 1976. In 1976 AFSWC was closed and OPR [Office of Primary Responsibility?] functions came to the AFWL. Special Weapons Center's responsibilities as Kirtland's "landlord" were also transferred to the Air Force Contract Management Division on the same day.

=== Air Force Nuclear Weapons Center ===
On 31 March 2006, the Air Force reactivated the unit as the Nuclear Weapons Center, combining oversight of nuclear weapons under a single organization. In 2008, the Nuclear Weapons Center was redesignated the Air Force Nuclear Weapons Center.

The Nuclear Weapons Center, Intercontinental Ballistic Missile (ICBM) Systems Directorate at Hill AFB, Utah provides technical support to Simulated Electronic Launch Minuteman (SELM) tests. The tests verify the reliability of the LGM-30 Minuteman intercontinental ballistic missile. SELM replaces key components at the Launch Control Center to allow a physical "keyturn" by missile combat crew members. This test allows end-to-end verification in the ICBM launch process.

The information obtained from tests provide a complete assessment of the weapon systems for Air Force Global Strike Command (AFGSC). Back in the 1970s, the 44th Strategic Missile Wing hosted "Giant Pace Test 74-1," the first SELM exercise. Eleven sorties underwent successful simulated launch from LCC and ALCS.

In an effort to simplify nuclear sustainment and acquisition, the Nuclear Weapons Center was reorganized again in 2015. The 377th Air Base Wing was transferred to Air Force Global Strike Command and maintenance activities in Europe to United States Air Forces in Europe - Air Forces Africa effective 1 October 2015. At that time, the AFNWC commander became dual-hatted as the Program Executive Officer for Strategic Systems aligning the sustainment activities previously handled by the center with the acquisition functions handled by the Program Executive Officer.

== Lineage ==
- Established as the Special Weapons Command (a USAF Major Command), and activated on 1 December 1949

Redesignated Air Force Special Weapons Center (lost Major Command status) on 1 April 1952
Inactivated on 1 April 1976

- Redesignated Nuclear Weapons Center on 14 February 2006

Activated on 31 March 2006
Redesignated Air Force Nuclear Weapons Center on 29 February 2008

=== Components ===
- 377th Air Base Wing, 31 March 2006 – 30 September 2015
- 498th Nuclear Systems Wing, 31 March 2006 – 27 January 2012
- 2758th Experimental Wing (later 4901st Special Weapons Wing, 4901st Support Wing (Atomic), 4900th Air Base Group,4900th Air Base Group (later Wing),, 1 December 1949 – 1 April 1976
- 4910th Air Base Group, 1 December 1949 – 1 May 1955
- 4925th Special Weapons Group (later 4925th Test Group), 1 December 1949 – 31 August 1961
- 4950th Test Group (Nuclear), 1 September 1956 – 16 August 1961

=== Assignments ===
- Headquarters United States Air Force, 1 December 1949
- Air Research and Development Command (later Air Force Systems Command), 1 April 1952 – 1 April 1976
- Air Force Materiel Command, 31 March 2006 – present

=== Stations ===
- Kirtland Air Force Base, New Mexico, 1 February 1946 – 1 April 1976; 31 March 2006 – Present

== List of commanders ==
No.	Commander		Term		
No.	Portrait	Name	Took office	Left office	Term length
1	Terrence Feehan	Colonel; Terrence Feehan	July 2006	April 2008	~1 year, 275 days
2	Everett Thomas	Brigadier General; Everett Thomas	April 2008	20 January 2011	~2 years, 294 days
3	Garrett Harencak	Brigadier General; Garrett Harencak	20 January 2011	6 February 2013	2 years, 17 days
4	Sandra Finan	Major General; Sandra Finan	6 February 2013	1 October 2015	2 years, 236 days
5	Scott Jansson	Major General; Scott Jansson	1 October 2015	5 October 2017	2 years, 4 days
6	Shaun Morris	Major General; Shaun Morris	6 October 2017	26 July 2020	2 years, 294 days
7	Anthony Genatempo	Major General; Anthony Genatempo	26 July 2020	21 June 2022	1 year, 330 days
8	John P. Newberry	Major General; John P. Newberry	21 June 2022	1 July 2025	3 years, 10 days
9	William S. Rogers	Brigadier General; William S. Rogers	8 July 2025	Incumbent	1 year, 18 days

== See also ==
- Simulated Electronic Launch Peacekeeper - similar verification test performed on LGM-118A Peacekeeper
