= 377th Air Base Wing =

US Air Force unit

377th Air Base Wing

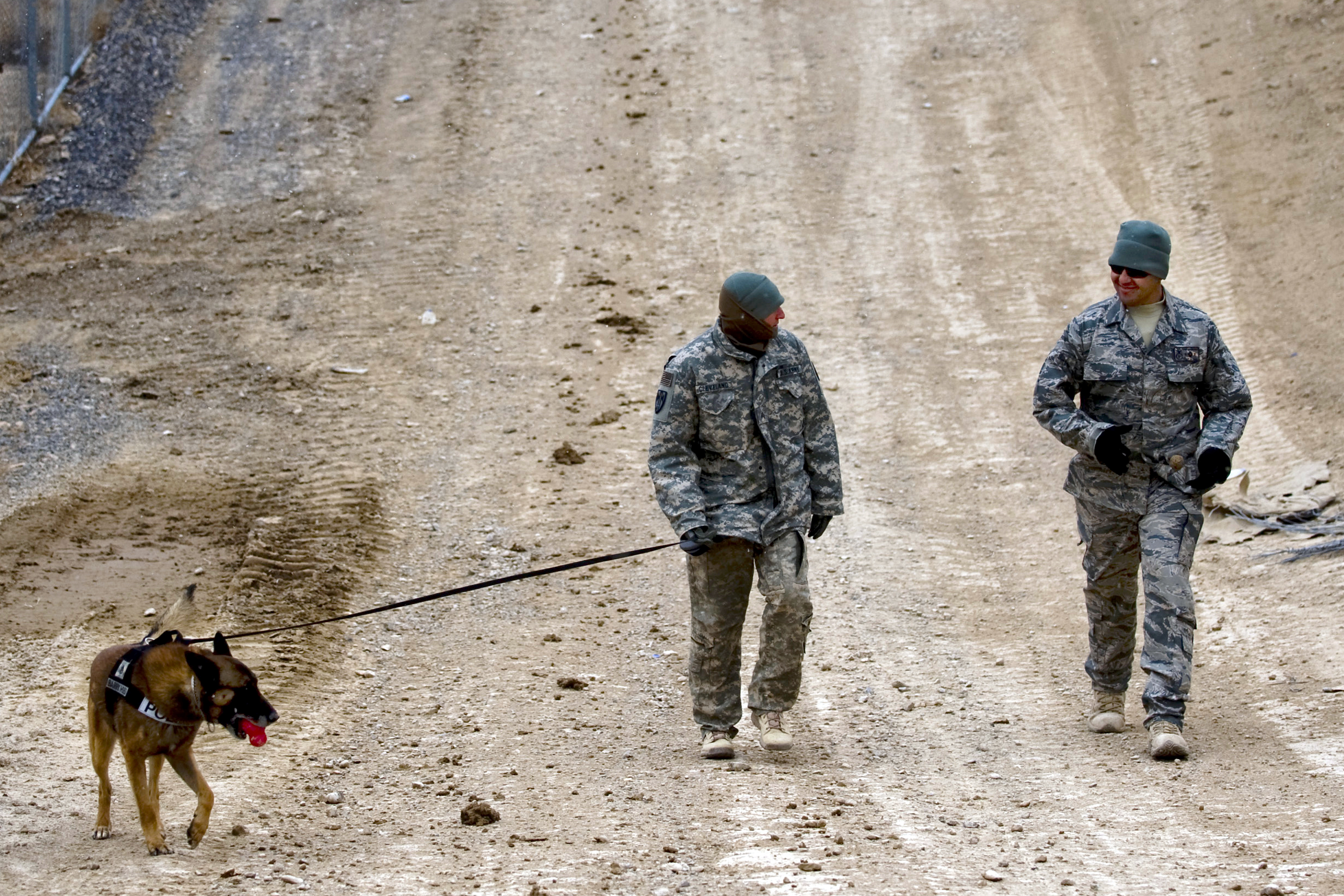
- An airman and military working dog of the 377th Air Base Wing deployed to Forward Operating Base Lagman, Afghanistan following an explosive ordnance disposal exercise
- Active: 1966–1973; 1985–1991; 1993–present
- Country: United States
- Branch: United States Air Force
- Type: Base Support
- Size: 2,500 military, civilian and contractor
- Part of: Air Force Global Strike Command
- Garrison/HQ: Kirtland Air Force Base
- Motto: Serving Freedom's Finest{ (Note: Approved 31 July 1969. Ravenstein, p. 203)
- Decorations: Air Force Outstanding Unit Award With Combat "V"; Air Force Outstanding Unit Award; Republic of Vietnam Gallantry Cross with palm
- Battle honours: Vietnam War

Commanders
- Current commander: Colonel Jason Vattioni

Insignia
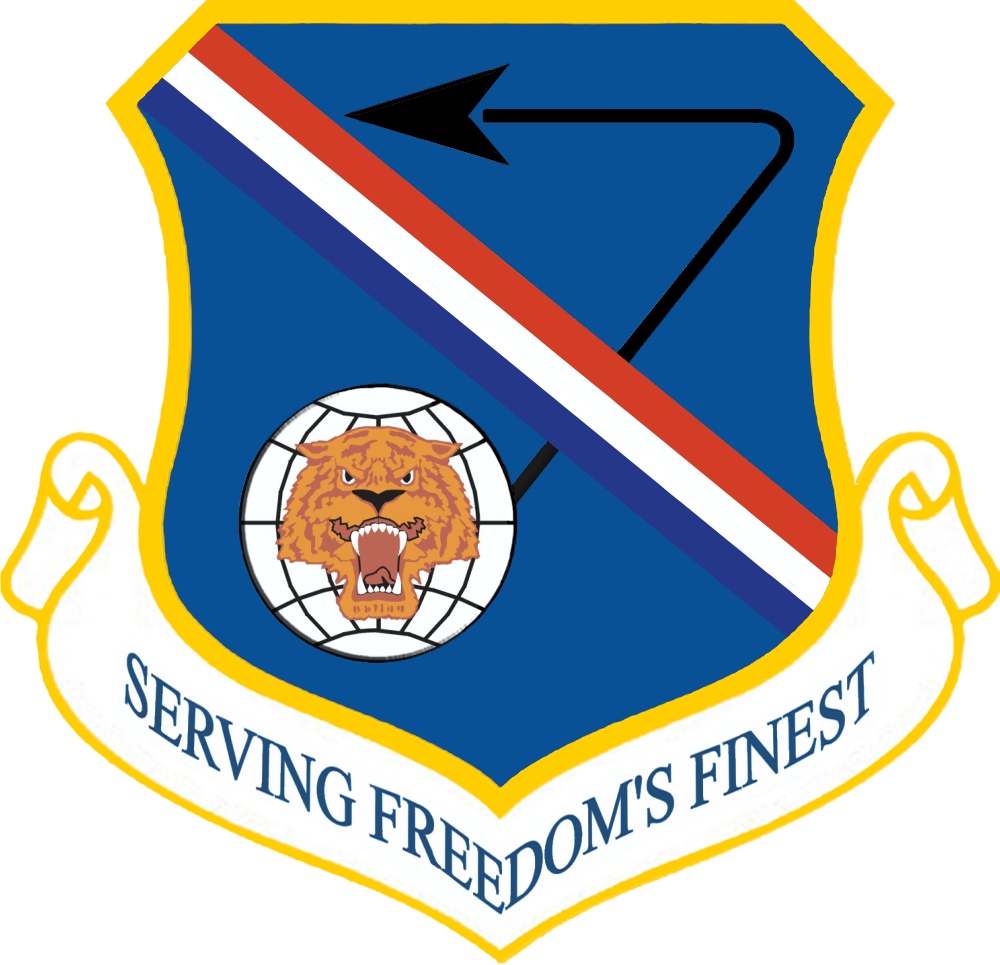
- 377th Air Base Wing emblem (Note: Approved 2 May 1995.)

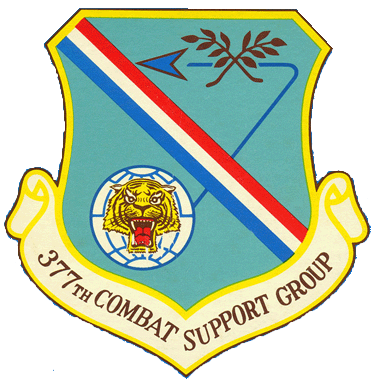
- 377th Combat Support Group emblem (Note: Approved 17 July 1967.)

The 377th Air Base Wing is a wing of the United States Air Force based at Kirtland Air Force Base, New Mexico. The wing has been the host unit at Kirtland since January 1993. It was activated on 1 January 1993, when Air Force Materiel Command assumed responsibility for operating the base from Air Mobility Command.

The wing was first organized in 1966 as the 377th Combat Support Group at Tan Son Nhut Airport, Republic of Vietnam. In 1972, it was expanded to wing level and gained a tactical flying mission. It began phasing down in early 1973 and transferred most of its remaining assets to the Vietnamese Air Force before inactivating.

The wing was activated in 1985 as the host organization at Ramstein Air Base and served in that capacity until it was inactivated in 1991 when United States Air Forces Europe implemented the Objective Wing organization, combining all functions at Ramstein under the 86th Wing.

== Units ==
The wing is made up of approximately 1,200 active-duty military, 591 federal civilians and 720 contractors assigned. Its subordinate units are:

377th Mission Support Group

- 377th Contracting Squadron
- 377th Communications Squadron
- 377th Comptroller Squadron
- 377th Civil Engineer Squadron
- 377th Logistics Readiness Squadron
- 377th Mission Support Squadron
- 377th Force Support Squadron

377th Medical Group

- 377th Aerospace Medicine Squadron
- 377th Dental Squadron
- 377th Medical Operations Squadron
- 377th Medical Support Squadron

377th Security Forces Group

- 377th Security Forces Squadron
- 377th Weapons System Security Squadron

377th Maintenance Group

- 377th Maintenance Squadron
- 898th Munitions Squadron

377th Test and Evaluation Group (Vandenberg Space Force Base, California)

- 377th Flight Test Missile Maintenance Squadron (Vandenberg Space Force Base, California)
- 377th Test Support Squadron
- 576th Flight Test Squadron (Vandenberg Space Force Base, California)

== History ==
=== Vietnam War ===
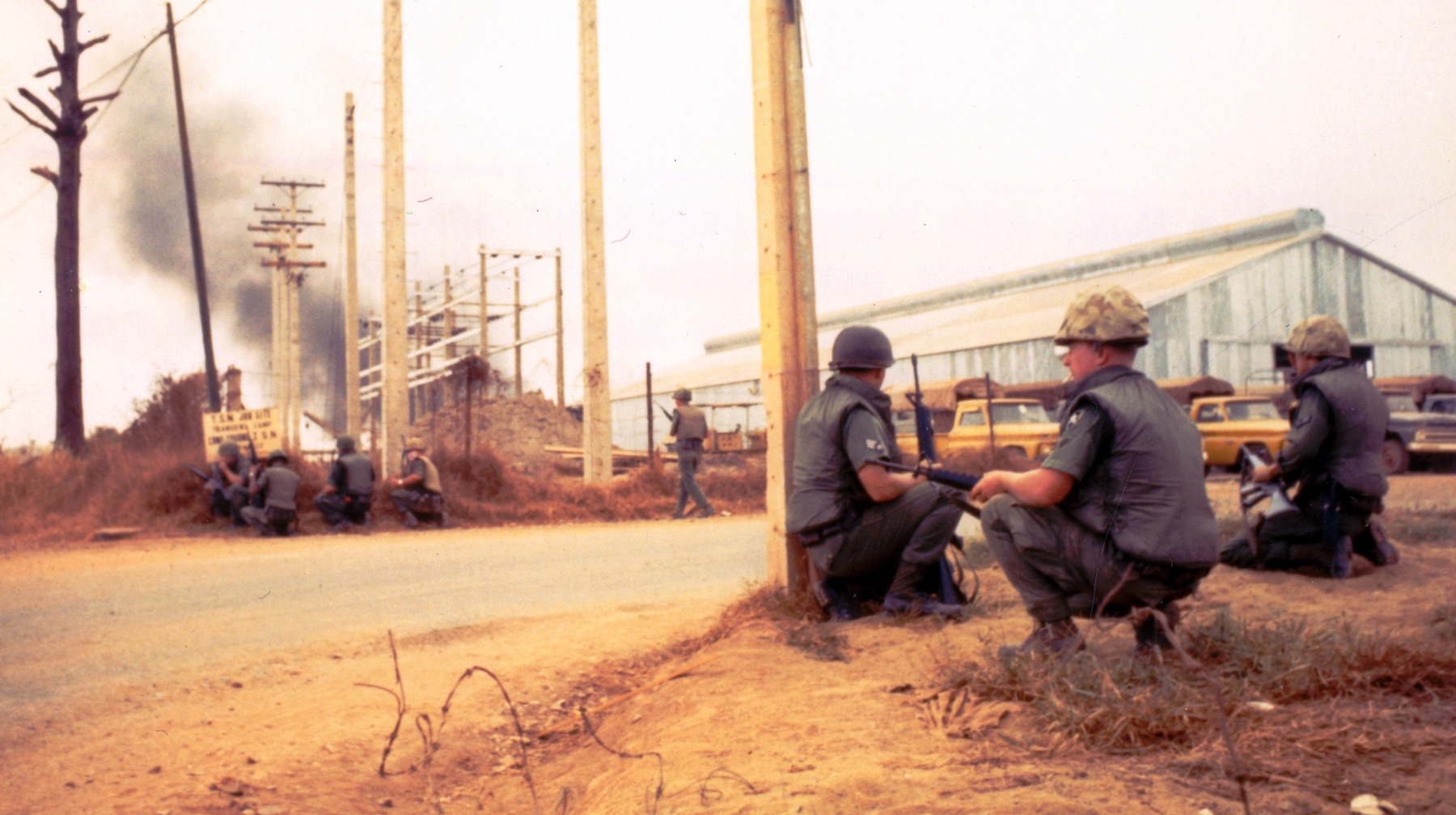
Security Policemen at Tan Son Nhut Airport during the Tet Offensive

The wing traces its history to the 377th Combat Support Group (CSG). The 377th CSG was first activated at Tan Son Nhut Airport, South Vietnam in April 1966, as US Air Forces in Vietnam expanded during the Vietnam War. The 377th CSG replaced the 6250th Combat Support Group,, which had acted as host for Tan Son Nhut since the 33d Tactical Group was inactivated the previous year. It became responsible for operation and maintenance of USAF portion of Tan Son Nhut until it was inactivated in March 1973.

In Vietnam, the group's responsibilities included housing numerous tenant organizations including Seventh Air Force, base defense, and liaison with the Republic of Vietnam Air Force. Many enemy attacks were made on Tan Son Nhut Airport and the group. It was also responsible for Binh Thuy Air Base, South Vietnam between 12 May and 1 July 1970. The group provided support for Seventh Air Force flying operations with from June to December 1966, and again after September 1971. From this date it also supported Lockheed C-130 Hercules aircraft deployed to the control of the 834th Air Division.

In January 1972, the 377th expanded to become the 377th Air Base Wing and for the first time gained combat units, when the 8th and 9th Special Operations Squadrons and the 310th Tactical Airlift Squadron were assigned or attached to it. These units had all been assigned to the 315th Tactical Airlift Wing, which was preparing for inactivation. The wing operated the Southeast Asia Central Instructor Pilots School, in which the 360th Tactical Electronic Warfare Squadron used C/EC-47s, from 15 February until about November 1972. The wing also operated a combat crew training school for de Havilland Canada C-7 Caribou at Phù Cát Air Base, South Vietnam, from the time the 315th Wing was inactivated on 15 March until October 1972. It resumed base flight operations at Tan Son Nhut in January 1972, operating and maintaining C-47, C-118, and T-39 aircraft. With the 8th Special Operations Squadron (A-37s), the 377th performed strike missions from January through October 1972; the 9th Special Operations Squadron (O-2s and C-47s) conducted psychological warfare operations, January until –February 1972; the 21st Tactical Air Support Squadron (Light) conducted air liaison and forward air control operations from March 1972 until 28 January 1973; the 310th Tactical Airlift Squadron (C/UC-123s, January–June 1972 and C-7s, March–October 1972) performed airlift and airdrop missions until October 1972; the 360th Tactical Electronic Warfare Squadron (C/EC-47s) conducted airborne radio-direction finding operations, February–November 1972, and psychological warfare operations, February–August 1972. The wing established an operating location of the wing headquarters at Bien Hoa Air Base, South Vietnam, on 14 April 1972 to provide turn-around service for McDonnell F-4 Phantom IIs of other organizations. It was replaced on 20 June 1972 by Detachment 1 of the wing headquarters, which continued the F-4 turn-around service and added LTV A-7 Corsair II turn-around service on 30 October 1972. The detachment continued operations through 11 February 1973.

As the wing phased down for inactivation from February 1973, it transferred many assets to Republic of Vietnam Air Force.

=== Ramstein Air Base ===
In June 1985 the wing was redesignated the 377th Combat Support Wing and reactivated at Ramstein Air Base, Germany, where it replaced the 86th Combat Support Group. It provided support services for Ramstein and other locations in the Kaiserslautern military community and elsewhere in Germany until May 1991, when United States Air Forces Europe implemented the Objective Wing organization and its functions were transferred to elements of the 86th Wing.

=== Kirtland Air Force Base ===
The wing once again became the 377th Air Base Wing and was activated as the host wing at Kirtland Air Force Base on 1 January 1993, when Kirtland transferred from Air Mobility Command to Air Force Materiel Command. The 377th Air Base Wing has since provided support to base operations to more than 100 associate units in more than 2000 buildings. To support this mission, the 377th Air Base Wing has the largest security forces squadron in the command. Additionally, members of the 377th are continually deployed to numerous locations, where they previously helped fight the Iraq War, the War in Afghanistan, and other requirements worldwide.

In November 2009 the wing, commanded by Colonel Michael S. Duvall, failed its nuclear surety inspection. Duvall was kept on as commander to fix the problem and the wing subsequently passed its re-inspection less than 90 days later.

In December 2011 the 377th Maintenance Group was activated to take over nuclear munitions missions from two groups of the inactivating 498th Nuclear Systems Wing.

On 1 October 2015 the wing was reassigned to Twentieth Air Force of Air Force Global Strike Command from Air Force Materiel Command.

=== Mission today ===
The 377th Air Base Wing carries out nuclear, readiness, and support operations. It operates the airfield for Air Force operations, prepares personnel to deploy worldwide and keeps the base secure. it supports the Air Force Nuclear Weapons Center, the 58th Special Operations Wing, the 150th Special Operations Wing of the New Mexico Air National Guard and the U.S. Air Force Pararescue School.

As Kirtland's host organization, the 377th Air Base Wing supports base operations. It ensures the people living and working on Kirtland have the necessary support to conduct their jobs and carry out missions. This includes facility maintenance, personnel support, security, utilities and medical care. The wing also supports more than 14,000 military retirees who live in central and northern New Mexico.

In November 2022, the wing added the 377th Test and Evaluation Group, stationed at Vandenberg Space Force Base, California. The new group will enable a systems and component approach to accomplish test launches, nuclear command and control software tests, and simulated electronic launch tests for operational ICBM units.

== Lineage ==
- Established as the 377th Combat Support Group, activated and organized on 8 April 1966

Redesignated 377th Air Base Wing on 17 January 1972
Inactivated on 28 March 1973

- Redesignated 377th Combat Support Wing on 1 June 1985

Activated on 14 June 1985
Inactivated on 1 May 1991

- Redesignated 377th Air Base Wing and activated on 1 January 1993

=== Assignments ===
- Seventh Air Force: 8 April 1966 – 28 March 1973
- 316th Air Division: 14 June 1985 – 1 May 1991
- Space and Missile Systems Center: 1 January 1993
- Air Armament Center: 1 October 1998
- Air Force Materiel Command, 3 May 2004
- Nuclear Weapons Center (later Air Force Nuclear Weapons Center), 31 March 2006
- Twentieth Air Force, 1 October 2015 – present

=== Components ===
Groups

- 377th Civil Engineering Group (later 377th Civil Engineer Group): 14 June 1985 – 1 May 1991, 1 October 1995 – 1 October 2000
- 377th Logistics Group (later 377th Maintenance Group): 1 January 1993 – 31 March 2006, 1 December 2011 – present
- 377th Medical Group (see 377th USAF Dispensary)
- 377th Security Police Group (later 377th Security Forces Group): 14 June 1985 – 1 May 1991, 15 August 2011 – present
- 377th Support Group (later 377th Mission Support Group): 1 January 1993 – present
- 377th Test and Evaluation Group, 2 November 2022 – present

Operational Squadrons

- 8th Special Operations Squadron: assigned 15 January – 1 October 1972; attached 12 – 25 October 1972
- 9th Special Operations Squadron: attached 12 January 1972 – 29 February 1972.
- Air Education and Training Command Studies and Analysis Squadron: 15 March 1972 – 23 February 1973 (not operational after 21 February 1973)
- 310th Tactical Airlift Squadron: 15 January – 15 November 1972 (not operational after 1 November 1972)
- [60th Tactical Electronic Warfare Squadron: 1 February, – 24 November 1972 (not operational after 15 November 1972)
- 6252d Operations Squadron: 10 June 1966 – 1 January 1967

Support Squadrons

- 377th Air Police Squadron (later 377th Security Police Squadron): 8 April 1966 – 28 March 1973
- 377th Armament and Electronics Maintenance Squadron: 8 April 1966 – 25 November 1966
- 377th Civil Engineering Squadron: 8 April 1966 – 2 August 1972
- 377th Field Maintenance Squadron (later 377th Consolidated Aircraft Maintenance Squadron, 377th Field Maintenance Squadron): 8 April 1966 – 25 November 1966, 31 August 1971 – 28 May 1973
- Field Maintenance Squadron, Provisional, 377th: attached 28 August 1972 – 1 October 1972
- 377th Munitions Maintenance Squadron: 8 April 1966 – 30 November 1966
- 377th Organizational Maintenance Squadron: 8 April 1966 – 18 September 1966, 1 October 1972 – 38 May 1973
- Organizational Maintenance Squadron, Provisional, 377th: attached 28 August 1972 – 1 October 1972
- 377th Services Squadron: 8 April 1966 – 2 August 1972
- 377th Supply Squadron: 8 April 1966 – 28 March 1973
- 377th Transportation Squadron: 8 April 1966 – 28 March 1973
- 7000 Munitions Support Squadron: 14 June 1985 – 1988

Other

- 377th USAF Dispensary (later 377th USAF Hospital, 377th Medical Group): 8 April 1966 – 28 March 1973, 1 January 1993 – present
- Detachment 1, 377th Air Base Wing: 20 June 1972 – 11 February 1973
- Operating Location A, 377th Air Base Wing: 14–20 June 1972

=== Stations ===
- Tan Son Nhut Air Base, South Vietnam: 8 April 1966 – 28 March 1973
- Ramstein Air Base, Federal Republic of Germany: 14 June 1985 – 1 May 1991
- Kirtland Air Force Base, New Mexico: since 1 January 1993

=== Aircraft ===
- de Havilland Canada C-7 Caribou (1972)
- Douglas VC-47 Skytrain (1966, 1972–1973)
- Douglas EC-47 Skytrain (1972)
- Douglas VC-54 Skymaster (1966)
- Douglas C-118 (1972–1973)
- Douglas VC-118 (1972–1973)
- Fairchild C-123 Provider (1972)
- Fairchild VC-123 Provider (1966)
- North American T-39 Sabreliner (1972–1973)
- Cessna A-37 Dragonfly (1972)
- Cessna O-2 Skymaster (1972–1973)
