= 4925th Test Group =

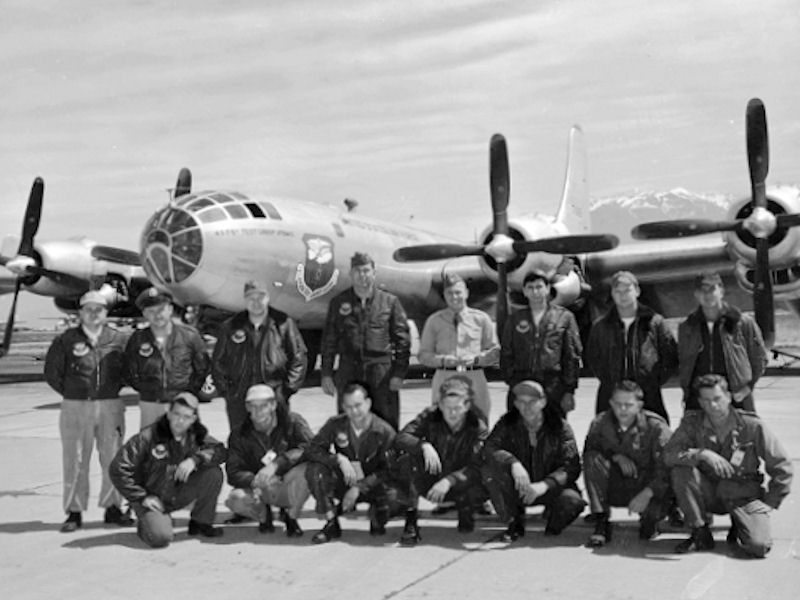
- Crew of the 4926th Test Squadron in front of their B-50D (Note: Aircraft is Boeing B-50D Superfortress, serial 47-165. The B-50 was used to collect atmospheric samples of radiation after atomic tests.)
- Active: 1949-1961
- Country: United States
- Branch: United States Air Force
- Type: Atmospheric nuclear testing
- Nickname: The Megaton Blasters

Insignia
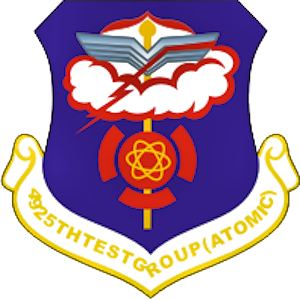
- 4925th Test Group (Atomic) emblem

The 4925th Test Group is a discontinued United States Air Force unit. It was last assigned to the 4901st Support Wing (Atomic), at Kirtland Air Force Base, New Mexico, where it was discontinued on 31 August 1961. Known as "The Megaton Blasters", the 4925th was responsible for the development flight testing of all USAF nuclear weapon delivery systems including conducting live test drops from 1951 though 1956. Following 1956 the group focused on operational methods and equipment for delivering nuclear weapons. It was discontinued when Air Force Systems Command replaced Air Research and Development Command and components of its mission were distributed among other units.

== History ==
The group was established in 1948 as the 3170th Special Weapons following a decision to consolidate all USAF special weapons activities under Air Force Special Weapons Command (AFSWC). It was tasked with testing all aircraft in the United States inventory for nuclear weapons delivery capability.

In January 1950 President Truman directed the Atomic Energy Commission (AEC) to emphasize the DOD becoming operational in delivering hydrogen bombs. To make this possible, DOD had to both adapt aircraft and the bombs to each other (referred to as “marriage”), and to develop bombing techniques that were both effective and allowed the aircraft and crew to return from attacks safely. The 4925th Special Weapons Group's mission was to marry nuclear weapons to all suitable types of aircraft, establish the ballistics of each type of nuclear weapon on precision bomb ranges, support the AEC with live test drops at Nevada and in the Pacific, and fly through and sample radioactive nuclear clouds after explosions at test drops. The group also recommended military characteristics and requirements for special weapons, provided facilities for training programs, and maintained an instrumentation laboratory and a technical liaison with the Armed Forces Special Weapons Project, AEC, and others. The group included bomber, fighter, and helicopter pilots; bombardiers; nuclear project engineers; depot level modification personnel; aerial cameramen; and crew chiefs and crews. Each had to have AEC “Q” clearance, a background check by the Federal Bureau of Investigation that went back 15 years. The group was established within a double-barbed-wire-fence complex dubbed “Area Charlie”.

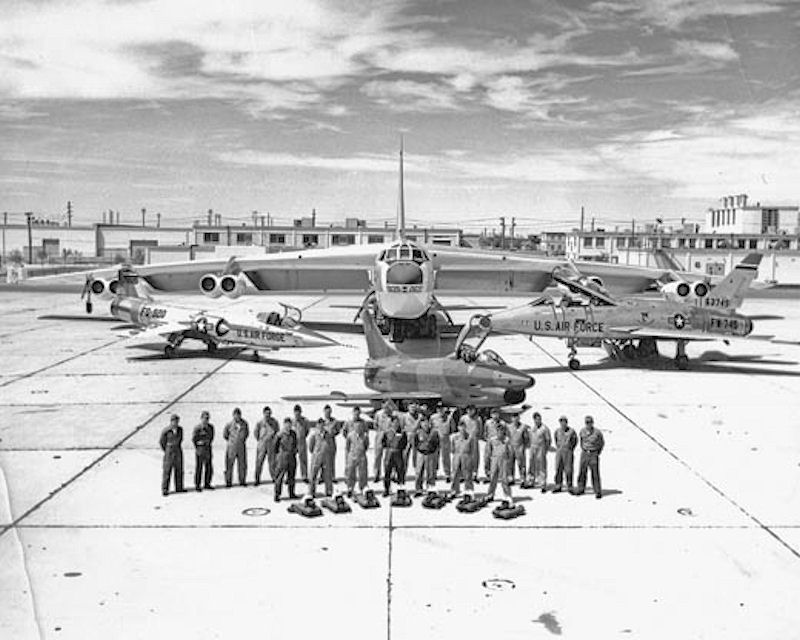
4925th Test Group (Nuclear) at Kirtland Air Force Base (Note: In addition to two B-47s (not pictured), the group’s fleet included two Boeing B-52s (one is pictured in the rear) and three fighters — from left, a Lockheed F-104 Starfighter, a Fiat G.91, and a North American F-100 Super Sabre.)

Until 1956, the group participated in the majority of atmospheric nuclear tests, both in the Pacific and in the Nevada Test Complex. The group completed live drops at both complexes. It also conducted ballistic drops with simulated bombs at the Edwards Air Force Base Precision Bombing Range, the AEC Salton Sea Precision Bomb Range, and the Low Altitude Bombing System (LABS) Bombing Range near Edwards. The group also participated in drops at the Naval Air Weapons Station China Lake Bombing Range, California, Tonopah Test Range, Nevada, White Sands Missile Range, New Mexico, and at Kirtland Air Force Base’s Bombing Range at Isleta Pueblo, New Mexico.

The group participated in AFSWC Development Directorate instigated projects such as adding a parachute to a bomb to delay delivery, which allowed for the aircrew to release the bomb and escape before it exploded. The goal of an early project was to determine the feasibility of delivering a parachute-retarded thermonuclear weapon weighing more than 40,000 pounds, the heaviest nuclear weapons in the stockpile, from altitudes exceeding 40,000 feet. One early effort was the development of a system that could retard the fall of either a TX-14 or a TX-16 weapon, both heavy airburst bombs, from altitudes of 40,000 feet to 4,000 feet from a Convair B-36 Peacemaker.

In September 1953, the group was reorganized into squadrons.

The 4926th Test Squadron (Sampling) operated various balloon platforms for nuclear cloud sampling missions during atmospheric testing. Analysis of samples collected from atomic clouds was considered the most accurate method of determining the efficiency and yield of a nuclear device.
The 4927th Test Support Squadron operated Republic F-84F Thunderjet, North American F-86E Sabre and McDonnell F-101 Voodoo aircraft in tactical aircraft nuclear weapon delivery tests;
The 4928th Test Support Squadron operated Boeing B-29 Superfortress, Boeing B-50 Superfortress, Convair B-36H Peacemaker, North American B-45 Tornado, Boeing B-47 Stratojet, Martin B-57 Canberra, Douglas B-66B Destroyer and Boeing B-52C Stratofortress in strategic bomber nuclear weapon delivery tests and provided B-36 and B-52 drop airplanes for air-launched nuclear tests in Nevada and the Pacific;
The 4929th Test Support Squadron, which provided photographic documentation support.

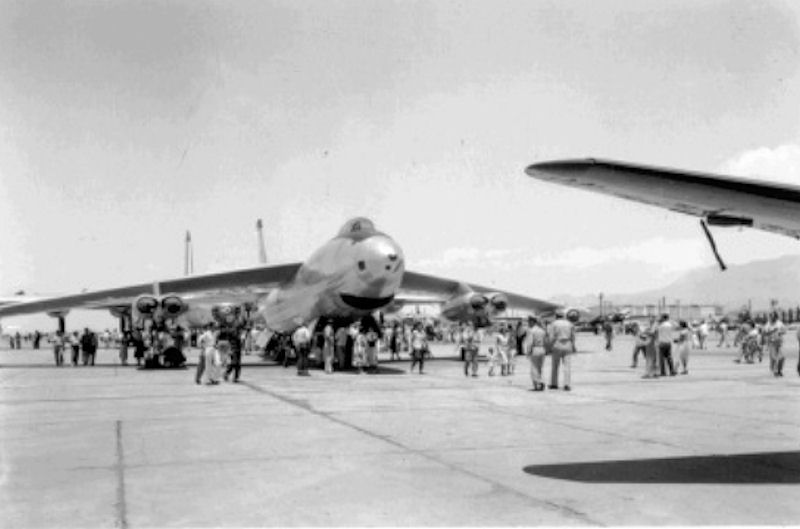
The group tested the B-47 in carrying nuclear weapons (Note: Aircraft is the group's Boeing B-47B Stratojet, serial 51-2047, shown at a 1955 open house.)

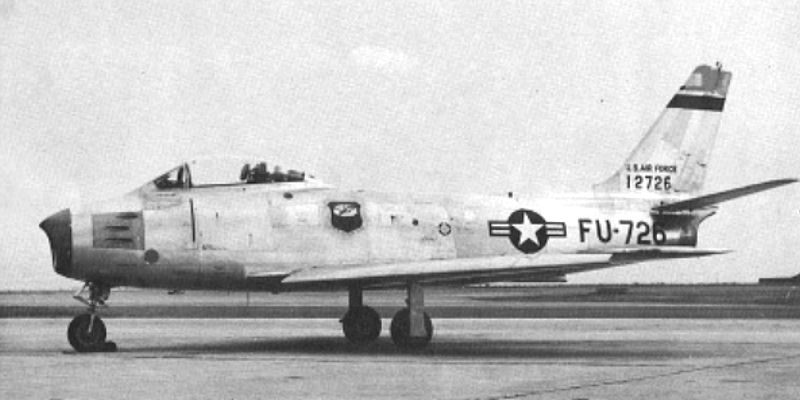
F-86E used as a chase plane for B-36 operations (Note: Aircraft is North American F-86E Sabre, serial 51-2726. The F-86 was deemed too slow for tactical nuclear weapons delivery.)

Prior to 1956, individual task groups had been organized for each set of nuclear tests. However, these proved inadequate, gathering equipment at the last minute, then seeing the equipment and records scattered or lost when they were disbanded. USAF decided to establish a permanent USAF air task group for atmospheric tests. It organized the 4950th Test Group (Nuclear) for this mission and the 4926th Test Squadron and its sampling mission were transferred to the new group. The atmospheric test participation of the 4925th Group was cut back and the group focused on the aircraft/weapon marriage mission. The group evaluated equipment for the installation of special weapons into aircraft. This included sway braces, bomb suspension and control systems, pylons and racks, handling and loading equipment, and control and monitor apparatus.

The group continued its work on marrying weapons to aircraft. It worked on equipment testing to provide single Mark 15 and Mark 21 nuclear bomb capabilities for the Boeing B-52 Stratofortress. The group also began testing the TX-28 with the swept-wing Republic F-84F Thunderstreak. Aircraft modifications included pylon and weapon loading and compatibility and electrical checks of the special weapons control systems. Flights determined aerodynamic loads, vibration, stability and control affects in straight and level, dive and Low Altitude Bombing System (LABS) maneuvers at various airspeeds, altitudes, and release and dive angles.

In 1957, AFSWC, including the group, assisted Air Defense Command (ADC) with the loading of the first operational Douglas MB-1 Genie rocket onto a Northrop F-89J Scorpion aircraft. The Northrop F-89J Scorpion was used for the live test fire of the Genie at the Nevada Test Site and became ADC's first fighter interceptor to carry nuclear armament. Other aircraft tested by the group included the B-29 and B-50D Superfortress, the B-36H Peacemaker, B-45 Tornado, B-47 Stratojet, B-57 Canberra, and B-66 Destroyer bombers. These were paired with fission and thermonuclear bombs, both established and those in development.

In 1960, the 4950th Test Group was inactivated and the 4926th Test Squadron returned to the 4925th Test Group. The group was inactivated in 1961 following the 1958 moratorium agreed to by the United States and the Soviet Union on atmospheric nuclear testing. Its 4926th Test Squadron was replaced by the 1211th Test Squadron of Military Air Transport Service. However, in 1962, the Soviet Union resumed atmospheric testing, until the Limited Test Ban Treaty was signed in 1963.

=== Lineage ===
- Designated as 3170th Special Weapons and organized on 28 August 1948
- Redesignated 3170th Special Weapons Group c. 1 June 1949

Redesignated 4925th Special Weapons Group c. 1 December 1949
Redesignated 4925th Test Group (Atomic) on 1 July 1951
Discontinued on 1 April 1961

=== Assignments ===
- Air Materiel Command, 28 August 1948
- Special Weapons Command, 1 December 1949
- 4901st Support Wing (Atomic), 1 July 1951 – 1 April 1961

=== Components ===
- 4926th Test Squadron (Sampling), 19 September 1953 – 1956, 1960–1961
- 4927th Test Support Squadron (later 4927th Support Squadron, 4927th Test Squadron), 1 September 1953 – 22 September 1958
- 4928th Support Squadron (later 4928th Support Squadron, 4928th Test Squadron), 1 September 1953 – 22 September 1958
- 4929th Support Squadron (later 4929th Support Squadron, 4929th Test Squadron), 1 September 1953 – 22 September 1958

=== Stations ===
- Kirtland Air Force Base, New Mexico, 28 August 1948 – 1 April 1961

=== Aircraft ===
- Boeing B-29 Superfortress
- Convair B-36H Peacemaker
- Boeing B-50D Superfortres
- North American B-45A Tornado
- Boeing B-47D Stratojet
- Boeing B-52C Stratofortress
- Martin B-57A Canberra
- Douglas B-66B Destroyer
- Republic F-84F Thunderjet
- North American F-86E Sabre
- McDonnell F-101A Voodoo
