= M55E1 =

M55E1 is the designation of a United States solid fuel rocket that is used as the first stage of several expendable launch systems.

== Uses ==
The M55E1 is used in the following systems:

- Minuteman III
- Minotaur

Earlier versions of the Minuteman used the M55A1 for the first stage. The US Army Homing Overlay Experiment also used the M551E1 as the first stage.

== Key Facts ==
- Manufacturer: Thiokol
- First Launch: March 14, 1970
- Liftoff Thrust: 935,000 kN (210,196 lbf)
- Total Weight: 30,000 kg (66,000 lb)
- Diameter: 1.68 m (5.51 ft)
- Length: 16.0 m (52.00 ft)
