= CP6 (satellite) =

- Names: CP6 CubeSat; CalPoly CP-6; PolySat-6; PolySat CP6
- Mission type: Technology demonstration
- Operator: California Polytechnic State University, San Luis Obispo
- COSPAR ID: 2009-028C
- SATCAT no.: 35003

Spacecraft properties
- Spacecraft type: CubeSat
- Bus: 1U CubeSat
- Manufacturer: California Polytechnic State University, San Luis Obispo (CalPoly)
- Launch mass: 1 kg (2.2 lb)
- Dimensions: 10 × 10 × 10 cm (3.9 × 3.9 × 3.9 in)
- Power: Solar cells, batteries

Start of mission
- Launch date: 19 May 2009, 23:55 UTC
- Rocket: Minotaur I
- Launch site: MARS LP-0B
- Contractor: Orbital Sciences Corporation

End of mission
- Decay date: 6 October 2011

Orbital parameters
- Reference system: Geocentric orbit
- Regime: Low Earth orbit
- Perigee altitude: 426 km (265 mi)
- Apogee altitude: 466 km (290 mi)
- Inclination: 40.46°
- Period: 93.50 minutes

CP6, also known as CP6 CubeSat, CalPoly CP-6, PolySat-6 or PolySat CP6 is a single-unit CubeSat which was built and operated by the California Polytechnic State University (CalPoly). It was primarily intended to perform a technology demonstration mission. The main experiment consisted of sensors to determine the spacecraft's attitude. Cameras on the satellite will be used to verify the data returned by the attitude sensors.

== Satellite ==
Originally built as a backup to CP3 CubeSat, while CP3 is considered an operational satellite by the PolySat team, unreliable radio issues have prevented full operation of the spacecraft's mission-required sensors. which was launched on 17 April 2007, CP6 was modified after it was decided that it would no longer be needed for that role.

In addition to the attitude determination experiment, CP6 also planned to test a system to collect electrons from the ambient plasma environment for the United States Naval Research Laboratory (NRL) as part of research into electrodynamic propulsion. The electron collector will be deployed once the primary mission, the attitude determination experiment, has been completed. This technology will have potential application in electrodynamic propulsion systems.

== Mission ==
Electrodynamic propulsion offers the prospects of enabling spacecraft to maneuver without the expenditure of conventional fuel, that is the possibility of propellant-less maneuvers. This experiment consists of three deployable devices, an electron emitter consisting of two thoriated tungsten filaments which reside at the end of a 1.8 m (5 ft 11 in) rolled up steal tape and two electron collectors that are rolled up steel tapes, each 1.1 m (3 ft 7 in) long. The tapes and electronics of the experiment are housed in a 25 mm (0.98 in) high space on one side of a deployable door nestled around two cameras of the Cal Poly primary mission. The deployable door and rolled up tapes will be deployed at the conclusion of the Cal Poly primary mission and last for 3–6 months. The mission data will be downlinked to ground stations at the Naval Research Laboratory and Cal Poly.

== Launch ==
It was successfully launched on an Orbital Sciences Corporation Minotaur I launch vehicle from Pad 0B at the Mid-Atlantic Regional Spaceport, at 23:55 UTC on 19 May 2009. It will be a tertiary payload, with TacSat-3 as the primary payload and PharmaSat as the secondary. Two other CubeSats, AeroCube-3 and HawkSat-1, were also launched on the same launch vehicle, and together the three satellites were known as the CubeSat Technology Demonstration mission.

The satellite reentered in the atmosphere of Earth on 6 October 2011.

== See also ==
- List of CubeSats
