= Sandra Finan =

United States Air Force general

Sandra E. Finan
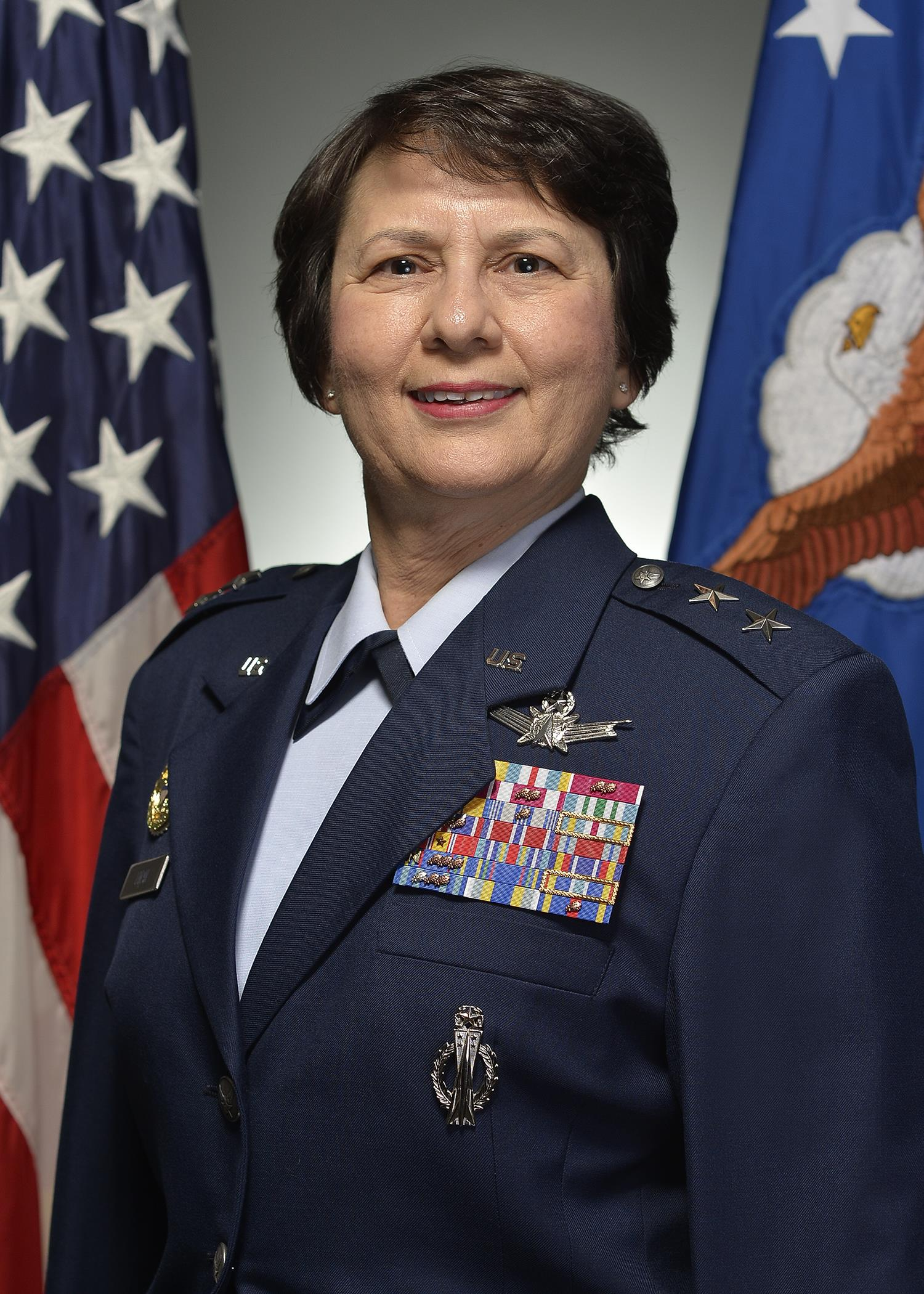
- Maj Gen Sandra E. Finan
- Military career
- Allegiance: United States of America
- Branch: United States Air Force
- Service years: 1982—1985 (ANG); 1985—2017 (USAF)
- Rank: Retired Major general
- Awards: Air Force Distinguished Service Medal; Defense Superior Service Medal; Legion of Merit (3)

Sandra E. Finan was the Deputy Chief Information Officer for Command, Control, Communications and Computers (C4) and Information Infrastructure Capabilities, Office of the Secretary of Defense, Pentagon, Washington D.C.

== Career ==
Maj Gen Finan entered the Air National Guard in 1982 as an enlisted cryptographic equipment repairperson. She received her Air Force commission in 1985 as a distinguished graduate through Officer Training School. During her career, Maj Gen Finan has served in a variety of space and missile assignments in missile crew operations; training and evaluations; satellite command and control; and satellite operations. The General has held senior staff assignments as the Air Force Global Strike Command Inspector General, the Air Force Space Command Director of Nuclear Operations, The Department of Energy, National Nuclear Security Administration Principal Deputy Administrator for Military Application, and the Office of the Secretary of Defense Deputy Chief Information Officer for Command, Control, Communications, and Computer and Information Infrastructure Capabilities.

Her commands include a space operation squadron and missile wing, as well as the Air force Nuclear Weapons Center. Maj Gen Finan has deployed to the Combined Air Operations Center in Southwest Asia as the Director of Space Forces in support of operations Iraqi Freedom and Enduring Freedom.

Maj Gen Finan retired in 2017 out of her last assignment in Washington DC with the Pentagon.

== Education ==
1978 Bachelor of Arts degree in music education, California State University, San Bernardino, California
1989 Squadron Officer School, Maxwell Air Force Base, Alabama
1989 Master of Science degree in systems management, University of Southern California, Los Angeles, California
1997 Master of Arts degree in national defense and strategic studies, Naval Command and Staff College, Newport, Rhode Island
1997 Armed Forces Staff College, Norfolk, Virginia
2004 Master of Strategic Studies degree, Air War College, Maxwell Air Force Base, Alabama
2006 National Security Fellow, Syracuse University, Syracuse, New York

== Assignments ==
1. November 1982 – January 1985, Air National Guard cryptographic technician and Air Force Reserve military training instructor, Lackland AFB, Texas
2. April 1985 – May 1987, protocol officer and executive officer, 2nd Bombardment Wing, Barksdale AFB, La.
3. June 1987 – August 1987, student, undergraduate missile training, Vandenberg AFB, Calif.
4. September 1987 – August 1991, senior evaluator commander and missile combat crew member, 341st Missile Wing, Malmstrom AFB, Mont.
5. September 1991 – September 1993, command operations evaluator, 3901st Missile Evaluation Squadron, Vandenberg AFB, Calif.
6. October 1993 – June 1996, program manager; Chief, Standardization and Evaluation; and Chief, Training Programs, 20th Air Force, F.E. Warren AFB, Wyo.
7. July 1996 – June 1997, student, Naval Command and Staff College, Newport, R.I.
8. July 1997 – September 1997, student, Joint Professional Military Education Phase II, Armed Forces Staff College, Norfolk, Va.
9. October 1997 – August 1999, special assistant to the Commander; executive assistant to the Deputy Commander; and National Military Command System command and control officer, U.S. Strategic Command, Offutt AFB, Neb.
10. September 1999 – August 2000, executive assistant to the Director of Security and Emergency Operations, Department of Energy, Washington, D.C.
11. September 2000 – June 2001, operations officer, 21st Space Operation Squadron, Onizuka Air Force Station, Calif.
12. July 2001 – June 2003, Commander, 21st Space Operations Squadron, and Installation Commander, Onizuka AFS, Calif.
13. July 2003 – May 2004, student, Air War College, Maxwell AFB, Ala.
14. June 2004 – July 2006, Vice Commander, 91st Missile Wing, Minot AFB, N.D.
15. July 2006 – May 2008, Commander, 341st Missile Wing, Malmstrom AFB, Mont.
16. June 2008 – August 2009, Director, Nuclear Operations, Headquarters Air Force Space Command, Peterson AFB, Colo.
17. September 2009 – December 2010, Inspector General, Headquarters Air Force Global Strike Command, Barksdale AFB, La.
18. January 2011 – January 2013, Principal Assistant Deputy Administrator for Military Application, Office of Defense Programs, National Nuclear Security Administration, Department of Energy, Washington, D.C.
19. February 2013 – October 2015, Commander, Air Force Nuclear Weapons Center, Kirtland AFB, N.M.
20. October 2015 – present, Deputy Chief Information Officer for Command, Control, Communications and Computers (C4) and Information Infrastructure Capabilities, Office of the Secretary of Defense, Pentagon, Washington D.C.

== Awards and decorations ==
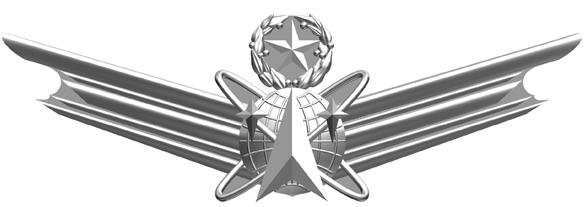
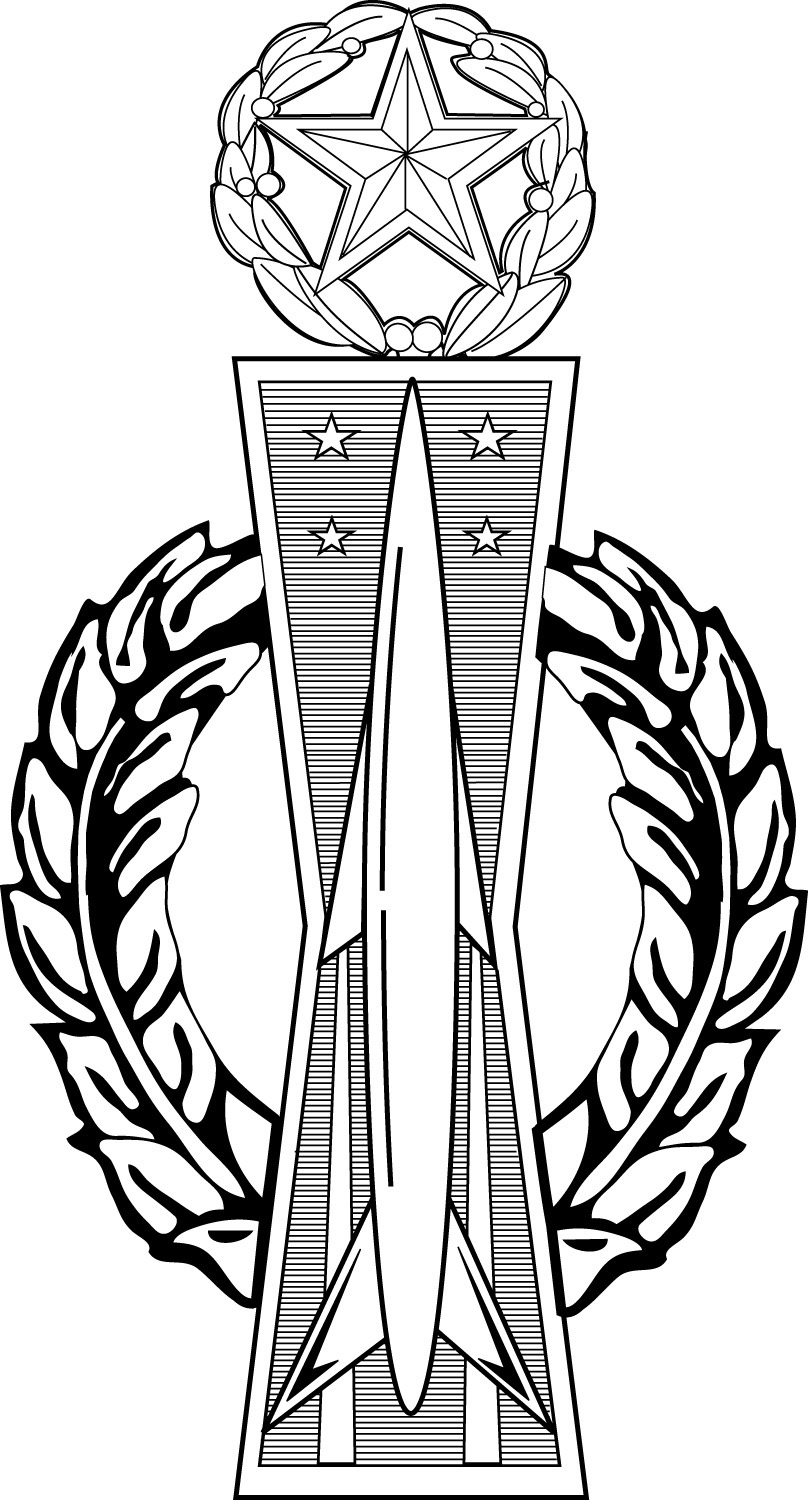
Master Space Operations Badge
Master Missile Operations Badge
Office of the Secretary of Defense Identification Badge

Air Force Distinguished Service Medal
Defense Superior Service Medal
Legion of Merit with two bronze oak leaf clusters
Defense Meritorious Service Medal
Meritorious Service Medal with two bronze oak leaf clusters
Joint Service Commendation Medal
Air Force Commendation Medal with bronze oak leaf cluster
Air Force Achievement Medal with bronze oak leaf cluster
Joint Meritorious Unit Award
Air Force Outstanding Unit Award with silver and two bronze oak leaf clusters
Air Force Organizational Excellence Award
Combat Readiness Medal
National Defense Service Medal with bronze service star
Global War on Terrorism Expeditionary Medal
Global War on Terrorism Service Medal
Nuclear Deterrence Operations Service Medal with "N" Device and three oak leaf clusters
Nuclear Deterrence Operations Service Medal (second ribbon to denote fifth award)
Air Force Expeditionary Service Ribbon with gold frame
Air Force Longevity Service Award with silver and two bronze oak leaf clusters
Air Force Basic Military Training Honor Graduate Ribbon
Air Force Training Ribbon with bronze oak leaf cluster

== Effective dates of promotion ==
Promotions
Insignia	Rank	Date
	Major General	Aug 2, 2013
	Brigadier General	May 7, 2010
	Colonel	August 1, 2003
	Lieutenant Colonel	July 1, 1999
	Major	August 1, 1996
	Captain	April 5, 1989
	First Lieutenant	April 5, 1987
	Second Lieutenant	April 5, 1985
