= Vandenberg Launch Facility 6 =

Coordinates: 34.8830°N 120.6360°W

Launch Facility 06
- Short name: LF-06
- Operator: US Air Force
- Launch pad: 1
Launch history
- Status: Inactive
- Associated rockets: Minuteman

Vandenberg Space Force Base Launch Facility 06 (LF-06) is a former US Air Force Intercontinental ballistic missile launch facility on Vandenberg SFB, California, USA. It was a launch site for the land-based LGM-30 Minuteman missile series.
