= GeneSat-1 =

NASA cubesat

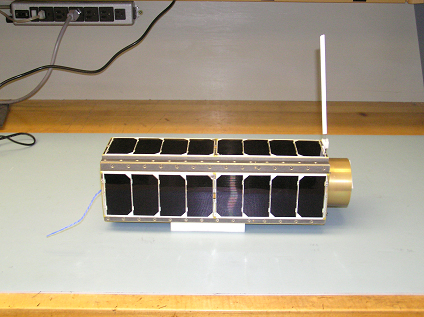
- The GeneSat-1 satellite.
- Mission type: Technology demonstration Bioscience
- Operator: NASA
- COSPAR ID: 2006-058C
- SATCAT no.: 29655
- Mission duration: 21 days (planned)

Spacecraft properties
- Spacecraft type: CubeSat
- Bus: 3U CubeSat
- Manufacturer: Ames Research Center; Stanford University
- Launch mass: 4.6 kg (10 lb)
- Dimensions: 10 cm × 10 cm × 34 cm (3.9 in × 3.9 in × 13.4 in)
- Power: 4.5 watts

Start of mission
- Launch date: 16 December 2006, 12:00:00 UTC
- Rocket: Minotaur 1
- Launch site: MARS, LP-0B
- Contractor: Orbital Sciences Corporation
- Entered service: 16 December 2010

End of mission
- Decay date: 4 August 2010

Orbital parameters
- Reference system: Geocentric orbit
- Regime: Low Earth orbit
- Perigee altitude: 413 km (257 mi)
- Apogee altitude: 420 km (260 mi)
- Inclination: 40.0°
- Period: 92.9 minutes

GeneSat-1 is a NASA fully automated, CubeSat spaceflight system that provides life support for bacteria E. Coli K-12. The system was launched into orbit on 16 December 2006, from Wallops Flight Facility. GeneSat-1 began to transmit data on its first pass over the mission's California ground station.

The nanosatellite contains onboard micro-laboratory systems such as sensors and optical systems that can detect proteins that are the products of specific genetic activity. Knowledge gained from GeneSat-1 is intended to aid scientific understanding of how spaceflight affects the human body.

Weighing 4.6 kilograms, the miniature laboratory was a secondary payload on an Air Force four-stage Minotaur 1 launch vehicle that delivered the Air Force TacSat-2 satellite to orbit. In the development of the GeneSat satellite class (at a fraction of what it normally costs to conduct a mission in space), Ames Research Center (Small Spacecraft Office) collaborated with organisations in industry and also universities local to the center. It is NASA's first fully automated, self-contained biological spaceflight experiment on a satellite of its size.
