= PharmaSat =

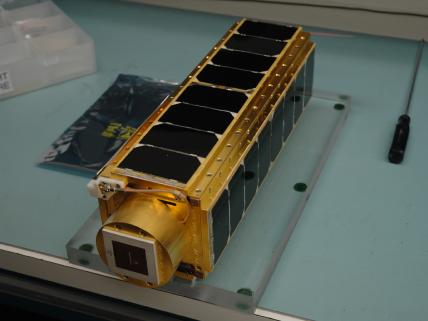
- PharmaSat undergoing preflight testing
- Mission type: Biological research
- Operator: NASA
- COSPAR ID: 2009-028B
- SATCAT no.: 35002
- Website: PharmaSat
- Mission duration: 6 months (planned); 3 years, 2 months, 25 days (final)

Spacecraft properties
- Bus: 3U CubeSat
- Manufacturer: NASA Ames Space Center
- Launch mass: 4.5 kg (9.9 lb)
- Power: Solar cells and batteries

Start of mission
- Launch date: 19 May 2009, 23:55 UTC
- Rocket: Minotaur I
- Launch site: MARS, Pad 0B
- Contractor: Orbital Sciences

End of mission
- Decay date: 14 August 2012

Orbital parameters
- Reference system: Geocentric orbit
- Regime: Low Earth orbit
- Perigee altitude: 428 km (266 mi)
- Apogee altitude: 466 km (290 mi)
- Inclination: 40.4°
- Period: 93.52 minutes

PharmaSat was a nanosatellite developed by NASA Ames Research Center which measured the influence of microgravity upon yeast resistance to an antifungal agent. As a follow on to the GeneSat-1 mission, the Ames Small Spacecraft Division conducted the PharmaSat mission in collaboration with industry and local universities.

PharmaSat was the first nanosatellite to implement biological science guided by its Principal Investigator. The mission was designed to aid the development of medicines or techniques to enable long-term crewed space travel and habitation.

== Background ==
The PharmaSat mission builds upon technology demonstrated by GeneSat-1, which used a CubeSat to study microfluidics and optics in the space environment. It was designed to provide life-support, growth, monitoring, and analysis capabilities for microorganisms.

Based, like GeneSat-1, around a three-unit CubeSat platform; PharmaSat was designed to accomplish five functions in an autonomous free-flying platform:

1. Provide life support and environmental control for growth of the yeast strain in 48 independent microwells;
2. Dose the growing yeast with antifungal agent at the appropriate point on the growth curve with three distinct, well-defined dosage levels, plus a zero-dose control;
3. Track the population of the yeast via optical density of each microwell before, during and after antifungal administration;
4. Determine well-by-well yeast viability at multiple, well-defined times after antifungal administration using a colorimetric reagent, Alamar Blue;
5. Telemeter the resulting population and viability data to Earth, along with system status data.

== Operations ==
PharmaSat was launched at 23:55 UTC on 19 May 2009 aboard a Minotaur I launch vehicle from Pad 0B at the Mid-Atlantic Regional Spaceport on Wallops Island. PharmaSat was flown as a secondary payload co-manifested with the US Air Force Air Force Research Laboratory's TacSat-3 spacecraft.

PharmaSat was successfully inserted into a low Earth orbit at approximately 459 km (285 mi) above the Earth, following which it was activated and began transmitting radio signals to two ground control stations. The primary ground station at SRI International in Menlo Park, California, transmitted mission data from the satellite to its operators, while a second station was located at Santa Clara University, whose Robotic Systems Laboratory was responsible for operating the satellite.

After establishing contact the satellite was commanded to initiate its experiment, which lasted 96 hours. Once the experiment began, PharmaSat relayed data in near real-time for up to six months. PharmaSat also carried an amateur radio beacon, with a frequency of 437.465 megahertz, which broadcast spacecraft telemetry. Amateur radio operators were asked to collect data from the spacecraft and provide it to the operators via the Mission Dashboard website.

PharmaSat decayed from orbit and reentered the atmosphere on 14 August 2012.

== See also ==
- List of CubeSats
