= TacSat-3 =

U.S. military satellite

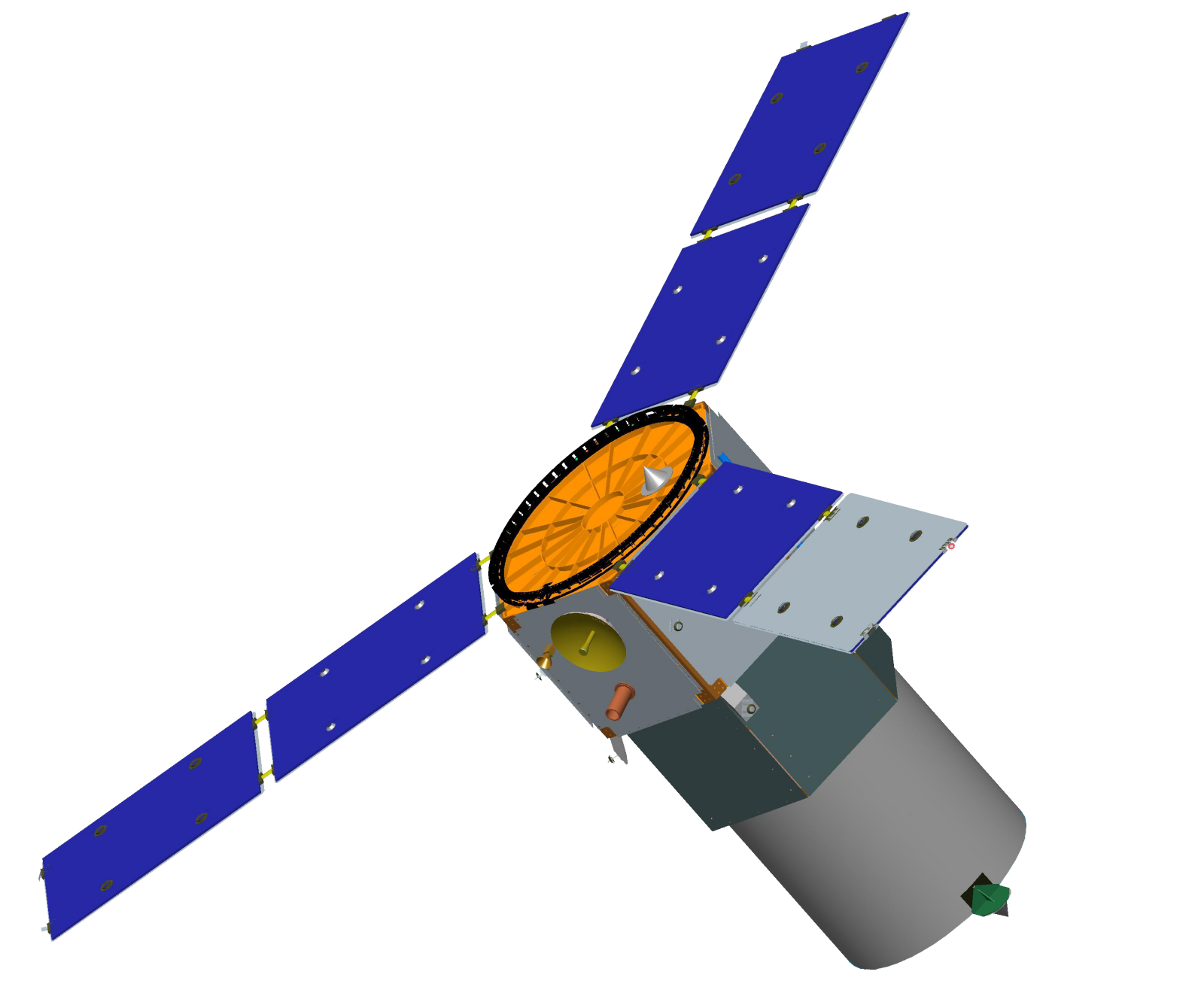
- Artist's rendering of TacSat-3 imaging satellite
- Names: JWS-D2
- Mission type: Technology, Communications
- Operator: Air Force Research Laboratory (AFRL)
- COSPAR ID: 2009-028A
- SATCAT no.: 35001
- Mission duration: 2.5 years (planned); 3 years (achieved)

Spacecraft properties
- Spacecraft: TacSat-3
- Bus: ATK
- Manufacturer: Raytheon
- Launch mass: 400 kg (880 lb)

Start of mission
- Launch date: 19 May 2009, 23:55 UTC
- Rocket: Minotaur I # 8
- Launch site: MARS, Wallops Island, LP-0B
- Contractor: Orbital Sciences Corporation

End of mission
- Last contact: 15 February 2012
- Decay date: 30 April 2012

Orbital parameters
- Reference system: Geocentric orbit
- Regime: Low Earth orbit
- Perigee altitude: 432 km (268 mi)
- Apogee altitude: 467 km (290 mi)
- Inclination: 40.40°
- Period: 93.57 minutes
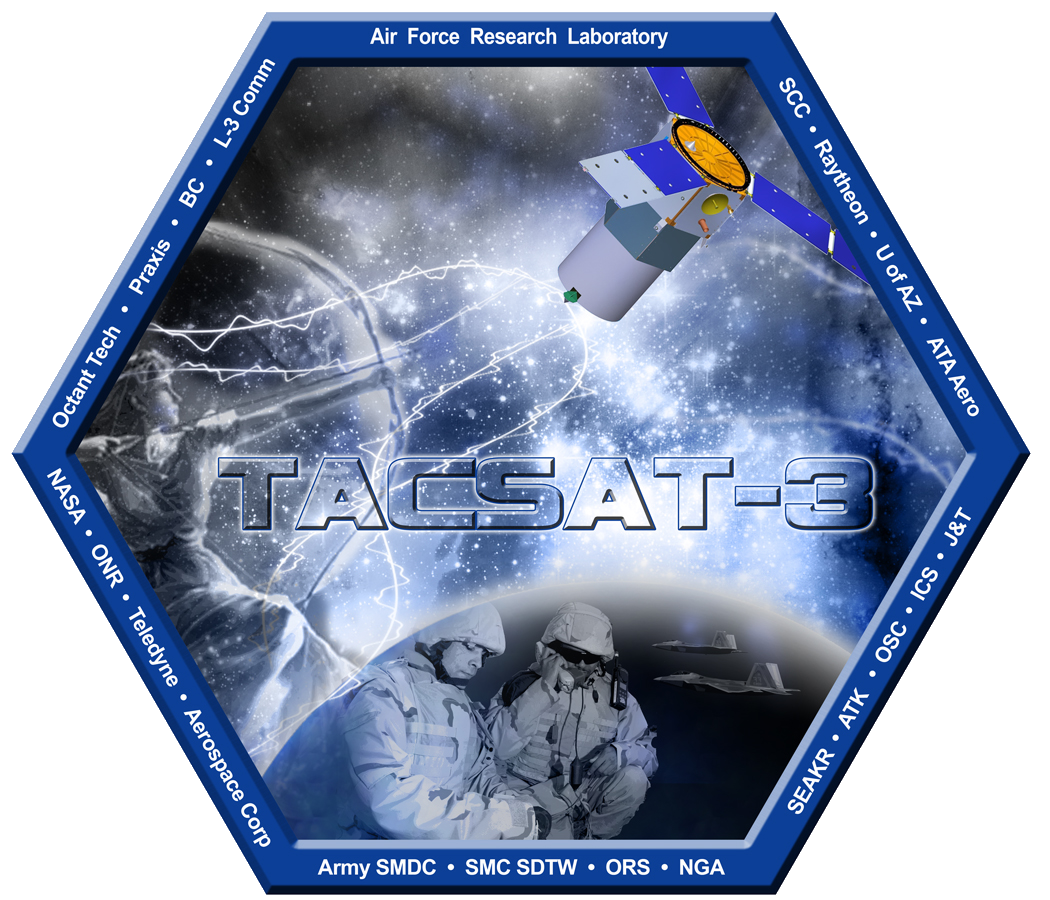
- TacSat-3 patch mission TacSat series

TacSat-3 is the second in a series of U.S. military experimental technology and communication satellites. It was assembled in an Air Force Research Laboratory (AFRL) Space Vehicles Directorate facility at Kirtland Air Force Base, New Mexico. The TacSat satellites are all designed to demonstrate the ability to provide real-time data collected from space to combatant commanders in the field.

TacSat-3 includes three distinct payloads:

- the Advanced Responsive Tactically Effective Military Imaging Spectrometer (ARTEMIS) hyperspectral imager,
- the Ocean Data Telemetry Microsatellite Link and
- the Space Avionics Experiment.

== Design ==
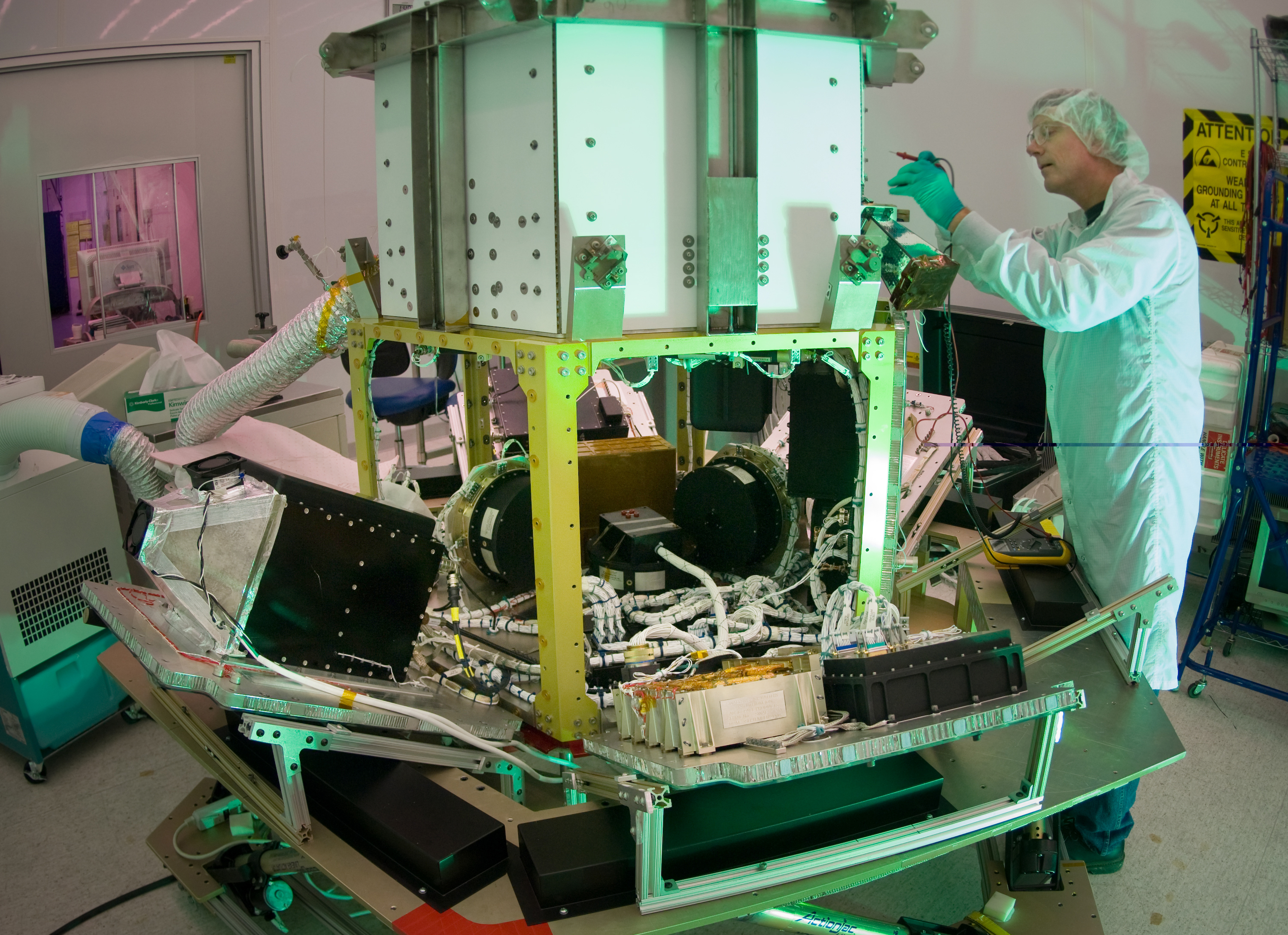
TacSat-3 bus during integration

TacSat-3 uses a standard satellite bus developed and provided by ATK.

The payload consists of a two mirror Ritchey–Chrétien telescope plus correction optics, with a focus device incorporated in the secondary mirror unit, and with a slit Offner spectrometer. The spectrometer uses the ARTEMIS hyperspectral imaging sensor (HSI), which is a single HgCdTe Focal Plane Array covering the entire V/NIR/SWIR spectrum from 400 nm to 2500 nm at a uniform resolution of 5 nm. ARTEMIS measures first the spectral information at each point on the ground in 400 spectral channels. HSI data cubes obtained by ARTEMIS are then handled by a reprogrammable digital signal processor with 16 gigabit data storage capability to generate on-board products and for in-theater downlink. TacSat-3's main focus is land-based HSI. According to Peter Wegner from the Operationally Responsive Space Office, TacSat-3 cost US$90 million.

== Launch ==
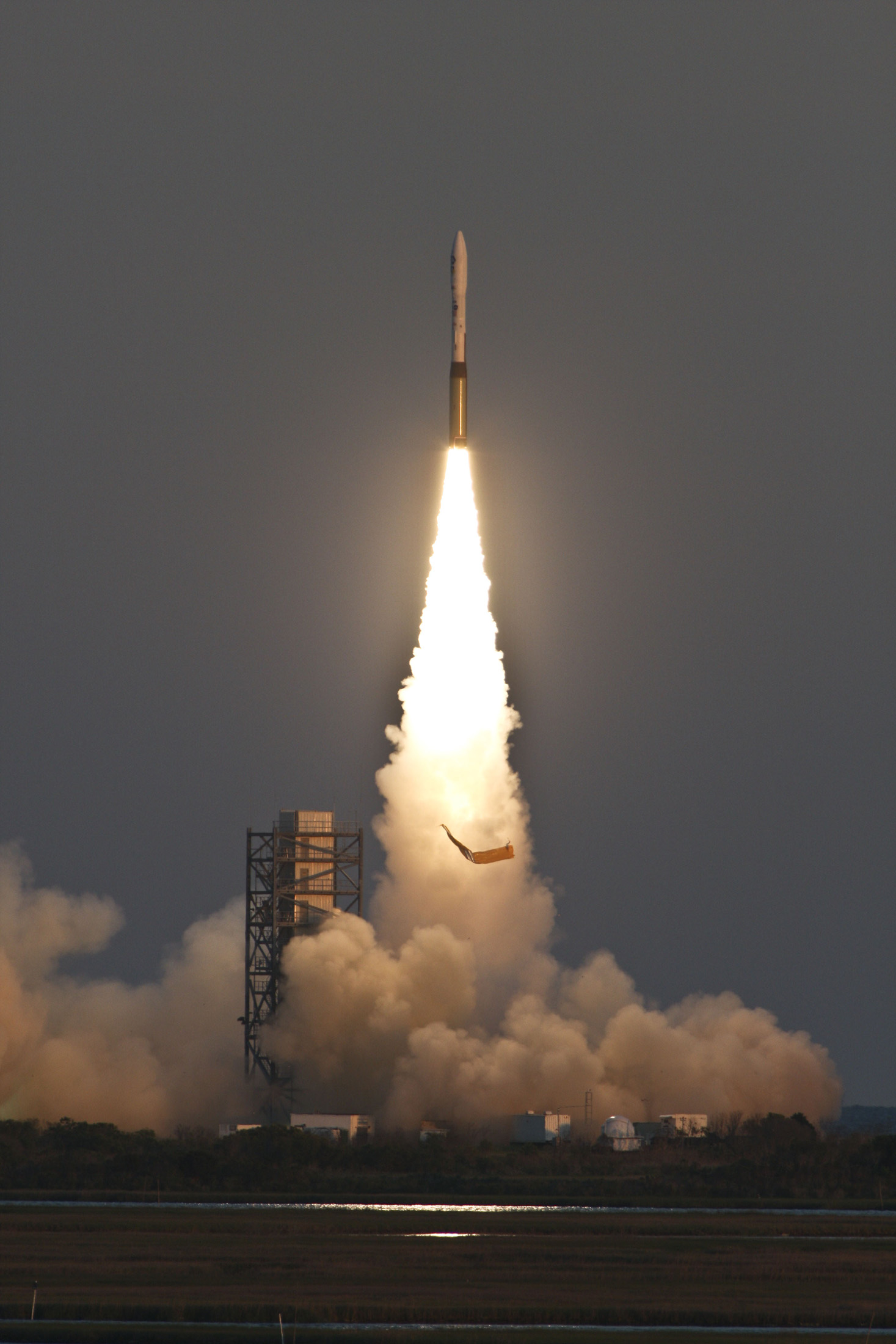
Launch of TacSat-3

In January 2009, the Air Force announced that a malfunctioning component has postponed the launch date on its Minotaur launch vehicle. However, in March 2009 it was announced that the component issues had been resolved and a launch date was set for 5 May 2009. The 5 May 2009 launch attempt was scrubbed and a new launch date was set for 19 May 2009, with a backup date of 20 May 2009. The launch occurred successfully at 23:55 UTC on 19 May 2009, 20 minutes into a launch window running from 23:35 to 03:30 UTC each night.

The first attempt to launch TacSat-3 was made on 6 May 2009, during a window running from 00:00-03:00 UTC. However, due to thunderstorms and very low ceilings which prevented the surveillance plane from taking off, this launch attempt was scrubbed and the next attempt was scheduled for 8 May 2009 during the same window. The 8 May 2009 attempt was also scrubbed due to thunderstorms and heavy rain, which once again, prevented the surveillance plane from being able to take off. Another attempt was scheduled for the next day on 9 May 2009, again with the same window. Although the weather cooperated better for the 9 May 2009 attempt, a launch support equipment problem caused a delay of approximately three hours past the scheduled launch time. This problem was resolved and the countdown resumed. However, with 2 minutes and 16 seconds left on the countdown clock, an unexpected hold was called. Several minutes later, this launch attempt was also scrubbed due to low electrical voltage on the AGC of the Flight Termination System. A new launch date was set for 19 May 2009 with 20 May 2009 as a backup date.

The spacecraft was successfully launched at 23:55 UTC on 19 May 2009 after a small delay to remove off shore boaters from the exclusion area.

== Mission ==
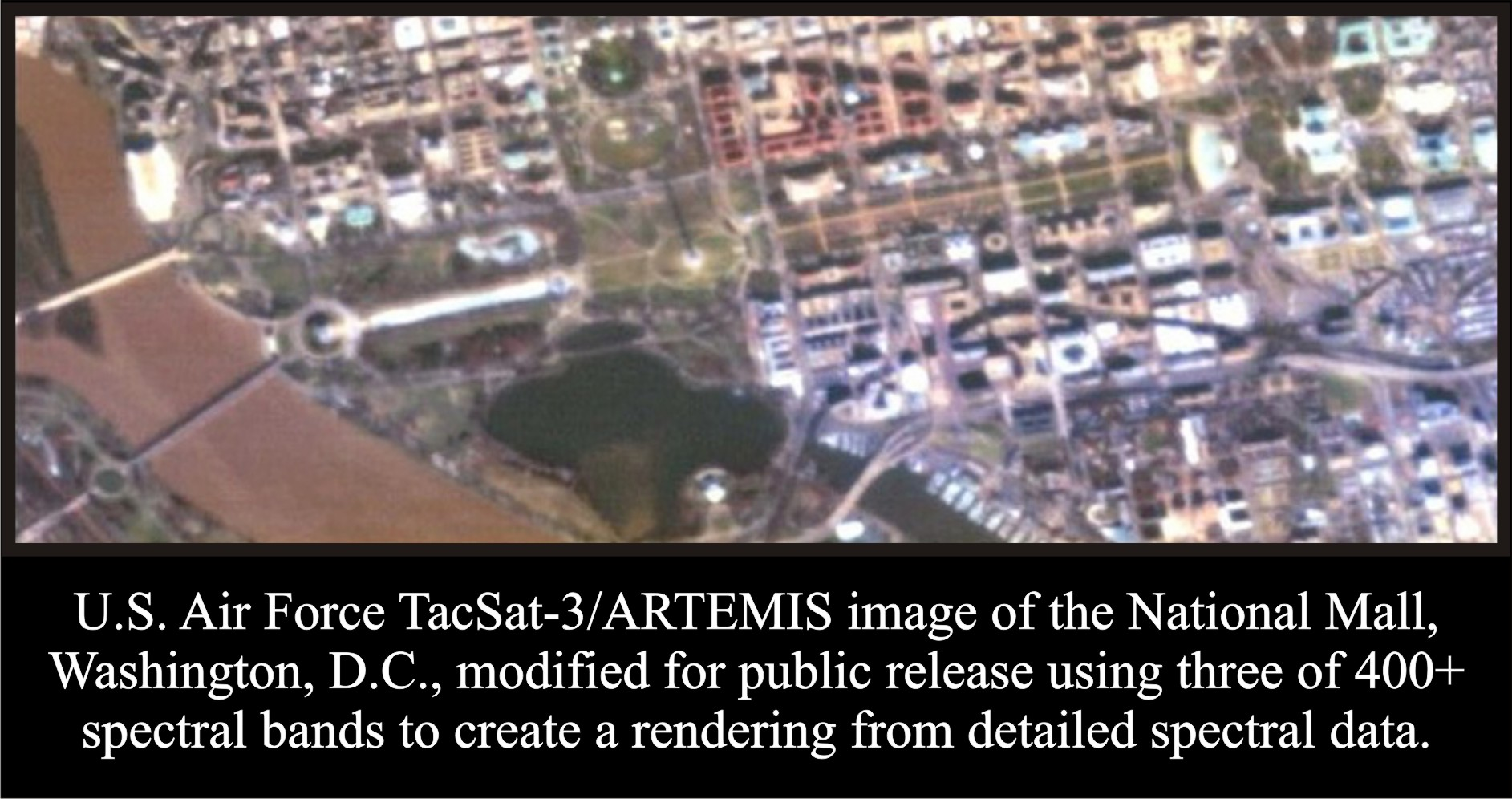
ARTEMIS image of the National Mall

TacSat-3 achieved a HSI ground resolution of 4 meters, which enabled it to detect and identify tactical targets. After a successful completion of a one-year experimental phase, and the acquisition of more than 2100 images, TacSat-3 was handed over to the Air Force in June 2010 as a full-time operational asset. It is the first hyperspectral satellite with the ability to provide reconnaissance within 10 minutes after passing overhead. Field commanders using tactical radio equipment, such as the AN/PRC-117F Multiband Manpack Radio, can directly communicate with the satellite in the ultra high frequency (UHF) band. TacSat-3/ARTEMIS observations of the National Mall and the Kilauea Volcano to support technical validation of the sensor have been released in June 2010. The released images comprise three of the more than 400 spectral bands.

TacSat-3 completed operations on 15 February 2012. On 30 April 2012, following the decay of its orbit, TacSat-3 reentered the Earth's atmosphere and burned up.

== Gallery ==
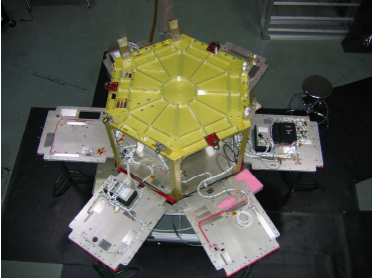
TacSat-3 bus during integration

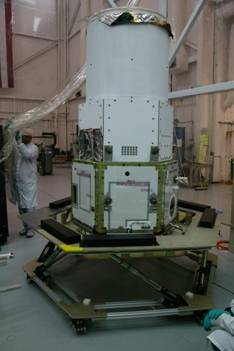
TacSat-3 at final integration and testing

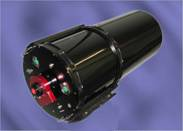
35 cm Ritchey-Chrétien telescope

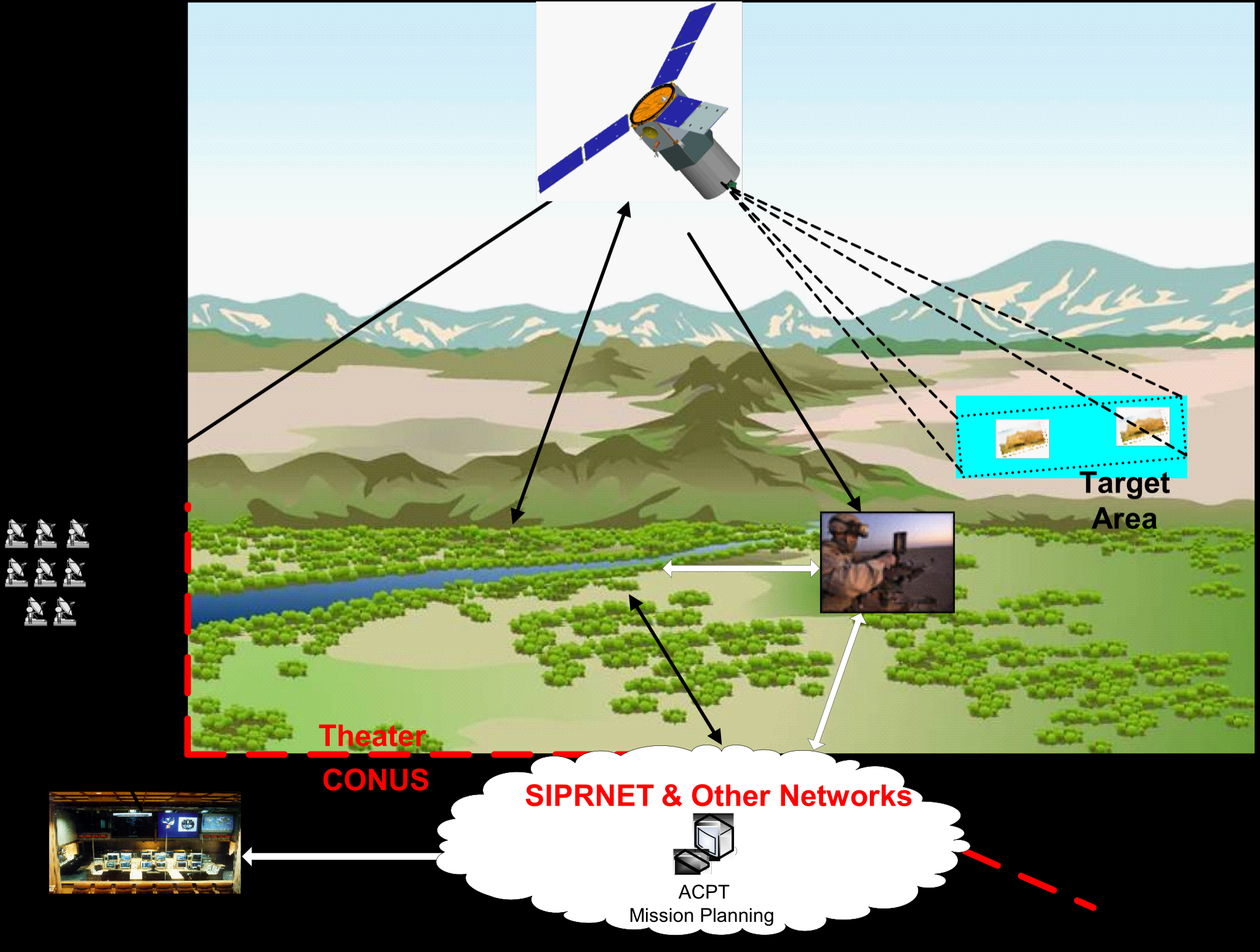
Tactical theater reconnaissance
