= Polymer Battery Experiment =

The Polymer Battery Experiment (PBEX) demonstrates the charging and discharging characteristics of polymer batteries in the space environment. PBEX validates use of lightweight, flexible battery technology to decrease cost and weight for future military and commercial space systems. PBEX was developed by Johns Hopkins University and is one of four On Orbit Mission Control (OOMC) packages on PicoSat 9:

- Polymer Battery Experiment
- Ionospheric Occultation Experiment
- Coherent Electromagnetic Radio Tomography
- Optical Precision Platform Experiment

== Specifications ==
- NSSDC ID: 2001-043B-03
- Mission: PicoSAT 9

== Sources ==
- NASA: Picosat Experiment Package 2001-043B-03 Mainpage

== See also ==
- Batteries in space
