= Athena (rocket family) =

Lockheed Martin expendable launch system

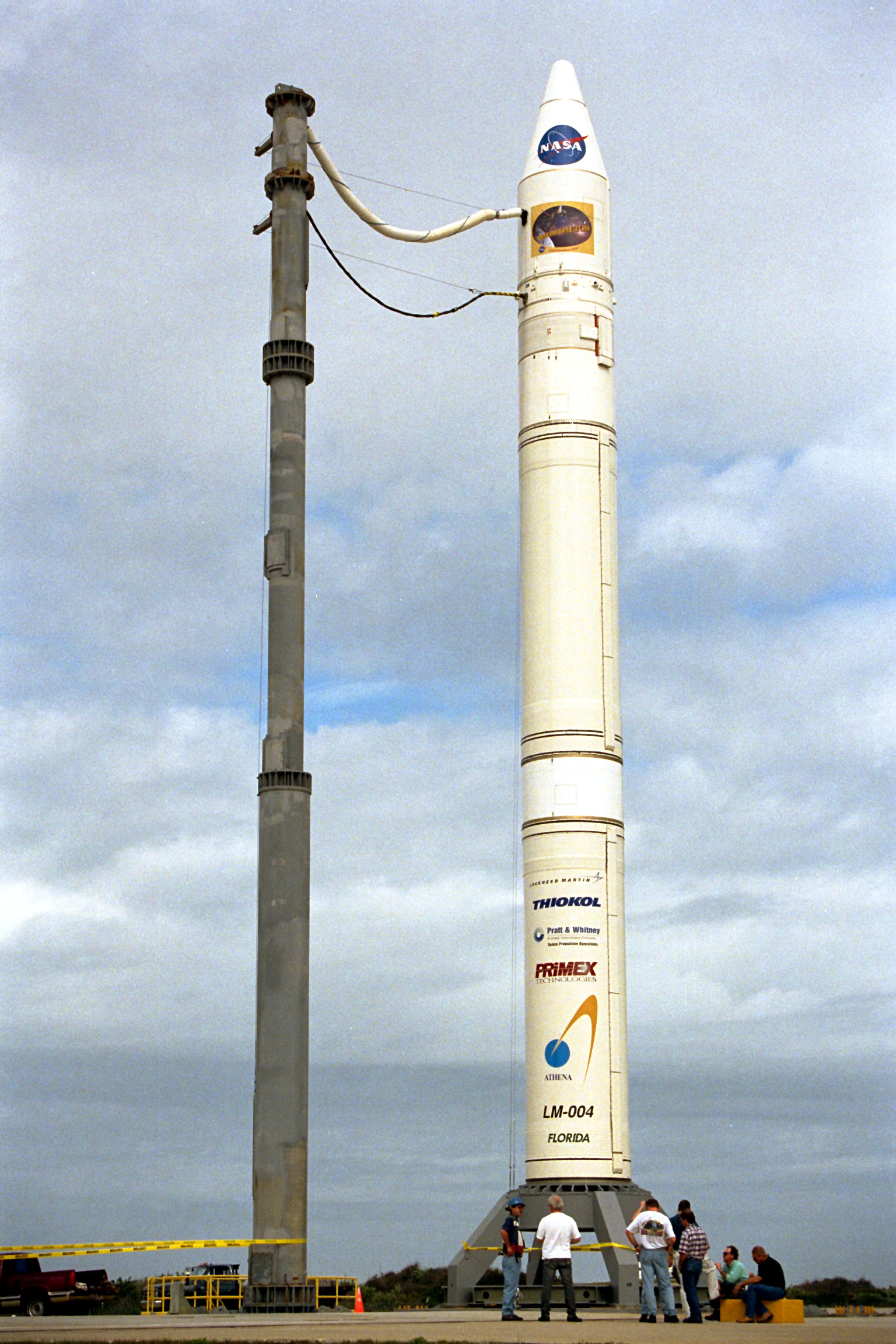
- Athena II with Lunar Prospector
- Function: Small, modular component launch vehicle
- Manufacturer: Lockheed Martin; Alliant Techsystems
- Country of origin: United States

Size
- Height: 19.8 - 30.48 m (65 - 100 ft)
- Diameter: 2.36 m (92 in)
- Mass: 66,344 - 120,202 kg (146,264 - 265,000 lb)
- Stages: 2 or 3

Capacity

Payload to LEO
- Mass: 794–1,896 kg (1,750–4,180 lb)

Launch history
- Status: Retired
- Launch sites: Cape Canaveral LC-46; Vandenberg AFB SLC-6; Kodiak Launch Complex
- Total launches: 7 For breakdown by variant, see text. Launch data.
- Success(es): 5
- Failure: 2
- First flight: August 15, 1995
- Last flight: September 30, 2001
- Carries passengers or cargo: Lunar Prospector

First stage – Castor 120
- Powered by: 1
- Maximum thrust: 1,900 kN (430,000 lb_{f})
- Specific impulse: 280 s (2.7 km/s)
- Burn time: 83.4 seconds
- Propellant: Class 1.3 HTPB/AP

Second stage – ORBUS 21D
- Powered by: 1
- Maximum thrust: 194 kN (44,000 lb_{f})
- Specific impulse: 293 s (2.87 km/s)
- Burn time: 150 seconds
- Propellant: Class 1.3 HTPB/AP

Athena was a 1990s Lockheed Martin expendable launch system which underwent several name changes in its lifetime.

Development began at the Lockheed Corporation in 1993, where the design was known as the Lockheed Launch Vehicle. The name was subsequently changed to the Lockheed Martin Launch Vehicle when Lockheed merged with Martin Marietta. In 1997 the name was finally changed to Athena, and all of the launches after the demonstration flight in August 1995 were conducted using that name. Athena was retired from service in 2001, but in September 2010 Athena was added to NASA's Launch Services II contract. It was announced that it would be put back into production, with launches set to resume in 2012. All production had ceased by March 2017.

== Variants ==
The Athena comes in two versions, Athena I and Athena II. The Athena I has two stages, the Thiokol Castor-120 first stage and a Pratt & Whitney ORBUS 21D upper stage, both powered by solid propellant. The Athena II has three stages, the Castor-120 first and second stages, and an ORBUS 21D upper stage. For future flights, the Athena Ic and Athena IIc configurations would use Castor 30 stages instead of the Orbus 21D stages on the original versions.

The Athena rocket uses an Orbit Adjust Module (OAM) developed by Primex Technologies. Primex was acquired by General Dynamics in 2001. For the September 28, 2001 Athena launch, the OAM was built by General Dynamics Space Propulsion Systems of Redmond, WA. The OAM houses the attitude control system and avionics subsystem (guidance and navigation, batteries, telemetry transmitters, command and destruct receivers and antennas). This 1 meter (3.3 feet) long module is fueled with monopropellant hydrazine. After payload separation, the OAM performs a contamination and collision avoidance maneuver, distancing itself from the payload and burning any remaining fuel to depletion. Athena solid rocket motor provider Alliant Techsystems (ATK) produces integrated upper stages using spin-stabilized or 3-axis stabilized Star solid motors that can provide higher velocities for GEO and escape (e.g. lunar and planetary) missions. Such an integrated upper stage based on a 2531 lb Star 37FM was employed for the launch of Lunar Prospector, the first lunar probe launched by a commercially developed launch vehicle.

=== Athena III ===
==== 1990s proposal ====
An Athena III rocket was originally planned and designated the LLV-3 in the 1990s according to the original patent. It was never developed, because of the lack of customer interest. It was to add two, four or six Castor-4A strap-on boosters to the first stage of the stack, and would have been capable of launching 3.6 tons to low Earth orbit.

==== PlanetSpace proposal ====
The designation was later reused for a proposed rocket for the Commercial Orbital Transportation Services project. Sometime after 2005, PlanetSpace reused the Athena III designation for a 2.8-million-pound-thrust shuttle-derived space station resupply booster rocket, in a joint venture with Lockheed Martin and Alliant Techsystems (ATK). In March 2012, Lockheed Martin selected Alaska's Kodiak Launch Complex (KLC) as its dedicated West Coast launch facility for Athena rockets, clearing the way for Alaska Aerospace Corporation to begin expanding the facilities. At the time, Lockheed Martin declared that they would decide whether to proceed with Athena III "in the next few months" but no such announcement was made in the following years.

Athena III was to feature a 2 1/2-segment Space Shuttle Solid Rocket Booster (SRB) derived reusable solid rocket booster (RSRB) first stage topped by one Castor 120, one Castor 30 and an OAMS orbit adjust module. Athena III would have been capable of placing a 4,600 kg (10,100 lb) satellite in polar orbit from Kodiak, or launch a 5,900 kg (13,000 lb) satellite from the East Coast into an orbit due east; however an East Coast launch site had not been selected. Kodiak was selected over heavily booked Vandenberg to avoid delays in high-priority rapid-response launches for the U.S. military.

== Launches ==
=== List of launches ===
Flight number	Date (UTC)	Vehicle type	Launch site	Payload	Result	Remarks
1	August 15, 1995; 22:30	Athena I (DLV)	VAFB SLC-6	Gemstar 1 (VitaSat 1) (113 kg)	Failure	
2	August 23, 1997; 06:51	Athena I (LM-002)	VAFB SLC-6	Lewis (404 kg)	Success	Payload failed after 3 days in orbit
3	January 7, 1998; 02:28	Athena II (LM-004)	CCAFS SLC-46	Lunar Prospector (295 kg)	Success	
4	January 27, 1999; 00:34	Athena I (LM-006)	CCAFS SLC-46	Chunghua 1 (ROCSAT 1, Formosat-1), (410 kg)	Success	
5	April 27, 1999; 18:22	Athena II (LM-005)	VAFB SLC-6	Ikonos-1 (726 kg)	Failure	
6	September 24, 1999; 18:21	Athena II (LM-007)	VAFB SLC-6	Ikonos-2 (726 kg)	Success	
7	September 30, 2001; 02:40	Athena I (LM-001)	KLC LC-1	Starshine 3 (90 kg), PicoSAT (68 kg), PCSat (10 kg), SAPPHIRE (18 kg)	Success	Kodiak Launch Complex's first orbital launch.

=== Launch failures ===
==== Gemstar 1 (VitaSat 1) launch failure ====
On August 15, 1995, an Athena-1 rocket (vehicle DLV), failed during launch. Expended hydraulic fluid burned in first stage aft section, damaging nozzle feedback cables causing loss of gimbal control and tumbling. Separately, arcing in the IMU high-voltage power supply caused loss of attitude reference. Flight terminated by range safety officer at T+160 s.

==== IKONOS-1 launch failure ====
On April 27, 1999, an Athena-2 rocket (vehicle LM-005), failed during launch. The payload fairing failed to separate, and the extra weight prevented the vehicle from reaching orbit. During the fairing separation event, the shock of the circumferential ordnance firing disconnected the cable carrying the signal to fire the longitudinal ordnance.
