= Athena I =

American small space launch rocket

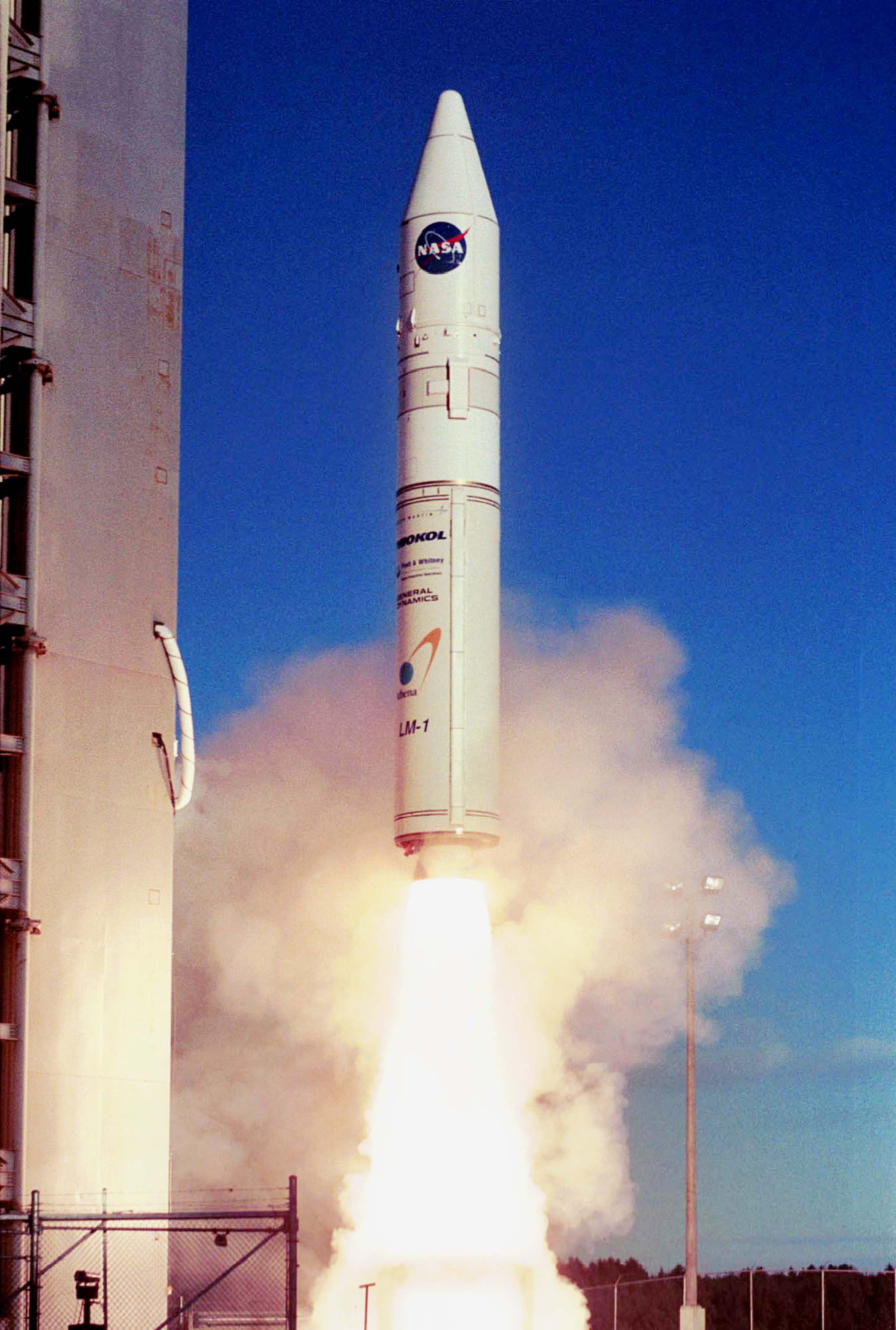
- Launch of an Athena I on the Kodiak Star mission.
- Function: Small expendable launch system
- Manufacturer: Lockheed Martin; Alliant Techsystems
- Country of origin: United States

Size
- Height: 18.9 metres (62 ft)
- Diameter: 2.36 metres (7 ft 9 in)
- Mass: 66,300 kilograms (146,200 lb)
- Stages: Three

Capacity

Payload to LEO
- Mass: 820 kilograms (1,810 lb)

Payload to SSO
- Mass: 360 kilograms (790 lb)

Associated rockets
- Family: Athena
- Based on: LGM-118 Peacekeeper
- Derivative work: Athena II
- Comparable: Falcon 1 Minotaur IV; Taurus

Launch history
- Status: Retired
- Launch sites: Cape Canaveral LC-46; Vandenberg AFB SLC-6; Kodiak Launch Complex
- Total launches: 4
- Success(es): 3
- Failure(s): 1
- First flight: 15 August 1995
- Last flight: 30 September 2001

First stage – Castor 120
- Powered by: 1 solid
- Maximum thrust: 1,900 kilonewtons (430,000 lb_{f})
- Specific impulse: 280 sec
- Burn time: 83 seconds
- Propellant: HTPB/AP

Second stage – Orbus 21D
- Powered by: 1 solid
- Maximum thrust: 189.2 kilonewtons (42,500 lb_{f})
- Specific impulse: 293 sec
- Burn time: 150 seconds
- Propellant: HTPB/AP

Third stage – OAM
- Powered by: 4 MR-107
- Maximum thrust: 882 newtons (198 lb_{f})
- Specific impulse: 222 sec
- Burn time: 1,500 seconds
- Propellant: Hydrazine

The Athena I, known as the Lockheed Launch Vehicle (LLV) at the time of its first flight and Lockheed Martin Launch Vehicle (LMLV) at the time of its second flight, was an American small expendable launch system which was used for four launches between 1995 and 2001. It is a member of the Athena family of rockets, along with the larger Athena II.

The Athena I is a three-stage rocket, consisting of solid first and second stages, and a monopropellant liquid-fuelled third stage. The first stage is a Castor 120, which is also used on some versions of the Taurus rocket. An Orbus 21D motor was used as the second stage on launches up to 2001. The third stage is an Orbital Adjustment Module, fuelled by hydrazine and propelled by four MR-107 engines, which is used for final insertion.

Prior to its retirement in 2001, Athena I launches were made from Space Launch Complex 6 at Vandenberg Air Force Base, Launch Complex 46 at Spaceport Florida, and Pad 1 of the Kodiak Launch Complex.

Four Athena I launches have been conducted, with one failure. Its maiden flight was conducted from SLC-6 at Vandenberg, and lifted off at 22:30 UTC on 15 August 1995. It was intended to place GemStar-1 into orbit, however the rocket was destroyed by the range safety officer after the failure of its thrust vectoring system resulted in a loss of control. The launch was the first from SLC-6, which had originally been built for the Titan III rocket for launches of the Manned Orbital Laboratory, and was later rebuilt for polar orbit Space Shuttle launches. Both MOL and polar Shuttle flights were cancelled before any launches were made from SLC-6. The next Athena I launch was on 23 August 1997, and successfully placed the Lewis satellite into orbit for NASA. This launch also took place from SLC-6 at Vandenberg. The third Athena I launch was from LC-46 at Spaceport Florida, and took place on 27 January 1999. The payload, ROCSAT-1, was the first satellite to be operated by the Republic of China. The fourth launch, which was conducted on 30 September 2001, was the first orbital launch to be made from Kodiak Island. Known as the Kodiak Star mission, it successfully placed the Starshine 3, PicoSAT 9, PCSat and SAPPHIRE satellites into orbit.

== See also ==
- ALV X-1
- Comparison of small lift launch systems
- Comparison of solid-fuelled orbital launch systems
- Antares (rocket)
