= On Orbit Mission Control =

PicoSat experiment

The On-Orbit Mission Control will be conducted by the Surrey Satellite Technology Ltd ground site in Guildford, UK. The United States Air Force Academy at Colorado Springs, Colorado will operate a backup ground station for PicoSAT satellite to increase the amount of experimental data.

On-Orbit Mission Control consists of four packages on PicoSat 9:

- Polymer Battery Experiment, a plastic battery technology demonstration funded by Johns Hopkins Applied Physics Laboratory
- Ionospheric Occultation Experiment, a horizontal electron density mapping of the ionosphere funded by the United States Air Force and The Aerospace Corporation
- Coherent Electromagnetic Radio Tomography, a vertical electron density mapping of the ionosphere funded by the Naval Research Laboratory
- Optical Precision Platform Experiment, an anti-vibration platform demonstration funded by the Air Force Research Laboratory

== Background ==
Section source: Gunters Spsace Page

The PICOSat satellite is funded out of the Department of Defense (DoD) Space Test Program (STP) and the Foreign Comparative Testing Program which is carried out by the Air Force.

The PICOSat objectives are flown to operate the four scientific payloads demonstrating and performing vibration damping, battery technologies, and performing ionospheric measurements for DoD weather databases. PICOSat is designed for a minimum of one year of on orbit operations.

== Specifications ==
- NSSDC ID: 2001-043B-04
- Mission: PicoSAT 9
- Size: 67 kg
- Orbit: 800 km circular
- Inclination: 67 degrees
- Externals: gravity gradient boom for stabilization
- Output: 22 watts
- Propulsion: none

Additional source: Gunters
