= Castor (rocket stage) =

Solid-fuel orbital vehicle component

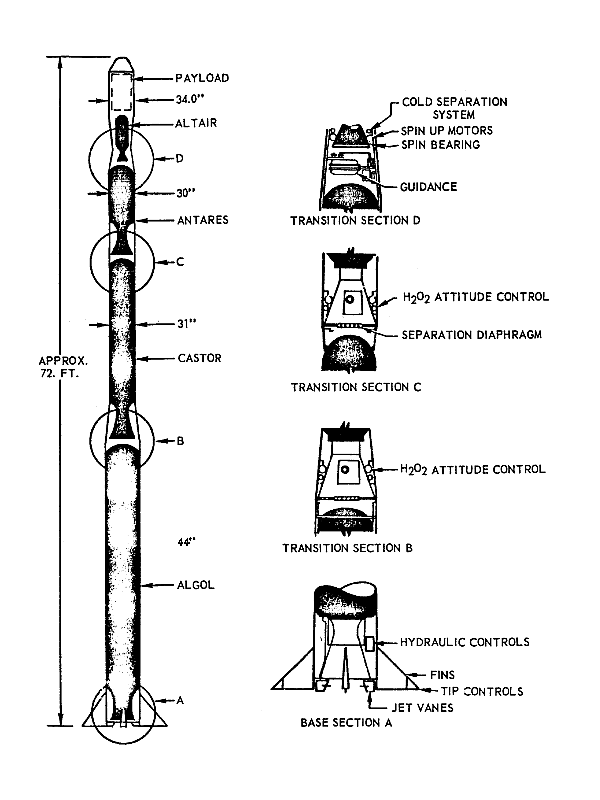
Diagram showing the use of a Castor as the second stage of a Scout vehicle

Castor is a family of solid-fuel rocket stages and boosters built by Thiokol (now Northrop Grumman) and used on a variety of launch vehicles. They were initially developed as the second-stage motor of the Scout rocket. The design was based on the MGM-29 Sergeant, a surface-to-surface missile developed for the United States Army at the Jet Propulsion Laboratory.

== Versions ==
=== Flown versions ===
==== Castor 1 ====
The Castor 1 (TX-33) was first used for a successful suborbital launch of a Scout X-1 rocket on September 2, 1960.
It was 19.42 feet (5.92 m) long, 2.6 feet (0.79 m) in diameter, and had a burn time of 27 seconds. Castor 1 stages were also used as strap-on boosters for launch vehicles using Thor first stages, including the Delta D. (A Delta-D was used in 1964 to launch Syncom-3, the first satellite placed in a geostationary orbit.) Castor 1 stages were used in 141 launch attempts of Scout and Delta rockets, only 2 of which were failures. They were also used on some thrust-assisted Thor-Agena launchers. The last launch using a Castor 1 was in 1971.

==== Castor 2 ====
The Castor 2 (TX-354-3, X-354-4, X-354-5) was an upgraded version of the Castor 1. It was first used on a Scout in 1965, and continued to be used on Scouts until the last Scout launch, in 1994. Castor 2 stages were also used as the strap-on boosters for the Delta E, and for the Japanese-built N-I, N-II and H-I rockets. It retained the same diameter as the Castor 1, and was from 5.96 m to 6.27 m in length.

==== Castor 4 ====
The Castor 4 (TX-526), along with its A and B variants (TX-780-1, TX-780-2, TX-780-3, TX-780-4, TX-780-5, TX-780XL, TX-780B, TX-859), were expanded to 1.02 m in diameter. They were used as strap-ons on some Delta, Delta II, Atlas IIAS, and Athena RTV launch vehicles. They were also planned to serve as the first stage of the Spanish Capricornio booster, however, no such flights occurred before the project was cancelled.
Castor 4B is used in the European Maxus Programme, with launches from Esrange in Sweden.
Certain versions of the H-IIA rockets flown by JAXA used either two or four strap-on boosters developed and produced by Alliant Techsystems. These boosters use motors which are modified versions of the Castor 4A-XL (TX-780XL) motor design. These motors are 38 feet (11.6 m) long and roughly 40 inches (1.02 m) in diameter.

==== Castor 30 ====
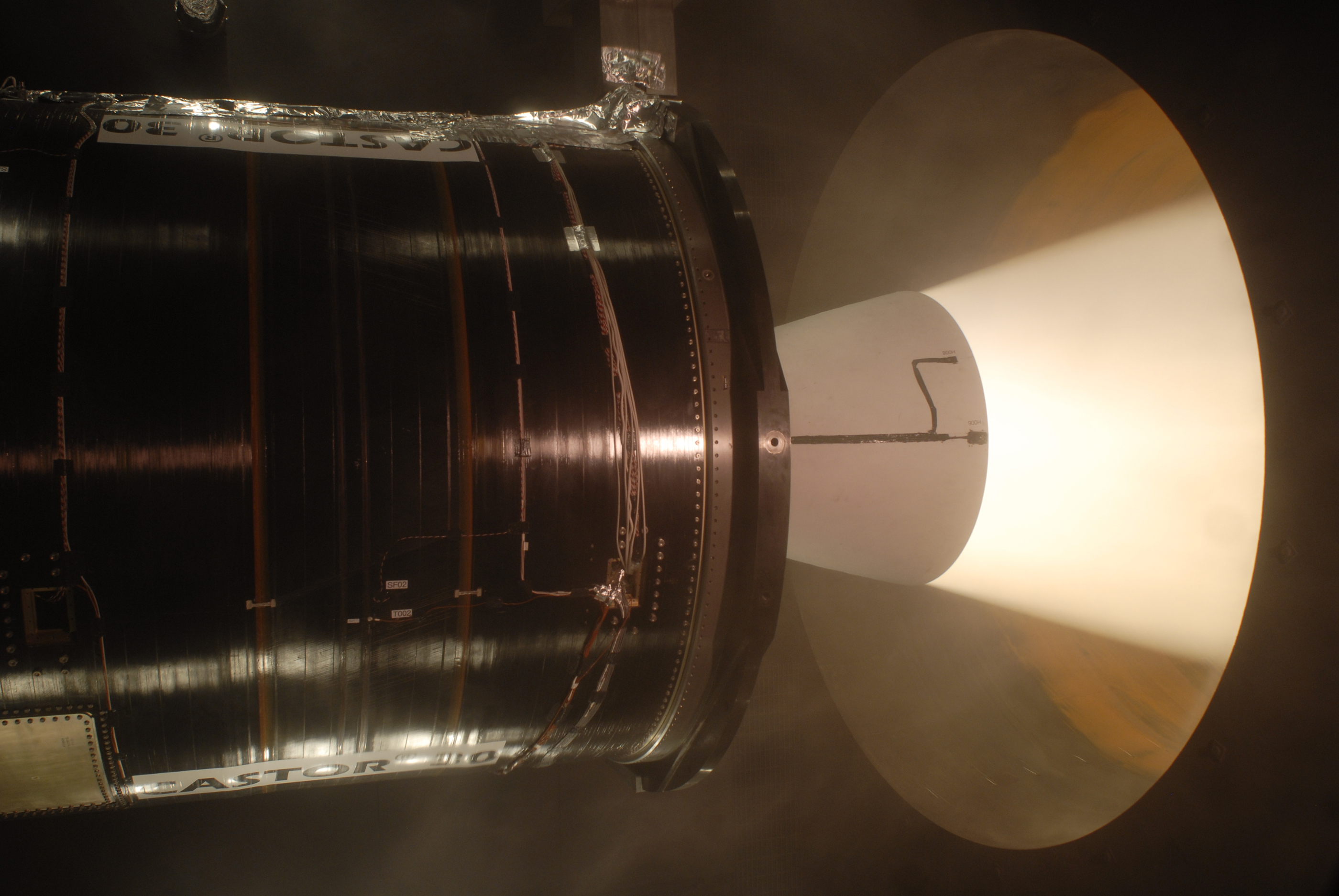
Castor 30 rocket motor being ground-tested

The CASTOR 30 motor is based on the CASTOR 120 motor, which has flown on the Taurus I, Athena I and Athena II launch vehicles. The inaugural flight of the new motor occurred in April 2013 as the second stage on the Orbital Sciences Antares medium-lift rocket for International Space Station resupply missions.
The CASTOR 30 upper stage measures 138 inches (3.5 m) in length and 92 inches (2.3 m) in diameter, and it weighs 30,000 pounds (14,000 kg). The motor is nominally designed as an upper stage that can function as a second or third stage as well, depending on the vehicle configuration.
The CASTOR 30XL solid rocket motor measures 236 inches (6.0 m) in length and 92 inches (2.3 m) in diameter, and it weighs approximately 56,000 pounds (25,000 kg). The nozzle is eight feet long with a submerged design with a high performance expansion ratio (56:1) and a dual density exit cone.

==== Castor 120 ====
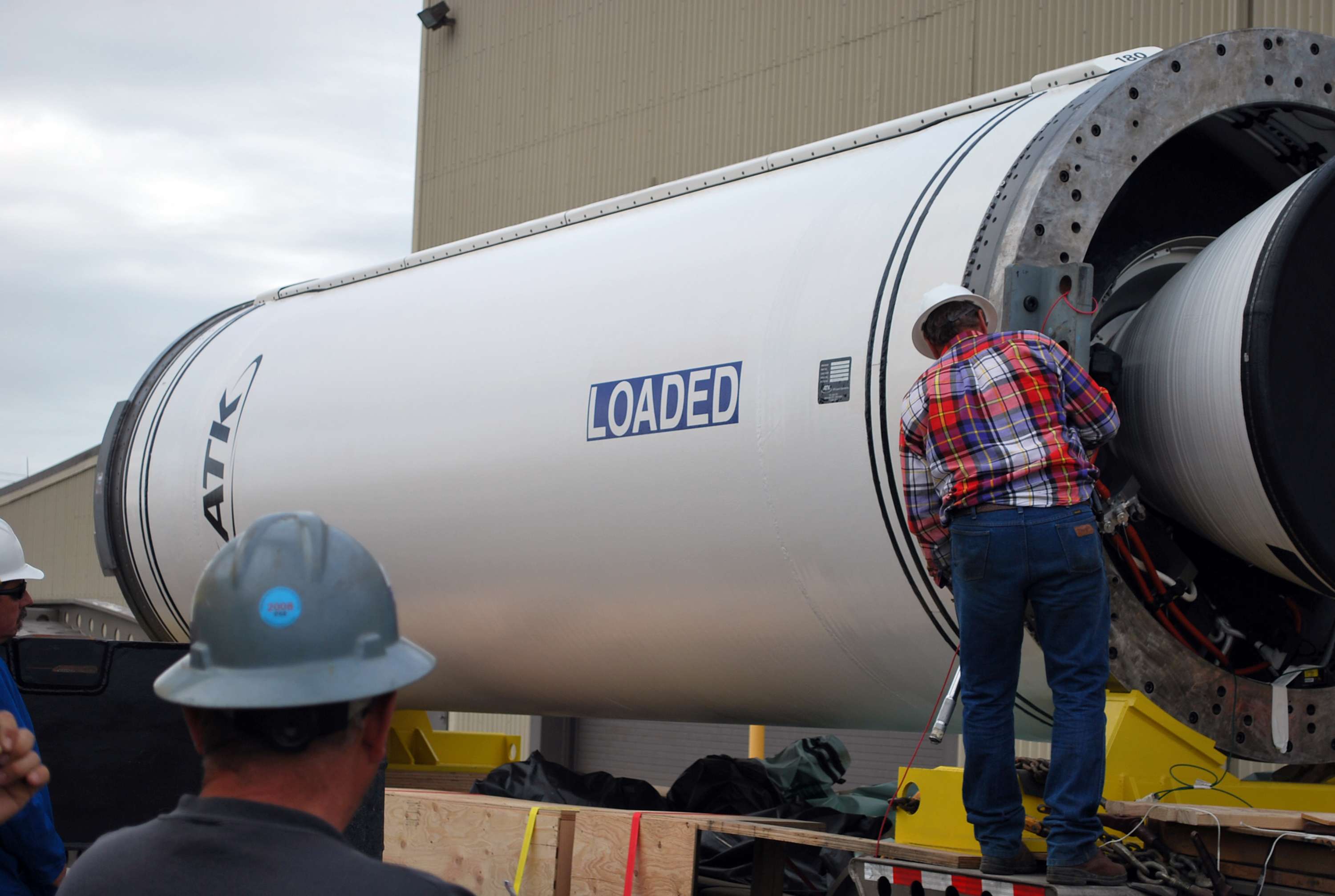
A Castor 120 that was used as Stage 0 of a Taurus XL rocket for the OCO launch

An unrelated development to the earlier Castor 1, 2 and 4, the Castor 120 is a derivative of the first-stage motor of the MX ("Peacekeeper") missile. "120" refers to the planned weight, in thousands of pounds, of the booster at project inception. The actual product turned out lighter than this, however. It was first used as the first-stage motor of Lockheed Martin's Athena I, and later the first and second stages of Athena II. After a test launch in August 1995, the first launch of a customer payload took place on August 22, 1997, when an Athena was used to launch the NASA Lewis satellite. In 2006 Orbital Sciences Corporation agreed to pay $17.5 million for the Castor 120 motors used in the Taurus XL launch vehicles for the Orbiting Carbon Observatory and Glory satellites. The main solid rocket boosters (SRB-A) of the Japanese H-IIA launch vehicle are based on the Castor 120, and were jointly designed by ATK and IHI Aerospace.

=== Proposed versions - based on Space Shuttle SRB ===
Instead of using a D6AC steel case and PBAN binder like the Space Shuttle SRB, these will use the technology derived from the GEM motors which have carbon composite cases and HTPB binder. The carbon composite design eliminates the factory joint common on all Space Shuttle SRBs.

==== Castor 300 ====
The CASTOR 300 motor is a proposed booster based on the Space Shuttle Solid Rocket Booster and was intended to be used as the second stage of the OmegA. The inaugural flight of the new motor was suggested to occur as soon as 2021.
Based on a 1-segment Space Shuttle SRB, the Castor 300 measures 499.6 inches (12.69 m) in length and 146.1 inches (3.71 m) in diameter, and it weighs approximately 300,000 pounds (140,000 kg).

==== Castor 600 ====
The CASTOR 600 motor is a proposed booster based on the Space Shuttle Solid Rocket Booster and was intended to be used as the first stage of the OmegA's small configurations. The inaugural flight of the new motor was suggested to occur as soon as 2021.
Based on a 2-segment Space Shuttle SRB, the Castor 600 measures 860 inches (22 m) in length and 146.1 inches (3.71 m) in diameter, and it weighs approximately 600,000 pounds (270,000 kg).

==== Castor 1200 ====
The CASTOR 1200 motor is a proposed booster based on the Space Shuttle Solid Rocket Booster and was intended to be used as the first stage of the OmegA's heavy configuration. The inaugural flight of the new motor was suggested to occur in the 2020s. It has also been proposed to replace the 5 segment RSRMVs on the Block 2 Space Launch System.
Based on a 4-segment Space Shuttle SRB, the Castor 1200 measures 1,476.3 inches (37.50 m) in length and 146.1 inches (3.71 m) in diameter, and it weighs approximately 1,200,000 pounds (540,000 kg).

== See also ==
- Antares (rocket), launch vehicle by Northrop Grumman Corporation using Castor 30
- Atlas II
- Graphite-Epoxy Motor
- Little Joe
- Minotaur-C, launch vehicle by Northrop Grumman Corporation using Castor 120
- Thrust Augmented Thor
- Maxus, a European microgravity programme using Castor 4B
- Athena (rocket family)
- Strypi (used Castor as second stage)
