= Starshine 3 =

American amateur radio satellite

Starshine 3 / OSCAR 43
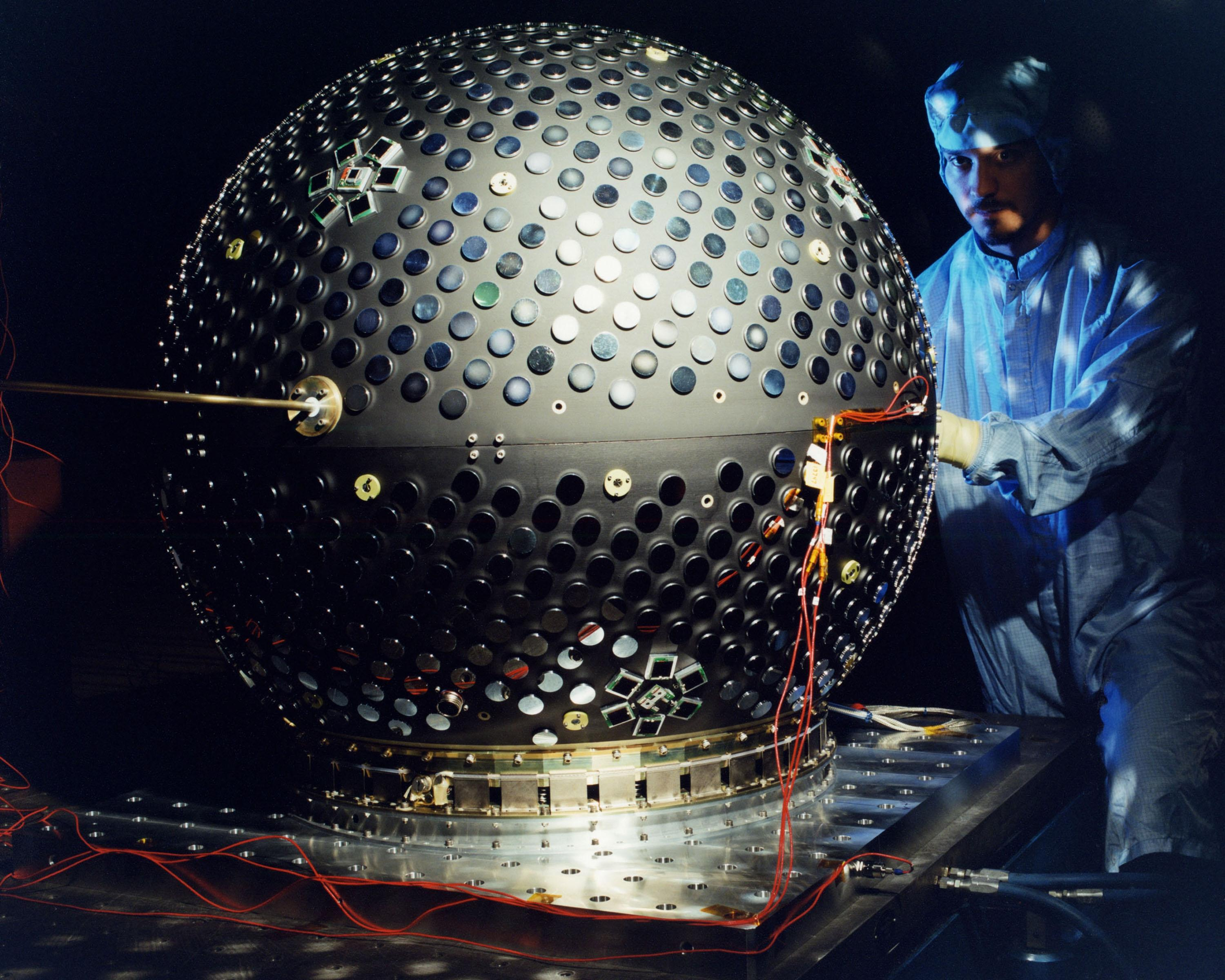
- Mission type: Communications
- Operator: NASA
- COSPAR ID: 2001-043A
- SATCAT no.: 26929
- Mission duration: 1 year and 3 months

Spacecraft properties
- Manufacturer: Naval Research Laboratory
- Launch mass: 91 kg (201 lb)
- Dimensions: 0.9 metres (2 ft 11 in)

Start of mission
- Launch date: 30 September 2001, 02:40 UTC
- Rocket: Athena 1 LM-001
- Launch site: Kodiak LP-1

End of mission
- Decay date: 21 January 2003

Orbital parameters
- Reference system: Geocentric
- Regime: Low Earth
- Eccentricity: 0.0
- Altitude: 472 km (293 mi)
- Inclination: 67°
- Period: 94 minutes
- Epoch: 30 September 2001

Transponders
- Frequency: 145.825 MHz

Starshine 3 (also called SO-43 and OSCAR 43) is one of five satellites in the Starshine project (Student Tracked Atmospheric Research Satellite for Heuristic International Equipment).

Starshine 3's main task was to study the density of the Earth's upper atmosphere. In addition, the 94 centimetres (37 in) and 91 kilograms (201 lb) heavy spherical satellite body was covered with 1,500 mirrors, which were manufactured by machine technology students in Utah and polished by almost 40,000 students in 1,000 different schools. In addition, 31 laser reflectors and a radio beacon in the amateur radio frequency range (145.825 MHz) were attached. The transmitter was powered by solar cells and batteries. Starshine 3 had neither drive nor position control.

== Mission ==
The satellite, together with the PICOSat, PCSat and SAPPHIRE satellites, was launched on September 30, 2001 with an Athena I rocket from Kodiak Launch Complex, Alaska, USA.

Because of the mirrors, the satellite was visible to the naked eye from Earth at night. Students measured the difference in the daily shortening orbital period and derived the density of the atmosphere. They also measured fluctuations in the intensity of UV radiation from the Sun, which they associated with different densities in the atmosphere.

Starshine 3 burned up on January 21, 2003 after 7,434 orbits in the Earth's atmosphere about two years earlier than originally expected.

== See also ==
- OSCAR
- STARSHINE (satellite)
