= Equatorial Vortex Experiment =

Experiment to predict electrical storms

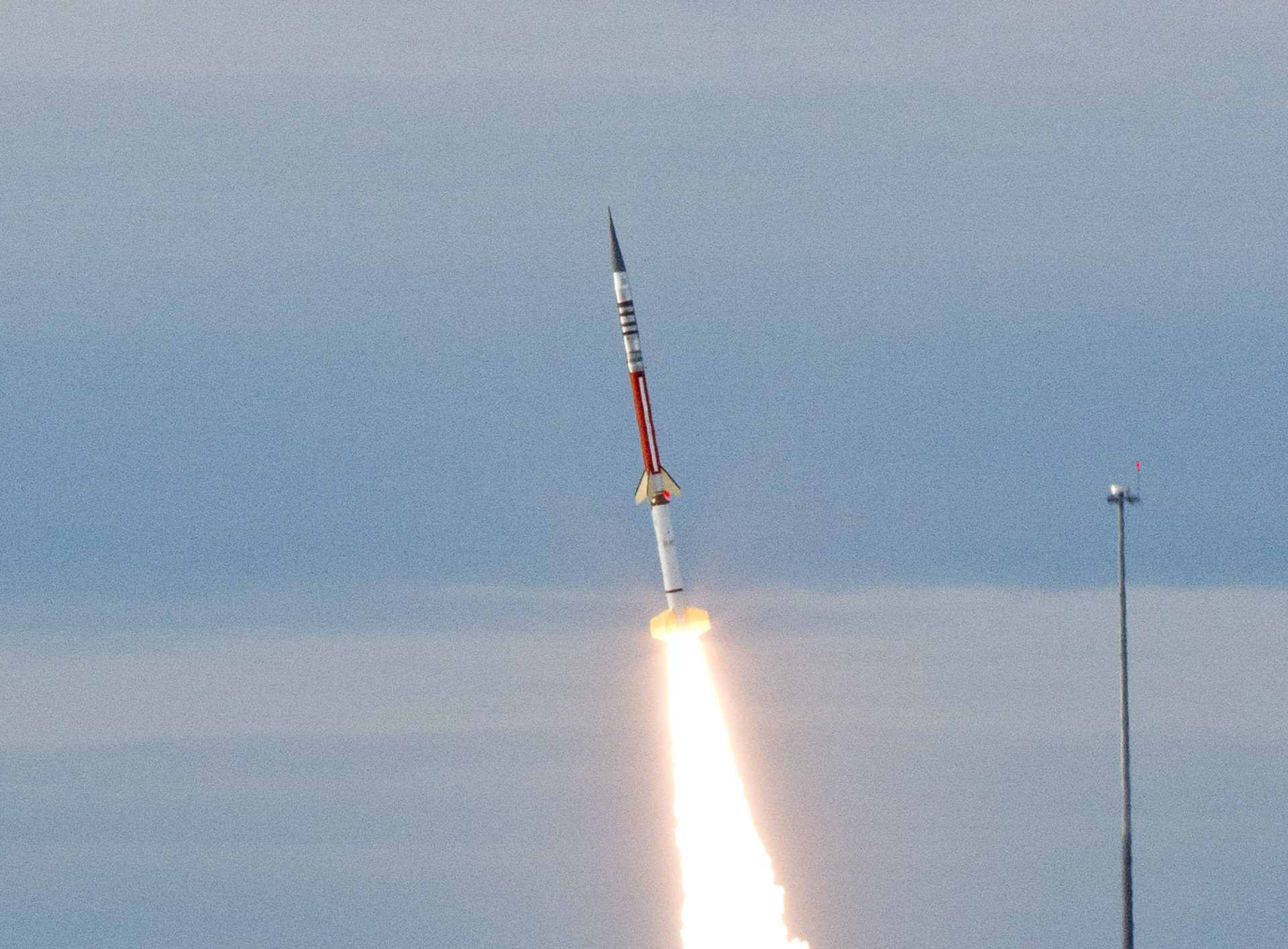
The Terrier Malemute launch vehicle

The Equatorial Vortex Experiment (EVEX) is a NASA-funded sounding rocket mission to better understand and predict the electrical storms in Earth's upper atmosphere. As part of this experiment, two rockets were launched for a twelve-minute journey through the equatorial ionosphere above the South Pacific. These rockets were launched from Kwajalein Atoll in the Marshall Islands during a period of April 27 to May 10, 2013.

The principal investigator for this mission is Erhan Kudeki of the University of Illinois. The purpose of this experiment is to study what disrupts radio waves.

A NASA Terrier Oriole sounding rocket was launched at 3:39 a.m. EDT on 7 May 2013 from Roi Namur, Republic of the Marshall Islands. Ninety seconds later a Terrier-Improved Malemute sounding rocket was also launched successfully.

This experiment will help scientists better understand and predict the electrical storms in Earth's upper atmosphere. The electrical storms can interfere with satellite communication and global positioning signals. Payload for each rocket included two canisters of samarium and a dual frequency RF Beacon (NRL CERTO).

These two rockets released vapor clouds of lithium (trimethyl aluminum), and were observed from various locations in the area. All scientific instruments on the rockets worked as planned. These two rockets were the second and third rockets of four planned for launch during 2013's campaign in the Marshall Islands.

In June 2017, a Terrier-Improved Malemute two-stage sounding rocket was launched from NASA's Wallops Flight Facility in Virginia. The artificial clouds released by this rocket helped scientists track the movement of Earth's ionosphere.
