= Bob Bruninga =

American engineer and environmental activist (1949–2022)

Robert Ervin Bruninga
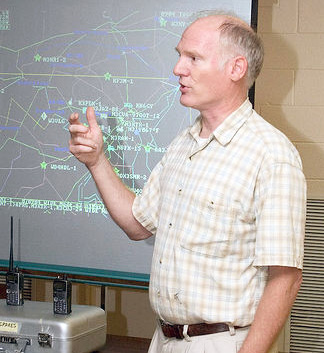
- Bob Bruninga lecturing at the Naval Academy
- Born: April 27, 1948; Birmingham, Alabama, U.S.
- Died: February 7, 2022 (aged 73); Glen Burnie, Maryland, U.S.
- Education: Georgia Institute of Technology; Naval Postgraduate School; Polytechnic Institute New York; George Washington University
- Occupations: Electrical engineer; Lecturer; Research Engineer
- Employer: U.S. Naval Academy
- Organizations: IEEE; Amateur Satellite Corporation; ARRL Foundation; APRS Standards Committee
- Known for: Development of the APRS; Alternative energy activism; Electric vehicle development
- Notable work: APRS
- Spouse: Carol Elise Albert (m.1985)
- Children: 2
- Call sign: WB4APR
- Awards: Technical Excellence Award, Dayton Hamvention 1998; YASMEE Foundation Technical Award 2010

Robert Ervin Bruninga (April 27, 1948 – February 7, 2022), better known as Bob Bruninga or by his amateur radio callsign WB4APR, was an American engineer, inventor, and activist. Bruninga's interests were diverse, but in his own view, inextricably interrelated. Audiences expecting to learn about satellite engineering or packet radio often found themselves the recipients of impassioned lectures on solar power, climate change, or electric vehicle engineering; or vice-versa. Although Bruninga was thus known to different constituencies for different innovations, he is most famous for developing the Automatic Packet Reporting System, or APRS, a globally-popular digital radio protocol used for real-time communication of formatted data. His advances in digital amateur radio communications are central to his career, and much of his other work was driven by that interest. In addition to creating APRS, Bruninga was a licensed professional engineer, a private pilot, a commander in the US Navy, launched nine satellite missions between 2001 and 2018, and was an indefatigable proponent of sustainable energy independence and electric vehicles.

== Biography ==
=== Early life ===
Bruninga was born in Birmingham, Alabama, in 1948. In 1949, his family moved to Florence, Alabama, where he grew up, building amateur radio kits and graduating from Coffee High School in 1966. He spent much of his youth in the wilds of northwest Alabama, becoming an Eagle Scout in the process, and developing a lifelong passion for protection of the natural environment.

=== Naval career ===
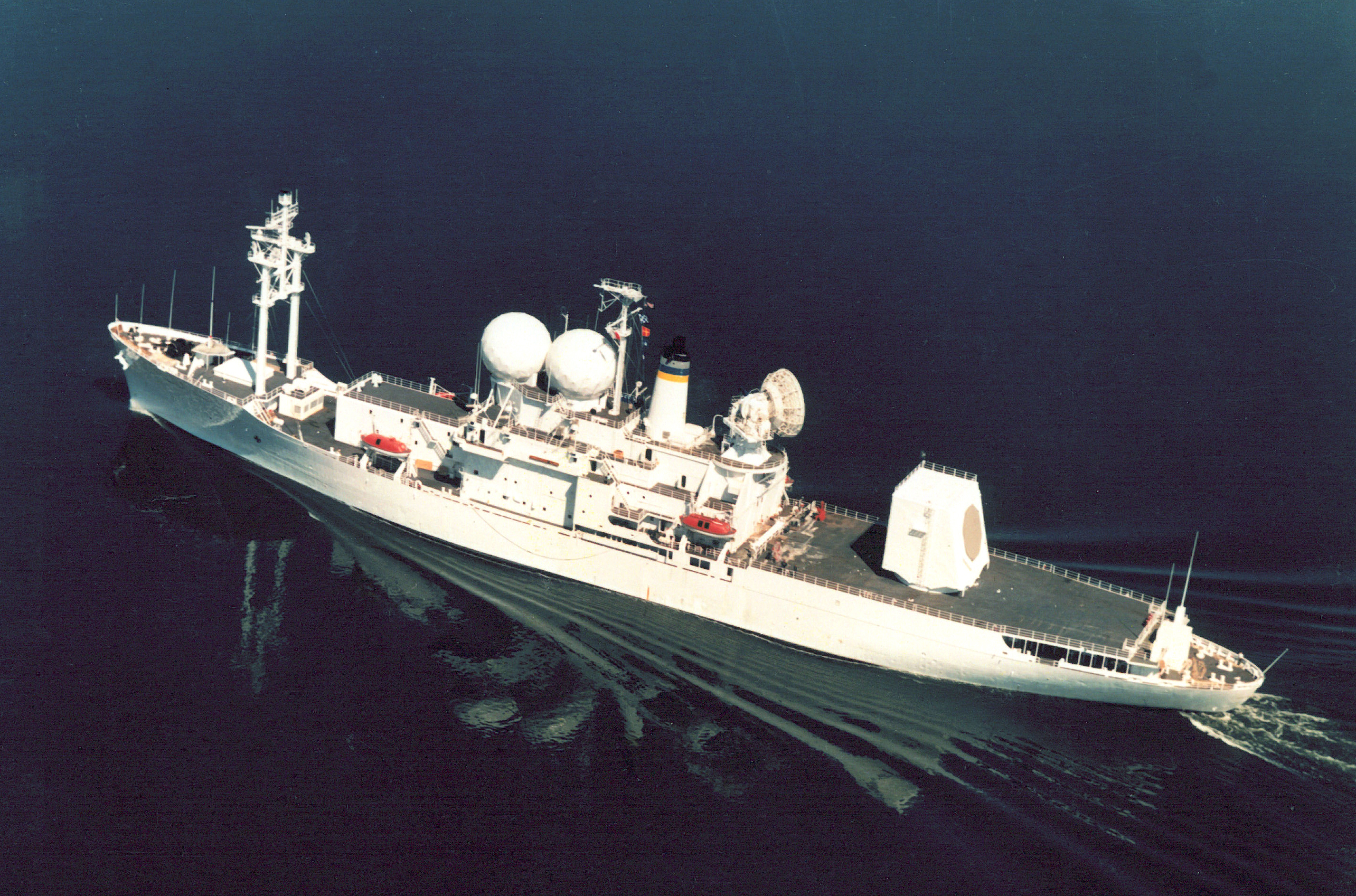
USNS Observation Island (AG-154)

A Navy ROTC scholarship paid for Bruninga's Electrical Engineering degree from Georgia Tech where in 1970, his senior project was an electric Volkswagen conversion which he entered in the first MIT/Caltech cross-country Clean Air Car Race, a six-day, 3,600-mile intercollegiate cross-country automobile rally from Cambridge, Massachusetts to Pasadena, California. Upon graduation with honors, Bruninga was commissioned as an ensign in the US Navy, and immediately proceeded to earn a master's degree in electrical engineering from the Naval Postgraduate School in Monterey, California in 1971. The next twenty years of his naval career was spent switching between practical radio engineering and academic work. In 1971-1972, he was an electronics officer on the USNS Observation Island AG-154, stationed in Pearl Harbor, working on instrumentation and telemetry related to the Navy's submarine-launched Fleet Ballistic Missile system. In the latter part of 1972 and 1973, he was stationed in Sasebo, Japan, attached as an electronics officer to the command staff of Service Group Three, which would shortly thereafter be renamed Naval Surface Group Western Pacific.

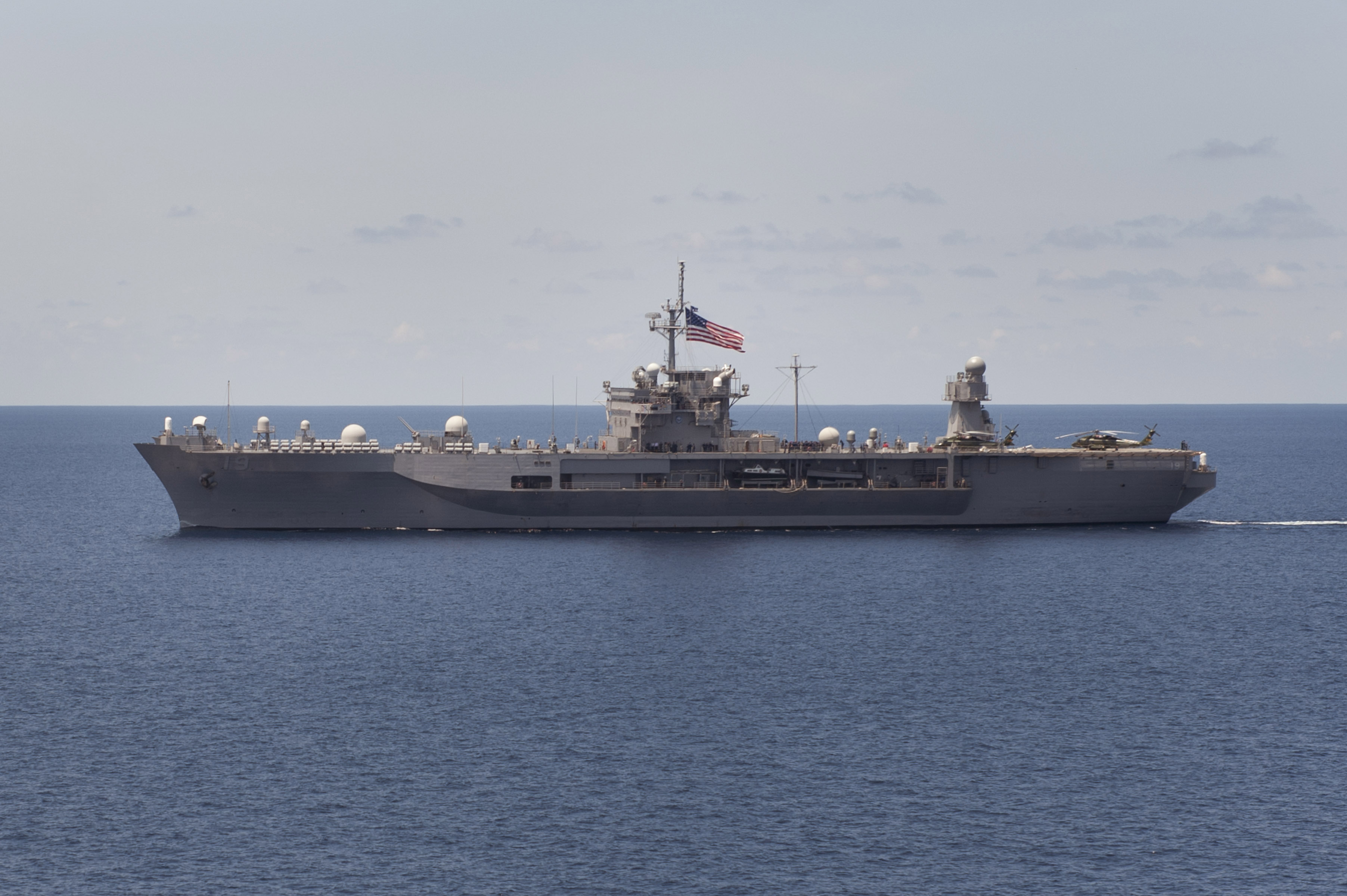
USS Blue Ridge (LCC-19)

In 1974 and 1975, he was transferred to Brooklyn, New York, with the rank of Ship Superintendent in the Office of the Assistant Secretary of the Navy, Supervisor of Ships, which allowed him to take a two-year postgraduate research position at the Polytechnic Institute New York. In 1976 and 1977, he moved to Washington, D.C., where he did further postgraduate research at George Washington University while stationed at the Defense Command Engineering Center in Reston, Virginia. Having concluded his studies, he was promoted to Program Manager at the Naval Sea Systems Command, still in the Washington D.C. area. 1980 saw a return to Yokosuka, Japan, as the electronics officer of the USS Blue Ridge (LCC-19), which had just been designated the new flagship of the Seventh Fleet. In this four-year posting, he was responsible for providing command, control, communications, computers, and intelligence (C4I) support to the commander and staff of the United States Seventh Fleet, and he enjoyed a steady series of promotions.

In 1983, he was given an academic posting as chair of the electrical engineering department in Maury Hall of the United States Naval Academy in Annapolis, Maryland. Here, he was promoted to his final rank, Commander, in 1984, and met his fellow professor Carol Elise Albert, whom he would marry the following year. In 1985, he was made program manager of the newly-formed Naval Space Command in Dahlgren, Virginia, and he remained in this position until 1988, when he took his final operational duty role as combat system inspector in the Board of Inspection and Survey. During the summers of 1985 and 1986, he also served as a faculty fellow at the NASA Goddard Space Flight Center, in Greenbelt, Maryland. Bruninga retired from active naval duty in 1990, with a brief stint building satellites at Bendix from 1990-1992, before beginning the most notable phase of his career, launching amateur digital radio satellites.

=== Marriage and children ===
Bruninga was married to Naval Academy astronomy professor Carol Elise Albert on May 4, 1985, and the couple had two children, Elizabeth Ann ("Bethann") Bruninga (WE4APR) and Andrew John ("A.J.") Bruninga (WA4APR).

=== Death ===
Bruninga revealed in December 2020 that he had been diagnosed with sarcoma two weeks after his retirement from the Navy. He died on February 7, 2022, from complications of sarcoma and the long-term effects of COVID-19.

== Philosophy and activism ==
Bruninga was a lifelong pragmatic environmentalist, advocating for and exemplarizing energy-neutral and carbon-neutral living at a personal level, and energy independence as a national defense policy. Throughout his career, he built and drove solar-powered electric vehicles, and lived in an exclusively solar-powered home. He was also brought together groups of amateur radio enthusiasts on many projects and recurring events, such as Appalachian Trail Golden Packet. A radio relay from Georgia to Maine which has occurred on the third Saturday of each July since 2009.

"Bruninga's the king of expedient engineering. He gets stuff done. Maybe not always well, but well enough, and on a shoestring. He's conned the Navy into paying for at least two ham satellites. We've had some ideological differences. A decade ago we got into it on the APRSSIG and (mostly just between the two of us) turned a 3-5 message per day mailing list into a 50-100 message per day epic flame war for an entire week. We've also hung out at the bar at DCC drinking beers. We don't always agree on how to get there, but we're working for the same things."

— Scott Miller N1VG, 2016

Commenting on the 2015 proposed rollback of Maryland state greenhouse gas reduction legislation in his roles on the IEEE National Committee on Transportation and Aerospace and the Maryland EV Infrastructure Council, Bob summarized his engineer's outlook on sustainability and environmentalism:

"Maryland sits in one of the most populated regions in the country and we have to breathe the air we are polluting and burning up every day. We can do this! At my house, we have reduced our fossil fuel consumption by 90% by going solar on the house, by using a ground source heat pump, and by commuting in an electric vehicle. And it costs us LESS than just continuing with the status quo! It is easy, and it costs less in the long run. Stop putting off the fixes. Move forward on greenhouse gas reduction!"

== Amateur Radio Research and Development Corporation ==
Bruninga served as the Technical Director of the Amateur Radio Research and Development Corporation (AMRAD), an amateur packet radio association based in McLean, Virginia, from 1975 until his death. He served on the ARRDC's board of directors from 1976-1986, and as its vice president from 1978-1983. He likened AMRAD's Washington, D.C.-area voice repeater to a 1970's-era social network:

"The roots of the Automatic Packet Reporting System (APRS) go back to the late 1970s as the AMRAD (Amateur Radio Research and Development) Group was excitedly beginning to experiment with AX.25 packet radio. This was before the Internet and as we spent our free time in our shacks, we were all socially networked by the AMRAD voice repeater. All evening and weekends, someone was working on something or developing something new and sharing the excitement with the others. We hung onto our handy transceivers everywhere we went like kids these days hang onto their iPads and smartphones to keep up with the excitement."

Prior to the existence of the GPS system, AMRAD provided communications support for the annual Old Dominion 100 mile endurance run, using packet radio at each checkpoint to beacon digital data objects about arrivals to the next checkpoint along the route, the earliest incarnation of APRS.

== Satellite and International Space Station missions ==
Bridging his role as an instructor of engineering students at the Naval Academy and his advocacy for amateur radio, Bruninga launched nine satellite missions between 2001 and 2018, including three experiments conducted on the International Space Station:

=== PCSAT1 (30 September 2001) ===
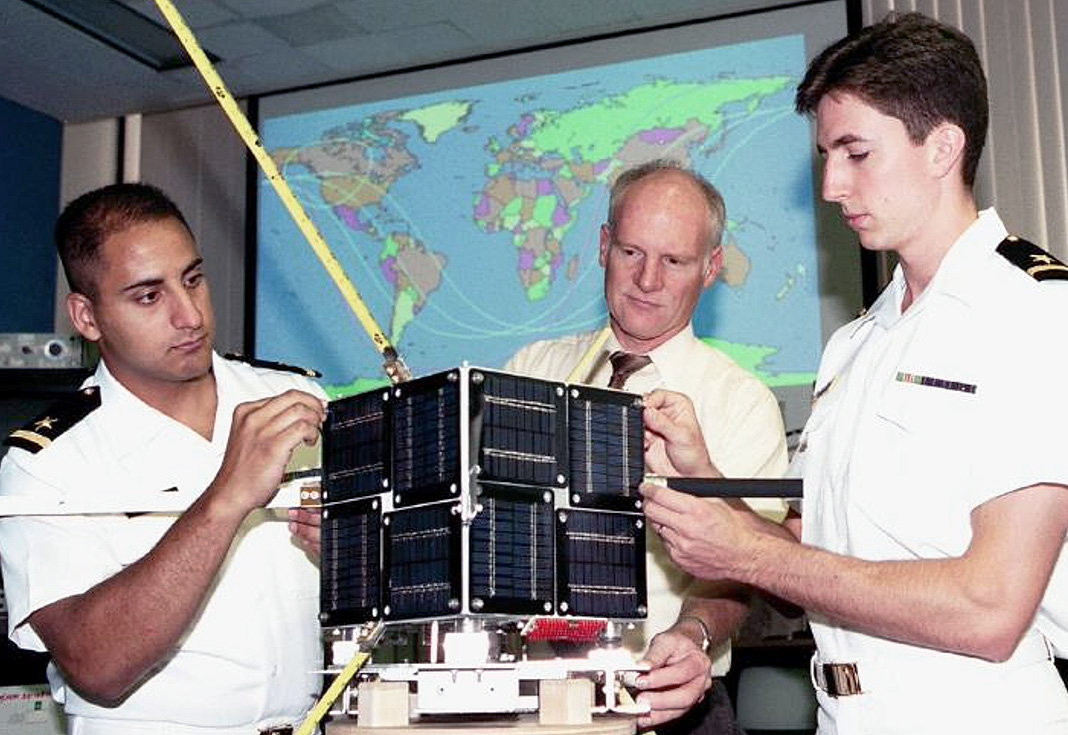
Bob Bruninga WB4APR (center) with USNA-1 / PCSat, September 2001

Prototype Communications SATellite 1 (PCsat-1) or OSCAR 44 is a solar-powered digital repeater for APRS in the 2-meter band. It has a negative power balance, operating and charging its batteries each time it enters sunlight, and remaining active for about 45 minutes each time it enters the earth's shadow.

=== PCSAT2 (3 August 2005) ===
PCSAT2 was installed by astronaut Soichi Noguchi on the outside of the International Space Station on 3 August 2005 during EVA3. PCSAT2 was recovered from the outside of the ISS on the 3rd EVA of mission STS-115 on 15 September 2006 and was the first amateur radio satellite to return to earth intact.

=== RAFT and MARScom (21 December 2006) ===
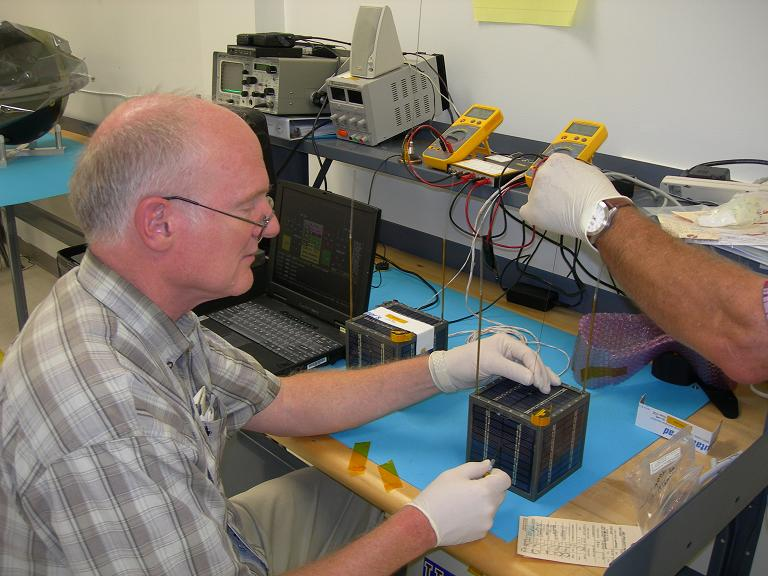
Bob Bruninga WB4APR constructing OSCAR 60 / RAFT 1, July 2005

RAFT (OSCAR 60) and MARScom, were a pair of 5-inch, 3.5kg cubesats, containing both active radar transponders and passive reflectors. They were designed as a test of the Navy Space Surveillance System and a training exercise for United States Naval Academy electrical engineering students. RAFT contained a 217 MHz transponder for the Navy Space Surveillance System, while MARScom contained 1200bps transponders for the Amateur Satellite Service, the Navy Military Affiliate Radio System, and the Naval Academy's Yard Patrol Craft.

=== ANDE (21 December 2006) ===
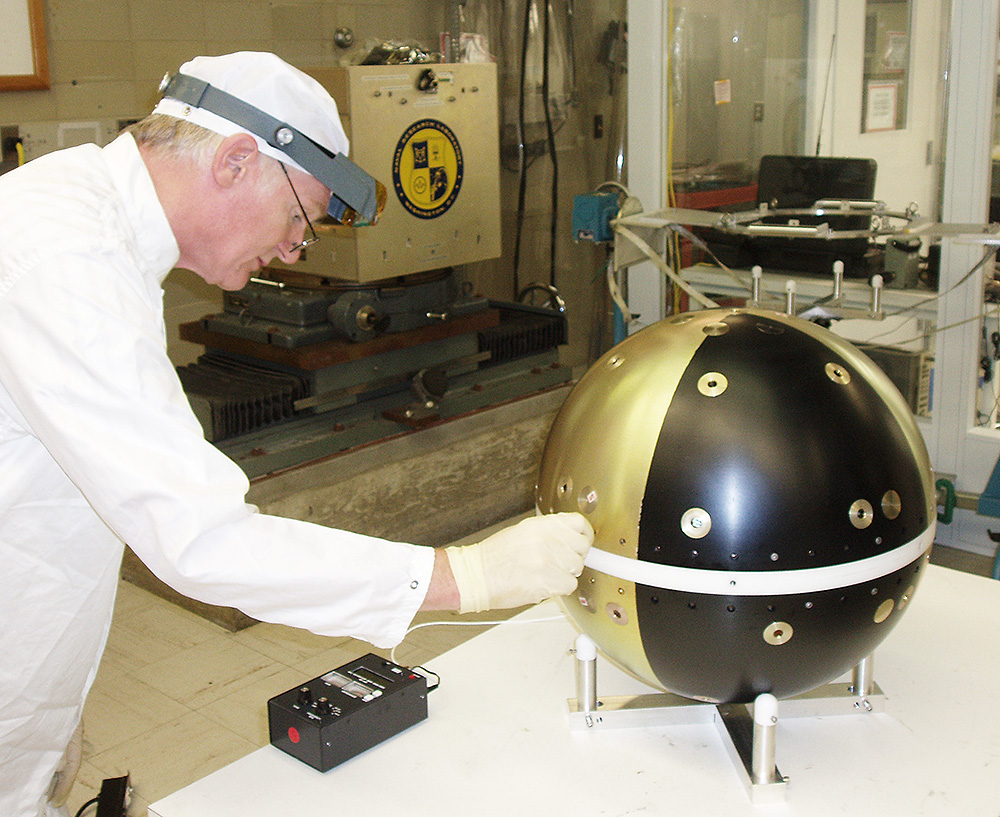
Bruninga with the ANDE amateur radio transponder satellite, 18 August 2005

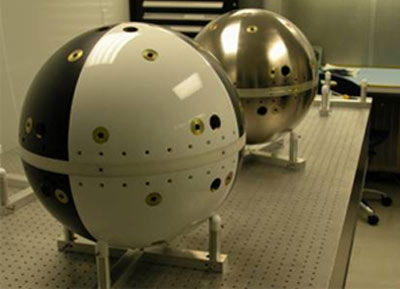
Photograph of the OSCAR 61 and OSCAR 62 ANDE and FCAL satellites

The Mock ANDE Active (MAA) and Radar Fence Calibration (FCal), also dubbed OSCAR 61 and 62 microsatellites, were launched from the Shuttle payload bay on the STS-116 mission to measure the density and composition of the low Earth orbit (LEO) atmosphere and better predict the movement of objects in orbit. The orbital decay of the satellites was tracked by the MAUI Laser Ranging Tracking Station, and ham radio volunteer ground stations provided telemetry feeds, including temperature and battery life. The satellites were both 50cm diameter spheres, but were constructed of different materials and had different masses, 50kg (OSCAR 61) and 75kg (OSCAR 62) respectively. Observing the positions of the two satellites allowed the measurement of differences in orbital decay associated with geomagnetic activity.

=== ANDE-2 (2009) ===
Like the previous RAFT and ANDE experiments, ANDE-2 used pair of similar 50cm spherical aluminum satellites with differing weights, 50kg and 25kg, to measure the density and composition of the earth's atmosphere in the low earth orbit (LEO) altitudes, so as to more accurately predict the drag coefficients of future satellites. The active satellite was named Castor, while the passive one was named Pollux. Like their predecessors, they were marked in alternating black anodized and white painted quadrants, to allow observers to measure rate of rotation.

=== PSAT (20 May 2015) ===
PSAT was a successor to the original PCSAT as a repeater in the APRS packet radio satellite network. It operated a 1200bps frequency-modulated APRS digital repeater on 145.825 MHz, and a PSK31 repeater receiving on 28.120 MHz and retransmitting on 435.350 MHz. It operated for more than six years, with its last transmission on 22 December 2021 at 14:40 UTC.

=== QIKCOM-1 (27 October 2017) ===
The QIKCOM-1 satellite was another APRS repeater, built on short notice by Bruninga's US Naval Academy students in a single semester to take advantage of the 6 December 2015 launch of the NovaWurks HiSAT SIMPL/Kaber launch. Operational deployment was delayed by more than a year however, due to concerns raised by the Federal Communications Commission that its amateur status was invalid, since it was built by students at a federal government institution. This was eventually reconciled with a new temporary operating license.

=== QIKCOM-2 (not launched) ===
The QIKCOM-2 satellite was built, but delayed three times and ultimately not launched, due to the same FCC licensing difficulties that delayed QIKCOM-1, wherein the FCC blocked its use of amateur frequencies because of the federal government association of the US Naval Academy students who built it, requiring that the host launch project also receive NTIA approval, an additional hurdle which host spacecraft operators found untenable. QIKCOM-2 would have been the first APRS satellite to provide DTMF ("Touch Tone") signaling.

=== PSAT-2 (25 June 2019) ===
PSAT-2, the successor to the 2015 PSAT, launched on a SpaceX Falcon Heavy on June 25, 2019. Like its predecessors, it is an APRS repeater, operating on 145.825 MHz, and supports the DTMF signaling that would have been supported by QIKCOM-2, had it made it into space. It is also the first to support text-to-speech synthesis and voice uplink and downlink. Bruninga states that FCC approval for the amateur status of PSAT-2 took three years to complete.

== Electric vehicles ==
Bruninga was an indefatigable advocate for the replacement of gasoline vehicles with solar-powered electric vehicles as a means of environmental protection and energy self-sufficiency. He evangelized tirelessly, with an engineer's passion for practical solutions, and was infamous for "bait and switch" lectures which drew in audiences expecting to hear about amateur radio, or satellite communications, but pivoted halfway-through to equally fascinating discourse on electrification and the environment. Bruninga was an advocate of "good enough" solutions which could be widely and immediately deployed at low cost, particularly level-1 (low-amperage) charging of EVs from already-existing electrical outlets in places where they already park, rather than driving them to purpose-built level-2 and level-3 charging stations. From his first "Elect-Reck" Volkswagen-based electric vehicle in 1970, to the end of his life, Bob's electric cars and boats were built to serve the dual purposes of his own transportation, and as existence-proofs, teaching aids in his quest to educate the public.

== Published works ==
- Bruninga, Bob; Thienel, Julie; Stevens, Robert; Ridge, Cory; Healy, Chad (11 August 2009). "The Magnetic Attitude Control System for the Parkinson Satellite (PSAT) A US Naval Academy Designed CubeSat". AIAA Guidance, Navigation, and Control Conference. Reston, Virigina: American Institute of Aeronautics and Astronautics. doi:10.2514/6.2009-5947. ISBN 978-1-60086-978-5.
- Bruninga, Bob; Kang, Jin S.; Lim, Tae W. (9 January 2015). "U.S. Naval Academy Small Satellite Program: Leveraging Small Satellites for Engineering Education and Research". 53rd AIAA Aerospace Sciences Meeting. Reston, Virginia: American Institute of Aeronautics and Astronautics. doi:10.2514/6.2015-2087. ISBN 978-1-62410-343-8.
- Bruninga, Bob (1 December 2017). Enjoying APRS (PDF). JVC Kenwood. pp. 8–21.
- Bruninga, Bob; Blanchard, Charles; Granshaw, Frank (12 May 2018). Energy Choices: Opportunities to Make Wise Decisions for a Sustainable Future. Quaker Institute for the Future. ISBN 9789768142993.
- Bruninga, Bob (February 2019). Energy Choices for the Radio Amateur: Your Power Sources in the 21st Century. The American Radio Relay League, Inc. ISBN 978-1-62595-103-8.

== Recognition ==
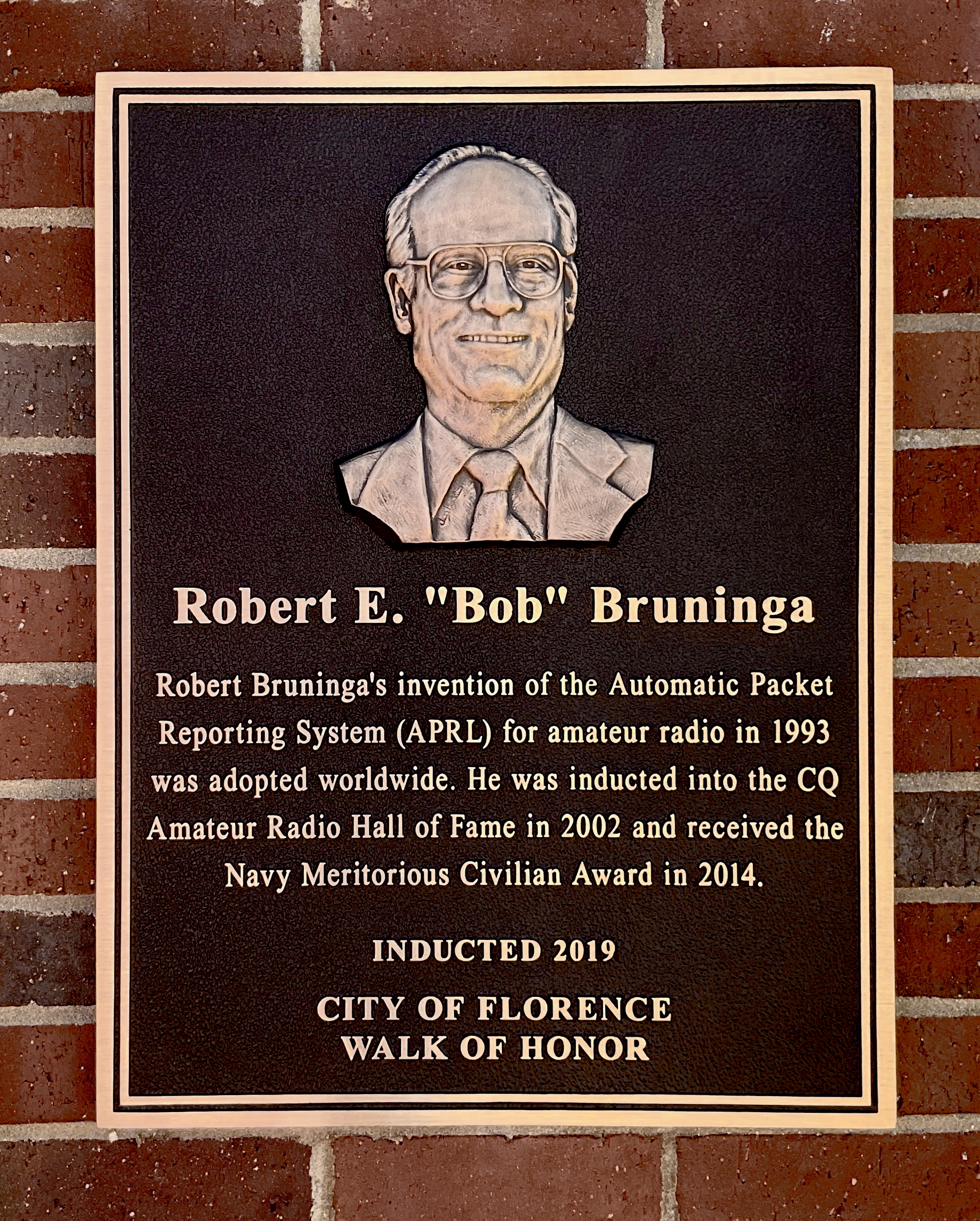
Photo of the plaque honoring Bob Bruninga in Florence, Alabama.

In 1998, Bob received the Dayton Hamvention's Technical Excellence Award for his work on APRS, and in 2019, the City of Florence, Alabama inducted Bruninga into their memorial Walk of Honor.

== See also ==
- Amateur radio satellite
- Atmospheric Neutral Density Experiment
- PCSat
- Radar Fence Transponder
- Small satellite
- Small Satellite Program (United States Naval Academy)
- Space Shuttle mission STS-116
