= OSCAR 44 =

American amateur radio satellite

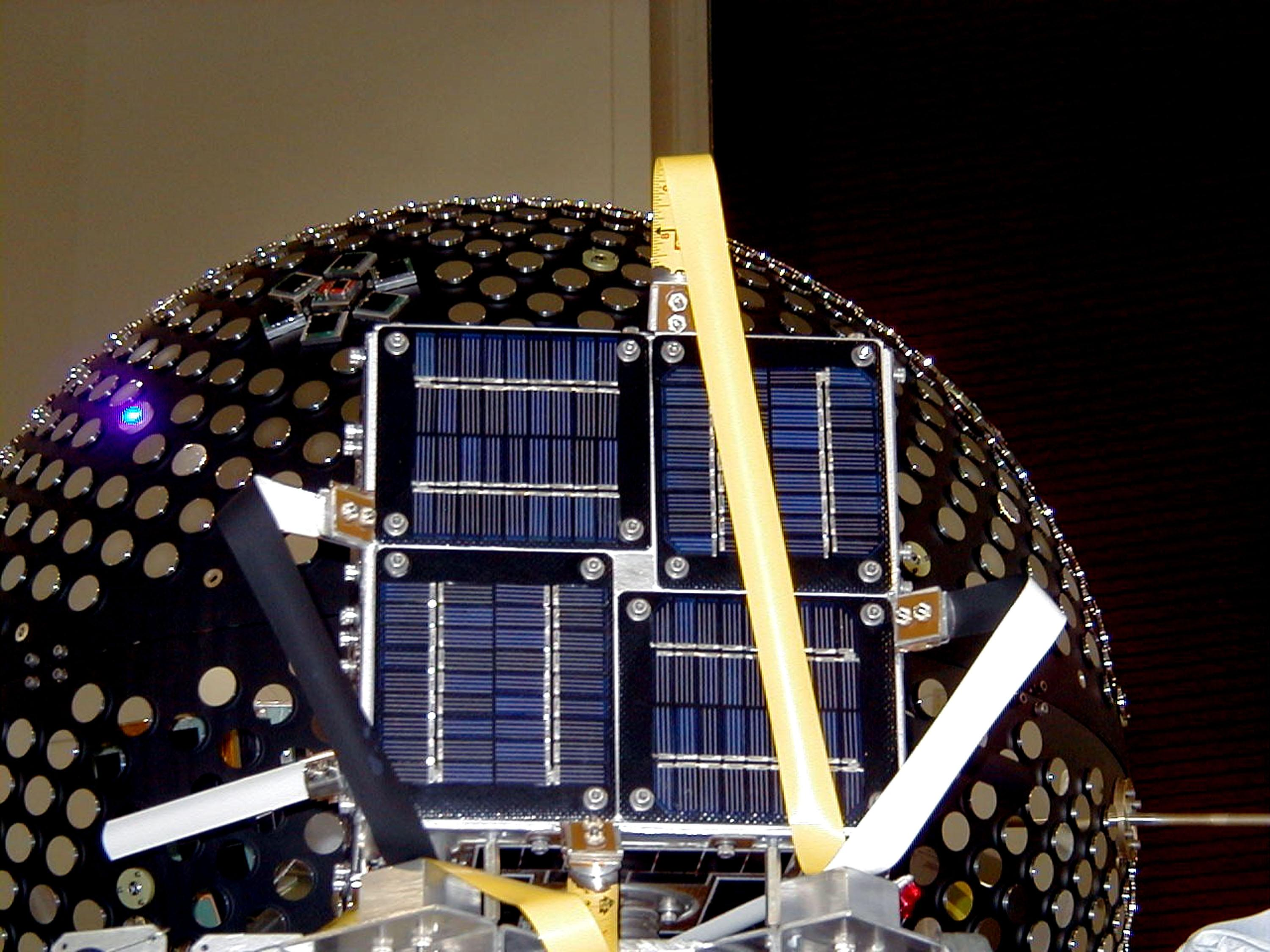
- PCSat-1 satellite.
- Mission type: Communications
- Operator: USNA
- COSPAR ID: 2001-043C
- SATCAT no.: 26931
- Website: PCSat
- Mission duration: 23 years, 9 months, 13 days (in orbit)

Spacecraft properties
- Launch mass: 10 kg (22 lb)

Start of mission
- Launch date: 30 September 2001, 02:40 UTC
- Rocket: Athena 1 LM-001
- Launch site: Kodiak LP-1

Orbital parameters
- Reference system: Geocentric
- Regime: Low Earth
- Semi-major axis: 7,167.0 km (4,453.4 mi)
- Perigee altitude: 792.3 km (492.3 mi)
- Apogee altitude: 801.7 km (498.2 mi)
- Inclination: 67.0511°
- Period: 100.7 minutes
- Epoch: 13 February 2020

Transponders
- Band: FM
- Frequency: Downlink: 145.825 MHz; Uplink: 145.825 MHz

OSCAR 44 (also called Navy-OSCAR 44, PCSat-1, Prototype Communications SATellite and NO-44) is an American amateur radio satellite for packet radio. It was built by Bob Bruninga at the U.S. Naval Academy.

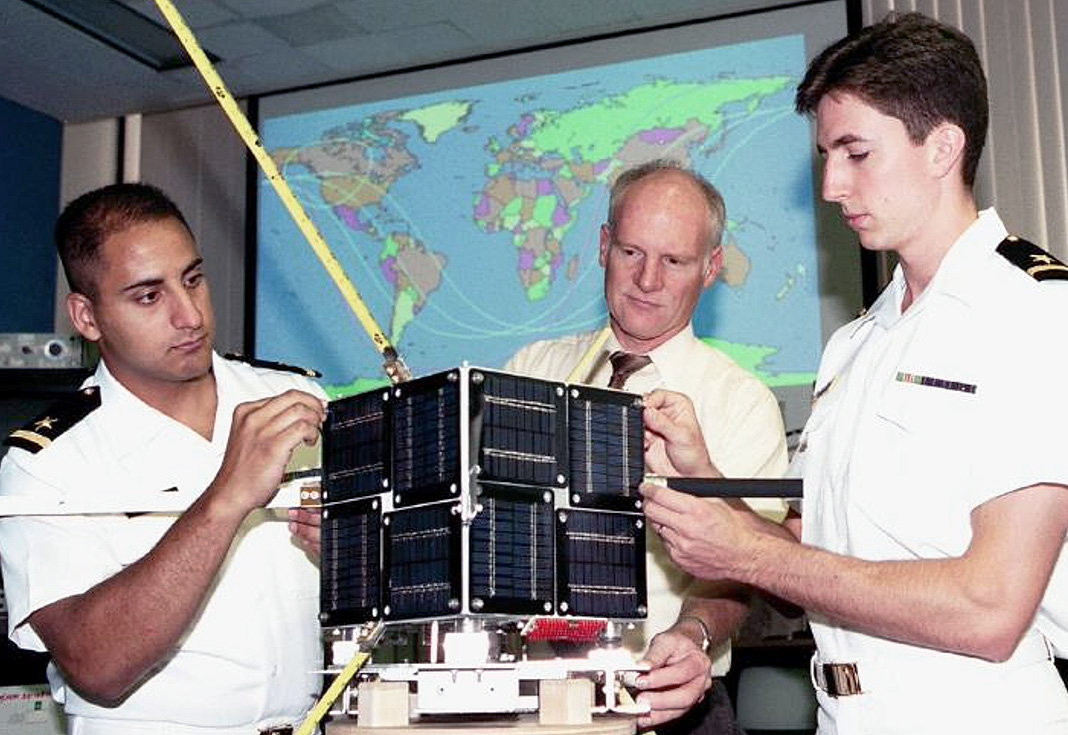
Bob Bruninga WB4APR (center) with USNA-1 / PCSat, September 2001

The satellite was launched on September 30, 2001 by the Kodiak Launch Complex, Alaska, using an Athena 1 rocket along with the Starshine 3, PICOSat and SAPPHIRE satellites. After the successful launch, the satellite was assigned OSCAR number 44.

The satellite has a digipeater for APRS in the 2-meter band. OSCAR 44 usually works with a negative power balance, which means that it is supplied with voltage by the photovoltaic cells each time it enters sunlight and remains active for another 45 minutes when it leaves sunlight using the battery charged by the photovoltaic cells.

== See also ==
- OSCAR
