= Athena II =

American small space launch rocket

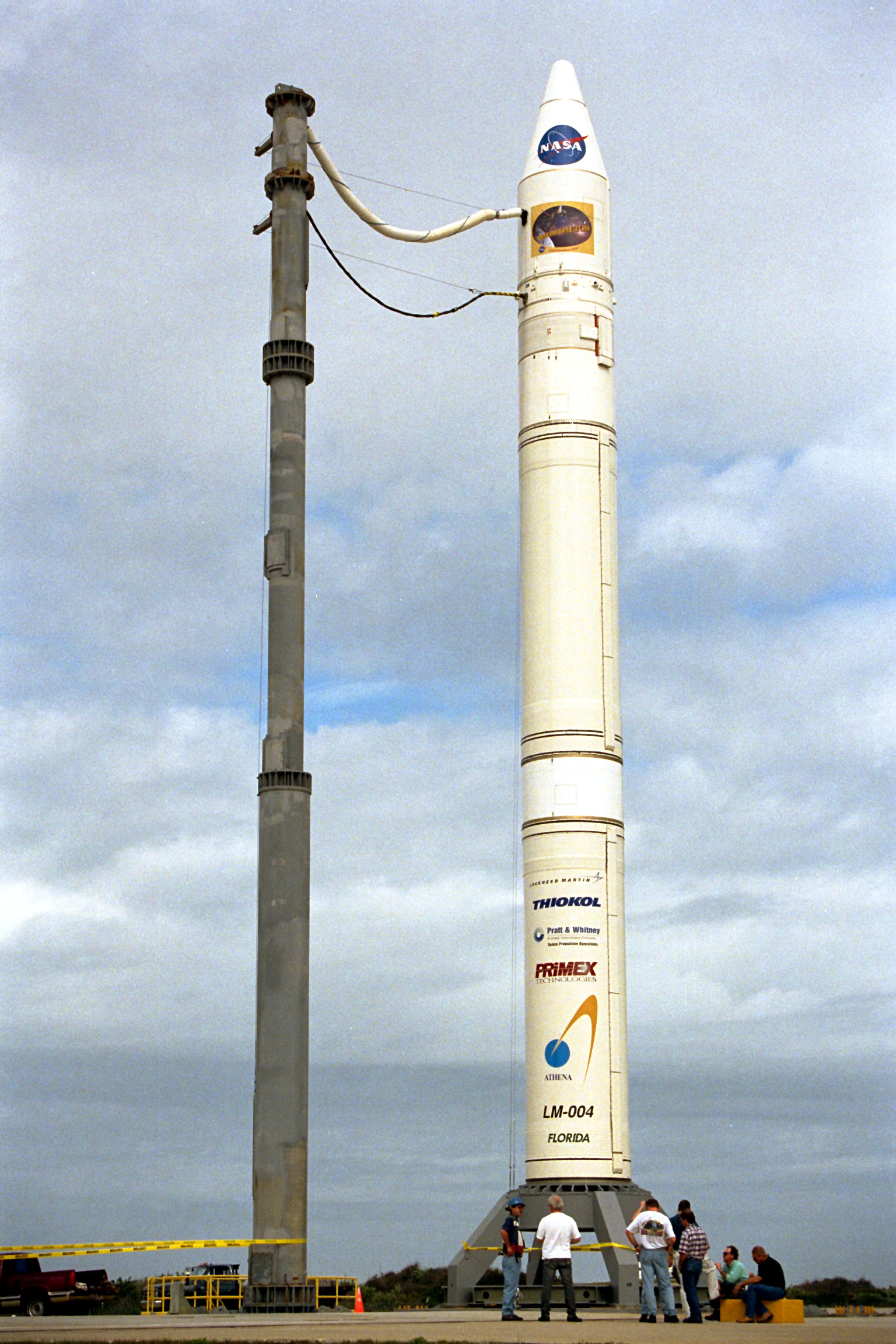
- Athena II at LC-46 with Lunar Prospector
- Function: Small expendable launch system
- Manufacturer: Lockheed Martin; Alliant Techsystems
- Country of origin: United States

Size
- Height: 28.2 metres (93 ft)
- Diameter: 2.36 metres (7 ft 9 in)
- Mass: 120,700 kilograms (266,100 lb)
- Stages: Four

Capacity

Payload to LEO
- Mass: 2,065 kilograms (4,553 lb)

Payload to SSO
- Mass: 1,165 kilograms (2,568 lb)

Payload to GTO
- Mass: 593 kilograms (1,307 lb)

Associated rockets
- Family: Athena
- Based on: LGM-118 Peacekeeper
- Comparable: Falcon 1 Minotaur IV; Taurus

Launch history
- Status: Retired
- Launch sites: Cape Canaveral LC-46; Vandenberg AFB SLC-6
- Total launches: 3
- Success(es): 2
- Failure: 1
- First flight: 7 January 1998
- Last flight: 24 September 1999

First stage – Castor 120
- Powered by: 1 solid
- Maximum thrust: 1,900 kilonewtons (430,000 lb_{f})
- Specific impulse: 280 sec
- Burn time: 83 seconds
- Propellant: HTPB/AP

Second stage – Castor 120
- Powered by: 1 solid
- Maximum thrust: 1,900 kilonewtons (430,000 lb_{f})
- Specific impulse: 280 sec
- Burn time: 83 seconds
- Propellant: HTPB/AP

Third stage – Orbus 21D
- Powered by: 1 solid
- Maximum thrust: 189.2 kilonewtons (42,500 lb_{f})
- Specific impulse: 293 sec
- Burn time: 150 seconds
- Propellant: HTPB/AP

Fourth stage – OAM
- Powered by: 4 MR-107
- Maximum thrust: 882 newtons (198 lb_{f})
- Specific impulse: 222 sec
- Burn time: 1,500 seconds
- Propellant: Hydrazine

The Athena II is an American small expendable launch system which was used for three launches between 1998 and 1999, and which was scheduled to return to service in 2012 but has not been flown again as of 2024. It is a member of the Athena family of rockets, along with the smaller Athena I.

The Athena II is a four-stage rocket, consisting of solid first, second and third stages, and a monopropellant liquid-fueled fourth stage. The first and second stages are Castor 120s, which are also used on some versions of the Taurus rocket. An Orbus 21D motor was used as the third stage on launches during the 1990s. A planned second generation Athena II launch vehicle will use a Castor 30 third stage which is under currently under development for the Taurus II. The fourth stage is an Orbital Adjustment Module, fueled by hydrazine and propelled by four MR-107 engines, which is used for final insertion.

Prior to its retirement in 1999, Athena II launches were made from Launch Complex 46 at Spaceport Florida and Space Launch Complex 6 at Vandenberg Air Force Base. LC-46 will also be used for Athena IIc launches, with Launch Pad 0B of the Mid-Atlantic Regional Spaceport and Pad 1 of the Kodiak Launch Complex also offered.

During the 1990s, three Athena II launches were conducted, with one failure. Its maiden flight was conducted from LC-46 at Spaceport Florida, and lifted off at 02:28 GMT on 7 January 1997. The launch, which was the first to take place from Spaceport Florida, successfully placed the Lunar Prospector spacecraft into orbit for NASA. The next Athena II launch took place from SLC-6 at Vandenberg on 27 April 1999, with the Ikonos satellite for Space Imaging. The launch ended in failure after the payload fairing failed to separate, and as a result the rocket had too much mass to achieve orbital velocity. The third launch also took place from SLC-6 at Vandenberg, on 24 September 1999. The payload, Ikonos 1, was also for Space Imaging, and successfully reached orbit.

== See also ==
- ALV X-1
- Comparison of small lift launch systems
- Comparison of solid-fuelled orbital launch systems
- Taurus II
