= STARSHINE (satellite) =

Series of satellites

The STARSHINE (Student Tracked Atmospheric Research Satellite Heuristic International Networking Experiment) series of three (later, a fourth one was also launched) artificial satellites were student participatory missions sponsored by the United States Naval Research Laboratory (the fourth STARSHINE was a NASA mission).

== Satellites ==
The STARSHINE launches were considered launches of opportunity.

=== STARSHINE 1 ===
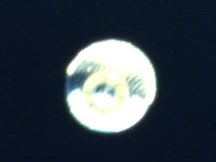
Distant view of STARSHINE 1 deployed by STS-96

STARSHINE 1 was a spherical satellite that was fitted with almost nine hundred small mirrors polished by students from around the world. It was launched June 5, 1999 from the Space Shuttle Discovery on STS-96.

Once launched, a network of over 20,000 students from eighteen countries tracked the satellite by observing sunlight glinting off the mirrors and networked their observations via the Internet. The students used these observations to calculate air drag, solar activity, and other orbit related properties of the satellite.

STARSHINE 1 re-entered and burned up in the Earth's upper atmosphere on February 18, 2000.

=== STARSHINE 2 ===
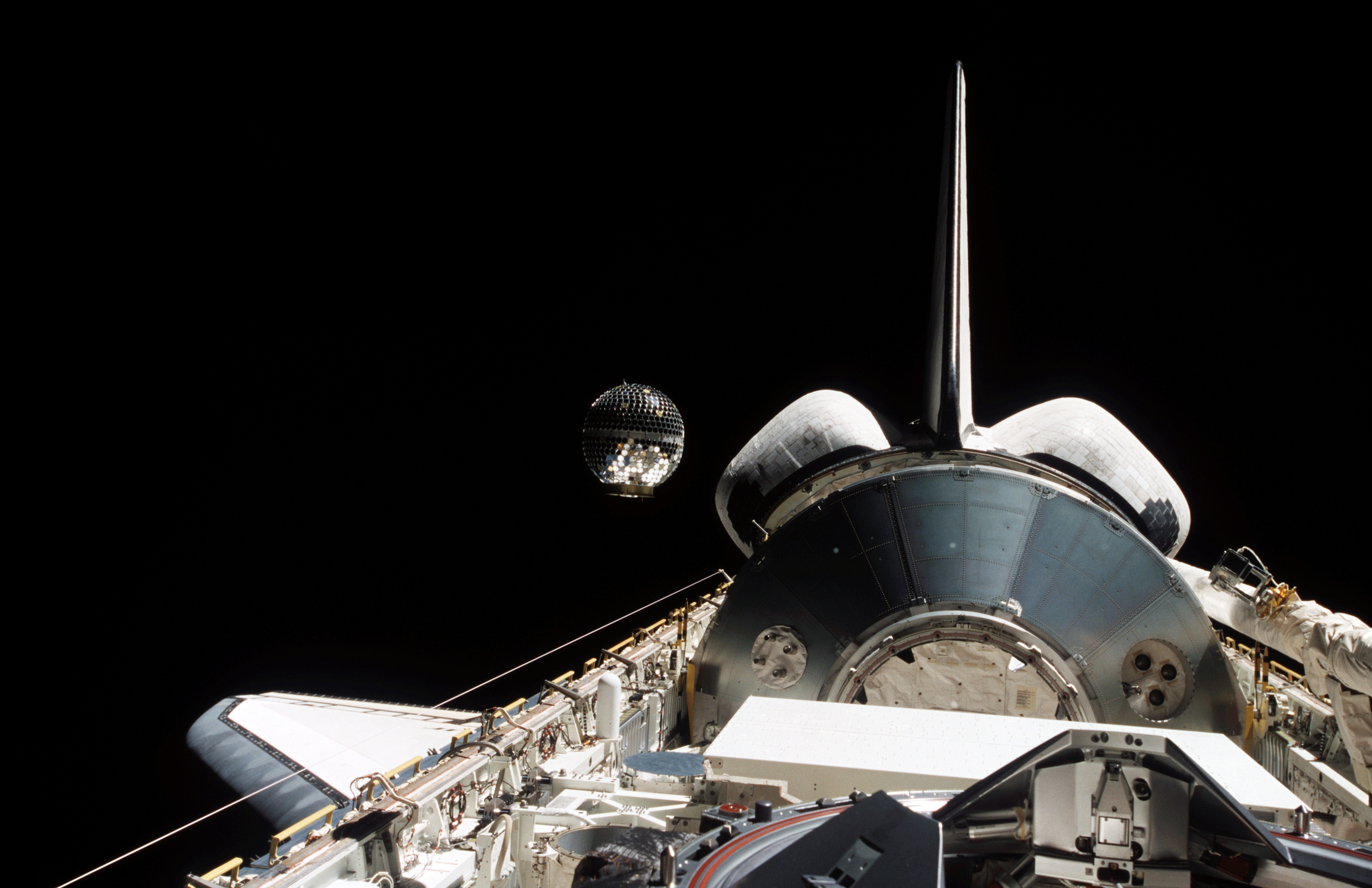
STARSHINE 2 deployed by STS-108

STARSHINE 2 and 3 had systems added to impart spin to these satellites in an effort to improve the solar-reflected flash rate, as well as a number of laser retroreflectors to introduce the students to satellite laser ranging. The satellites were constructed largely from spare flight hardware.

STARSHINE 2 launched December 5, 2001 from the Space Shuttle Endeavour on STS-108. It re-entered and burned up in the Earth's upper atmosphere on April 26, 2002.

=== STARSHINE 3 ===
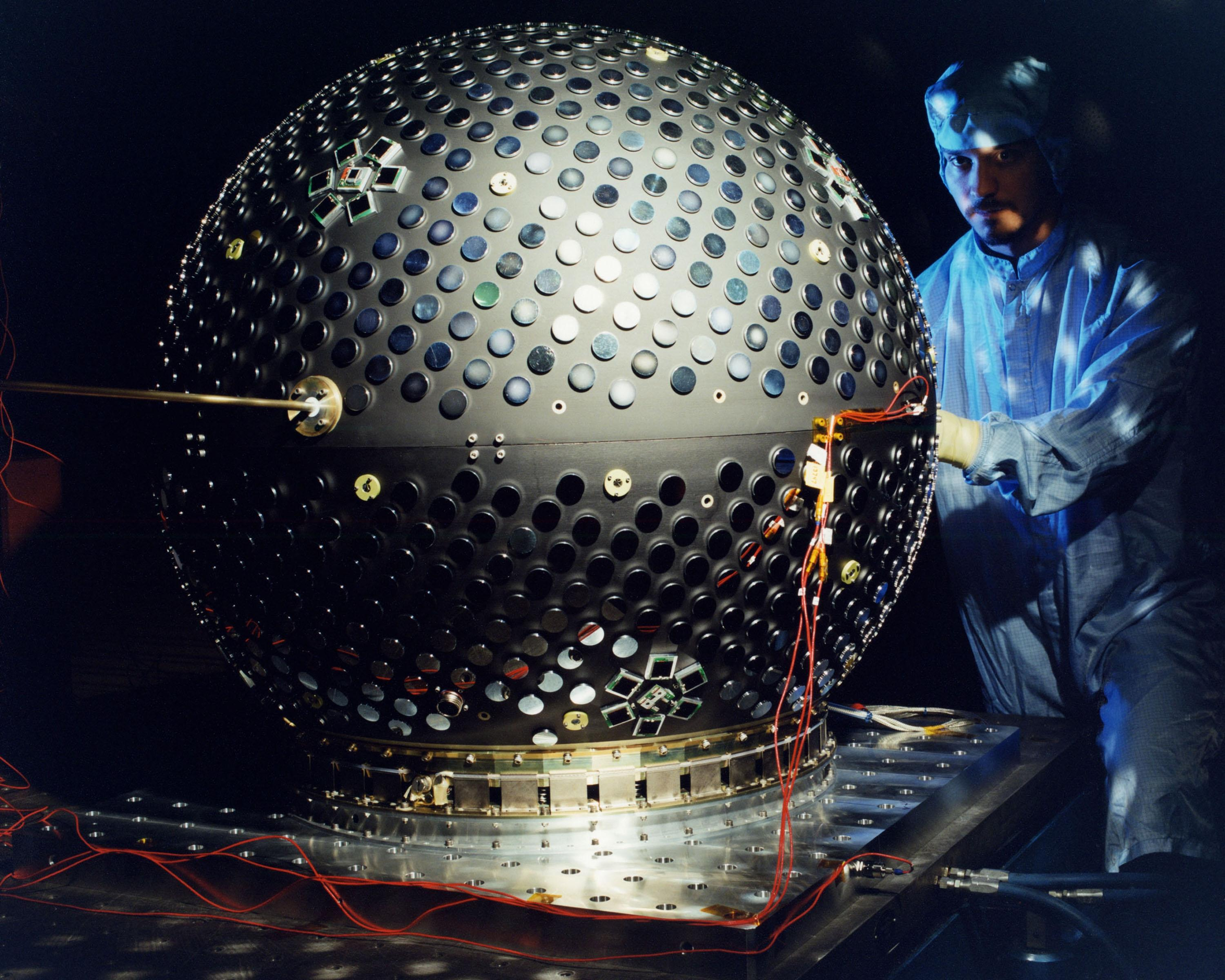
Technician working on STARSHINE 3

STARSHINE 3 has the same systems as role as STARSHINE-2. It was launched on September 29, 2001 as part of the Kodiak Star Athena I mission.

In November 2001, the amateur radio payload on Starshine 3 was designated STARSHINE-OSCAR-43, or SO-43. STARSHINE-3 re-entered and burned up in the Earth's upper atmosphere on January 21, 2003. It had made 7434 revolutions around the Earth since its launch.

=== STARSHINE 4 ===
A further fourth satellite, STARSHINE 4, was launched aboard the maiden flight of Virgin Orbit's LauncherOne rocket on 25 May 2020. The launch vehicle failed five seconds after deployment from the carrier aircraft and the satellite did not reach orbit.

== See also ==
- LAGEOS (Laser Geodynamics Satellites)—a series of scientific research satellites designed to provide an orbiting laser ranging benchmark for geodynamical studies of the Earth
- Etalon (satellite)
- Satellite laser ranging

== External sources ==
- Starshine project website
- Space Sciences: The Navy & Satellites - Starshine 2
- Space Sciences: The Navy & Satellites - Starshine 3
