= DRAGONSat =

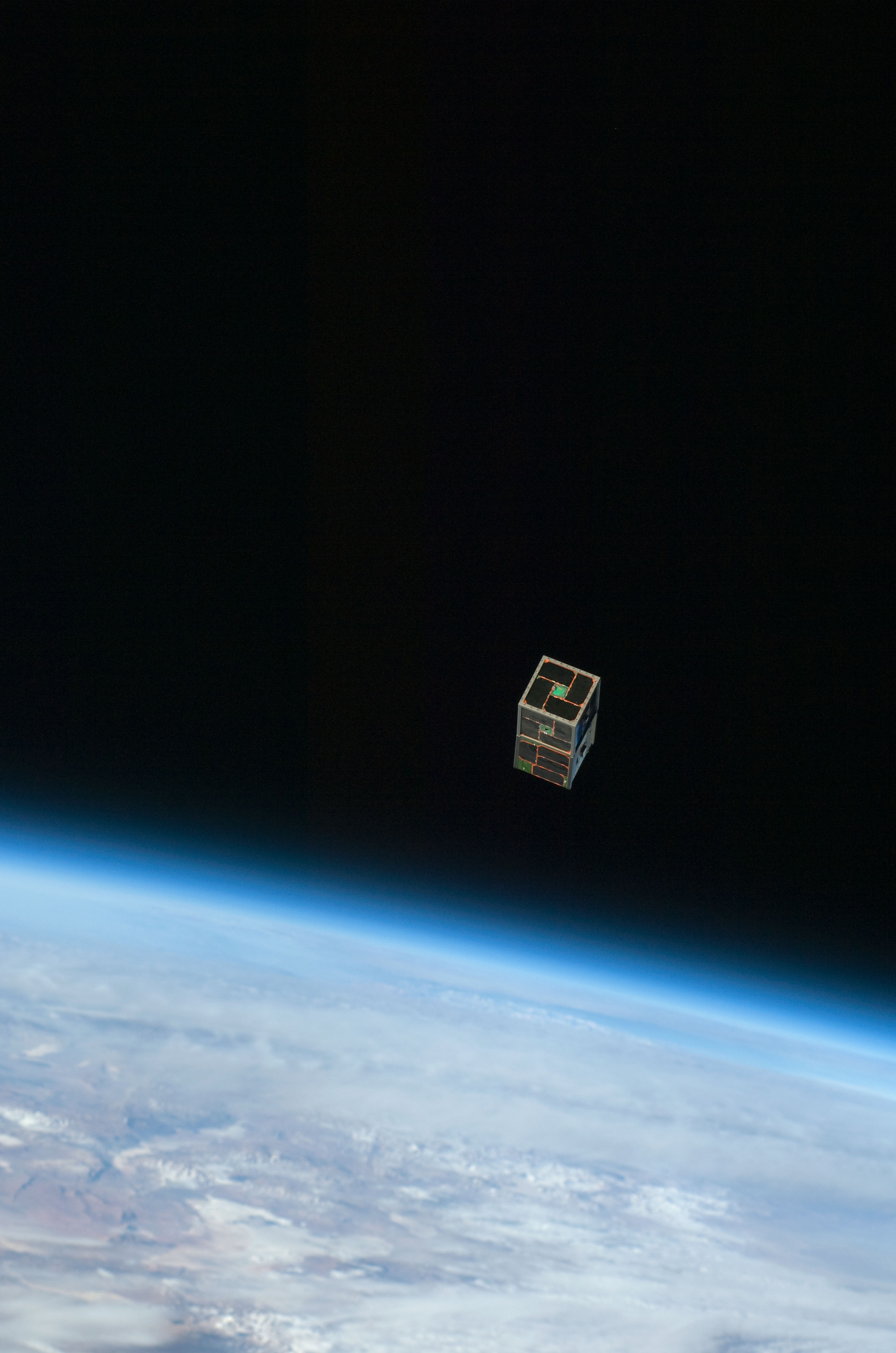
- DRAGONSat as photographed after its release from Space Shuttle Endeavour's payload bay
- COSPAR ID: 2009-038B
- SATCAT no.: 35690

Start of mission
- Launch date: 07:00, July 30, 2009
- Rocket: Space Shuttle Endeavour
- Launch site: Kennedy LC-39A

End of mission
- Disposal: Failed to separate from companion

Orbital parameters
- Reference system: geocentric
- Regime: LEO
- Inclination: 51.7°

DRAGONSat (Dual RF Astrodynamic GPS Orbital Navigator Satellite) was a 2000s pair of nanosatellites that were to demonstrate autonomous rendezvous and docking (ARD) in low Earth orbit (LEO) for NASA. It was intended to gather flight data with a global positioning system (GPS) receiver strictly designed for space applications to gather flight data in the space environment. ARD is the capability of two independent spacecraft to rendezvous in orbit and dock without crew intervention. The mission failed when the DRAGONSats failed to separate from their carrier spacecraft.

One DRAGONSat was built by the University of Texas and the other one was built by Texas A and M University, the Space Shuttle Payload Launcher (SSPL), These satellite projects were planned to rendezvous and dock with each other in space without the benefit of human intervention.

DRAGONSat was planned to be an eight-year program with a launch of the satellites approximately every two years. The first three missions were to test individual components and subsystems while the final mission was to culminate with the successful docking of two satellites. Each mission was planned to build on the previous mission culminating in a fully autonomous rendezvous and docking mission. Both universities were required to use GPS receivers designed by NASA in order to determine its functionality. One of the objectives was to demonstrate precision real-time navigation capability as well as precision relative navigation between the two satellites.

== Planned operations ==
DRAGONSat is a pair of two 5 inches x 5 inches x 5 inches satellites which are launched from the Shuttle orbiter payload bay. Both satellites are built of aluminum with a mass of approximately 7.5 kg. Each picosatellite is covered with photo-voltaic cells and will enable a longer active life in orbit. Each satellite also has a dipole antenna and two antennas for the GPS receiver. The satellites are ejected from the SSPL which is located on the payload bay sidewall. They were intended to be ejected as a pair and once at a safe distance from the Space Shuttle, they would separate and begin the experiment. Data collection will be downlinked to ground stations for as long as the satellites are able to transmit.

Both DRAGONSat were launched together in the Space Shuttle Payload Launcher (SSPL) from the side walls of the orbiter payload bay. The initial pair was launched on July 30, 2009 aboard STS-127, and on Flight Day 16, the first pair of DRAGONSats were inserted into orbit. Space Shuttle Endeavour placed them in orbit at 8:35 am EDT. for their planned multiyear mission to study automatic dockings in space. Deployment occurred over central South America at an altitude of 218 miles. Subsequent DRAGONsat flights never occurred after the program was cancelled.

== Specifications ==
Section source
DRAGONSat-1 "BEVO-1"

- Country: USA
- Application: Spacecraft docking technology
- Operator: University of Texas at Austin
- Contractors: University of Texas at Austin
- Equipment: DRAGON GPS Receiver
- Configuration: 5" cube
- Propulsion: none
- Lifetime: 3.5 kg
- Mass: 5 kg

DRAGONSat-2 "AggieSat-2"

- Country: USA
- Application: Spacecraft docking technology
- Operator: Texas A&M University
- Contractors: Texas A&M University
- Equipment: DRAGON GPS Receiver
- Configuration: 5" cube
- Propulsion: None
- Lifetime: 3.5 kg
- Mass: 3.5 kg

== See also ==
- CubeSat
- PicoSAT
