= Comparison of solid-fuelled orbital launch systems =

This article contains the lift launch systems constructed by some solid fuel stages except the final stage.

== All stages solid fueled ==
Vehicle	Stage number	Origin	Manufacturer	Height (meter)	Diameter (meter)	Weight (ton)	Mass to LEO (kg)	Mass to Other Orbit (kg)	Maiden flight	Retired	Record	Status
ASLV	5	India	ISRO	24	1	41	150		1987	1994	2/4	Retired
Epsilon (without PBS)	3	Japan	IHI AeroSpace	24.4	2.6	90.8			2016	-	1/1	Active
J-I	2(+1)	Japan	NASDA / ISAS	33.1	1.8	88.5	1000		1996	1996	1/1*	Retired
Kaituozhe-1	4	China	CASIC	13.6	1.4			SSO: 50	2002	?	0/2	?
Kaituozhe-2		China	CASIC						2017		1/1	Active
Kuaizhou-11	4	China	CASIC	?	2.2	78	1500	SSO: 1000@700 km	2017	-	-	Development
L-4S	4	Japan	Tokyo univ.	16.5	0.735	9.4	26		1966	1970	1/5	Retired
Minotaur I	4	United States	Orbital Sciences	19.2	1.67	36.2	580	SSO: 331	2000	-	11/11	Active
Minotaur IV Lite	3	United States	Orbital Sciences	23.88	2.34	86.3	-		2010	-	2/2*	Active
Minotaur IV	4	United States	Orbital Sciences	23.88	2.34	86.3	1735		2010	-	1/1	Active
Minotaur IV+	4	United States	Orbital Sciences	23.88	2.34	86.3	1985		2011		1/1	Active
Minotaur IV/Orion 38	4	United States	Orbital Sciences						2017	-	1/1	Active
Minotaur V	5	United States	Orbital Sciences		1.67			GTO:640 TLI:447	2013	-	1/1	Active
M-3C	3	Japan	Tokyo univ.	20.2	1.41	41.8	195		1974	1979	3/4	Retired
M-3H	3	Japan	Tokyo univ.	23.8	1.41	48.7	300		1977	1978	3/3	Retired
M-3S	3	Japan	Tokyo univ.	23.8	1.41	48.7	300		1980	1984	4/4	Retired
M-3SII	3(+1)	Japan	ISAS	27.8	1.41	61	770		1985	1995	7/8	Retired
M-4S	4	Japan	Tokyo univ.	23.6	1.41	43.6	180		1970	1972	3/4	Retired
M-V	3(+1)	Japan	ISAS	30.8	2.5	140	1850	Interplanetary: 500	1997	2006	6/7	Retired
Pegasus	3	United States	Orbital Sciences	16.9	1.27	18.5	375		1990		10/11	?
Pegasus XL	3	United States	Orbital Sciences	17.6	1.27	23.13	443		1994	-	29/32	Active
Qaem 100	3	Iran	IRGC				80		2022	-	2/3	Active
Scout	4	United States	NACA	23	1.01	21.5			1961	1994		Retired
Scout-A	4	United States	NACA	25	1.01	17.85			1965	1970		Retired
Shavit	3	Israel	IAI	15.3	1.352	23.2	160		1988	1990	2/2	Retired
Shavit1 (LK-A)	3	Israel	IAI	17.2	1.352	27.3	240		1995	2004	2/4	Retired
Shavit2 (LK-1)	3	Israel	IAI	19.5	1.352	31.2	350		2007	-	4/4	Active
SLV	4	India	ISRO	22	1	17	40		1979	1983	3/4	Retired
RPS-420	4	Indonesia	LAPAN	9.5	0.42		50		(2014)	-	0/0	Development
SPARK (Super Strypi)	3	United States	Hawaii, Sandia, Aerojet Rocketdyne					SSO: 250	2015	-	0/1	Active
SS-520(3-stage)	3	Japan	ISAS/JAXA	9.54	0.52	2.6	4	-	2017	-	1/2	Active
Start-1	4	Russia	MIT	22.7	1.61	47.2	532	SSO: 167	1993	-	6/6	Active
Taiwan SLV	4	Republic of China	NSPO				50		-	-	0/0	Development
Taurus	3+1	United States	Orbital Sciences	27	2.35	69	1259	SSO: 889	1994	-	5/6	?
Taurus XL; Minotaur-C	3+1	United States	Orbital Sciences	32	2.35	77	1458	SSO: 1054	2004	-	2/4	Active
VLS-1	4	Brazil	AEB, DCTA-IAE, Avibrás	19.5	1.01	50.7	380		1997	2016	0/3	Retired
VLM-1	3	Brazil/Germany	AEB, DCTA-IAE, Avibrás, DLR	19.6	1.45	28	30	-	2025	-	0/0	Development

* Including suborbital mission

== All stages solid fueled except uppermost stage ==
Vehicle	Main stages		Origin	Manufacturer	Height (meter)	Diameter (meter)	Weight (ton)	Mass to... (kg)		Maiden flight	Retired	Record	Status
Vehicle	Solid	Liquid	Origin	Manufacturer	Height (meter)	Diameter (meter)	Weight (ton)	LEO	Other orbit	Maiden flight	Retired	Record	Status
Ares I	1	1	United States	Alliant Techsystems / Boeing	94	5.5		25000		(2015)		0/0	Cancelled
Athena I	2	1	United States	Lockheed Martin						1995	2001	3/4	Retired
Athena Ic	2	1	United States	Lockheed Martin; Alliant Techsystems						(2012)		0/0	Development
Athena II	3	1	United States	Lockheed Martin	30.5	2.36	120.2	1896		1998	1999	2/3	Retired
Athena IIc	3	1	United States	Lockheed Martin; Alliant Techsystems						(2012)		0/0	Development
Epsilon PBS	3	1	Japan	IHI AeroSpace	24.4	2.6	90.8			2013	-	3/4	Active
Hyperbola-1	3	1	China	i-Space	20		31	300		2019	-	1/1	Active
Kuaizhou-1	3	1	China	CASIC	18	1.4	32	~300	SSO: 430@500 km	2013	-	1/1	Active
Kuaizhou-1A	3	1	China	CASIC		1.4	30	~300	SSO: 200@700 km	2014	-	2/2	Active
Long March 11	3	1	China							2015	-	7/7	Active
Minotaur IV HAPS			United States	Orbital Sciences	23.88	2.34	86.3			2010	-	1/1	Active
Vega	3	1	European Union	ESA / ISA	30	3	137	2000(?)	SSO: 1500	2012	2024	20/22	Retired
Vega-C	3	1	European Union	ESA / ISA	35	3.4				2022	-	1/2	Active
Zuljanah	2	1	Iran	MODAFL	25.5	1.5	52	220			-	0/0	Development

== See also ==
- Comparison of orbital rocket engines
- Comparison of orbital launch systems
- Comparison of orbital launchers families
- Comparison of orbital spacecraft
- Comparison of space station cargo vehicles
- List of space launch system designs
- List of orbital launch systems
