= SAPPHIRE =

U.S. amateur radio satellite

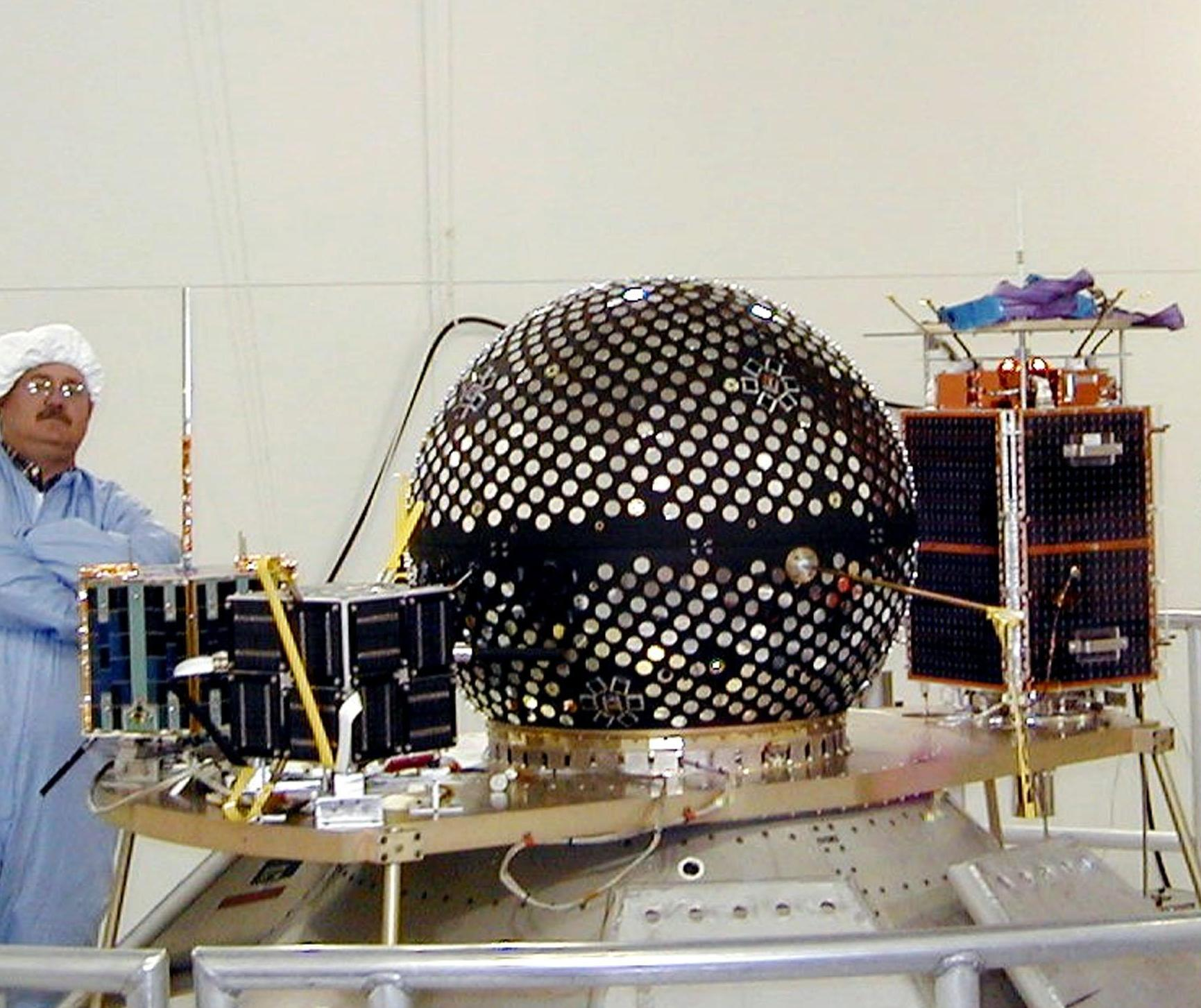
- SAPPHIRE satellite
- Mission type: Communications
- Operator: USNA / University of Santa Clara
- COSPAR ID: 2001-043D
- SATCAT no.: 26932
- Mission duration: 2 years and 6 months

Spacecraft properties
- Manufacturer: Stanford University
- Launch mass: 16 kg (35 lb)

Start of mission
- Launch date: 30 September 2001, 02:40 UTC
- Rocket: Athena 1 LM-001
- Launch site: Kodiak LP-1
- Contractor: Lockheed Martin

End of mission
- Disposal: Decommissioned
- Last contact: 2005

Orbital parameters
- Reference system: Geocentric
- Regime: Low Earth
- Eccentricity: 0.0
- Altitude: 794 km (493 mi)
- Inclination: 67°
- Period: 101 minutes
- Epoch: 30 Sep 2001

SAPPHIRE (Stanford AudioPhonic PHotographic IR Experiment, also called Navy-OSCAR 45) was a satellite built by the Stanford University students in Palo Alto, California.

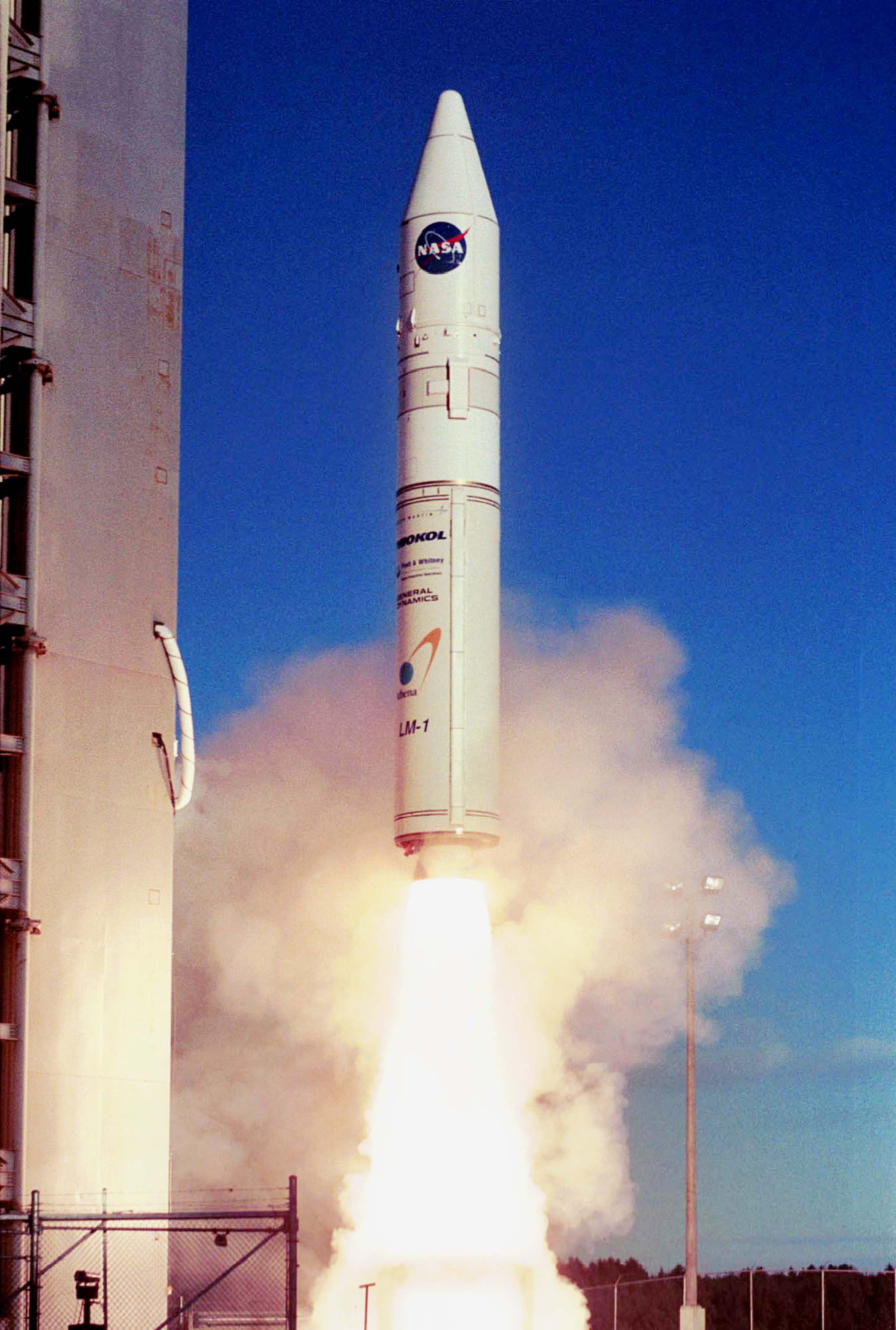
Athena 1 rocket launching SAPPHIRE from Kodiak Island, AK.

The satellite was launched on September 30, 2001, together with Starshine 3, PICOSat and PCSat on an Athena 1 rocket at the Kodiak Launch Complex, Alaska, United States.

Its purpose was the training of students, the operation of an infrared sensor, a digital camera, a speech synthesizer and from 2002 the operation of an APRS digipeater. He also served to train midshipmen of the US Naval Academy in the field of satellite control.

The satellite's mission ended in early 2005.

== Frequencies ==
- Uplink: 145.945 MHz
- Downlink: 437.1 MHz
- Mode: 1200 bit/s AFSK
- Call sign: KE6QMD

== See also ==
- OSCAR
