= Ikonos =

Commercial Earth observation satellite

Ikonos-2
- Mission type: Earth observation
- Operator: DigitalGlobe; Formerly GeoEye, Space Imaging
- COSPAR ID: 1999-051A
- SATCAT no.: 25919
- Mission duration: Final: 15 years, 6 months, 6 days

Spacecraft properties
- Bus: LM-900
- Manufacturer: Lockheed Martin Space Systems
- Launch mass: 817 kg (1,800 lb)
- Dimensions: 1.83 × 1.57 m (6.0 × 5.2 ft)
- Power: 1,500 W

Start of mission
- Launch date: 24 September 1999, 18:22 UTC
- Rocket: Athena II, LM-007
- Launch site: Vandenberg AFB SLC-6
- Contractor: Lockheed Martin
- Entered service: December 1999

End of mission
- Disposal: Decommissioned
- Deactivated: 31 March 2015

Orbital parameters
- Reference system: Geocentric
- Regime: Low Earth
- Eccentricity: 0.00028
- Perigee altitude: 678 km (421 mi)
- Apogee altitude: 682 km (424 mi)
- Inclination: 98.2°
- Period: 98.4 minutes
- Epoch: 24 September 1999, 18:22 UTC

Main telescope
- Type: Cassegrain
- Diameter: 70 cm (28 in)
- Focal length: 10 m (394 in)
- Focal ratio: f/14.3
- Wavelengths: Panchromatic: 450–900 nm Multispectral: 450–860 nm
- Resolution: Panchromatic: 0.82–1 m (32–39 in); Multispectral: 3.28–4 m (129–157 in)

IKONOS was a commercial Earth observation satellite, and was the first to collect publicly available high-resolution imagery at 1- and 4-meter resolution. It collected multispectral (MS) and panchromatic (PAN) imagery. The capability to observe Earth via space-based telescope has been called "one of the most significant developments in the history of the space age", and IKONOS brought imagery rivaling that of military spy satellites to the commercial market. IKONOS imagery began being sold on 1 January 2000, and the spacecraft was retired in 2015.

== History ==
IKONOS originated under the Lockheed Corporation as the Commercial Remote Sensing System (CRSS) satellite. In April 1994 Lockheed was granted one of the first licenses from the U.S. Department of Commerce for commercial satellite high-resolution imagery. On 25 October 1995 partner company Space Imaging received a license from the Federal Communications Commission (FCC) to transmit telemetry from the satellite in the eight-gigahertz Earth exploration-satellite services band. Prior to launch, Space Imaging changed the name of the satellite system to IKONOS. The name comes from the Greek word eikōn, for "image".

Two satellites were originally planned for operation. IKONOS-1 was launched on 27 April 1999 at 18:22 UTC from Vandenberg AFB Space Launch Complex 6, but Athena II rocket's payload fairing did not separate due to an electrical malfunction, resulting in the satellite failing to reach orbit and falling into the atmosphere over the South Pacific Ocean.

IKONOS-2 was built in parallel with and as a nearly identical twin to IKONOS-1. Whereas IKONOS-1 was built with Ring Laser Gyros (RLGs) for attitude rate sensors, IKONOS-2 fortuitously was built with Hemispherical Resonator Gyros (HRGs). RLGs were found to be incompatible with long-duration space missions, whereas HRGs could last 10 or more years in space. Completion of IKONOS-2 construction was projected for July 1999 with a January 2000 launch. In reaction to the loss of IKONOS-1, the spacecraft was renamed IKONOS and its processing accelerated, resulting in a launch on 24 September 1999 at 18:22 UTC, also from Vandenberg aboard an Athena II rocket. The company began selling IKONOS imagery on the market on 1 January 2000.

In December 2000, IKONOS received the "Best of What's New" Grant Award in Aviation & Space from Popular Science magazine. The acquisition of Space Imaging and its assets by Orbimage was announced in September 2005 and finalized in January 2006. The merged company was renamed GeoEye, which was itself acquired by DigitalGlobe in January 2013.

DigitalGlobe operated IKONOS until its retirement on 31 March 2015. During its lifetime, IKONOS produced 597,802 public images, covering more than 400 million km^{2} (154 million sq mi) of area.

== Specifications ==
=== Spacecraft ===
IKONOS was a three-axis stabilized spacecraft designed by Lockheed Martin Space Systems. The design later became known as the LM-900 satellite bus and was optimized to carry remote sensing payloads. Four reaction wheels stabilized the spacecraft's altitude, which was measured by two star trackers and a Sun sensor. Orbital position information was provided by a GPS receiver. The spacecraft body was a hexagonal design of 1.83 by 1.57 meters (6.0 by 5.2 ft) and 817 kilograms (1,800 lb), with 1.5 kilowatts of power provided by three solar panels. Its design life was seven years. IKONOS operated in a Sun-synchronous, near-polar, circular orbit at approximately 680 km (423 mi).

=== Optical Sensor Assembly ===
IKONOS's primary instrument was the Optical Sensor Assembly (OSA), designed and built by Kodak. It had a primary mirror aperture of 70 cm (28 in), and a folded optical focal length of 10 m (394 in) using 5 mirrors. The main mirror featured a honeycomb design to reduce mass. The detectors at the focal plane included a panchromatic sensor with 13,500 pixels cross-track, and four multispectral sensors (blue, green, red, and near-infrared) each with 3,375 pixels along-track. Its nadir image swath was 11.3 km (7 mi). Total instrument mass was 171 kg (377 lb) and it consumed 350 watts.

Spatial and spectral resolutions
Band	0.8-meter panchromatic	4-meter multispectral 1-meter pan-sharpened
Pan	526–929 nm	
1 (Blue)		445–516 nm
2 (Green)		506–595 nm
3 (Red)		632–698 nm
4 (Near IR)		757–853 nm

== See also ==
- GeoEye-1
