= PicoSAT =

Microsatellite testing electronic components/systems in space conditions

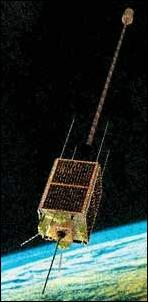
- Mission type: Bioscience
- Operator: USAF
- COSPAR ID: 2001-043B

Spacecraft properties
- Spacecraft type: Microsat-70
- Manufacturer: SSTL
- Launch mass: 68 kilograms (150 lb)

Start of mission
- Launch date: 30 September 2001, 19:39:00 UTC
- Rocket: Athena I
- Launch site: Kodiak LP-1

Orbital parameters
- Reference system: Geocentric
- Regime: LEO
- Perigee altitude: 790 kilometres (490 mi)
- Apogee altitude: 800 kilometres (500 mi)
- Inclination: 100.2º
- Period: 100.7 minutes

PicoSAT, launched on September 30, 2001, is a real time tracking satellite. The name "PICO" combines the first letters of all four of its experiments (see below). PICOSat series are designed for a minimum of one year of on-orbit operations.

== Background ==
The name Picosat was coined by Peter P. Vekinis and was used to describe a constellation of amateur radio satellites, called the Picosat System, first analog, then digital, that would offer instant emergency communications, worldwide, using cheap amateur radio transceivers. The details were presented at AMSAT's conference in Orlando, Florida, in 1995 and in Tucson, Arizona, in 1996.

== History ==
=== Early versions ===
Tethered Picosats, Picosat 5, Picosat 6, Picosat 7, and Picosat 8 are hectogram mass satellites that were ejected from OPAL (2000-004C). The primary builders were by engineering students at Santa Clara University in California. They used off-the-shelf components and miniature batteries, for technology tests. The Tethered Picosats were a pair of Picosats tethered together by a short wire, was ejected on February 8, 2000, from an OPAL Launch System. Picosats 7 and 8 on launched on 11 February, and Picosats 5 and 6 launched on 12 February. Alternate common names were given by the investigators: Picosats 7 and 8 are the Thelma and Louise pair and Picosats 5 and 6 are the JAK and Stensat pair. The Tethered Picosats were functional for a short time after ejection, communicating with each other by microwatt radio transmitters. There was no indication if the Picosats (5, 6, 7, and 8) were operational at the time of ejection into orbit. USSPACECOM's Picosat numbers extending to eight is erroneous. There were only six Picosats on board the OPAL, with possibly one or two still on the ground, with tests to communicate with the orbiters. The tests were managed by the Defense Advanced Research Project Agency (DARPA).

=== Current version ===
The current Picosat 9 is a British-built (US DOD-funded) microsatellite (67 kg) to test electronic components/systems in space conditions. Oboard this model carries four test payloads: Polymer Battery Experiment (PBEX), Ionospheric Occultation Experiment (IOX), Coherent Electromagnetic Radio Tomography (CERTO) and On Orbit Mission Control (OOMC) an ultra-quiet platform (OPPEX). PICOSat flies in an 800 km circular orbit with a 67 degree inclination. PICOSat uses a gravity gradient boom for stabilization. The body mounted solar panels produce an average on orbit power of 22 W. The Ultra-Quiet Platform (UQP), developed by the US Air Force Research Lab, aims to provide a 10:1 reduction in vibration isolation over a 100 Hz bandwidth between the spacecraft bus and a science payload.

== PicoSat specifications ==
=== PicoSat 1 & 2 (tethered) ===
- NORAD ID: 26080
- Int'l Code: 2000-004H
- Perigee: 741.4 km
- Apogee: 788.1 km
- Inclination: 100.2°
- Period: 100.0 min
- Launch date: January 27, 2000
- Source: United States (US)
- Launch vehicle: Minotaur
- Launch site: Vandenberg Air Force Base.

=== PicoSat 9 ===
- NORAD ID: 26930
- Int'l Code: 2001-043B
- Perigee: 791.0 km
- Apogee: 806.5 km
- Inclination: 67.0°
- Period: 100.7 min
- Launch date: September 30, 2001 at 02:40:00 UTC
- Source: United States (US)
- Launch Vehicle: Athena I
- Launch Site: Kodiak Launch Complex

=== Identifications ===
International designation numbers with USSPACECOM Catalog numbers are in parentheses:

- 2000-004H (26080) Picosat 1/2
- 2000-004J (26091) Picosat 5
- 2000-004K (26092) Picosat 6
- 2000-004L (26093) Picosat 7
- 2000-004M (26094) Picosat 8
- 2001-043B (26930) Picosat 9

== See also ==
- DRAGONSat
- C/NOFS
- CubeSat
- Los Angeles AFB
