= Lewis (satellite) =

Earth imaging satellite

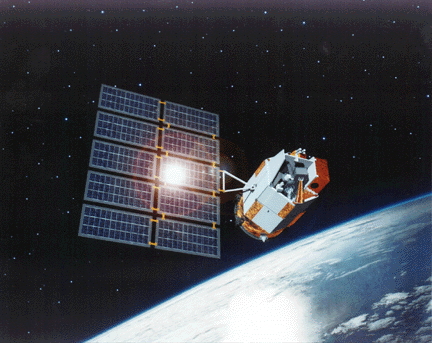
- Mission type: Technology; Remote sensing UV Astronomy
- Operator: NASA
- COSPAR ID: 1997-044A
- SATCAT no.: 24909
- Mission duration: 1-3 years (planned); 3 days (achieved)

Spacecraft properties
- Bus: T200B
- Manufacturer: TRW
- Launch mass: 288 kilograms (635 lb)

Start of mission
- Launch date: 23 August 1997, 06:51:01 UTC
- Rocket: LMLV-1 (Athena I)
- Launch site: Vandenberg SLC-6
- Contractor: Lockheed Martin

End of mission
- Last contact: 26 August 1997
- Decay date: 28 September 1997

Orbital parameters
- Reference system: Geocentric
- Regime: Low Earth
- Perigee altitude: 124 kilometers (77 mi); Planned: 523 kilometres (325 mi)
- Apogee altitude: 134 kilometers (83 mi); Planned: 523 kilometres (325 mi)
- Inclination: 97.5 degrees
- Epoch: 23 August 1997, 02:51:01 UTC

Instruments
- HSI; LEISA; UCB

Lewis was an American satellite which was to have been operated by NASA as part of the Small Satellite Technology Initiative. It carried two experimental Earth imaging instruments, and an ultraviolet astronomy payload. Due to a design flaw it failed within three days of reaching orbit, before it became operational.

Lewis was a 288 kilograms (635 lb) spacecraft, which was designed to operate for between one and three years. It was built by TRW under a contract which was signed on 11 July 1994. Its primary instruments were the Hyperspectral Imager, the Linear Etalon Imaging Spectral Array and the Ultraviolet Cosmic Background experiment. A number of technology demonstration payloads were also flown.

== Launch ==
Lewis was launched by a LMLV-1 (Athena I) rocket flying from Space Launch Complex 6 at the Vandenberg Air Force Base. The launch was originally scheduled to take place in September 1996, but it was delayed due to technical problems affecting the rocket. Launch finally occurred at 06:51:01 GMT on 23 August 1997, and Lewis was successfully placed into a parking orbit with an apogee of 134 kilometres (83 mi), a perigee of 124 kilometres (77 mi), and 97.5 degrees of inclination. Lewis was to have raised itself into a higher orbit, at an altitude of 523 kilometres (325 mi).

== Mission failure ==
On 26 August, the satellite began spinning out of control at a rate of 2 rpm, which led to a loss of communications with ground controllers, and affected the ability of its solar arrays to generate power. Controllers were unable to regain contact with the spacecraft, and it was declared a total loss. It reentered the atmosphere at 11:58 GMT on 28 September 1997. The cause of the failure was later established to be a design flaw in the spacecraft's attitude control system, which had been designed for the TOMS-EP spacecraft and was not sufficiently modified to be compatible with Lewis.

== See also ==
- 1997 in spaceflight
