= Coherent electromagnetic radio tomography =

The Coherent Electromagnetic Radio Tomography (CERTO) is a radio beacon which measures ionospheric parameters in coordination with ground receivers. CERTO provides global ionospheric maps to aid prediction of radio wave scattering. CERTO was developed by the Naval Research Lab and is one of the 4 experiment packages aboard the PicoSAT satellite. CERTO provides near–real-time measurements of the ionosphere. CERTO was used for the Equatorial Vortex Experiment in 2013.

== Specifications ==
- NSSDC ID: 2001-043B-01A
- Mission: PicoSAT 9
