= Ionospheric Occultation Experiment =

Remote sensing satellite to improve ionospheric and thermospheric forecasts

The Ionospheric Occultation Experiment (IOX) was a remote sensing satellite package that used a dual frequency Global Positioning System (GPS) receiver to measure properties of the ionosphere. IOX demonstrated remote sensing techniques for future United States Department of Defense space systems and helped to improve operational models for ionospheric and thermospheric forecasts.

IOX was developed by the United States Air Force Space and Missile Systems Center and was one of four experiment packages on PicoSAT, which was launched by an Athena rocket in September 2001.

== Specifications ==
- NSSDC ID: 2001-043B-02
- Mission: PicoSAT 9
