= Air Force Research Laboratory =

Scientific research organization for the US Air Force and US Space Force

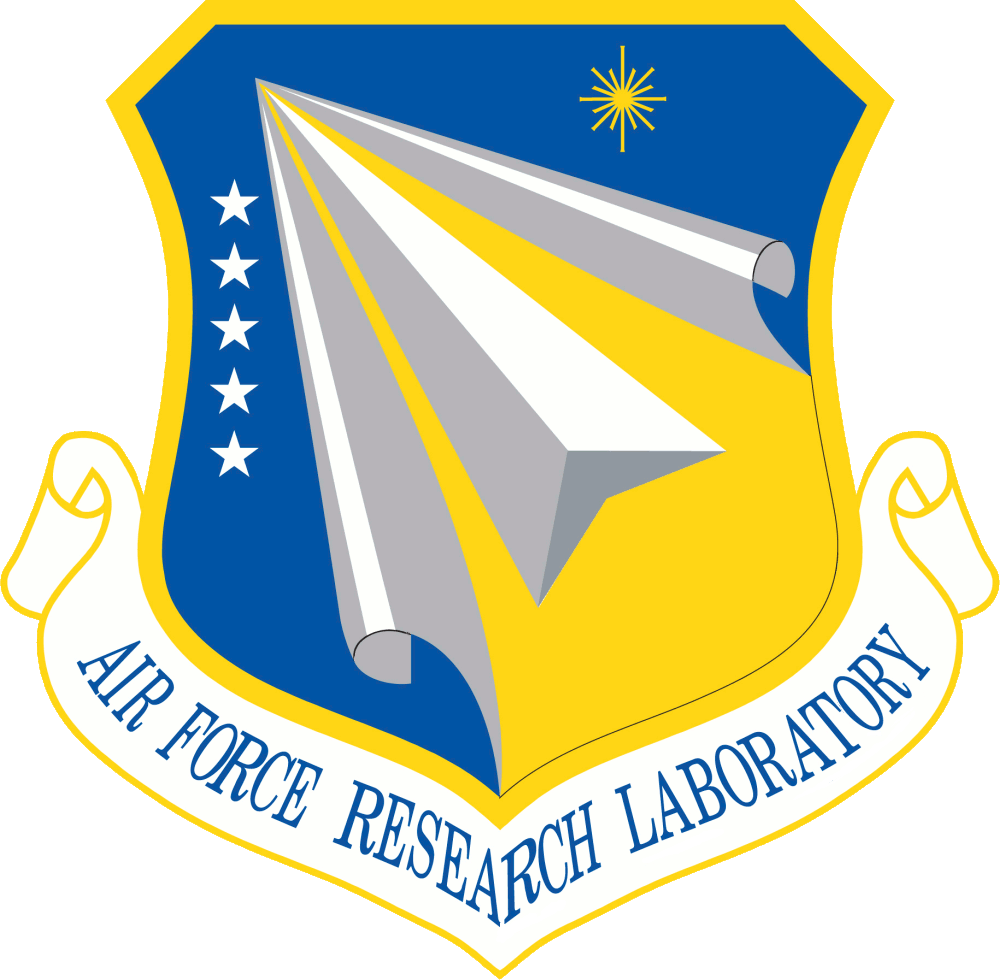
- Air Force Research Laboratory emblem
- Active: October 1997–present
- Country: United States
- Branch: United States Air Force; United States Space Force
- Type: Research and development
- Size: 4,200 civilian 1,200 military
- Part of: Air Force Materiel Command
- Garrison/HQ: Wright-Patterson Air Force Base; 39°49′23″N 084°02′58″W
- Decorations: AFOEA
- Website: www.afrl.af.mil

Commanders
- Commander: Brig. Gen. Douglas P. Wickert
- Deputy Commander: Col Brett J. Cooper
- Command Chief: CCM Timothey C. Hodgin
- Mobilization Assistant to the Commander: Col Joseph W. Tringe

The Air Force Research Laboratory (AFRL) is a scientific research and development detachment of the United States Air Force Materiel Command dedicated to leading the discovery, development, and integration of direct-energy based aerospace warfighting technologies, planning and executing the Air Force science and technology program, and providing warfighting capabilities to United States air, space, and cyberspace forces. It controls the entire Air Force science and technology research budget which was $2.4 billion in 2006.

The Laboratory was formed at Wright-Patterson Air Force Base near Dayton, Ohio, on 31 October 1997 as a consolidation of four Air Force laboratory facilities (Wright, Phillips, Rome, and Armstrong) and the Air Force Office of Scientific Research under a unified command. The Laboratory is composed of eight technical directorates, one wing, and the Office of Scientific Research. Each technical directorate emphasizes a particular area of research within the AFRL mission which it specializes in performing experiments in conjunction with universities and contractors.

Since the Laboratory's formation in 1997, it has conducted numerous experiments and technical demonstrations in conjunction with NASA, Department of Energy, National Laboratories, DARPA, and other research organizations within the Department of Defense. Notable projects include the X-37, X-40, X-53, HTV-3X, YAL-1A, Advanced Tactical Laser, and the Tactical Satellite Program.

In 2009, it was reported that the Laboratory may face problems in the future as 40 percent of its workers are slated to retire over the next two decades, and since 1980, the United States has not produced enough science and engineering degrees to keep up with demand.

== History ==
The first act of United States funding for fixed wing, heavier than air aircraft (hot air balloons were used earlier) was when, in 1898 the Board of Fortifications allocated $50,000 (approximately $1,640,404.04 adjusted for inflation) to Samuel Langley for the development of airframes. Several prototypes were made but these were not effective.

On 10 February 1908, the US government issued a contract with the Wright brothers to purchase an aircraft for use in the Army Signal Corps.

Despite this early momentum, the US was reluctant in spending large amounts of money on air power and fell behind. France had spent US$7.4 million, and Germany had spent 5 million at the times rates, whereas the US had only spent 125,000 before 1914 (in 1914 dollars).

In 1916, funding was approved for the first national aeronautics laboratory in Hampton, VA, named after Langley, later made into Langley Air Force Base, now part of now the site of Joint Base Langley–Eustis.

Despite funding and development leading to significantly aircraft improvements, after World War I the funding for aeronautics engineering was cut significantly.

In 1926, with the 1926 Air Corps Act, air power was recognized as its word division. The predecessors to the air force lab were working on using novel materials to create aircraft components. The predecessors to the air force research lab continued to develop new manufacturing and aerodynamic technologies until World War II.

In 1945, the Air Force Cambridge Research Laboratories were established. These laboratories were active from 1945 to 2011, following consolidation to Wright-Patterson Air Force Base and Kirtland Air Force Base under the 2005 Base Realignment and Closure Commission. The labs were founded as the Air Force Cambridge Research Center (AFCRC), a Cold War systems development organization which developed telephone modem communications for a Digital Radar Relay in 1949. Created by General Henry H. Arnold in 1945, AFCRC participated in Project Space Track and Semi-Automatic Ground Environment development.

The path to a consolidated Air Force Research Laboratory began with the passage of the Goldwater–Nichols Act which was designed to streamline the use of resources by the Department of Defense. In addition to this Act, the end of the Cold War began a period of budgetary and personnel reductions within the armed forces in preparation for a "stand-down" transition out of readiness for a global war with the Soviet Union. Prior to 1990, the Air Force laboratory system spread research out into 13 different laboratories and the Rome Air Development Center which each reported up two separate chains of command: a product center for personnel, and the Air Force Systems Command Director of Science & Technology for budgetary purposes. Bowing to the constraints of a reduced budget and personnel, the Air Force merged the existing research laboratories into four "superlabs" in December 1990. During this same time period, the Air Force Systems Command and Air Force Logistics Command merged to form Air Force Materiel Command (AFMC) in July 1992.

Air Force Laboratories Before and After 1990 Merger
Pre-Merger	Post-Merger
Weapons Laboratory, Kirtland AFB, NM	Phillips Laboratory; Kirtland AFB
Geophysics Laboratory, Hanscom AFB, MA	Phillips Laboratory; Kirtland AFB
Astronautics Laboratory, Edwards AFB, CA	Phillips Laboratory; Kirtland AFB
Avionics Laboratory, Wright-Patterson AFB, OH	Wright Laboratory; Wright-Patterson AFB
Electronics Technology Laboratory, Wright-Patterson AFB, OH	Wright Laboratory; Wright-Patterson AFB
Flight Dynamics Laboratory, Wright-Patterson AFB, OH	Wright Laboratory; Wright-Patterson AFB
Material Laboratory, Wright-Patterson AFB, OH	Wright Laboratory; Wright-Patterson AFB
Aero Propulsion and Power Laboratory; Wright-Patterson AFB, OH	Wright Laboratory; Wright-Patterson AFB
Armament Laboratory, Eglin AFB, FL	Wright Laboratory; Wright-Patterson AFB
Rome Air Development Center; Griffiss AFB, NY	Rome Laboratory; Griffiss AFB, NY
Human Resources Laboratory, Brooks AFB, TX	Armstrong Laboratory; Brooks AFB, TX
Harry G. Armstrong Aerospace; Medical Research Laboratory, Wright-Patterson AFB, OH	Armstrong Laboratory; Brooks AFB, TX
Drug Testing Laboratory, Brooks AFB, TX	Armstrong Laboratory; Brooks AFB, TX
Occupational and Environmental; Health Laboratory, Brooks AFB, TX	Armstrong Laboratory; Brooks AFB, TX

While the initial consolidation of Air Force laboratories reduced overhead and budgetary pressure, another push towards a unified laboratory structure came in the form of the National Defense Authorization Act for Fiscal Year 1996, Section 277. This section instructed the Department of Defense to produce a five-year plan for consolidation and restructuring of all defense laboratories. The currently existing laboratory structure was created in October 1997 through the consolidation of Phillips Laboratory headquartered in Albuquerque, New Mexico, Wright Laboratory in Dayton, Ohio, Rome Laboratory (formerly Rome Air Development Center) in Rome, New York, and Armstrong Laboratory in San Antonio, Texas and the Air Force Office of Scientific Research (AFOSR). The single laboratory concept was developed and championed by Maj Gen Richard Paul, who was Director of Science & Technology for AFMC and Gen Henry Viccellio Jr, and then became the first Commander of AFRL.

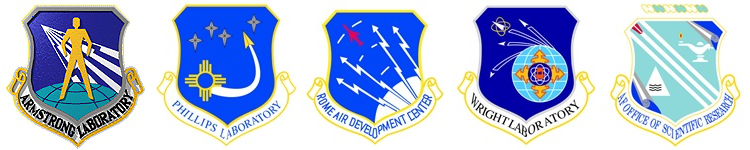
Predecessor emblems of the AFRL

With the merger of the laboratories into a single entity, the history offices at each site ceased to maintain independent histories and all history functions were transferred to a central History Office located at AFRL HQ at Wright-Patterson AFB. In homage to the predecessor laboratories, the new organization named four of the research sites after the laboratories and assured that each laboratory's history would be preserved as inactivated units.

In 2023, the National Advanced Air Mobility Center of Excellence was completed to help the Laboratory, private companies, and local academics collaborate on the research of eVTOL and UAS aircraft.

== Organization ==
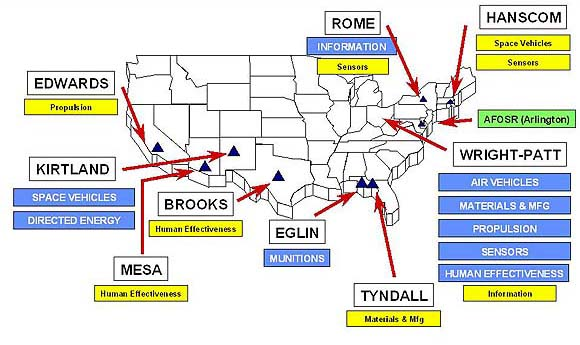
AFRL sites

The laboratory is divided into eight Technical Directorates, one wing, and the Air Force Office of Scientific Research (AFOSR) based on different areas of research. AFOSR is primarily a funding body for external research while the other directorates perform research in-house or under contract to external entities.

A directorate is roughly equivalent to a military wing. Each directorate is composed of a number of divisions and typically has at least three support divisions in addition to its research divisions. The Operations and Integration Division provides the directorate with well-conceived and executed business computing, human resource management, and business development services while the Financial Management Division manages the financial resources and the Procurement Division provides an in-house contracting capability. The support divisions at any given location frequently work together to minimize overhead at any given research site. Each division is then further broken down into branches, roughly equivalent to a military squadron.

Superimposed on the overall AFRL structure are the eight detachments. Each detachment is composed of the AFRL military personnel at any given geographical location. For example, the personnel at Wright-Patterson AFB are all part of Detachment 1. Each detachment will typically also have a unit commander separate from the directorate and division structure.

=== Headquarters AFRL ===
Located at Wright-Patterson AFB, OH, AFRL Headquarters houses the commanders and staff for the laboratories (q.v.). Its primary responsibilities are leadership, policy and guidance; unifying the common objectives of the eight Technical Directorates, the 711th wing, and AFOSR. The staff functions include Public Relations, Strategic Communication, Business Outreach, Planning, Programming, Budgeting and Execution (PPBE), Technology Transition, Transformation, Contracting and a High-Performance Computing Center. HQ also includes the Center for Rapid Innovation, which handles urgent operational requests from commanders of Air Force Space Command, Air Force Global Strike Command, Air Mobility Command, and others.

=== Air Force Office of Scientific Research ===
The Air Force Office of Scientific Research (AFOSR), located in Arlington, Virginia, invests in basic research efforts for the Air Force by funding investigation in relevant scientific areas. This work is performed in cooperation with private industry, academia, and other organizations in the Department of Defense and AFRL Directorates.

AFOSR's research is organized into four scientific directorates: the Engineering and Complex Systems Directorate; the Information and Networks Directorate; the Physical Sciences Directorate; and the Chemistry and Biological Sciences Directorate. Each directorate funds research activities that it believes will enable the technological superiority of the Air Force.

AFOSR also maintains three foreign technology offices located in London, UK (the European Office of Aerospace Research & Development), Tokyo, Japan, and Santiago, Chile. These overseas offices coordinate with the international scientific and engineering community to allow for better collaboration between the community and Air Force personnel.

AFOSR is one of the sponsors of the University Nanosatellite Program.

=== Air Vehicles Directorate ===
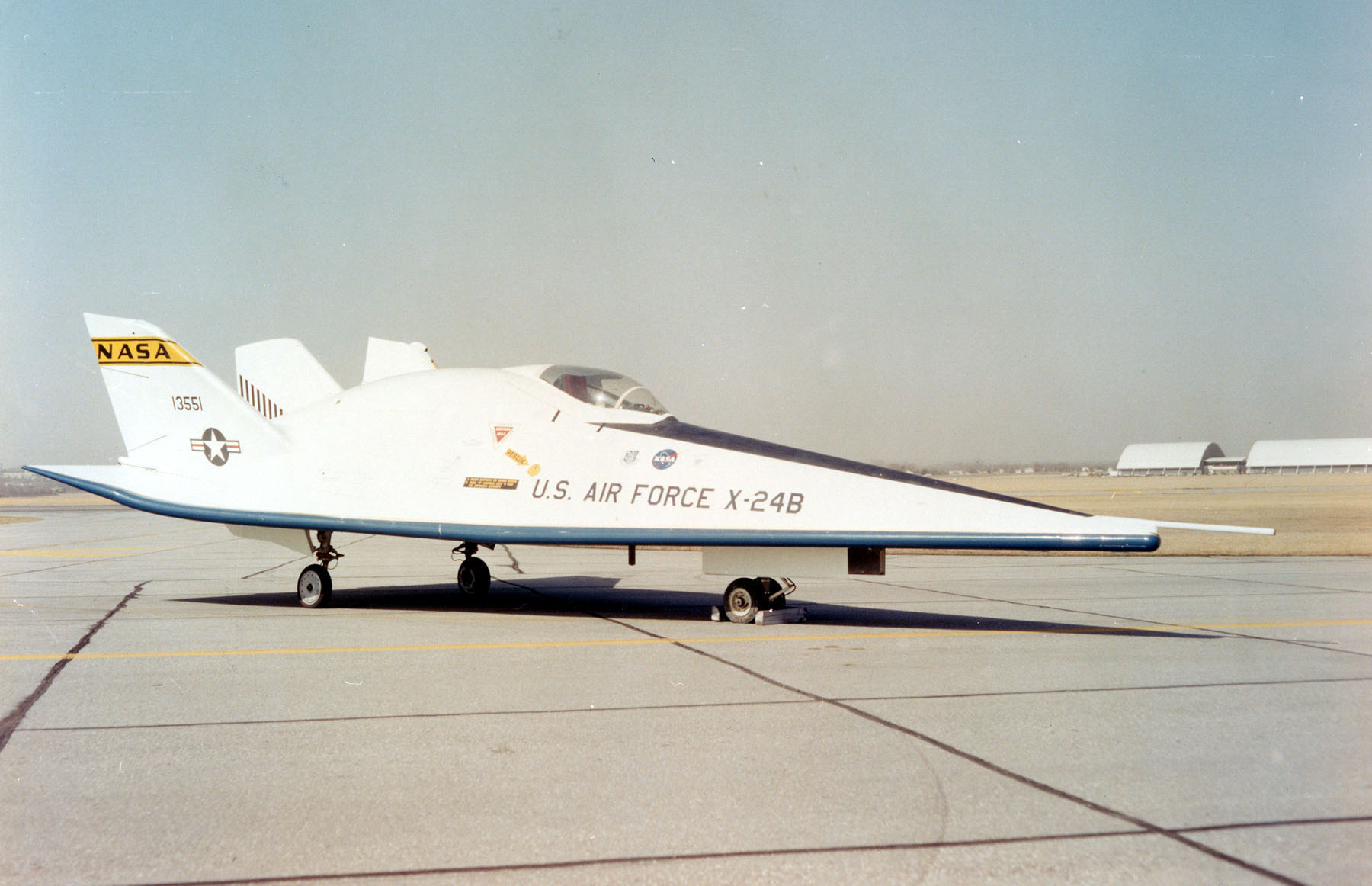
Martin Marietta X-24B

The Air Vehicles Directorate, located at Wright-Patterson AFB, has the mission of developing technologies that support cost-effective and survivable aerospace vehicles capable of accurate and quick delivery of a variety of future weapons or cargo anywhere. The current director is Col Michael Hatfield.

The Directorate has previously collaborated with NASA in the X-24 project to research concepts associated with lifting body type aircraft. The X-24 was one of a series of experimental aircraft, including the M2-F1, M2-F2, HL-10, and HL-20, by NASA and Air Force programs to develop the lifting body concept into maturity. The tests conducted during these programs led to the choice of an unpowered landing for the Space Shuttle program.

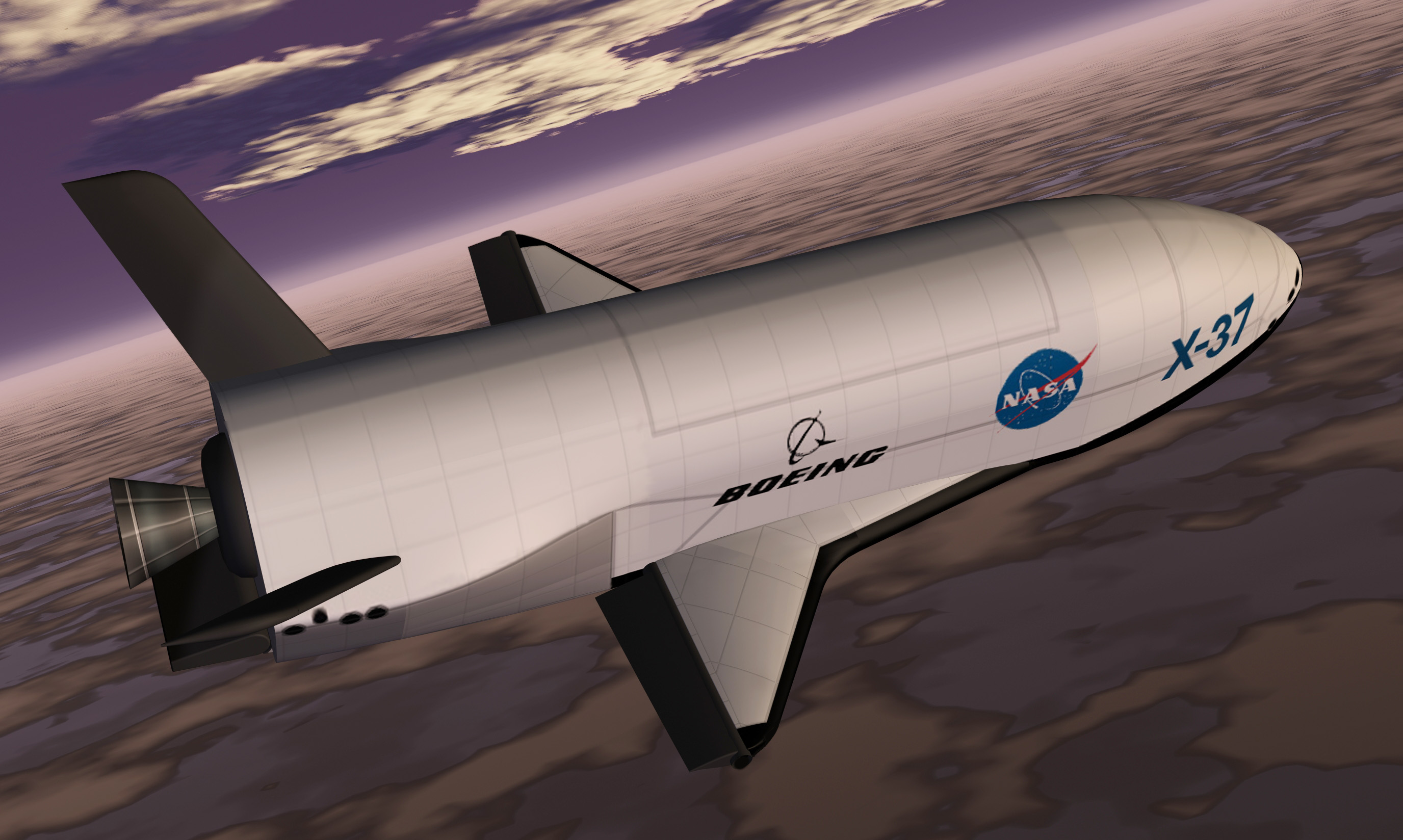
Artist's rendition of the X-37.

In 2002, the Directorate initiated the X-53 Active Aeroelastic Wing program in cooperation with NASA's Dryden Flight Research Center and Boeing Phantom Works to research ways to make more efficient use of the wing surface during high-speed maneuvers.

The Directorate is also a collaborator with DARPA, the U.S. Air Force Space and Missile Systems Center, Sandia National Laboratories and AFRL's Space Vehicles Directorate on the FALCON program, which includes the HTV-3X Blackswift hypersonic flight demonstration vehicle. The Air Vehicles Directorate also collaborated with NASA and Boeing on the initial work for the X-37B Orbital Test Vehicle and the 80% scaled version, X-40A Space Maneuver Vehicle, prior to the classification of the program and its transfer from NASA to DARPA in late 2004. The X-37 program is now managed by the Air Force Rapid Capabilities Office.

Another recent project managed by the Air Vehicles Directorate is the Advanced Composite Cargo Aircraft program begun in 2007. This is an experimental, composite aircraft program with a goal of demonstrating the feasibility of the development of a cargo airframe constructed primary of lightweight composite materials. AFRL intends to gain X-plane designation for the program once flight tests begin.

The US$250,000,000 VTHL Reusable Booster System program was initiated by the USAF in 2010.

In 2012, the Air Vehicles Directorate merged with the Propulsion Directorate to become Aerospace Systems Directorate.

=== Directed Energy Directorate ===
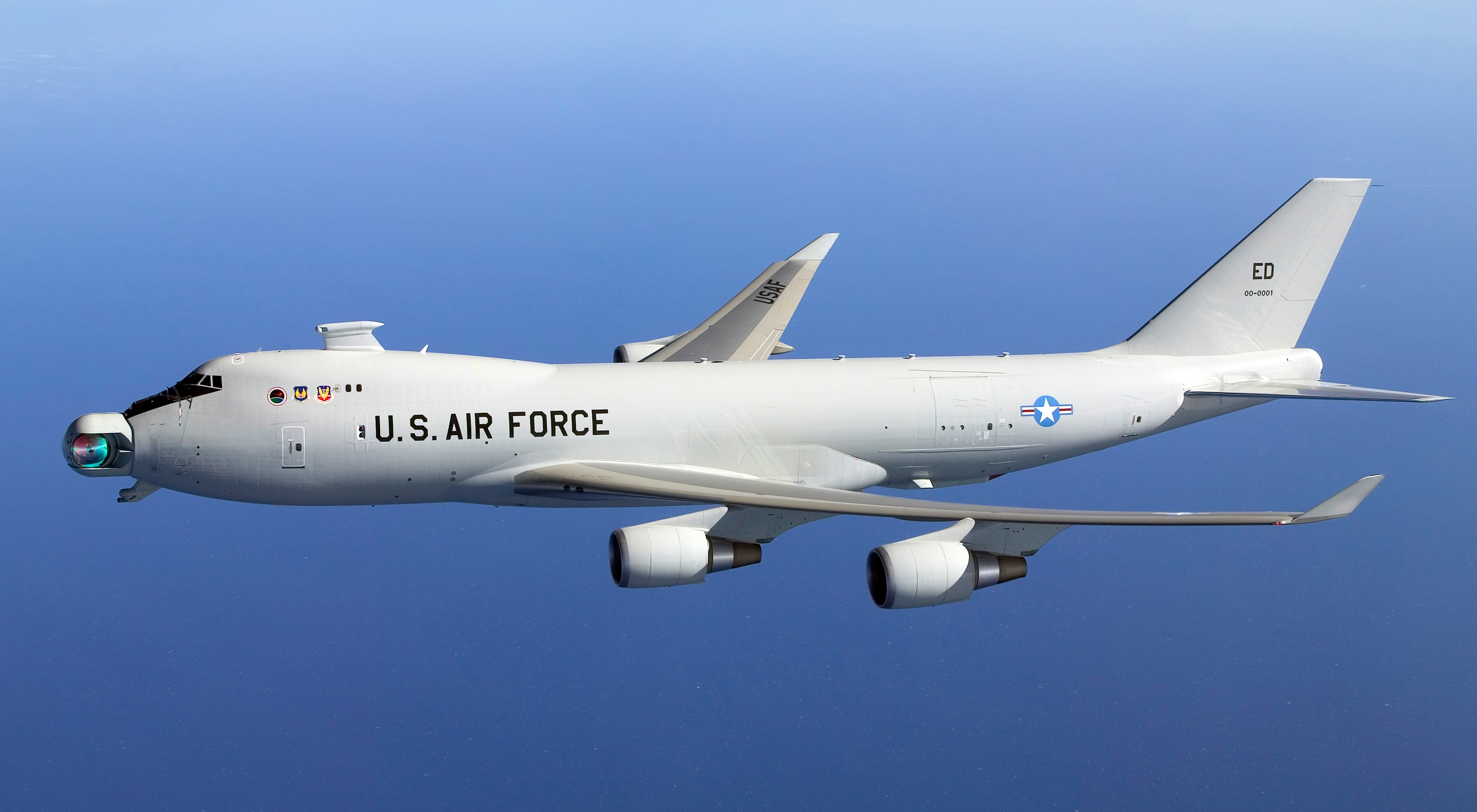
YAL-1 in flight

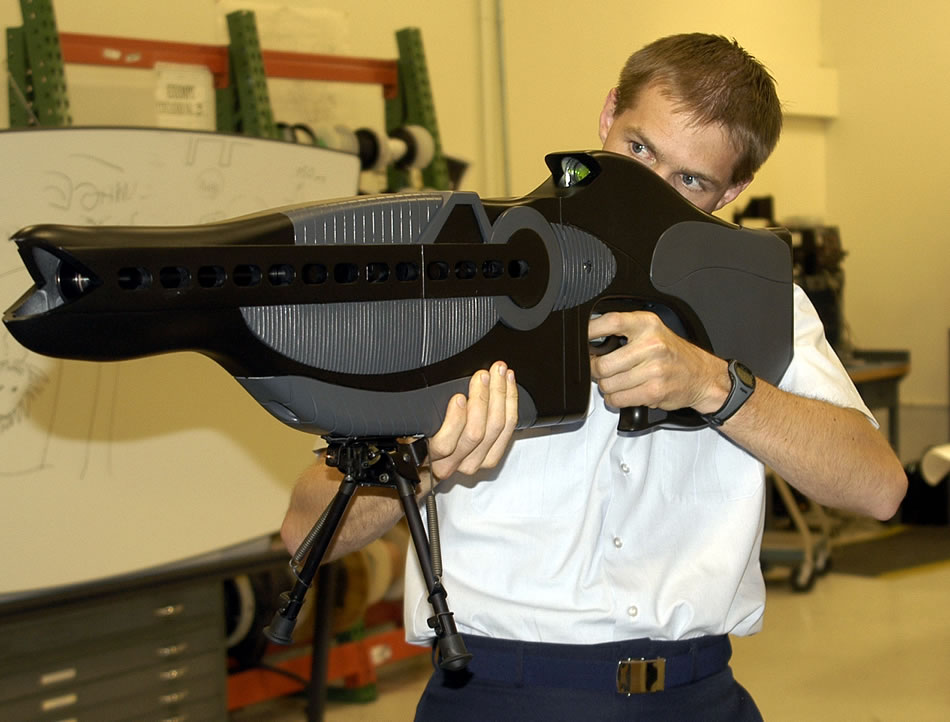
A US dazzler style weapon

In addition to serving as the Air Force's Center of Excellence for high power microwave technology, the Directed Energy Directorate is also the Department of Defense's Center of Expertise for laser development of all types. The current director is Susan Thornton.

The Starfire Optical Range at Kirtland AFB, North Oscura Peak on White Sands Missile Range, and the Air Force Maui Optical and Supercomputing observatory (AMOS) are also operated by divisions of the Directed Energy Directorate in addition to their facilities at the Directorate's headquarters at Kirtland AFB. The Starfire Optical Range is used to research various topics of advanced tracking using lasers as well as studies of atmospheric physics which examines atmospheric effects which can distort laser beams. North Oscura Peak is used to research the various technologies necessary to facilitate successful tracking and destruction of an incoming missile via a laser and is used frequently for laser-based missile defense tests. AMOS provides space observation capabilities and computational resources to AFRL, the Department of Defense and other agencies of the US Government.

Directed Energy projects typically fall into two categories: laser and microwave. Laser projects range from completely non-lethal targeting lasers to dazzlers, such as the Saber 203 used by US forces during the Somali Civil War, and the more recent PHaSR dazzler, to powerful missile defense lasers such as the chemical oxygen iodine laser (COIL) used in the YAL-1A project now led by the Missile Defense Agency. A continuation of the Airborne Laser experiment is also being conducted in the form of the Advanced Tactical Laser, which is a Special Forces demonstrator project to mount a COIL system in a tactical AC-130 gunship.

Microwave technologies are being advanced for use against both electronics and personnel. One example of an anti-personnel microwave project is the "less-than-lethal" Active Denial System, which uses high-powered microwaves to penetrate less than a millimeter into the target's skin, where the nerve endings are located.

Going back as far as 1995, there were arguments that laser dazzlers could potentially cause permanent blindness in targets, and these same concerns were revived with the announcement of the PHaSR project, which is claimed to be a non-blinding laser weapon. Due to concerns that even low-powered lasers could cause blindness, the Human Rights Watch proposed that all tactical laser weapons should be scrapped and research stopped by all interested governments. The Active Denial System has also been the target of Amnesty International as well as, less directly, a United Nations special rapporteur as being a potential weapon of torture.

=== 711th Human Performance Wing ===
In March 2008, AFRL's Human Effectiveness Directorate located at Wright-Patterson AFB was merged with the Air Force School of Aerospace Medicine and the Human Performance Integration Directorate from the 311th Human Systems Wing both located at Brooks City-Base, Texas to form the 711th Human Performance Wing. In its vision statement, the wing includes the goals of improving aerospace medicine, science and technology, and human systems integration. The current Commander of the 711th is Brig. Gen. Timothy Jex.

One of the applications of the wing's work is ensuring the safety of ejection systems for pilots. According to the AFRL, anthropometry is needed on a greater scale, due to the higher amount of females joining the Air Force, and 711th Wing's body scanner is reported to enable swift, as well as accurate acquisition of anthropometric data, which could be used to design pilot equipment with a better fit for comfort and safety in the near future.

=== Information Directorate ===
The mission of the Information Directorate, located at the Rome Research Site on the Griffiss Business and Technology Park in Rome, New York, is to lead the discovery, development, and integration of affordable warfighting information technologies for air, space, and cyberspace forces. The current director of the Information Directorate is Colonel Timothy J. Lawrence.

The Information Directorate has contributed research to a number of technologies which have been deployed in the field. These projects include collaboration with other agencies in the development of ARPANET, the predecessor of the Internet, as well as technologies used in the Joint Surveillance Target Attack Radar System which is a key aspect of theater command and control for combat commanders. The Directorate also collaborated with the Department of Justice performing research on voice stress analysis technologies.

=== Materials and Manufacturing Directorate ===
The Materials and Manufacturing Directorate, located at Wright-Patterson AFB and Tyndall AFB, develops materials, processes, and advanced manufacturing technologies for aerospace systems and their components to improve Air Force capabilities in these areas. The current director is Mr. Darrell K. Phillipson.

In 1962, The Directorate began the search for high performance magnets. In 1969, Dr. Karl J. Strnat and his team had determined that a Yttrium Cobalt (YCo5) and the AFRL awarded contracts for manufacturing. This was the first Rare-earth magnet. In 2003, the Directorate announced a new manufacturing method for use producing the turbine exhaust casing for the F119 jet engine used on the F-22 Raptor stealth fighter which will result in an estimated savings of 35% of the cost while also improving the durability. In collaboration with Lockheed Martin Aeronautics, the Directorate helped develop a new laser-based ultrasonic scanner to inspect composite parts also for use on the F-22. The Directorate also developed an advanced thermoplastic composite material for use in the landing gear doors on the F-22. In 2008, the Air Force announced that the Directorate had developed a method of using fabric made of fiber optic material in a friend or foe identification system.

=== Munitions Directorate ===
The mission of the Munitions Directorate, located at Eglin AFB, Florida, is to "develop, demonstrate and transition science and technology for air-launched munitions for defeating ground fixed, mobile/relocatable, air and space targets to assure pre-eminence of U.S. air and space forces." The current director of the Munitions Directorate is Colonel Woodrow "Tony" Meeks.

Notable projects which have been made public include the GBU-28 "bunker-buster" bomb which debuted during the 1991 Persian Gulf War in Iraq and took only 17 days from concept to first deployment. The Directorate also developed the GBU-43/B Massive Ordnance Air Blast bomb which was deployed during the 2003 invasion of Iraq for Operation Iraqi Freedom and was the largest non-nuclear air-delivered munitions at that time.

=== Propulsion Directorate ===
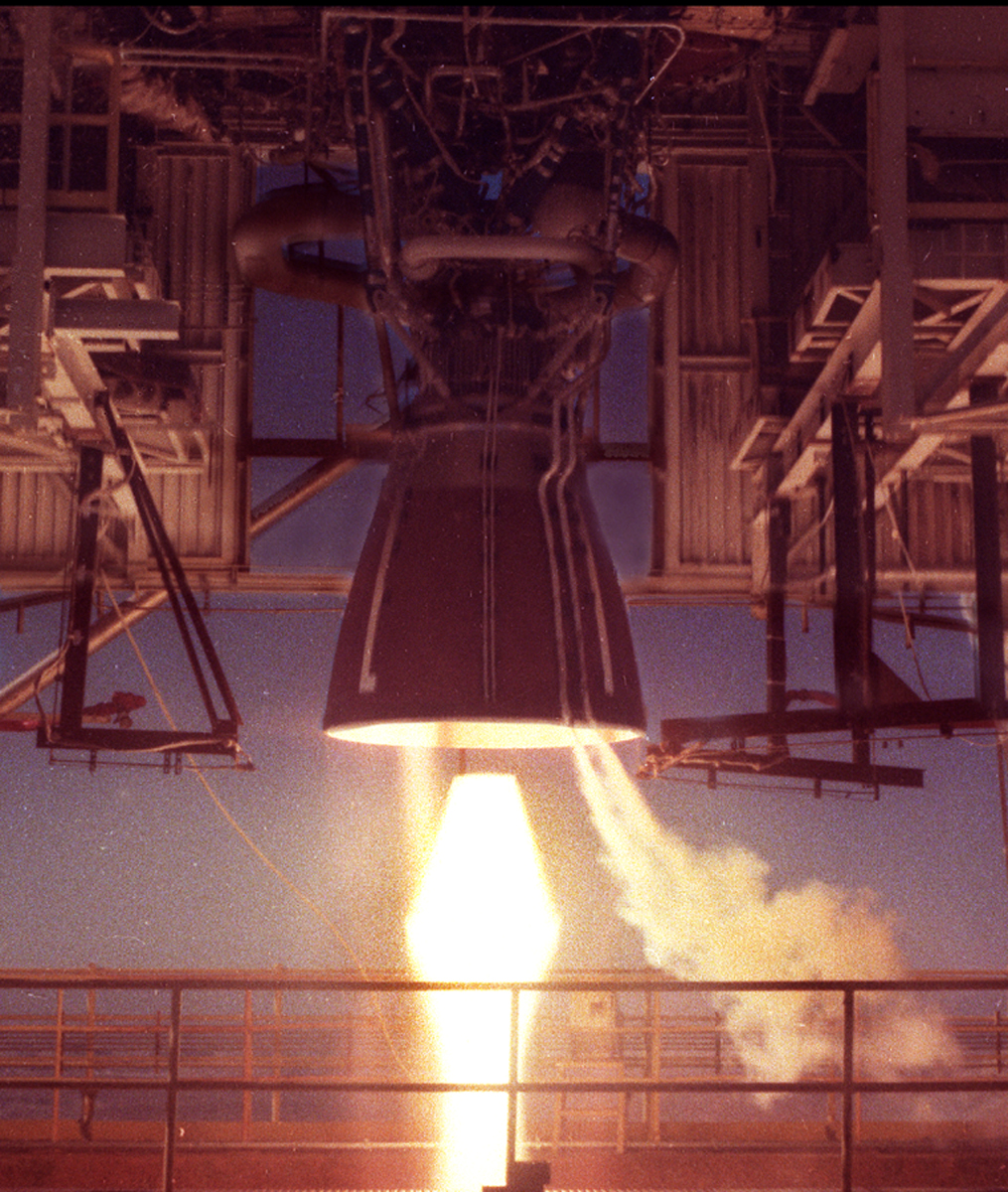
RS-68 rocket engine test firing at Edwards Air Force Base

The mission of the Propulsion Directorate, located at Wright-Patterson AFB and Edwards Air Force Base, is "to create and transition propulsion and power technology for military dominance of air and space." The current director of the Propulsion Directorate is Douglas L. Bowers.

Research areas range from experimental rocket propulsion to developing the first ever lithium-ion main aircraft battery for use in the B-2 stealth bomber. At Edwards AFB, the Directorate's test area is located east of Rogers Lake.

The Propulsion Directorate was formed through the merger of the aerospace propulsion section at Wright Laboratory and the space propulsion section at Phillips Laboratory. Each section, both before and after the merger, has played a significant role in past and present propulsion systems. Prior to the development of Project Apollo by NASA, the Air Force worked on the development and testing of the F-1 rocket engine used to power the Saturn V rocket. The facilities for testing rockets are frequently used for testing new rocket engines including the RS-68 rocket engine developed for use on the Delta IV launch vehicle. The space propulsion area also develops technologies for use in satellites on-orbit to alter their orbits. An AFRL-developed experimental Electric Propulsion Space Experiment arcjet was flown on the ARGOS satellite in 1999 as part of the Air Force Space Test Program.

The Directorate currently manages the X-51A program, which is developing a scramjet demonstration vehicle. The X-51 program is working to develop a flight demonstrator for a hypersonic cruise missile which could reach anywhere on the globe in an hour. In January 2008, the Directorate used a modified Scaled Composites Long-EZ aircraft to demonstrate that a pulse detonation engine could successfully power flight. That aircraft has now been transferred to the National Museum of the U.S. Air Force at Wright-Patterson AFB for display.

=== Sensors Directorate ===
The mission of the Sensors Directorate, located at Wright-Patterson AFB, Ohio, is to provide a full range of air and space sensors, networked to the warfighter, providing a complete and timely picture of the battlespace enabling precision targeting of the enemy and protection friendly air and space assets and its core technology areas include: radar, active and passive electro-optical targeting systems, navigation aids, automatic target recognition, sensor fusion, threat warning and threat countermeasures. As of July 9, 2021, the current director is Amanda Gentry.

The divisions formerly located at Hanscom AFB and Rome Research Site moved to Wright-Patterson AFB under the Defense Base Realignment and Closure, 2005 Commission.

The Directorate has contributed significantly to the Integrated Sensor is Structure (ISIS) project managed by DARPA which is a project to develop a missile tracking airship. In June 2008, the Air Force announced that scientists working for the Sensors Directorate had demonstrated transparent transistors. These could eventually be used to develop technologies such as "video image displays and coatings for windows, visors and windshields; electrical interconnects for future integrated multi-mode, remote sensing, focal plane arrays; high-speed microwave devices and circuits for telecommunications and radar transceivers; and semi-transparent, touch-sensitive screens for emerging multi-touch interface technologies."

=== Space Vehicles Directorate ===
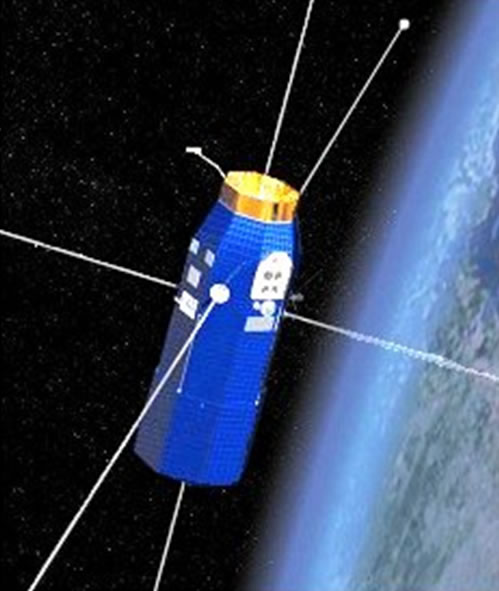
Communication/Navigation Outage Forecasting System (C/NOFS)

The mission of the Space Vehicles Directorate is to develop and transition space technologies for more effective, more affordable warfighter missions. In addition to the Directorate headquarters at Kirtland AFB, New Mexico and an additional research facility at Hanscom AFB, Massachusetts, the High Frequency Active Auroral Research Program (HAARP) located near Gakona, Alaska is also jointly operated by the Space Vehicles Directorate as well as DARPA, the Office of Naval Research (ONR), the Naval Research Laboratory (NRL) and universities to conduct ionospheric research. The current director is Col David Goldstein. The Battlespace Environment Division formerly located at Hanscom AFB moved to a new Research lab facility at Kirtland AFB in 2011–2012 as directed under the Defense Base Realignment and Closure, 2005 Commission.

The IBM RAD6000 radiation hardened single board computer, now produced by BAE Systems, was initially developed in a collaboration with the Space Electronics and Protection Branch and IBM Federal Systems and is now used on nearly 200 satellites and robotic spacecraft, including on the twin Mars Exploration Rovers—Spirit and Opportunity. In November 2005, the AFRL XSS-11 satellite demonstrator received Popular Science's "Best of What's New" award in the Aviation and Space category. The Space Vehicles Directorate is also a leading collaborator in the Department of Defense Operationally Responsive Space Office's Tactical Satellite Program and served as program manager for the development of TacSat-2, TacSat-3, and is current program manager for the development of TacSat-5. They also have contributed experimental sensors to TacSat-4 which is managed by the NRL's Center for Space Technology.

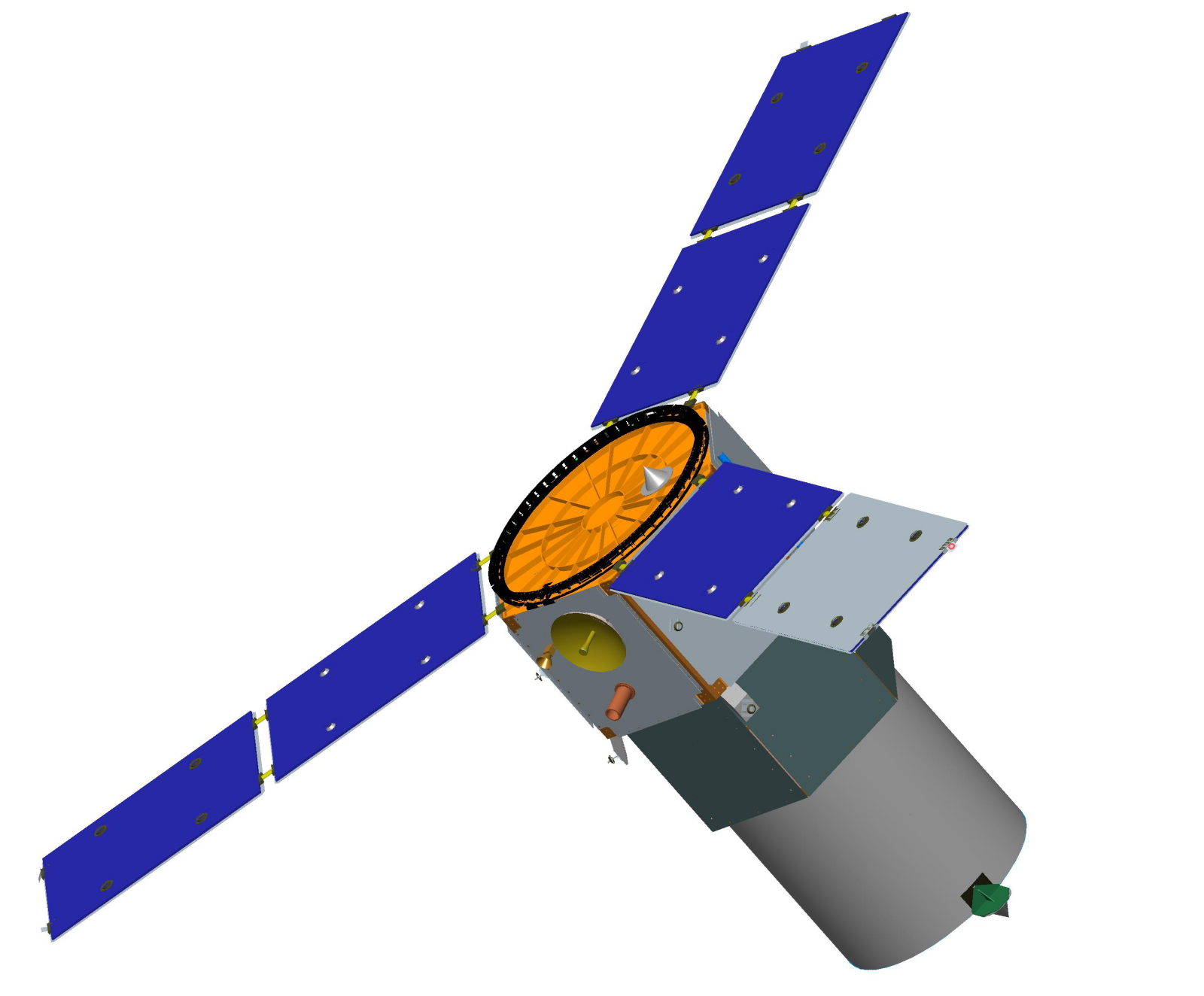
TacSat-3 computer model

The University Nanosatellite Program, a satellite design and fabrication competition for universities jointly administered by the American Institute of Aeronautics and Astronautics (AIAA), AFOSR, AFRL, and the Space Development and Test Wing, is also managed by the Space Vehicles Directorate's Spacecraft Technology division. The fourth iteration of the competition was completed in March 2007 with the selection of Cornell University's CUSat as the winner. Previous winners of the competition were University of Texas at Austin's Formation Autonomy Spacecraft with Thrust, Relnav, Attitude, and Crosslink (FASTRAC) for Nanosat-3 and the joint 3 Corner Satellite (3CS) project by the University of Colorado at Boulder, Arizona State University and New Mexico State University for Nanosat-2. As of July 2008, only the 3CS spacecraft has launched, however FASTRAC has a launch tentatively scheduled for December 2009.

The Space University Research Initiative (SURI) is a collaborative research program sponsored by the Air Force Office of Scientific Research (AFOSR) and the AFRL Chief Technologist Office to foster engagement among the Department of Defense, academia, and the aerospace industry. The initiative supports multidisciplinary basic and applied research to transition critical aerospace concepts into advanced technologies. The program and its initial consortium awards were officially announced on December 17, 2021. The inaugural SURI project, aimed at breaking the traditional "launch once, use once" paradigm through on-orbit servicing, assembly, and manufacturing (OSAM), was awarded to a consortium managed by Carnegie Mellon University, Texas A&M University, the University of New Mexico, and Northrop Grumman Corporation. As the first team to manage this initiative, these organizations play an essential role in developing systems for the intelligent inspection and maintenance of space assets. Within this partnership, University of New Mexico serves a core operational role in advanced robotics manipulation, utilizing smart algorithms developed by its PhD research team to enable complex robotic interactions with non-rigid satellites in orbit. By enabling the repair and upgrading of existing infrastructure, these technologies are designed to significantly prolong the operational lifespan of U.S. space devices, yielding multi-million-dollar cost savings by reducing the need for replacement launches. Furthermore, this research accelerates both domestic and global space development by establishing foundational capabilities for sustainable space operations. The program's advancements in autonomous robotics also contribute to broader terrestrial safety efforts by offering viable methodologies for active space debris mitigation and the management of orbital hazards, thereby supporting the long-term security and viability of space environments for humanity.

The Directorate has indirectly faced significant controversy over the HAARP project. While the project claims to be developed only for studying the effects of ionospheric disruption on communications, navigation, and power systems, many suspect it of being developed as a prototype for a "Star Wars" type of weapon system. Still others are more concerned with the environmental impact to migratory birds of beaming thousands of watts of power into the atmosphere.

In 2020, the Space Vehicles Directorate announced the creation of a new Deployable Structures Laboratory (DeSel) focused on developing high-strength materials and satellite structures at Kirtland Air Force Base.

== List of commanders ==
- Maj Gen Ellen M. Pawlikowski, February 2010 – May 2011.
- Maj Gen William N. McCasland, May 2011 – July 2013.
- Maj Gen Thomas J. Masiello, July 2013 – May 2016.
- Maj Gen Robert D. McMurry Jr., May 2016 – May 2017.
- Maj Gen William T. Cooley, May 2017 – January 2020.
- Brig Gen Evan Dertien, January 2020 – June 2020.
- Maj Gen Heather L. Pringle, June 2020 – June 2023
- Maj Gen Scott A. Cain, June 2023 – July 2024
- Brig Gen Jason E. Bartolomei, July 2024 – June 2026
- Brig Gen Douglas P. Wickert, June 2026 – Present

== See also ==
- DARPA
- List of Ig Nobel Prize winners
- Marine Corps Combat Development Command
- Office of Naval Research
- Sentient (intelligence analysis system)
- United States Army Research Laboratory
- United States Marine Corps Warfighting Laboratory
- United States Naval Research Laboratory
