= Tactical Satellite Program =

US Air Force series of satellites

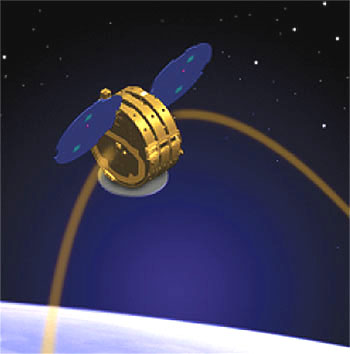
TacSat-1 satellite

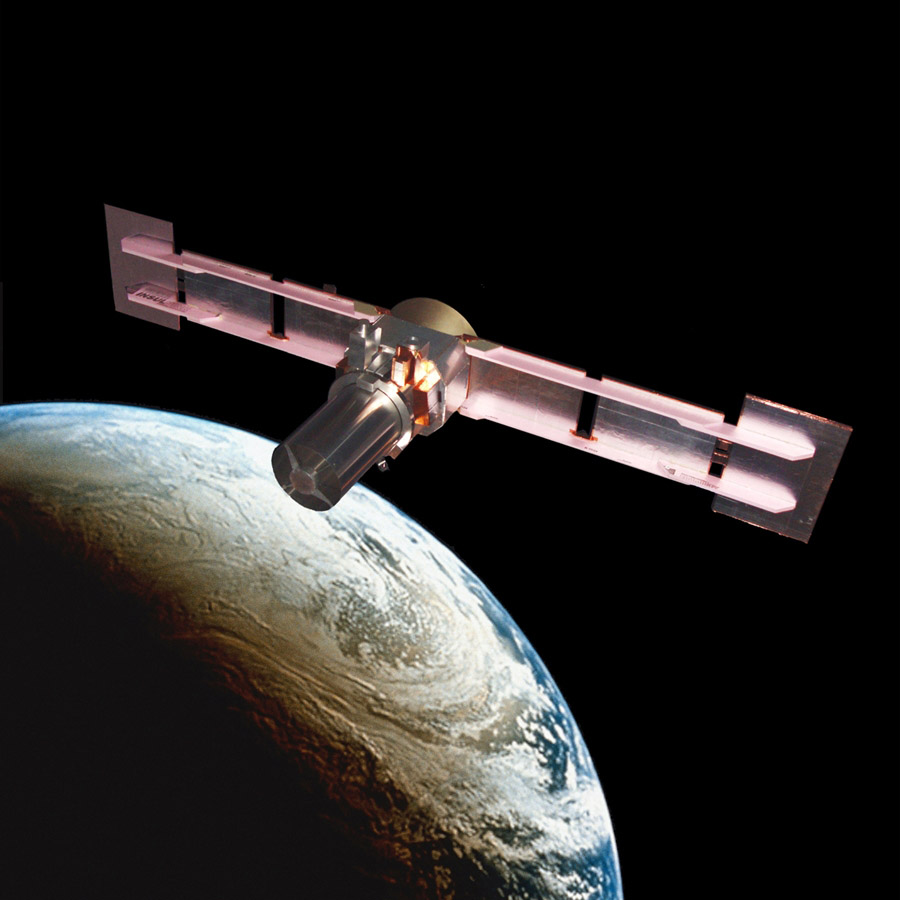
TacSat-2

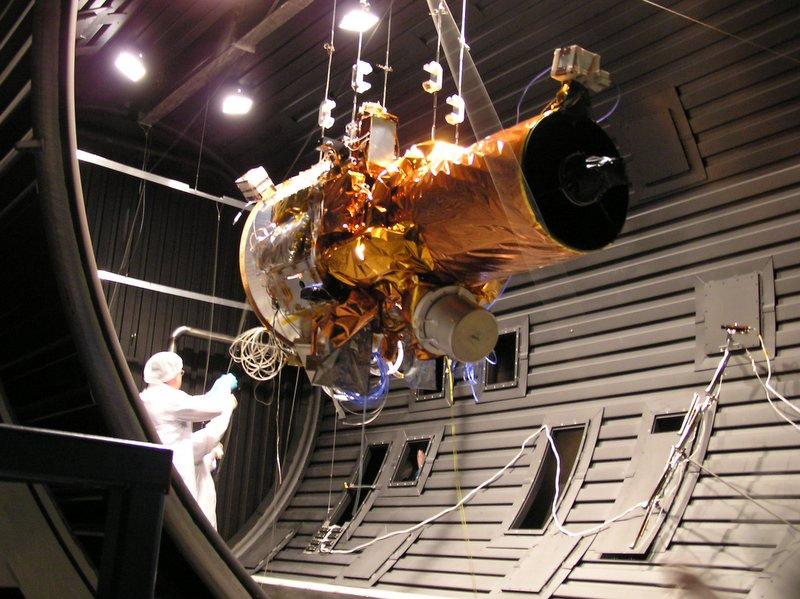
TacSat-2 in May 2006

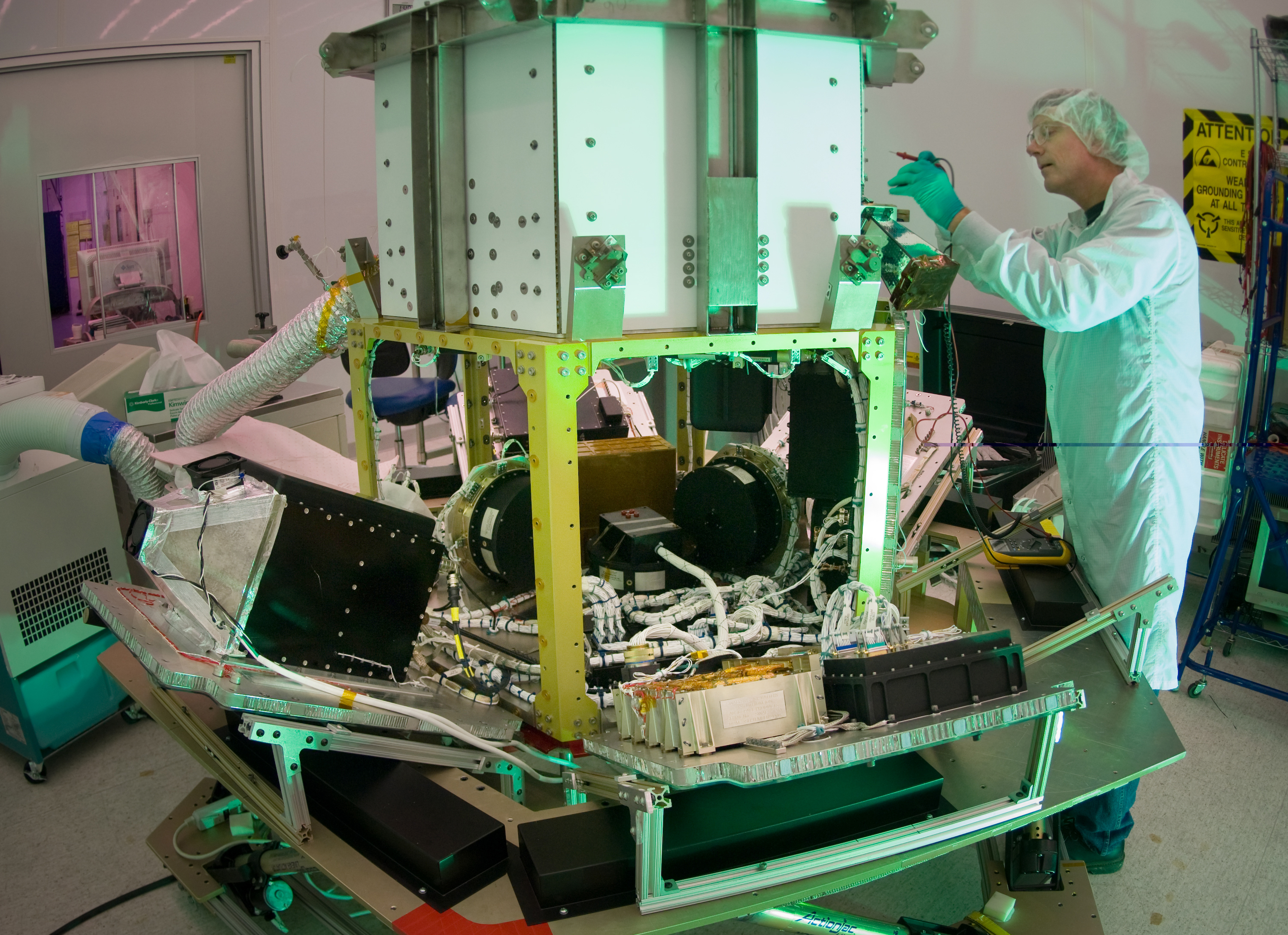
TacSat-3 during construction

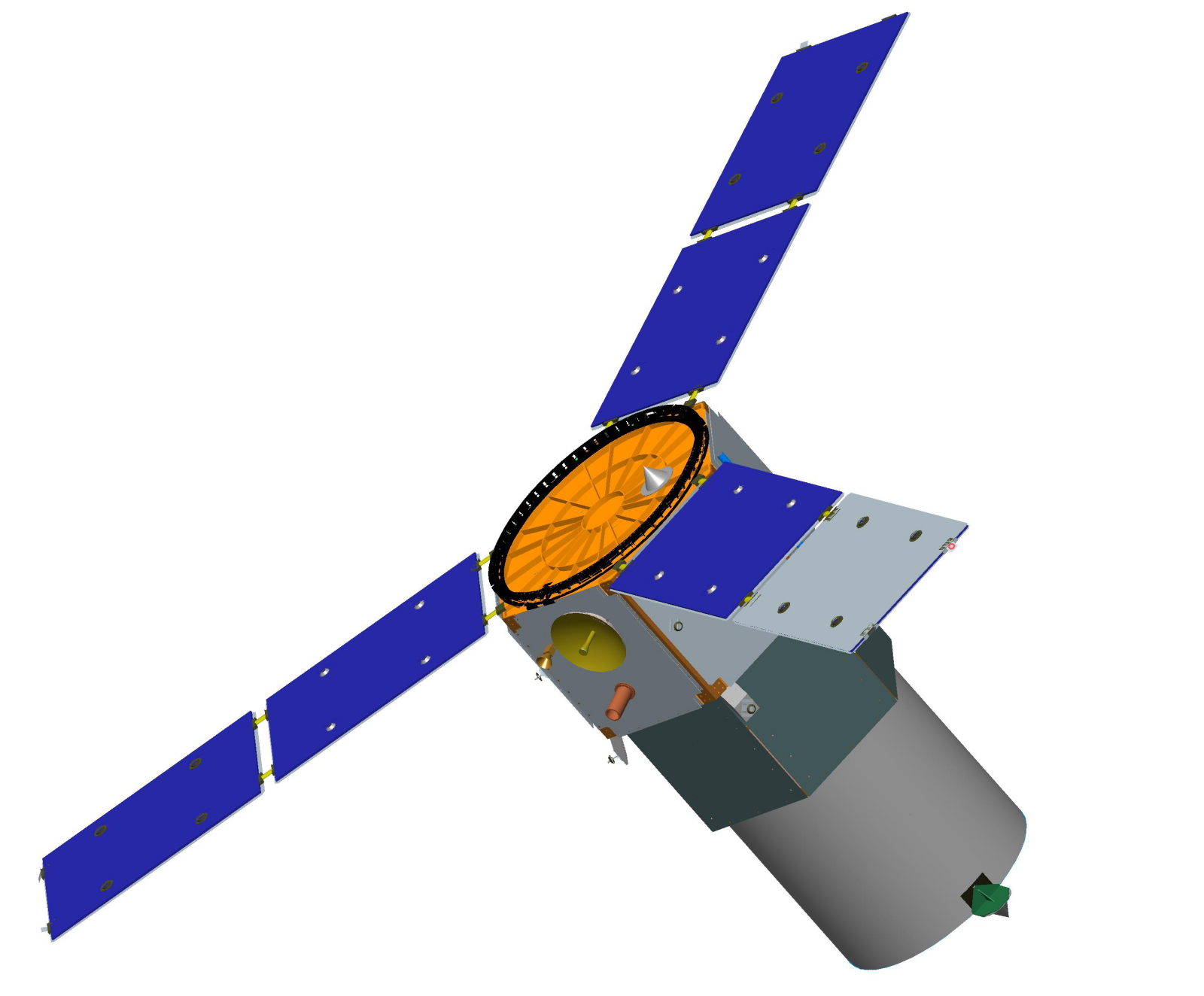
TacSat-3

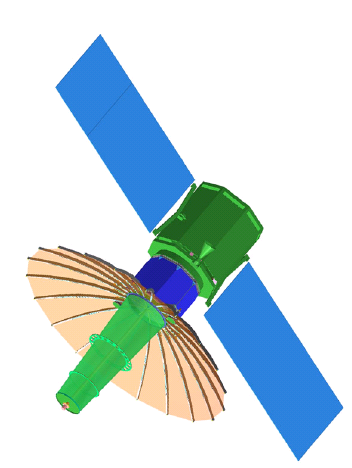
TacSat-4

During the second half of 2002, the Naval Research Laboratory studied the tactical application of space assets. Relatively new technologies and processes in the areas of microsatellites, affordable and quick-response launch vehicles, and the classified SIPRNet (Secret Internet Protocol Router Network) made tactical use of space assets possible in the relatively near term. The DoD's Office of Force Transformation (OFT) agreed with the core findings of the study and decided to start an Operationally Responsive Space (ORS) Initiative consisting of a series of experiments. TacSat-1 is the first experiment in this OFT initiative. The TacSat-1 experiment received go-ahead on 7 May 2003.

The TacSat series of experimental spacecraft are designed to allow military commanders on a battlefield to request and obtain imagery and other data from a satellite as it passes overhead. Collected data will be delivered to field commanders in minutes rather than hours or days.

All TacSats have been launched on Minotaur launch vehicles.

These series of spacecraft should not be confused with the TACSAT program in 1969.

- TacSat-1 - Cancelled
- TacSat-2 - Launched 16 December 2006
- TacSat-3 - Launched 19 May 2009
- TacSat-4 - Launched 27 September 2011
- TacSat-5 - Conceptual
- TacSat-6 - Launched on 6 December 2013
