= CINDI =

NASA mission aboard the C/NOFS satellite

CINDI, or the Coupled Ion-Neutral Dynamics Investigation is a NASA mission of opportunity payload aboard the C/NOFS satellite. Mission of opportunity is part of the Explorer program.

Its host spacecraft re-entered the Earth's atmosphere in November 2015.

== See also ==
- List of heliophysics missions
