= TacSat-6 =

American communications satellite

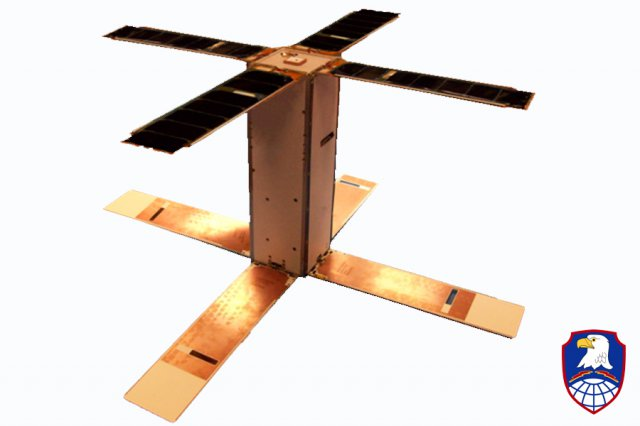
- Mission type: Technology, Communications
- Operator: Operationally Responsive Space Office, SMDC
- COSPAR ID: 2013-072M
- SATCAT no.: 39473

Spacecraft properties
- Spacecraft: TacSat-6
- Bus: 3U CubeSat
- Manufacturer: United States Army Space and Missile Defense Command (SMDC)
- Launch mass: 5 kg (11 lb)

Start of mission
- Launch date: 6 December 2013, 07:14:30 UTC
- Rocket: Atlas V 501 (AV-042)
- Launch site: Vandenberg, SLC-3E
- Contractor: United Launch Alliance

Orbital parameters
- Reference system: Geocentric orbit
- Regime: Low Earth orbit
- Perigee altitude: 462 km (287 mi)
- Apogee altitude: 889 km (552 mi)
- Inclination: 120.50°
- Period: 90.0 minutes

TacSat-6 is a U.S. military experimental technology and communication satellite. The Operationally Responsive Space Office (ORS) funded the launch that was performed by the United States Army Space and Missile Defense Command (SMDC).

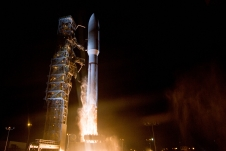
Launch of TacSat-6 on Dec. 5, 2013, aboard a Atlas V rocket.

The spacecraft was launched on 6 December 2013, at 07:14:30 UTC, on an Atlas V 501 launch vehicle from Vandenberg Air Force Base, SLC-3E.

== Mission ==
TacSat-6 is equipped that can be used for any combination of communications. Part of its capability is rapid (within 24 hours) reallocation to different theaters worldwide, in support of unexpected operations. Command and control of TacSat-6 is performed by the United States Army Space and Missile Defense Command (SMDC).

== Design ==
All TacSat satellites are designed to demonstrate the ability to provide real-time data collected from space to combatant commanders in the field.

The spacecraft bus was built by United States Army Space and Missile Defense Command (SMDC).
