= TacSat-5 =

- Mission type: Technology
- Operator: AFRL

Start of mission
- Launch date: TBD

Orbital parameters
- Reference system: Geocentric

TacSat-5 is a planned fifth satellite in a series of U.S. military reconnaissance satellites. The project will be managed by the Air Force Research Laboratory in cooperation with the Operationally Responsive Space Office of the Department of Defense. The TacSat satellites are all designed to demonstrate the ability to provide real-time data collected from space to combatant commanders in the field.

In January 2009, AFRL released a Broad Agency Announcement for the development of TacSat-5. At that time, the mission still had not been specified and the bus was to be developed based on AFRL's Plug-and-Play avionics standards.
