= C/NOFS =

U.S. Air Force communications outage prediction satellite (2008–2015)

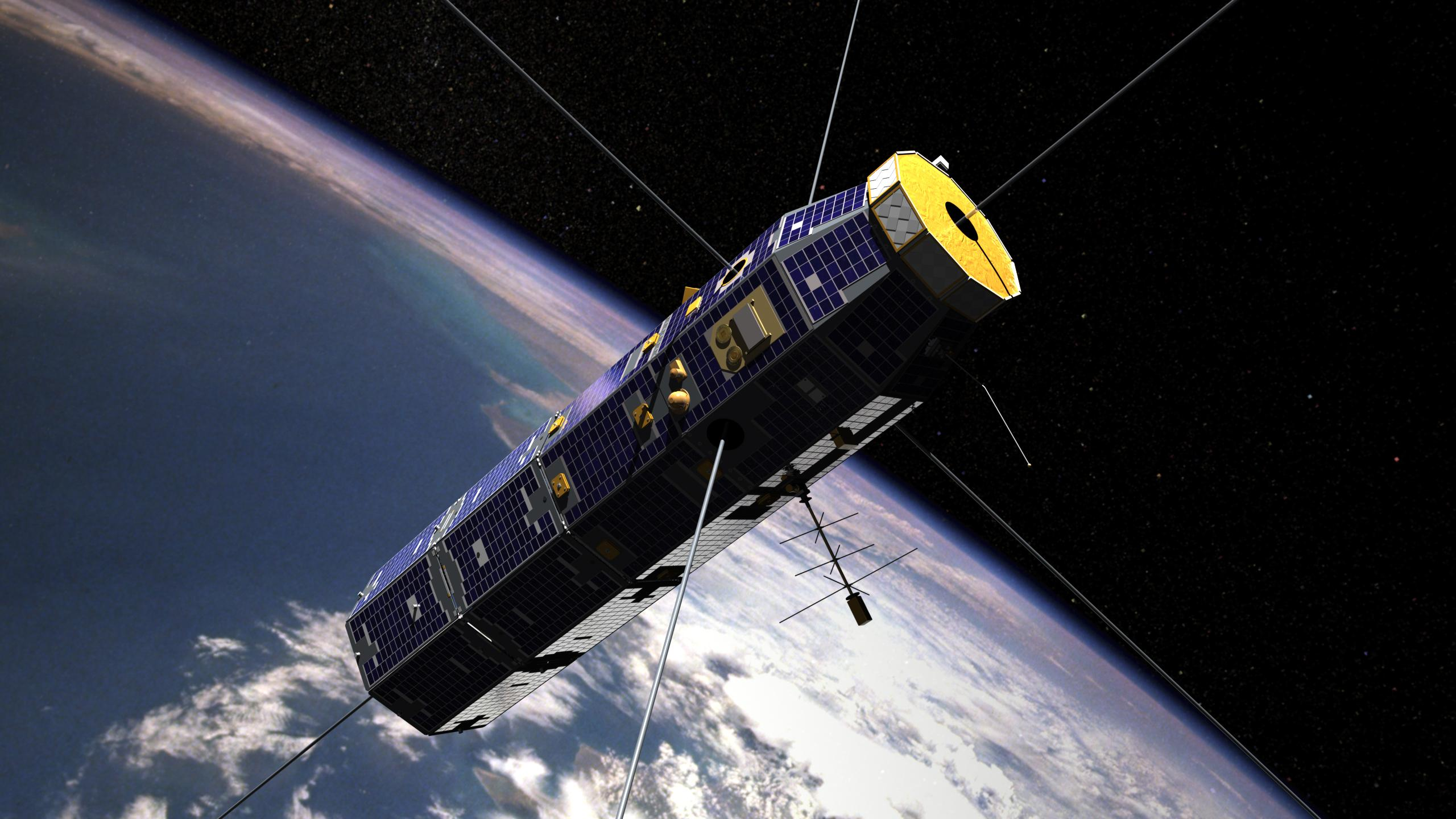
- An artist's concept of C/NOFS satellite
- Names: Communications/Navigation Outage Forecasting System
- Mission type: Technology demonstration
- Operator: STP / AFRL
- COSPAR ID: 2008-017A
- SATCAT no.: 32765
- Mission duration: 3 years (planned); 7.5 years (achieved)

Spacecraft properties
- Manufacturer: General Dynamics
- Launch mass: 384 kg (847 lb)

Start of mission
- Launch date: 16 April 2008, 17:02:48 UTC
- Rocket: Pegasus-XL (F39)
- Launch site: Bucholz, Stargazer, Runway 6/24
- Contractor: Orbital Sciences Corporation

End of mission
- Decay date: 28 November 2015

Orbital parameters
- Reference system: Geocentric orbit
- Regime: Low Earth orbit
- Perigee altitude: 405 km (252 mi)
- Apogee altitude: 853 km (530 mi)
- Inclination: 13.00°
- Period: 97.30 minutes

Instruments
- C/NOFS Occultation Receiver for Ionospheric Sensing and Specification (CORISS); Coherent Electromagnetic Radio Tomography (CERTO); Coupled Ion-Neutral Dynamics Investigation (CINDI); Planar Langmuir Probe (PLP); Vector Electric Field Instrument (VEFI)

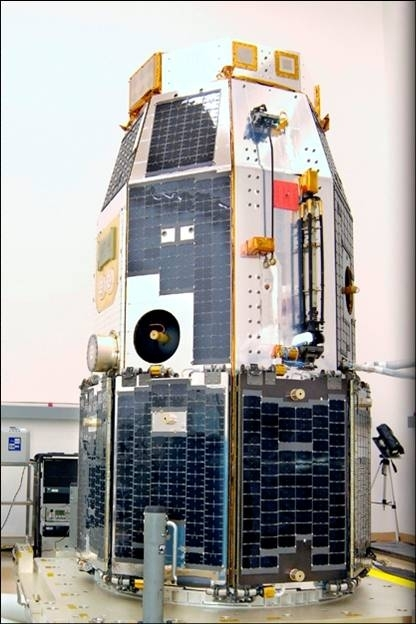
Communication/Navigation Outage Forecasting System (C/NOFS) satellite

C/NOFS, or Communications/Navigation Outage Forecasting System was a USAF satellite developed by the Air Force Research Laboratory (AFRL) Space Vehicles Directorate to investigate and forecast scintillations in the Earth's ionosphere. It was launched by an Orbital Sciences Corporation Pegasus-XL launch vehicle at 17:02:48 UTC on 16 April 2008 and decayed on 28 November 2015.

The satellite, which was operated by the Space Test Program (STP), allowed the U.S. military to predict the effects of ionospheric activity on signals from communication and navigation satellites, outages of which could potentially cause problems in battlefield situations.

C/NOFS had a three-axis stabilization system equipped with seven sensors. It was placed into low Earth orbit with an orbital inclination of 13.00°, a perigee of 405 km (252 mi) and an apogee of 853 km (530 mi). It carried the CINDI experiment for NASA. Launch had been scheduled for 2003, but was delayed for a number of reasons.

== Scientific instruments on board ==
The spacecraft payload consists of the following instruments:

- CERTO: the Coherent Electromagnetic Radio Tomography experiment is a radio beacon that will provide plasma density profiles and information on phase and amplitude scintillation of radio signals. CERTO is provided by the Naval Research Laboratory (NRL). Principal investigator: Paul Bernhardt.
- CORISS: the C/NOFS Occultation Receiver for Ionospheric Sensing and Specification (CORISS) instrument is a GPS dual-frequency receiver designed to measure line-of-sight TEC. CORISS is provided by The Aerospace Corporation. Principal investigator: Paul Straus.
- Ion Velocity Meter (IVM): consists of a pair of sensors designed to measure the in situ ion velocity vector, ion temperature, and ion composition. The IVM is provided by the William B. Hanson Center for Space Sciences at the University of Texas at Dallas. IVM is a component of the CINDI package funded by NASA. Principal investigator: Dr. Roderick A. Heelis.
- Neutral Wind Meter (NWM): a two sensor package designed to measure the neutral wind velocity. NWM is provided by the William B. Hanson Center for Space Sciences at the University of Texas at Dallas. Like IVM, NWM is a component of the CINDI package funded by NASA. Principal investigator: Greg Earle.
- Ram Wind Sensor (RWS): measures the ram component of the neutral wind by ionizing a fraction of the incoming neutral gas then performing retarding potential analysis on those ions.
- Cross Track Sensor (CTS): is a hollow hemispherical dome divided into four independent chambers with a miniaturized Bayard-Alpert hot filament ionization gauge in each chamber. Four small holes in the dome allow the neutral gas to stream into the chambers. The pressure in any chamber will depend on the arrival angle of the neutral wind.
- Planar Langmuir Probe (PLP): a two sensor package consisting an ion trap designed to measure ion density fluctuations and a Langmuir probe. PLP is provided by the Air Force Research Laboratory. Principal investigator: Patrick Roddy, formerly Donald Hunton.
- Vector Electric Field Instrument (VEFI): is a collection of instruments including 6 electric field booms, a 3-axis magnetometer, a spherical Langmuir probe, and a lightning detector. VEFI is provided by NASA Goddard Space Flight Center (GSFC) with funding from the Air Force Research Laboratory. Principal investigator: Dr. Robert F. Pfaff.

== Experiments ==
=== C/NOFS Occultation Receiver for Ionospheric Sensing and Specification (CORISS) ===
The C/NOFS Occultation Receiver for Ionospheric Sensing and Specification (CORISS) is a Global Positioning System (GPS) dual-frequency receiver that measures the total electron content (TEC) along the line-of-sight from C/NOFS to GPS satellite. TEC measurement can help to constrain C/NOFS ionospheric models. Limb profiles of TEC obtained during occultations can be inverted to produce vertical profiles of electron density. It may be also possible to measure L-band scintillations caused by electron density irregularities.

=== Coherent Electromagnetic Radio Tomography (CERTO) ===
The Coherent Electromagnetic Radio Tomography (CERTO) is a tri-band (150, 400, 1067 MHz) radio beacon that permits direct measurement of ionospheric scintillation parameters at several frequencies by ground receivers. CERTO measurements can also be used for tomographic reconstruction of electron density profiles.

=== Coupled Ion-Neutral Dynamics Investigation (CINDI) ===
The Coupled Ion-Neutral Dynamics Investigation (CINDI) payload is funded by NASA as an Explorer Mission of Opportunity. CINDI consists of two instruments: the Ion Velocity Meter (IVM) and the Neutral Wind Meter (NWM). The IVM instrument includes an ion drift meter and a retarding potential analyzer. IVM measure the ion drift vector, the ion temperature, and the major ion composition with a spatial resolution of about 4 km (2.5 mi) along the satellite track; the ion drift meter also provides vertical and horizontal ion drift components at 500 m (1,600 ft) resolution. The NWM consists of a cross track wind sensor and a ram wind sensor providing a direct measure of the neutral wind vector with a spatial resolution of about 8 km (5.0 mi) along the satellite track.

=== Planar Langmuir Probe (PLP) ===
The Planar Langmuir Probe (PLP) is a dual-disk probe designed to provide in situ measurements of plasma density and density fluctuations. Low time-resolution density measurements are intended as inputs for background ionosphere models and high time-resolution density irregularity measurements to specify disturbance conditions. PLP also monitors the spacecraft surface potential.

=== Vector Electric Field Instrument (VEFI) ===
The Vector Electric Field Instrument (VEFI) consists primarily of three orthogonal 20 m (66 ft) tip-to-tip double probe antennas. It measures the alternating current (AC) and Direct current (DC) electric fields related to plasma drift and irregularity development. The VEFI instrument package also includes a fluxgate magnetometer, an optical lightning detector and a fixed-bias Langmuir probe.

== Scientific data ==
C/NOFS science data is available online for general use. VEFI and PLP data are available through NASA Goddard's Coordinated Data Analysis Web. CINDI data are available through the William B. Hanson Center for Space Science at the University of Texas at Dallas.

== Timeline ==
- 2008, 28 May: the USAF Space Development and Test Wing announced the launch and early orbit of the spacecraft had been completed successfully. On 9 June 2008, the manufacturer of the separation systems used to deploy the C/NOFS solar panels, payload antennas and magnetometer boom reported that they had all functioned correctly.
- 2011, 9 September: SMC announced that it had extended the C/NOFS satellite maintenance contract from 1 October 2011 to 31 March 2012 to Orbital Sciences Corporation for the continued on-orbit support of the C/NOFS mission.
- 2013, 3 June: the C/NOFS satellite was placed in safe mode, with all scientific instruments turned off, due to budgetary restrictions.
- 2013, 21 October: the C/NOFS satellite was removed from safe mode and operating nominally.
- 2015, 28 November: C/NOFS executed a planned reentry and burned in the atmosphere.

== C/NOFS related publications ==
- "A new satellite-borne neutral wind instrument for thermospheric diagnostics", Earle et al., Review of Scientific Instruments 78, 114051 (2007)
- "C/NOFS: a mission to forecast scintillations", O. de La Beaujardiere, Journal of Atmospheric and Solar-Terrestrial Physics, 66 (2004) 1573–1591
- "Behavior of the O+/H+ transition height during the extreme solar minimum of 2008", Heelis et al., Geophysical Research Letters, doi:10.1029/2009GL038652 (2009)
- "Broad Plasma Decreases in the Equatorial Ionosphere", Huang et al., Geophysical Research Letters, doi:10.1029/2009GL039423 (2009)
- "Comparing F region ionospheric irregularity observations from C/NOFS and Jicamarca", Hysell et al., Geophysical Research Letters, doi:10.1029/2009GL038983 (2009)
- "C/NOFS observations of intermediate and transitional scale-size equatorial spread F irregularities", Rodrigues et al., Geophysical Research Letters, doi:10.1029/2009GL038905 (2009)
- "Assimilative modeling of equatorial plasma depletions observed by C/NOFS", Su et al., Geophysical Research Letters, doi:10.1029/2009GL038946 (2009)
- "Longitudinal and seasonal dependence of nighttime equatorial plasma density irregularities during solar minimum detected on the C/NOFS satellite", Dao et al., Geophysical Research Letters, doi:10.1029/2011GL047046 (2011)
- "Assimilative modeling of observed post-midnight equatorial plasma depletions in June 2008", Su et al., Journal of Geophysical Research, doi:10.1029/2011JA016772 (2011)
- "Multiple phase screen modeling of ionospheric scintillation along radio occultation raypaths", Carrano et al., Radio Science, doi:10.1029/2010RS004591 (2011)

== See also ==
- Explorer program
- Coherent electromagnetic radio tomography
