= Space Development and Test Wing =

Coordinates: 35°3′17.1″N 106°35′56.1″W

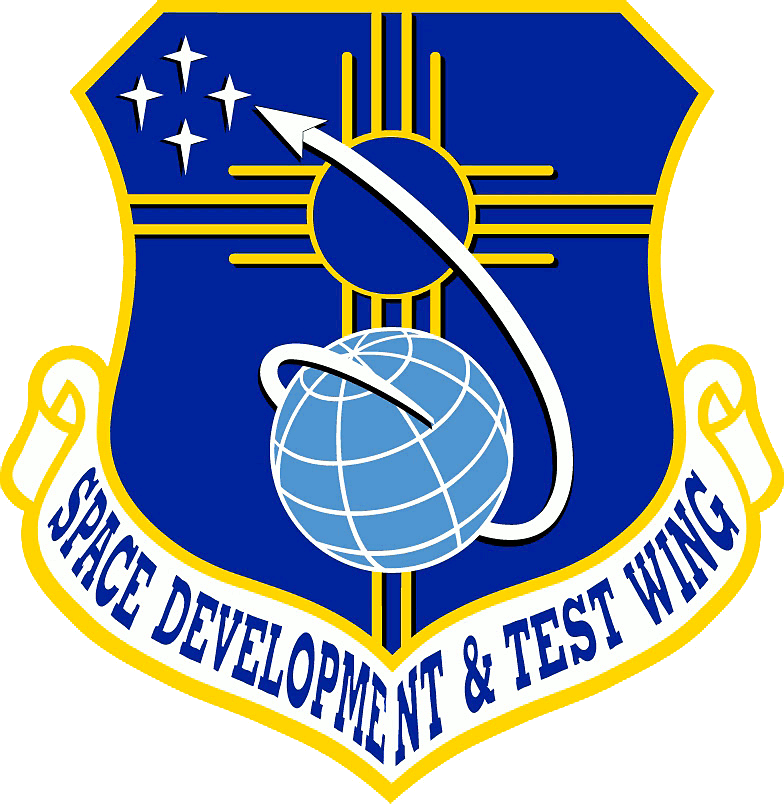
- Emblem of the SDTW
- Active: August 2006-present
- Country: United States
- Branch: Air Force
- Type: Space system test and evaluation
- Size: 219 military 345 contractor
- Part of: Air Force Space Command
- Garrison/HQ: Kirtland Air Force Base
- Decorations: AFOEA

Commanders
- Commander: Col Burke E. Wilson

The Space Development and Test Wing (SDTW) was a unit of Air Force Space Command's Space and Missile Systems Center of the United States Air Force. The wing is located at Kirtland Air Force Base in Albuquerque, New Mexico.

The unit was combined with another Space and Missile Systems Center directorate and is now known as the Advanced Systems and Development Directorate.

== Mission ==
The Space Development and Test Directorate develops, tests and evaluates Air Force space systems, executes advanced space development and demonstration projects, and rapidly transitions capabilities to the warfighter.

== History ==
The Space Development and Test Wing was activated 1 August 2006. Prior to that, Detachment 12 of the Space and Missile Systems Center had been activated at Kirtland AFB 29 June 2001, taking responsibility for research, developmental test and evaluation organizations that had been co-located at Kirtland AFB alongside the Air Force Research Laboratory Space Vehicles and Directed Energy Directorates.

- Lineage
  - Detachment 2, Space and Missile Systems Center, Onizuka AS, CA
  - SMC, Test and Evaluation Directorate, Kirtland AFB, NM
  - Detachment 12, Space and Missile Systems Center, Kirtland AFB, NM (activated 29 June 2001)
  - Space Development and Test Wing, Kirtland AFB, NM (activated 1 Aug 2006)
  - Advanced Systems and Development Directorate, Kirtland AFB, NM
- Past Directors and Commanders
  - Craig Martin, Colonel, USAF (retired)
  - James Ford, Colonel, USAF (retired)
  - Ralph Monfort, Colonel, USAF (retired)

== Units ==
The Space Development and Test Wing is divided into two Groups, the Space Development Group and the Space Test Group.

- Space Development Group
  - Responsive Space Squadron
  - Responsive Satellite Command and Control Division
  - Human Spaceflight Payloads Division - Houston, TX
- Space Test Group
  - Space Test Squadron
    - SOC 96 - Schriever AFB
    - SOC 97 - Kirtland AFB
  - Space Test Operations Squadron
  - Launch Test Squadron

== See also ==
- Space Test Program
- Space and Missile Systems Center
- C/NOFS
- STP-S26
- Vandenberg AFB Launch Schedule
