= TacSat-4 =

US defense satellite

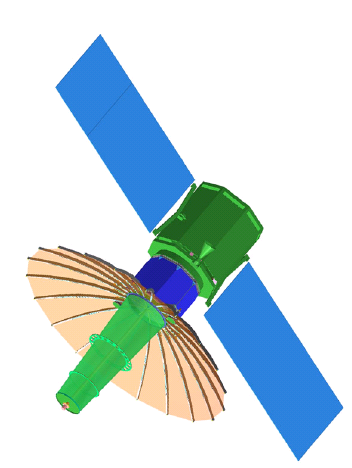
- Computer model of TacSat-4
- Names: JSW 1 COMMx; Tactical Microsatellite Innovative Naval Prototype (INP)
- Mission type: Technology, Communications
- Operator: Naval Research Laboratory (NRL); Applied Physics Laboratory (APL); Air Force Research Laboratory (AFRL)
- COSPAR ID: 2011-052A
- SATCAT no.: 37818
- Mission duration: 2 years (planned)

Spacecraft properties
- Spacecraft: TacSat-4
- Spacecraft type: TacSat
- Bus: JSW bus
- Manufacturer: Naval Research Laboratory (bus and payload); Applied Physics Laboratory (bus)
- Launch mass: 468 kg (1,032 lb)
- Power: 1 kW

Start of mission
- Launch date: 27 September 2011, 15:49:00 UTC
- Rocket: Minotaur IV+
- Launch site: Kodiak Launch Complex, LP-1
- Contractor: Orbital Sciences Corporation (OSC)

Orbital parameters
- Reference system: Geocentric orbit
- Regime: Low Earth orbit
- Perigee altitude: 472 km (293 mi)
- Apogee altitude: 12,291 km (7,637 mi)
- Inclination: 63.1°
- Period: 238.9 minutes

TacSat-4 is the third in a series of U.S. military experimental technology and communication satellites. The United States Naval Research Laboratory (NRL) is the program manager. The Office of Naval Research (ONR) sponsored the development of the payload and funded the first year of operations. The Office of the Director of Defense Research and Engineering (DDR&E) funded the standardized spacecraft bus and the Operationally Responsive Space Office (ORS) funded the launch that will be performed by the Air Force's Space and Missile Systems Center (SMC).

The spacecraft was completed by the end of 2009, and was launched on 27 September 2011, at 14:49:00 UTC, on a Minotaur IV launch vehicle into a highly elliptical orbit (HEO).

== Mission ==
TacSat-4 is equipped with a 3.6 m (12 ft) antenna operating 10 Ultra High Frequency (UHF) channels that can be used for any combination of communications, data ex-filtration or Blue Force Tracking (BFT). TacSat-4 will fly the highly elliptical, 4-hour, orbit (12,050 kilometers at peak) providing typical payload communication periods of two hours per orbit. TacSat-4's orbit also allows it to cover the high latitudes.

Part of its capability is rapid (within 24 hours) reallocation to different theaters worldwide, in support of unexpected operations. Command and control of TacSat-4 will be performed at the United States Naval Research Laboratory (NRL) Satellite Operations Center at Blossom Point, Maryland. Payload tasking will be performed via the SIPRNet based Virtual Mission Operations Center (VMOC).

== Design ==
All TacSat satellites are designed to demonstrate the ability to provide real-time data collected from space to combatant commanders in the field.

The spacecraft bus was built by NRL and Johns Hopkins University Applied Physics Laboratory (APL) to mature ORS bus standards developed by an Integrated (government and industry) System Engineering Team, the "ISET Team", with active representation from AeroAstro, Air Force Research Laboratory, Johns Hopkins University Applied Physics Laboratory, ATK Space, Ball Aerospace & Technologies, Boeing, Design Net Engineering, General Dynamics AIS, Microcosm, Sierra Nevada Corp., Massachusetts Institute of Technology, Lincoln Laboratory, Orbital Sciences Corporation, NRL, SMC, Space Systems/Loral, and Raytheon. Lithium-ion battery power provided by Quallion.

== Gallery ==
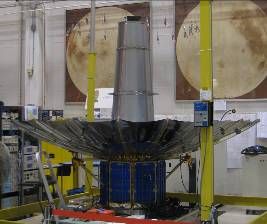
TacSat-4 with deployed UHF antenna

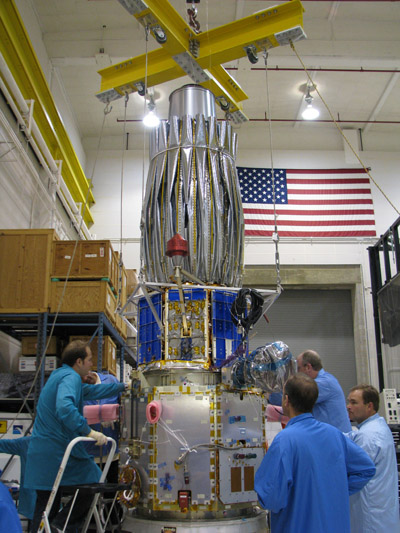
TacSat-4 at Naval Research Lab

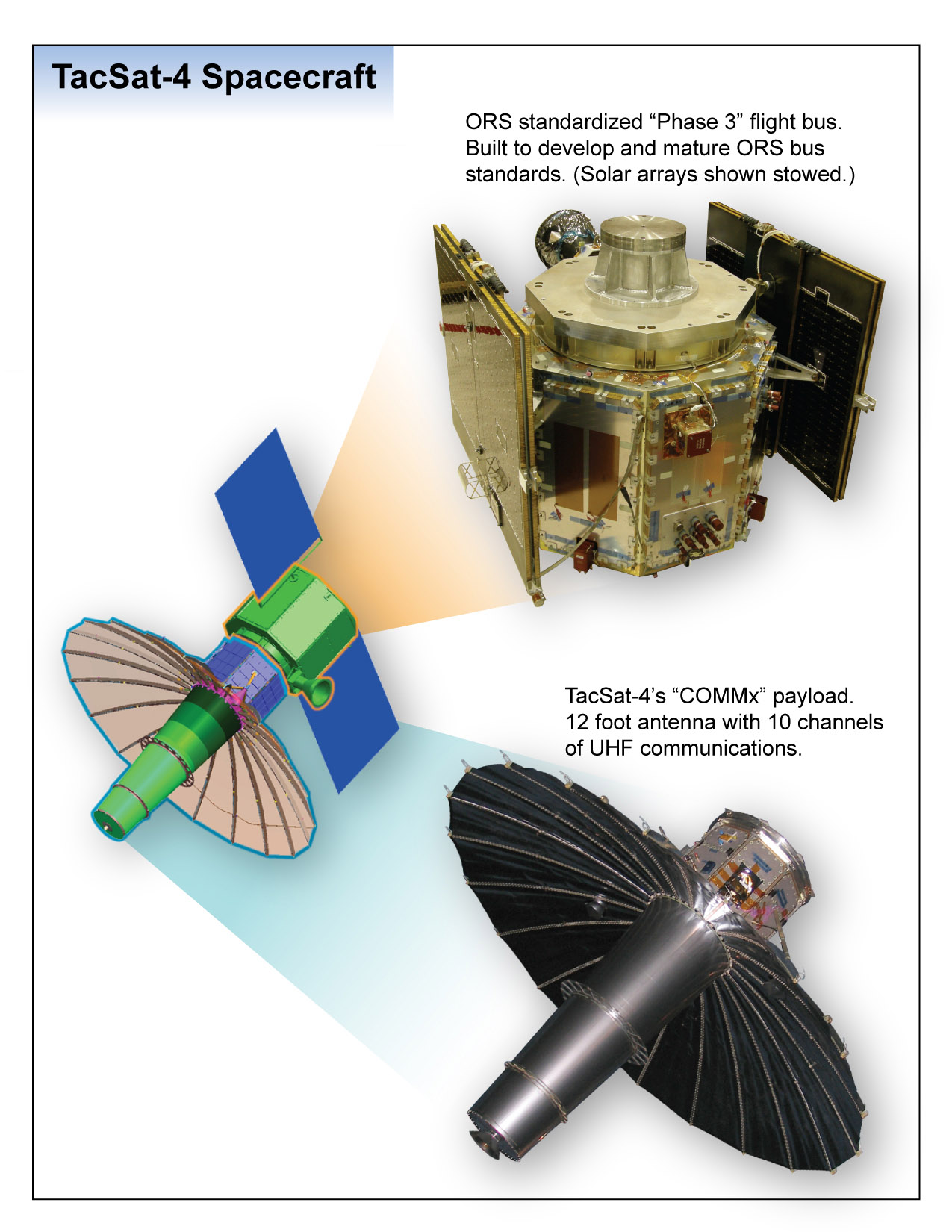
Bus and COMMx payload

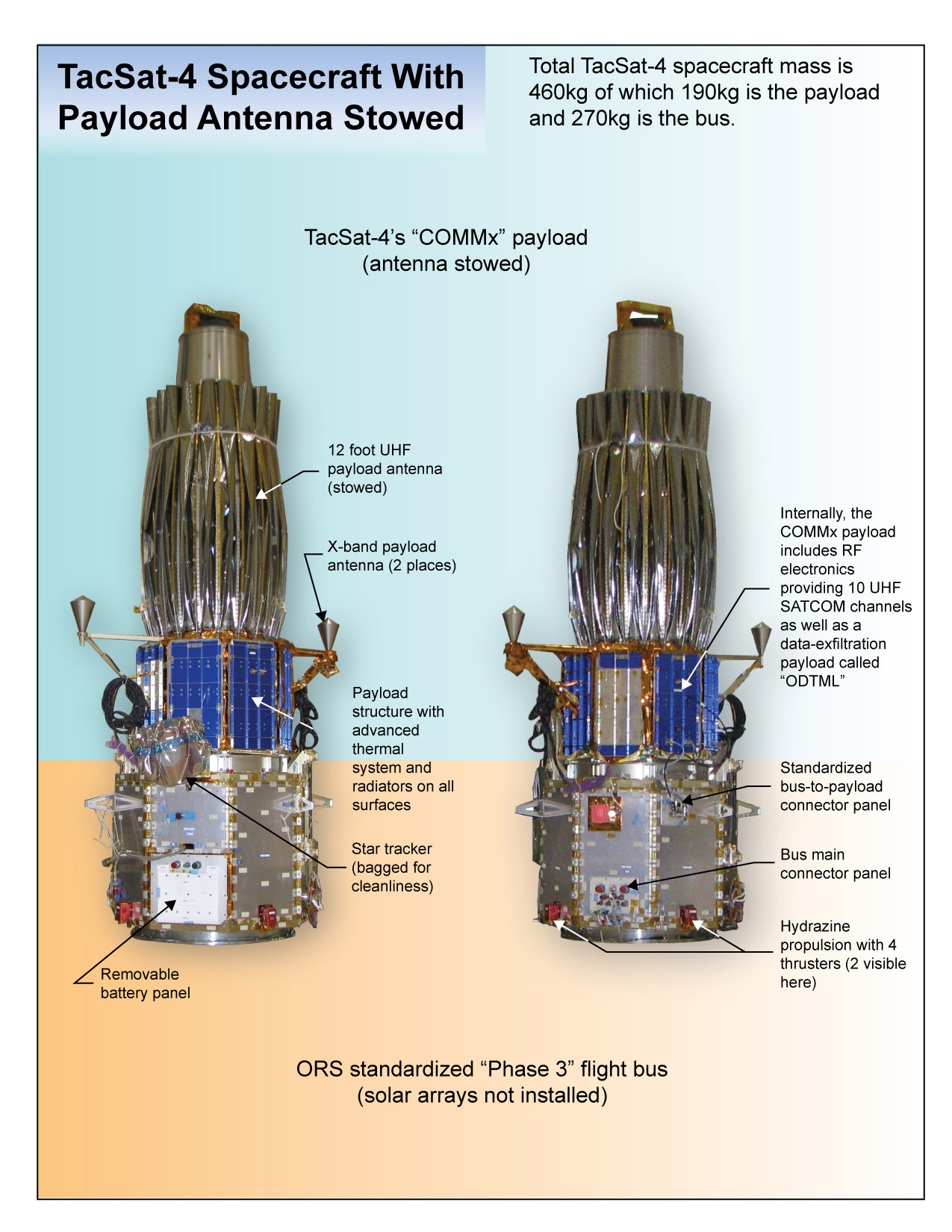
System overview
