= Operationally Responsive Space Office =

The Operationally Responsive Space Office (ORS Office) was a joint initiative of the United States Department of Defense (DoD). The "stand up" of the office took place 21 May 2007 at Kirtland Air Force Base. The ORS Office focuses on providing quick-response tactical space-based capabilities; utilizing smaller satellites, such as the Tactical Satellite Program and smaller launch vehicles. Organizations that have been involved in ORS activities include the United States Space Force, United States Army, the United States Navy, DARPA, the National Reconnaissance Office, the Missile Defense Agency and NASA.

In 2018, the ORS office was evolved to become the Space Rapid Capabilities Office.

== Leadership ==
Col. Kevin McLaughlin, who was also the commander of the Space Development and Test Wing located at Kirtland, became the first director of the ORS office in May 2007. Peter Wegner became director of the ORS office in May 2008 and served until October 2012. Col. John Anttonen took over as Director of the ORS Office in February 2013. Col. Shahnaz Punjani assumed command of the ORS office on August 17, 2015.

== History ==
The Joint ORS Office worked with the other space agencys to provide "(an) assured space power focused on timely satisfaction of Joint Force Commanders' needs". The end state of the ORS concept is the ability to address emerging, persistent, or unanticipated needs.

The ORS Office implemented a process using a Modular Open Systems Architecture (MOSA) to facilitate rapid assembly, integration, and test (AI&T), deployment, and operations of space assets into the current space architecture in operationally relevant timelines. The ORS Office focuses on material (Note: spacecraft, launch, range payloads) and non-material solutions. (Note: business model, acquisition, policy, industrial base, training, command and control, tasking, exploitation, processing, and dissemination, concept of operations)

== Missions ==
The Joint ORS Office addressed a new approach to risk and mission assurance to rapidly deploy capabilities to satisfy warfighter needs across operations. ORS supported the following missions during its operational history.

=== Jumpstart ===
On May 29, 2008 SpaceDev announced its Trailblazer spacecraft bus had been selected by the ORS Office as the primary payload to fly on its inaugural "Jumpstart" mission. The Jumpstart payload was carried by the third Falcon 1 flight, which launched from Kwajalein in August 2008 but failed to reach orbit.

=== ORS-1 ===
June 29, 2011 ORS-1 was launched from the Mid-Atlantic Regional Spaceport on Wallops Island on a Minotaur I rocket.

=== TacSat-3 ===
TacSat-3 is the first on-orbit Department of Defense intelligence, surveillance and reconnaissance capability delivered to U.S. Strategic Command for their direct imagery support to worldwide combatant commanders. TacSat-3 complements the wide array of Intelligence Community Combat Support Agencies and other space-based ISR systems that provide information to the United States armed forces.

=== TacSat-4 ===
TacSat-4 was launched on September 27, 2011. The Operationally Responsive Space (ORS) Office and Air Force's Space and Missile Systems Center (SMC) provided the launch on a Minotaur IV from Kodiak, Alaska.

=== ORS-4 ===
Launch on November 4, 2015 GMT (November 3, Hawaii Standard Time) of a SPARK, also called Super Strypi, rocket occurred using a new rail-guided system; this was the first launch from Hawaii. Spaceflight Now received a statement from the Air Force that "The ORS-4 mission on an experimental Super Strypi launch vehicle failed in mid-flight shortly after liftoff", which matched observations of viewers on the ground. 13 CubeSat spacecraft were on board; the primary payload was from the University of Hawaii, two were a part of a NASA's Launch Services Program ELaNa mission, and eight were the EDSN constellation from NASA's Ames Research Center.

=== ORS-5 ===
On 26 August 2017 the Operationally Responsive Space-5 (ORS-5) satellite was launched from Space Launch Complex 46 at Cape Canaveral Air Force Station in Florida. An Orbital ATK Minotaur IV rocket lifted SensorSat into low Earth orbit. A second Orion (rocket stage) was used to push SensorSat into equatorial orbit. Its mission is situational awareness, to scan the geosynchronous belt for any new geosynchronous satellites, as well as for space junk that may threaten existing geosynchronous satellites.
