= Delta 1000 =

American expendable rocket launch system

Delta 1000 series
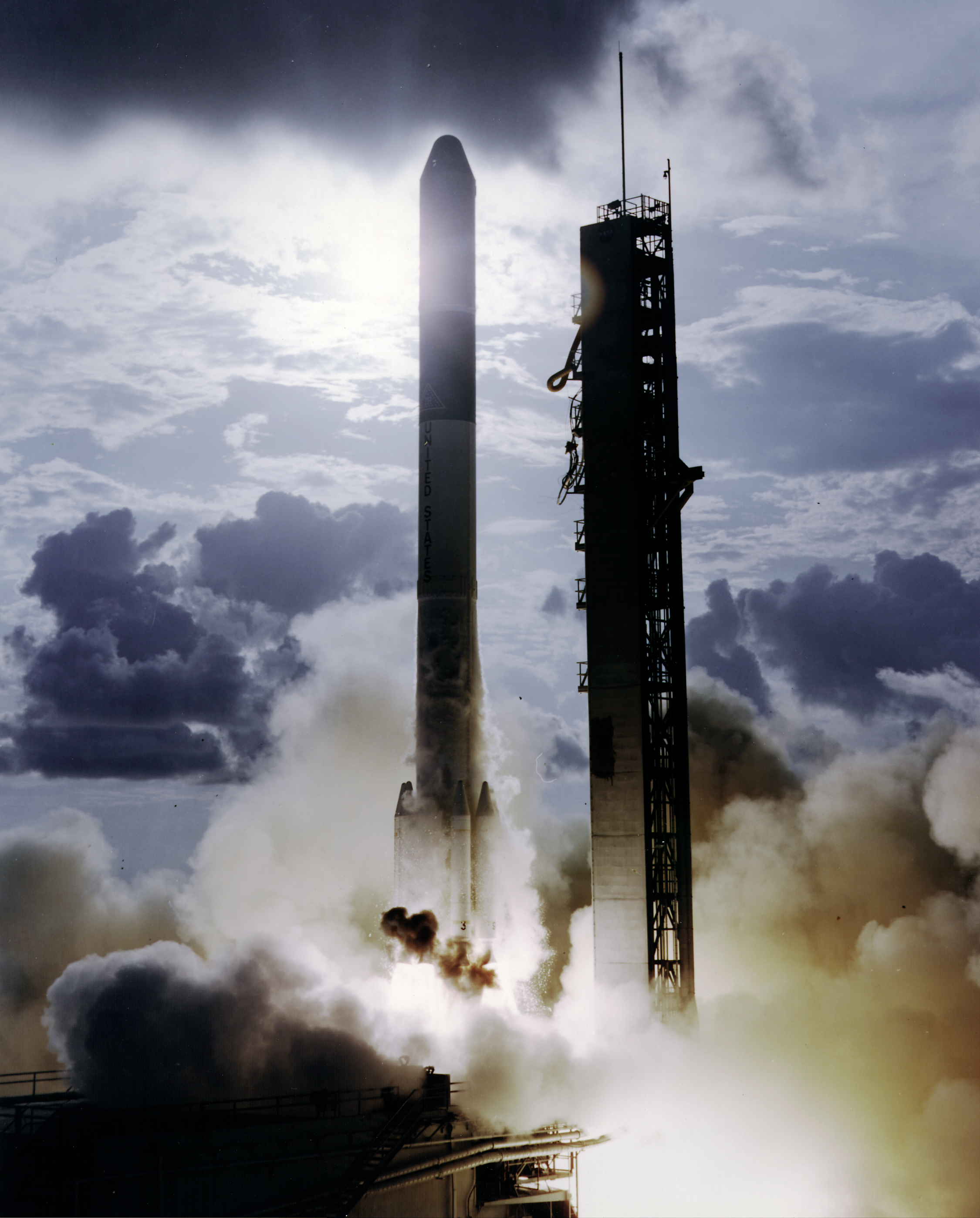
- Delta 1910 launching OSO-8
- Function: Expendable launch system
- Country of origin: United States

Launch history
- Status: Retired
- Launch sites: Canaveral LC-17B; Vandenberg SLC-2W
- Total launches: 8
- Success(es): 8
- First flight: 23 September 1972
- Last flight: 21 June 1975

The Delta 1000 series (also referred to as Straight-Eight) was an American expendable launch system which was used to conduct eight orbital launches between 1972 and 1975. It was a member of the Delta family of rockets. Several variants existed, differentiated by a four digit numerical code. Delta 1000 was developed by McDonnell Douglas company (now — Boeing) in 1972.

The same first stage and boosters were used on all variants. The first stage was an Extended Long Tank Thor, a further stretched version of the Long Tank Thor used on earlier versions, itself derived from the Thor missile. Four, six or nine Castor-2 solid rocket boosters were attached to increase thrust at lift-off. These improvements permitted the Delta 1000 series to lift 1,835 kg (4,045 lbs) to LEO or 635 kg (1,400 lbs) to GTO.

The nickname "Straight-Eight" comes from the fact that its second stage variants had the same 8 ft. (2.4 m) diameter as the first stage; previous Delta second stages were smaller in diameter. Two different second stages were flown, depending on the variant:

- The Delta-F second stage, featuring the Aerojet AJ10-118F engine, was flown on three launches, with Explorer 47, 50 and 51; the Aerojet engine was flown for the (Anik A1) satellite launch (mistakenly marked as xx1x in Delta 1000 series)
- The Delta-P second stage, featuring the new TRW TR-201 engine, was used for two launches each in 1973 (with Explorer 49) and 1975 (with OSO 8).

Some flights used a third stage, either the Thiokol Star-37D or Star-37E, for launches beyond low Earth orbit. One probe launched by the Delta 1000 series, Delta 1913, was Explorer 49 that was placed into lunar orbit on 10 June 1973.

Delta 1000 rockets were launched from Space Launch Complex 2W at Vandenberg AFB and Launch Complex 17B at Cape Canaveral. All eight (1972–1975) launches were successful.

Delta 1000 series launches
S/N	Version	Date	Location	Payload
Delta 90	Delta-1604	23.09.1972	LC-17B	Explorer 47
Delta 92	Delta-1914	10.11.1972	LC-17B	Anik A1
Delta 94	Delta-1914	20.04.1973	LC-17B	Anik A2
Delta 95	Delta-1913	10.06.1973	LC-17B	Explorer 49
Delta 97	Delta-1604	26.10.1973	LC-17B	Explorer 50
Delta 99	Delta-1900	16.12.1973	SLC-2W	Explorer 51
Delta 109	Delta-1410	09.04.1975	SLC-2W	GEOS 3
Delta 112	Delta-1910	21.06.1975	LC-17B	OSO 8

The Japanese N-II and H-I launch vehicles used the same Extended Long Tank Thor first stage. For the second stage, the N-II used the Delta-F while the H-I had the Japanese LE-5 engine which used liquid hydrogen and oxygen.
