= Explorer 49 =

NASA satellite of the Explorer program

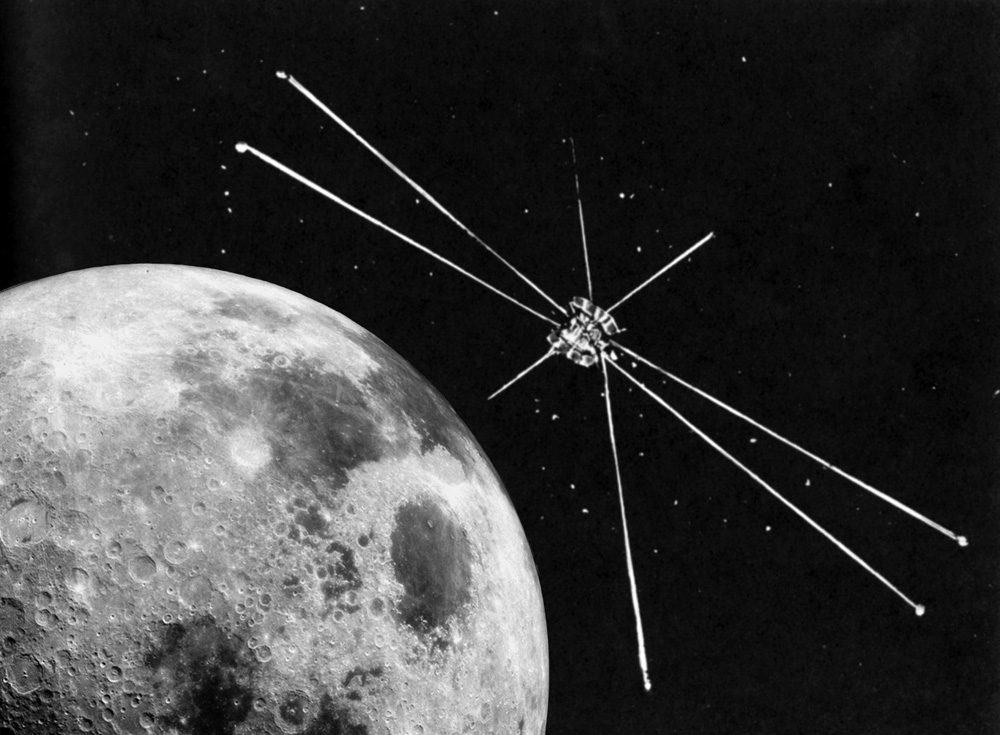
- Explorer 49 in orbit around the Moon
- Names: RAE-B; RAE-2; Radio Astronomy Explorer-2
- Mission type: Radio astronomy
- Operator: NASA
- COSPAR ID: 1973-039A
- SATCAT no.: 06686
- Mission duration: 4 years and 2 months (achieved)

Spacecraft properties
- Spacecraft: Explorer XLIX
- Spacecraft type: Radio Astronomy Explorer
- Bus: RAE
- Manufacturer: Goddard Space Flight Center
- Launch mass: 330.2 kg
- Dimensions: 92 cm (36 in) diameter and 79 cm (31 in) high
- Power: 25 watts

Start of mission
- Launch date: 10 June 1973, 14:13:00 UTC
- Rocket: Thor-Delta 1913 (Thor 581 / Delta 095)
- Launch site: Cape Canaveral, LC-17B
- Contractor: Douglas Aircraft Company
- Entered service: 10 June 1973

End of mission
- Destroyed: September 1977
- Last contact: August 1977

Orbital parameters
- Reference system: Selenocentric orbit
- Periselene altitude: 1,053 km (654 mi)
- Aposelene altitude: 1,064 km (661 mi)
- Inclination: 55.70°
- Period: 221.17 minutes

Moon orbiter
- Orbital insertion: 15 June 1973, 07:21 UTC

Instruments
- Impedance Probe; Rapid-Burst Receivers; Step Frequency Radiometers

Explorer 49 (also called Radio Astronomy Explorer-2, RAE-B) was a NASA 328 kg (723 lb) satellite launched on 10 June 1973, for long wave radio astronomy research. It had four 230 m (750 ft) X-shaped antenna elements, which made it one of the largest spacecraft ever built.

== Mission ==
The Radio Astronomy Explorer B (RAE-B) mission was the second of a pair of RAE satellites. It was placed into lunar orbit to provide radio astronomical measurements of the planets, the Sun, and the galaxy over the frequency range of 25-kHz to 13.1-MHz. The experiment complement consisted of two Ryle-Vonberg radiometers (nine channels each), three swept-frequency burst receivers (32 channels each), and an impedance probe for calibration. The experiment antenna package, made of BeCu, consisted of very long traveling wave antennas forming an X configuration: a 229 m (751 ft) upper V-antenna pointed away from the Moon; a 229 m (751 ft) lower V-antenna pointed toward the Moon; and a 37 m (121 ft) dipole antenna parallel to the lunar surface. There was also a 129 m (423 ft) boron libration damper boom system used to damp out any spacecraft oscillations about the equilibrium position.

== Spacecraft ==
The spacecraft body, constructed of aluminum and aluminum honeycomb, had a mass of 328 kg (723 lb) at launch and 200 kg (440 lb) in lunar orbit. It was a truncated cylinder 92 cm (36 in) in diameter and approximately 79 cm (31 in) high, with four fixed solar paddles. The solar arrays were n-p solar cells generating 25 watts and powering nickel-cadmium batteries. The maneuvering system consisted of a hydrazine velocity correction package, a cold gas attitude control system, and a solid fuel lunar insertion motor. Data were returned to the Earth via either a low-power UHF/(400-MHz) transmitter, in real-time, or stored in an onboard tape recorder and transmitted to Earth via a high-power Ultra high frequency (UHF) transmitter (400-MHz). Two tape recorders provided backup storage. A Very high frequency (VHF) transmitter served primarily for range and range-rate measurements and as a backup. Commands were received on a VHF (148-MHz) receiver, which also was a part of the range and range-rate system. Spacecraft attitude was determined by: (1) a solar aspect system, (2) a horizon sensor system and (3) a panoramic attitude sensor system, and was accurate to 1°. The spacecraft was gravity gradient oriented (Z axis parallel to local vertical).

== Launch ==
Explorer 49 was launched after the termination of the Apollo program in 1972, and although it did not examine the Moon directly, it became the last American lunar orbital mission until the launch of Clementine spacecraft in 1994. It was launched on 10 June 1973, at 14:13:00 UTC from Cape Canaveral by the Delta 1913 from the launch site LC-17B.

== Orbit ==
Explorer 49 was placed into lunar orbit so that radio waves from Earth would not be as big of an interference as Explorer 38 had discovered. After launch on a direct ascent trajectory to the Moon and one mid-course correction on 11 June 1973, was placed into lunar orbit on 15 June 1973, at 07:21 UTC, after a 20-second firing of the solid apogee kick motor, and began operations on 20 June 1973. Initially, only the 37 m (121 ft) dipole antenna was deployed, during which the spacecraft was operated in a 4-rpm spin-stabilized mode with the spin axis in the ecliptic plane normal to the spacecraft-Sun line. After three weeks the dipole booms were retracted, the spacecraft reoriented, the long-V antennas and libration damper were extended, and the dipole was redeployed. The lower V-antenna was initially extended to 183 m (600 ft) during the first 16 months of flight and was extended to its full 229 m (751 ft) length in November 1974. The lunar orbit and position of the Earth as a radio source imposed periodicities on the observations of 29.5 days (the lunar synodic month) and 24.8 hours (the interval between consecutive sweeps of a given Earth geographic position past the Moon.

== Experiments ==
The principal investigator for all the experiments was Dr. Robert G. Stone.

=== Impedance Probe ===
- This experiment was an engineering experiment to check the upper v-antenna. It was used only for routine confirmation of antenna characteristics early in the flight.

=== Rapid-Burst Receivers ===
The burst receivers (BR) were 32-channel, stepped-frequency (25-kHz to 13.1-MHz) receivers, which obtained one sample at each frequency every 7.68-seconds. One receiver (BR-1) was connected to the upper V-antenna and one receiver (BR-2) was connected to the lower V-antenna. A third burst receiver was connected to the dipole antenna, but it failed 1 week into the flight and no significant data resulted. The RF voltage at the feed point of each half of the V-antenna was sampled by a wideband, high-impedance preamplifier, and the preamplifier outputs were combined in a balun transformer and fed to the burst receiver. Each burst receiver was composed of a pair of redundant IF amplifiers and detectors, which shared a common set of crystal-controlled local oscillators and mixers. Only one IF strip was powered on at a given time; the other was used as a backup system. Low-pass filters at the input of the burst receiver prevented strong signals at the 21.4-MHz intermediate frequency from entering the IF strip. Each receiver had a crystal-controlled IF bandwidth of 20 kHz and a post-detection integration time constant of 6 ms. A thermistor located in each burst receiver provided a measurement of the ambient temperature of the receiver, and this information was included in the housekeeping data telemetered every 19.7 minutes. Also, the normal antenna signal measurement sequence was interrupted for 1.28 minutes every 19.7 minutes, and calibration noise source signals were injected into each burst receiver to provide a check of their long-term gain stability. The total dynamic range of the burst receivers was approximately 60 dB and was divided into two 30-dB ranges by logic circuitry in the detector electronics. The limit of the input signal level resolution that was due to telemetry quantization step size was about 0.3 dB. Saturation level signals at the preamplifier input often resulted in the generation of intermodulation products in the radio frequency amplifiers, which then appeared as wideband signals in the telemetered data. This problem was most acute when intense kilometer wavelength emissions from the terrestrial magnetosphere were observed at frequencies in the 200 to 300 kHz range. BR-1 was less susceptible to intermodulation problems than BR-2 by 6 to 10 dB. Because of a failure in the local oscillator circuitry in BR-1, channels 4 (55-kHz) and 12 (210-kHz) did not provide usable data. During periods when a portion of each orbit was in the lunar shadow, cyclic variations in thermal gradients across the V-antenna booms resulted in scissor-mode oscillations of the booms, which did not occur when the spacecraft was in 100% sunlight. This effect had a period of approximately 50 minutes (the scissor-mode period) and was most pronounced on the upper V-antenna during the first and fifth lunar shadow periods and on the lower V-antenna during the second and third lunar shadow periods.

=== Step Frequency Radiometers ===
The Ryle-Vonberg (RV) receivers were designed to provide measurements that were relatively insensitive to gain and bandwidth changes. There were two receivers—RV-1 connected to the upper V-antenna and RV-2 connected to the lower V-antenna. The radiometers had an effective bandwidth of 40 kHz and a postdetection time constant of 0.1 seconds. A coarse output channel was obtained from the integrated servo-loop error signal, and a fine output channel was obtained from the noise source output required to match the antenna signal. The time constant for the fine channel was 0.5 seconds. A thermistor located in the receiver measured the ambient temperature, which was telemetered every 19.7 minutes in the housekeeping data. The receivers operated at nine frequencies from 0.45 to 9.18-MHz. Each frequency was selected for 15.4 seconds before stepping to the next. During this time, eight coarse and two fine samples were taken. Of the eight coarse samples, the first was not reliable since not enough time had elapsed for the receiver to stabilize after the frequency switch was made.

== End of the mission ==
Contact was lost in August 1977. The orbiter presumably crashed some time after this.

== See also ==
- 1973 in spaceflight
- Timeline of artificial satellites and space probes
- Explorer 38
- Explorer program
