= Explorer 54 =

NASA satellite of the Explorer program

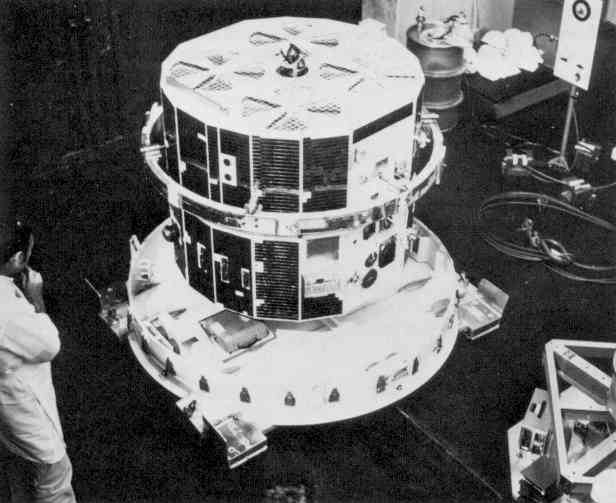
- Explorer 54 (AE-D) satellite
- Names: AE-D; Atmosphere Explorer-D
- Mission type: Earth science
- Operator: NASA
- COSPAR ID: 1975-096A
- SATCAT no.: 08353
- Mission duration: 4 months (achieved)

Spacecraft properties
- Spacecraft: Explorer LIV
- Spacecraft type: Atmosphere Explorer
- Bus: AE
- Manufacturer: Goddard Space Flight Center
- Launch mass: 681 kg (1,501 lb)

Start of mission
- Launch date: 6 October 1975, 09:00:50 UTC
- Rocket: Thor-Delta 2910 (Thor 600 / Delta 115)
- Launch site: Vandenberg, SLC-2W
- Contractor: Douglas Aircraft Company
- Entered service: 6 October 1975

End of mission
- Last contact: 29 January 1976
- Decay date: 12 March 1976

Orbital parameters
- Reference system: Geocentric orbit
- Regime: Medium Earth orbit
- Perigee altitude: 154 km (96 mi)
- Apogee altitude: 3,816 km (2,371 mi)
- Inclination: 90.10°
- Period: 126.90 minutes

Instruments
- Miniature Electrostatic Accelerometer (MESA); Capacitance Manometer; Cold Cathode Ion Gauge; Cylindrical Electrostatic Probe (CEP); Low-Energy Electrons (LEE); Magnetic Ion-Mass Spectrometer (MIMS); Neutral Atmosphere Composition (NACE); Neutral Atmosphere Temperature (NATE); Open-Source Neutral Mass Spectrometer; Photoelectron Spectrometer (PES); Planetary Atmosphere Composition Test; Reflected Gas (Spacecraft); Retarding Potential Analyzer/Drift Meter; Solar Extreme Ultraviolet Spectrophotometer (EUVS); Ultraviolet Nitric-Oxide Experiment (UVNO); Visible Airglow Photometer (VAE)

Explorer 54, also known as AE-D (Atmosphere Explorer-D), was a NASA scientific satellite belonging to the Atmosphere Explorer series launched on 6 October 1975 from Vandenberg Air Force Base aboard a Thor-Delta 2910 launch vehicle.

== Mission ==
The purpose of Explorer 54 was to continue the investigation begun by Explorer 51 (AE-C) of the chemical processes and energy transfer mechanisms that control the structure and behavior of the Earth's atmosphere and ionosphere in the region of high absorption of solar energy. This mission was planned to sample the high latitude regions at the same time that the Explorer 55 (AE-E) mission was sampling the equatorial and low latitude regions. The same type of spacecraft as Explorer 54 was used, and the payload consisted of the same types of instruments except for the deletion of the extreme solar ultraviolet monitor and the Bennett ion mass spectrometer, which were part of the Explorer 55 (AE-E) payload.

== Experiments ==
=== Miniature Electrostatic Accelerometer (MESA) ===
The Miniature Electrostatic Analyzer (MESA) obtained data on the neutral density of the atmosphere in the altitude range of 120 km (75 mi) to 400 km (250 mi) by the measurements of satellite deceleration due to aerodynamic drag. The instrument consisted of three single-axis accelerometers, mounted mutually at right angles, two in the spacecraft X-Y plane and the other in the Z-axis. The instrument determined the applied acceleration from the electrostatic force required to recenter a proof mass. The output of the device was a digital pulse rate proportional to the applied acceleration. The sample time of each measurement was 0.25 seconds. The measurements allowed the determination of the density of the neutral atmosphere, monitored the thrust of the "Orbit-Adjust Propulsion System" (OAPS), determined the satellite minimum altitude, measured spacecraft roll, and provided some attitude-sensing information. Spacecraft nutations of less than 0.01° were monitored. The instrument had three sensitivity ranges: 8.E-3 Earth's gravity (G) in OAPS monitor mode; 4.E-4 G between 120 km (75 mi) (± 2%) and 280 km (170 mi) (± 10%); and 2.E-5 G between 180 km (110 mi) (± 2%) and 400 km (250 mi) (± 10%). Numbers in parentheses represent errors. A systematic error of up to ± 5% due to drag coefficient uncertainty was also possible. The highest measurement altitude was determined assuming the instrument could sense to 0.2% of full scale.

=== Capacitance Manometer ===
The capacitance manometer was primarily an engineering experiment to provide data on spacecraft operations. However, data from this experiment were also correlated with accelerometer and ion gauge data in evaluating satellite drag. The manometer, also referred to as Pressure Sensor B (PSB), provided a direct measure of atmospheric pressure in the region below 200 km. The accuracy of the PSB gauge varied from about 10% at 120 km (75 mi) to about 40% at 180 km (110 mi). The PSB consisted of two spherical, thermally controlled chambers, separated by a thin membrane stretched flat and under radial tension. Any deflection of the diaphragm caused by a pressure differential between the two sides caused a change in capacitance between the diaphragm and an adjacent electrode which biased an AC bridge circuit. Air was allowed into one of the chambers through two ports 180° apart and perpendicular to the spacecraft spin axis. Thus the wake-ram pressure differential was sampled twice each spacecraft revolution.

=== Cold Cathode Ion Gauge ===
The cold cathode-ion gauge flown on AE-D was primarily an engineering experiment to provide data on spacecraft operation. However, data from this experiment were correlated with accelerometer and capacitance manometer data to evaluate satellite drag performance. The ion gauge, also referred to as Pressure Sensor A (PSA), measured atmospheric pressure in the region between 120 km (75 mi) and 370 km (230 mi) above the Earth's surface for values of atmospheric pressure between 1.3E-3 to 1.3E-7 mb. The estimated accuracy of the PSA was ± 20%. The cylindrically shaped sensor package consisted of a wedge-shaped orifice, a cathode near ground potential, an anode operating at about 1300 VDC, and a permanent magnetic field of about 1600 Gauss. The gauge contained no primary source of ionizing electrons. The discharge was initiated by field emission and was self-sustaining at a pressure above 1.3E-7 mb. The ion current was collected at the cathode. The sensor was mounted on the spacecraft with the orifice perpendicular to the spacecraft spin axis, which was normal to the orbital plane. The instrument was operated in two modes, spinning or despun. When the spacecraft was in a spinning mode, the PSA alternately sampled the ram and wake pressure. When the spacecraft was in the despun mode, the PSA faced 30° from the direction of motion. Data from this experiment were not tape-recorded but were observed in real-time.

=== Cylindrical Electrostatic Probe (CEP) ===
The CEP consisted of two identical instruments designed to measure electron temperatures, electron and ion concentrations, ion mass, and spacecraft potential. One probe was oriented along the spin axis of the spacecraft (normally perpendicular to the orbit plane), and the other radially so that it could observe in the direction of the velocity vector once each 15-second spin period. Each instrument was a retarding potential Langmuir probe device that produced a current-voltage (I-V) curve for a known voltage pattern placed on the collector. Electrometers were used to measure the current. There were two systems of operation (one with two modes and another with three modes) using collector voltage patterns between ± 5 volts. Most modes involved an automatic or fixed adjustment of collector voltage limits (and/or electrometer output) such that the region of interest on the I-V profile provided high resolution. Each system was designed for use with only one of the probes, but they could be interswitched to provide backup redundancy. The best measurements in the most favorable modes provided one-second time resolution; electron temperature between 300K and 10,000K (10% accuracy); ion density between 10,000 and 10,000,000 ions/cc (10-20% accuracy); electron density between 50 and 1,000,000 electrons/cc; and ion mass at ion densities above 10,000 ions/cc. Each probe had a collector electrode extending from the central axis of a cylindrical guard ring. The 2.5 cm (0.98 in)-long guard ring was at the end of a 25 cm (9.8 in) boom, and the collector extended another 7.5 cm (3.0 in) beyond the guard ring. The boom, guard, and collector were 0.2 cm (0.079 in) in diameter.

=== Low-Energy Electrons (LEE) ===
This experiment furnished direct measurements of the energy input into the upper atmosphere due to electrons and protons (ions) in the energy range 0.2 to 25 keV. The fluxes of electrons and ions were measured with cylindrical electrostatic analyzers and Spiraltron electron multipliers. There were 19 detectors, one ion-stepped-energy analyzer, and two electron-stepped analyzers mounted at different angles. In addition, there were 16 fixed energy detectors that obtained high-time-resolution angular distributions, in the spacecraft one revolution-per-orbit mode, at five energies between 0.72 and 18 keV.

=== Magnetic Ion-Mass Spectrometer (MIMS) ===
A magnetic ion-mass spectrometer was flown to measure in situ the concentrations of the ambient positive ion species in the mass range from 1 to 90 atomic mass units (u). Mounted on the satellite equator normal to the spin axis, the entrance aperture faced forward when the spacecraft was in the despun mode. The electric and magnetic fields were arranged to produce a mass spectrum along the focal plane following the magnetic analyzer. Three slits were placed along this plane in appropriate places to simultaneously collect ions in the mass ratio 1-4-16. Ionospheric ions were accelerated into the analyzer system by a negative voltage that varied from -1060 to -225 Volts. The three mass ranges measured simultaneously were 1 to 4, 4 to 16, and 14 to 72 units. Following each slit was an electron multiplier and logarithmic electrometer-amplifier detector. The detector output was either measured directly for an analog output or was supplied to a "peak" circuit that determined the amplitude of each peak in the spectrum. Only the amplitude of each peak was telemetered in the "peak" mode, and in this mode the time required to simultaneously sweep all three mass ranges was 1 second. Other modes of operation were possible. In the analog short mode, the three mass ranges were swept in 2-seconds, alternating with 1-second "peak" mode scans. An 8-second sweep time was required in the analog long mode, again alternating with 1-second "peak" mode scans. An option existed in the locked mode to continuously measure any set of mass numbers in the ratio 1-4-16 to give high spatial resolution.

=== Neutral Atmosphere Composition (NACE) ===
This experiment measured in situ the spatial distribution and temporal changes of the concentrations of the neutral atmospheric species. In addition, new insight into in situ measurement techniques was obtained from comparisons of these measurements with other onboard experiments: namely, open-source spectrometer (1975-096A-07), solar EUV spectrophotometer (1975-096A-06), and density accelerometer (1975-096A-02). The mass-spectrometer sensor included a gold-plated stainless steel thermalizing chamber and ion source, a hyperbolic-rod quadrupole analyzer, and an off-axis electron multiplier. Five different sequences of mass selection were available and, expressed in atomic mass units (u), were as follows: (1) geophysical: -1, 2, 4, total, 16, 28, 32, selected, 40, (2) analytical: -12, 14, 18, 20, 22, 30, 44, calibrate, zero, (3) individual: -selected, selected, selected, ... (any mass 1 to 44), (4) sweep digital: -1, 2, 3, 4, 5, ... 45 (in 3/16-units steps), (5) sweep analog: 2, 3, 4, 5, ... 45 (continuous). Five operational formats were available and selected by ground command. When operating in the "normal" format, the analyzer measured all masses in the range 1 to 44 with emphasis on hydrogen, helium, oxygen, nitrogen, and argon. Another format was optimized for minor constituent studies of any individual gas species in the measured range. Spatial resolution was determined primarily by the mode of spacecraft operation. In orbit, the pre-sealed spectrometer was opened, and the atmospheric constituents passed through a knife-edged orifice into the thermalization chamber and ion source. Selected ions left the quadrupole analyzer through a weak focusing lens and were accelerated into a 14-stage electron multiplier, where they were turned 90° to strike the first dynode. For each impacting ion, the multiplier output was a pulse of 2.E6 electrons. These output pulses constituted the measurement and the count rate was proportional to the chamber density of the selected species. These density values were converted to ambient concentrations. The analyzer normally operated at a resolution of 1 unit over the mass range, so that a mass peak one-thousandth the amplitude of an adjacent peak could be measured. For the dynamic range required, pulses occurring during 0.015-second integration intervals were accumulated in a 16-bit counter. Multiple integration periods (up to 16) were assigned to each measurement for less dense atmospheric species. Automatically selected ranges of ionizing electron currents were used. The overall range of the measurements was planned to be greater than 10,000,000. There was a provision for the instrument orifice to be covered during spacecraft thruster operations.

=== Neutral Atmosphere Temperature (NATE) ===
This experiment was designed to measure the kinetic temperature of the neutral atmosphere by determining the instantaneous density of molecular nitrogen in a spherical chamber coupled to the atmosphere through a knife-edge orifice. Analysis of the measured molecular nitrogen density variation over a spin cycle with knowledge of the satellite's motion and orientation led to a determination of the ambient temperature, independent of scale height. The NATE also provided measurements of the neutral composition, when commanded into the appropriate mode. In addition, values for the zonal wind were obtained, from measurement of the "stream" position relative to the satellite velocity. An alternate measurement of neutral temperature also was undertaken, using a baffle inserted in front of the orifice to intercept a portion of the gas-particle stream entering the chamber. When the satellite was in the despun mode, the baffle was made to oscillate in a stepwise fashion in order to interrupt the particle stream seen by the orificed chamber. These chamber density variations were interpreted to yield the neutral gas kinetic temperature also. A dual-filament ion source sampled the thermalized molecular nitrogen in the chamber and produced an ion beam density proportional to the nitrogen chamber density. From the source, the ionized beam was directed to a quadrupole analyzer, tuned to pass those particles whose mass-to-charge ratio (M/Q) was 28. This ionized nitrogen beam then passed on to an electron multiplier. The output pulses were amplified and counted in a 16-bit accumulator. The sensor was vacuum-sealed prior to launch and opened to the atmosphere after the spacecraft was in orbit.

=== Open-Source Neutral Mass Spectrometer ===
The objective of this experiment was to contribute to a study of the chemical, dynamic, and energetic processes that control the structure of the thermosphere by providing direct, in situ measurements of both major and minor neutral atmospheric constituents having masses in the range from 1 to 48 atomic mass units (u). A double-focusing Mattauch-Herzog magnetic deflection mass spectrometer with an impact ion source was flown. Two ion collectors were included to measure ions differing in mass by a factor of 8, i.e. the two mass ranges covered were 1 to 6 units and 6 to 48 units. In the ion source, the neutral species were ionized by means of electron impact. At altitudes greater than 380 km (240 mi), ion currents were measured with an electron multiplier counting individual ions. Counts were accumulated for 1/20 second before automatically switching to a different mass number. While complete mass spectra could be swept, in the common mode of operation peak stepping was employed, with readings on the principal peaks in the mass spectrum being repeated approximately every 0.5 second and on other species less frequently. Data below 380 km (240 mi) were measured using an electrometer. In addition to the peak-stepping mode, there were several other operating modes which were selected by ground command. In the fly-through mode, the ion source voltages were adjusted so that there was no electric field to draw ions out of the electron beam when they were formed. Ambient particles striking the ion source retained energies less than 0.1 eV, which is not high enough to overcome the negative space charge potential holding the ions in the beam. Those ambient particles that did not strike the ion source retained their incoming energy of several eV after ionization and escaped into the accelerating region of the analyzer. The electron accelerating potential was 75 eV in normal mode operation and 25 eV in the fly-through mode. In another operating mode, the instrument switched automatically to a sequence of masses of particular interest such as, e.g. between masses 16 and 32 or between masses 28 and 32.

=== Photoelectron Spectrometer (PES) ===
This experiment was designed to provide information on the intensity, angular distribution, energy spectrum, and net flows along field lines, of electrons in the thermosphere with energies between 1 and 500 eV. The instrument consisted of two identical oppositely directed hemispherical electrostatic analyzers, and it had 30 operating modes. Each spectrometer had a relative energy resolution ± 2.5% and a geometric factor on the order of 0.001 cm^{2} sr, independent of electron energy. Three separate energy ranges could be sensed: 0 to 25, 0 to 100, or 0 to 500 eV. Measurements from these intervals could be sequenced in 5 different ways. Data could be taken from either sensor separately, or alternately with time resolution varying from 0.25 to 8 seconds. There were two deflection voltage scan rates determined by the spacecraft clock. This voltage was changed in 64 steps and was done at 4 or 16 steps per telemetry frame. With 16 frames/seconds, this allowed a choice of either one 64-point spectrum or four 16-point spectra in 1 second. The longest (8 seconds) cycle of data involved observations using increasing voltage steps for the lowest, middle, lowest, then highest energy ranges (in that order) for 1 second each. A repeat for decreasing voltage steps completed the cycle.

=== Planetary Atmosphere Composition Test ===
This was an engineering test version of a planetary composition experiment.

=== Reflected Gas (Spacecraft) ===
This engineering experiment measured the gas reflected back to the spacecraft from the atmosphere underneath.

=== Retarding Potential Analyzer/Drift Meter ===
This experiment was designed to determine vector ion drift velocities, ion concentration and temperature, and spacecraft potential. An ionospheric irregularity index was also obtained from the ion concentration sensor. The experiment consisted of a retarding potential analyzer with four planar sensor heads. The sensor head used for ion drift measurements was co-located with another head, and all heads were spaced almost equally, looking outward from the satellite equator. Since the satellite spin axis was perpendicular to the orbit plane, these heads could observe along the spacecraft velocity vector in either the spin or despun mode of the spacecraft. The primary purpose of this experiment was to provide accurate ion temperatures with other measurements being of secondary importance. Three of the sensor heads were similar: they had two grounded entrance grids, two retarding grids, a suppressor grid, a shield grid, and a collector. A linear sweep voltage (32 or 22 to 0 volts, up or down) was normally applied to the retarding grids in 0.75 seconds. Interpretation of the resulting current-voltage profiles provided the ion temperature, the ion and electron concentration, some ion composition information, vehicle potential and plasma drift velocity parallel to the velocity vector. Two of the three similar sensors had an additional grid between the entrance and retarding grids in order to protect inner grids from ion bombardment during electron measurements. The other significant feature of these two sensors was that a small positive collector bias could be applied to assure adequate access of thermal electrons to the collector. With the retarding grid at constant zero volt, current changes could be observed for 3-second periods to obtain gradients of ion concentration. Electron parameters were measured in a manner similar to ions. Ions in mass range 1 to 4, 14 to 16, 24 to 32 and greater than 40 atomic mass units could be identified. The fourth sensor head was for the ion-drift velocity measurements and consisted of four grounded grids, a negatively biased suppressor grid, and a 4-segment collector. Differences in various collector segment currents provided ion-drift directional component information.

=== Solar Extreme Ultraviolet Spectrophotometer (EUVS) ===
The Extreme Ultraviolet Spectrometer (EUVS) was used to observe the variations in the solar EUV flux in the wavelength range from 140 to 1850 Angstrom (A) and the atmospheric attenuation at various fixed wavelengths. This provided quantitative atmospheric structure and composition data. The instrument consisted of 24 grazing-incidence grating monochromators, using parallel-slit systems for entrance collimation and photoelectric detectors at the exit slits. Twelve of these monochromators had wavelength scan capability, each with 128 selectable wavelength positions, which could also automatically step-scan through these positions. The other 12 monochromators operated at fixed wavelengths with fields of view smaller than the full solar disk to aid in the atmospheric absorption analysis. The spectral resolution varied from 2 to 54 A depending upon the particular instrument. The field of view varied from 60 x 60 arc-minute down to 3 x 6 arc-minute. All 24 monochromator-entrance axes were co-aligned parallel. A solar point system could point to 256 different positions, execute a 16-step one-dimensional scan or a full 256-step raster. The time resolution varied from 0.5 seconds for observing 12 fixed wavelengths up to 256 seconds for programming the EUVS through all possible modes.

=== Ultraviolet Nitric-Oxide Experiment (UVNO) ===
This Ultraviolet Nitric-Oxide Experiment (UVNO) consisted of a two-channel fixed-grating Ebert-Fastie spectrometer, which measured the airglow in the (1, 0) gamma band in a 15-A region centered at 2149 A. The observed intensity was produced by resonance fluorescence of sunlight by the nitric-oxide molecules in the instrument's field of view. The intensity data obtained yielded altitude profiles of nitric oxide density as a function of time and location. The remote sensing character of the UVNO experiment permitted measurements of nitric oxide to be made at altitudes both above and below satellite perigee. As the spacecraft spun, the spectrometer, which looked outward through the rim of the satellite, repeatedly had its field of view carried down through the atmosphere onto the earth's limb, and altitude profiles of the emitted airglow intensity were obtained. Below some altitude, the measured signal at 2149 A was contaminated by rayleigh-scattered sunlight. To correct for this contamination, a second channel measured only scattered light intensity in a 12-A region centered at 2190 A. The two channels were optically and electrically independent. Nitric oxide airglow intensity was determined by taking the difference between these two measurements. The sensor's spherical fused-quartz telescope mirror had a 125-mm focal length, and focused incident light on the entrance slit of the spectrometer. From this slit, the light struck one-half of the mirror and was collimated onto the grating. The 3600-lines-per-mm grating returned the light collimated to the other half of the mirror, and the light was focused on two exit slits. The spectrometer field of view was 4° X 0.25°, with the long axis parallel to the spacecraft's spin axis, and therefore parallel to the viewed limb. In normal operation, each channel was integrated for 20.8 ms and read out alternately at 10.4-ms intervals. The instrument was protected against contamination from internal scattering of off-axis undispersed light.

=== Visible Airglow Photometer (VAE) ===
The visible airglow experiment provided volume emission rates for several dayglow, nightglow, and auroral optical emission features. A photometer containing two separate optical channels was used. Spectral selection was accomplished with a common filter wheel that contained six interference filters and a dark and calibrate position. The wavelengths measured in pairs (in Angstroms) were 7319 and 4861, 5200 and dark, 5577 and 7319, 4278 and 5200, 6300 and 5577, calibration and 4278, and 4861 and 6300. The two channels were separated in angle by 90°. One channel had a large field of view (3° half-angle) for high sensitivity, normally pointing toward the local zenith, and the second channel had a small field of view (0.75° half-angle) for high spatial resolution, pointing tangent to the surface of the Earth when the satellite was in the despun mode. Both channels were protected from stray light contamination during daytime by multistage baffle systems. Photons that had been spectrally and spatially selected were sensed by a pulse-counting photomultiplier system capable of counting at a rate of 5.E6 counts/seconds. The filters could be operated in several modes, e.g. fixed filter, and automatic filter changes could be synchronized either to satellite orientation or to a fixed-time base.

== End of mission ==
The polar orbit provided the sampling of all latitudes and the perigee moved through all latitudes in 3 months and all local times in 4 months. Unfortunately, a failure in the solar power panels resulted in the termination of operations on 29 January 1976, after slightly less than 4 months of useful life. However, all the regions at the perigee altitudes were sampled during this time. The spacecraft re-entered the atmosphere about 1 month after cessation of telemetry. To continue the correlated observations with the Explorer 55 (AE-E) mission, Explorer 51 (AE-C) was reactivated on 28 February 1976 to replace Explorer 54 (AE-D).

== See also ==
- Explorer 17 (AE-A)
- Explorer 32 (AE-B)
- Explorer 51 (AE-C)
- Explorer 55 (AE-E)
- Explorer program
