= Delta J =

American expendable launch vehicle

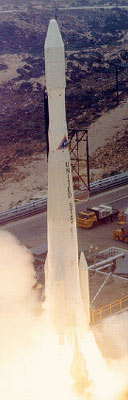
- Launch of the Delta J with Explorer 38
- Function: Expendable launch system
- Country of origin: United States

Launch history
- Status: Retired
- Launch sites: Vandenberg, SLC-2E
- Total launches: 1
- Success(es): 1
- UTC date of spacecraft launch: 4 July 1968

The Delta J or Thor-Delta J was an American expendable launch system of the late 1960s. Only one was launched, with the Explorer 38 spacecraft. It was a member of the Delta family of rockets.

The Delta J was derived from the Delta E. The first stage was a Thor missile in the DSV-2C configuration, with three Castor-1 solid rocket boosters clustered around it. A Delta E was used as the second stage. The Altair third stage of the Delta E was replaced with the more powerful Star 37D SRM.

The only Delta J to fly was launched from Vandenberg Air Force Base, Space Launch Complex 2E on 4 July 1968. It successfully placed the Explorer 38 satellite into medium Earth orbit.

== See also ==
- Expendable launch system
- PGM-17 Thor
- Delta (rocket family)
