= Explorer 17 =

US satellite

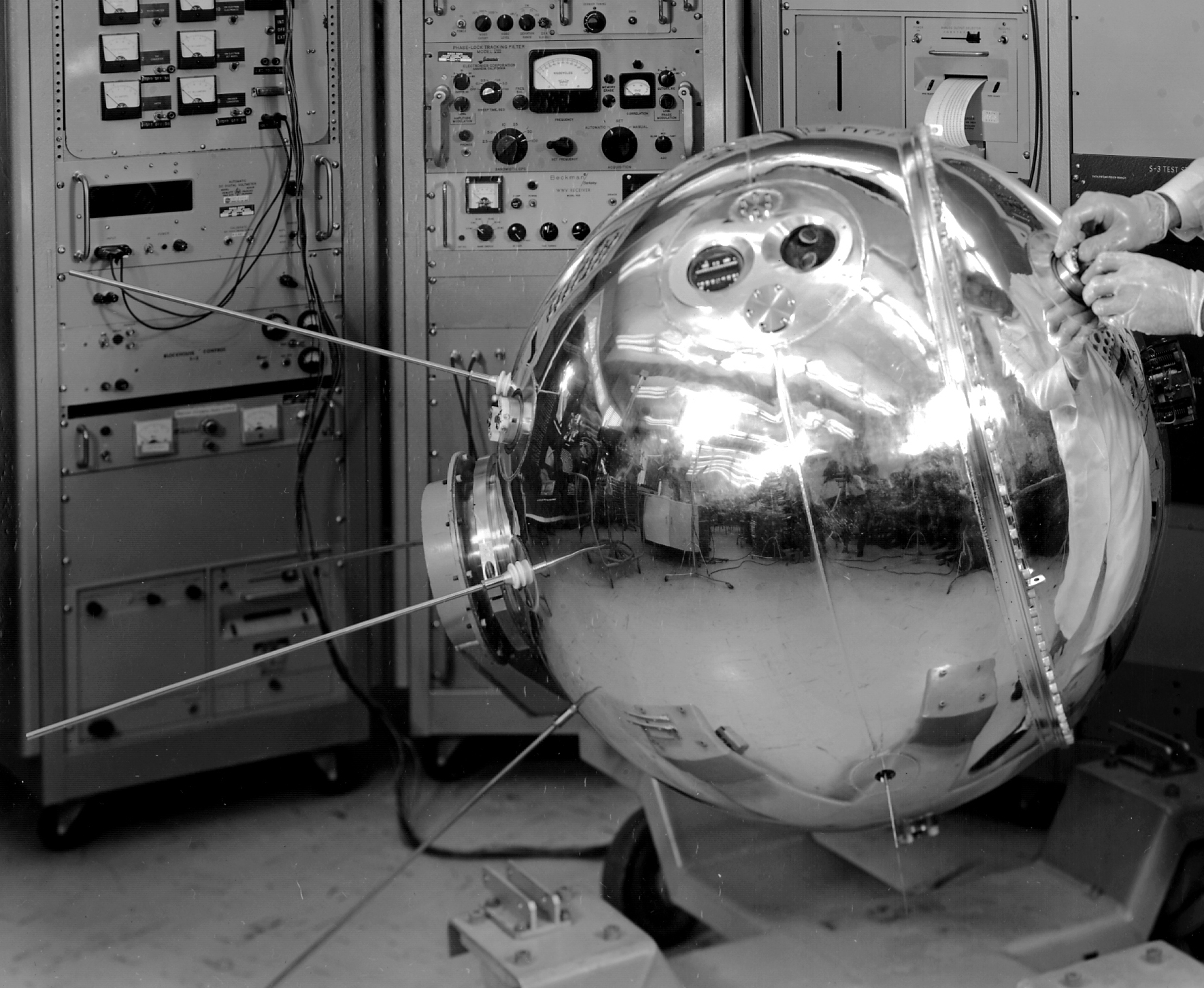
- Explorer-17 satellite
- Names: AE-A; Atmosphere Explorer-A; S6
- Mission type: Earth science
- Operator: NASA
- COSPAR ID: 1963-009A
- SATCAT no.: 00564
- Mission duration: 98 days (achieved)

Spacecraft properties
- Spacecraft: Explorer XVII
- Spacecraft type: Atmosphere Explorer-A
- Bus: AE
- Manufacturer: Goddard Space Flight Center
- Launch mass: 183.7 kg (405 lb)
- Dimensions: 0.95 m (3 ft 1 in) diameter
- Power: Nickel-cadmium batteries

Start of mission
- Launch date: 3 April 1963, 02:00:02 GMT
- Rocket: Delta-B (Thor 357 / Delta 017)
- Launch site: Cape Canaveral, LC-17A
- Contractor: Douglas Aircraft Company
- Entered service: 3 April 1963

End of mission
- Last contact: 10 July 1963
- Decay date: 24 November 1966

Orbital parameters
- Reference system: Geocentric orbit
- Regime: Low Earth orbit
- Perigee altitude: 255 km (158 mi)
- Apogee altitude: 916 km (569 mi)
- Inclination: 57.60°
- Period: 96.39 minutes

Instruments
- Langmuir Probes; Mass spectrometers Pressure gauges

Explorer 17 (also known as Atmosphere Explorer-A (AE-A) and S6) was a NASA satellite, launched at Cape Canaveral from LC-17B on a Delta B launch vehicle, on 3 April 1963, at 02:00:02 GMT, to study the Earth's upper atmosphere. It was the first satellite of five in the "Atmosphere Explorer" series.

== Mission ==
The successful launch and operating of Explorer 17 allowed scientists for the first time to obtain instantaneous atmospheric density measurements using several independent measuring systems, to measure the atmosphere during a single day under nearly constant local time conditions and geomagnetic activity, and to compare direct measurements of density with those inferred from measurements of perturbations in the satellite period orbit.

== Spacecraft ==
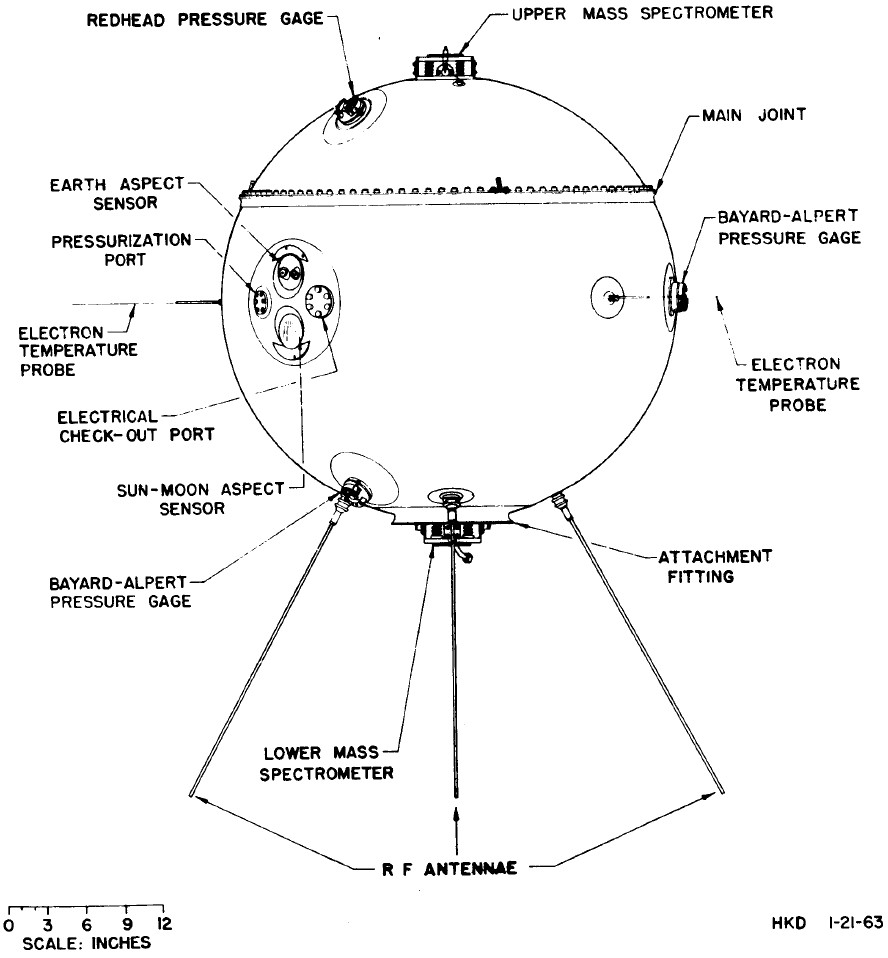
Scheme of Explorer 17

Explorer 17 was a spin-stabilized sphere 0.95 m (3 ft 1 in) in diameter. The spacecraft was vacuum sealed in order to prevent contamination of the local atmosphere.

== Instruments ==
Explorer 17 carried four pressure gauges for the measurement of total neutral particle density, two mass spectrometers for the measurement of certain neutral particle concentrations, and two electrostatic probes for ion concentration and electron temperature measurements. Battery power failed on 10 July 1963. Three of the four pressure gauges and both electrostatic probes operated normally. One spectrometer malfunctioned, and the other operated intermittently.

== Experiments ==
=== Langmuir Probes ===
The Explorer 17 experiment payload included two independent Langmuir probe systems. One of the sensors was used to provide measurements of the positive ion density, and the other measured electron temperature. Each system used a two-element sensor consisting of an outer cylindrical guard electrode 10 cm (3.9 in) long which was concentric with an inner collector electrode 0.056 cm (0.022 in) in diameter and 23 cm (9.1 in) long. The potentials of the electrodes were varied with respect to the satellite shell. The electron temperature probe was swept at a rate of 10 sweeps per second over two different voltage intervals, 0 to 0.75 V and 0 to 1.5 V. The ion density probe was swept from -3 to +2 Volts in 2 seconds. The currents to the collectors were measured and telemetered. The ion concentration and electron temperature could be determined from the current versus voltage information. The experiment operated normally from launch until 10 July 1963, when the spacecraft batteries failed.

=== Mass Spectrometers ===
Two identical double-focusing magnetic mass spectrometers were used to measure the concentrations of the major neutral particle constituents of the upper atmosphere, namely, atomic and molecular oxygen, atomic and molecular nitrogen, helium, and water vapor. These neutral particles were ionized by electron bombardment. Measurements of the six different ion currents and the total current were made sequentially for 4 seconds in high sensitivity and 4 seconds in low sensitivity. A period of 64 seconds was required for the entire measurement cycle. Included in the cycle was an operation to correct any DC drift of the zero voltage level in the output signal. One spectrometer produced useless data due to a malfunction. The other detector system experienced intermittent degeneration of the amplifier output, and, consequently, the data were good only during certain periods. This degeneration was not a result of instrument malfunction but of an unexpected spacecraft attitude which oriented the sensor toward the Sun and caused it to overheat.

=== Pressure Gauges ===
Two Redhead (cold cathode) and two Bayard-Alpert (hot filament) ionization vacuum gauges were used to measure the neutral particle density and ambient pressure of the upper atmosphere between 260 km (160 mi) and 900 km (560 mi). The pressure gauges were operated for 4-minutes periods when the satellite was within range of a ground telemetry station. The neutral particles were ionized by electron bombardment, and the resulting ion currents were detected and converted to voltages suitable for telemetry. These two types of sensors together were capable of measuring over the pressure range 10.E-4 torr (10.E12 molecules/cc) to 10.E-11 torr. One Bayard-Alpert gauge suffered a loss in sensitivity, and no useful data were obtained from it. The remaining three gauges operated normally.

== Orbital decay ==
The spacecraft decayed from orbit after 1,325 days on 24 November 1966.

== See also ==
- Explorer 32 (AE-B)
- Explorer 51 (AE-C)
- Explorer 54 (AE-D)
- Explorer 55 (AE-E)
- Explorer program
