= Explorer 32 =

NASA satellite of the Explorer program

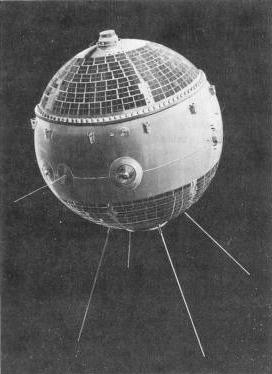
- Explorer 32 satellite
- Names: AE-B; Atmosphere Explorer-B
- Mission type: Earth science
- Operator: NASA
- COSPAR ID: 1966-044A
- SATCAT no.: 02183
- Website: Explorer 32
- Mission duration: 10 months (achieved)

Spacecraft properties
- Spacecraft: Explorer XXXII
- Spacecraft type: Atmosphere Explorer
- Bus: AE
- Manufacturer: Goddard Space Flight Center
- Launch mass: 224.5 kg (495 lb)
- Power: Silver zinc batteries and Solar cells

Start of mission
- Launch date: 25 May 1966, 14:00:00 GMT
- Rocket: Thor-Delta C1 (Thor 436 / Delta 038)
- Launch site: Cape Canaveral, LC-17B
- Contractor: Douglas Aircraft Company
- Entered service: 25 May 1966

End of mission
- Last contact: March 1967
- Decay date: 22 February 1985

Orbital parameters
- Reference system: Geocentric orbit
- Regime: Low Earth orbit
- Perigee altitude: 276 km (171 mi)
- Apogee altitude: 2,725 km (1,693 mi)
- Inclination: 64.67°
- Period: 116.00 minutes

Instruments
- Electron Temperature and Density; Ion Mass Spectrometer; Neutral Particle Magnetic Mass Spectrometer; Pressure Gauges; Satellite Drag Atmospheric Density

Explorer 32, also known as Atmosphere Explorer-B (AE-B), was a NASA satellite launched by the United States to study the Earth's upper atmosphere. It was launched from Cape Canaveral on a Delta C1 launch vehicle, on 25 May 1966. It was the second of five "Atmosphere Explorer", the first being Explorer 17. Though it was placed in a higher-than-expected orbit by a malfunctioning second stage on its launch vehicle, Explorer 32 returned data for ten months before failing due to a sudden depressurization. The satellite reentered the Earth's atmosphere on 22 February 1985.

== Background ==
Explorer 32 was built by Goddard Space Flight Center, as a successor to Explorer 17, which it strongly resembled, to directly measure the temperature, composition, density, and pressure of the upper atmosphere. Its main differences from the prior satellite were the addition of a tape recorder for data storage, solar cells to charge onboard batteries, a magnetic torquer to stabilize the satellite's spin, and a 3-axis fluxgate magnetometer for sensing the satellites aspect (facing) in orbit.

== Spacecraft ==
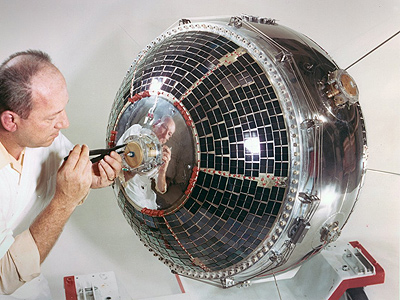
Scientist working on satellite using a tool on the presumed front of the craft.

Explorer 32 was a stainless steel, vacuum-sealed sphere, of 0.889 m (2 ft 11.0 in) in diameter. It carried one ion spectrometer, two neutral mass spectrometers, three magnetron density gauges, and two electrostatic probes. It used a tape recorder to save data that was acquired when the satellite was not in range of one of the 13 ground stations. It was powered by silver zinc batteries and a solar cell array mounted on the satellite exterior.

== Experiments ==
=== Electron Temperature and Density ===
The objective of this experiment was to measure the distribution of electron temperature and densities from 10.E3 to 10.E6 electrons/cc using a swept voltage electron probe.

=== Ion Mass Spectrometer ===
This experiment was designed to obtain a description of the concentrations of the ion species in the topside ionosphere (principally atomic hydrogen, helium, nitrogen, and oxygen), as a function of time, location, and solar and geomagnetic activity.

The spectrometer sensor consisted of a 5-3 cycle ceramic tube with 5-mm grid spacing and an external guard ring assembly. Two RF frequencies, 3.7 and 9.0 MHz, were used with a trapezoidal-shaped sweep voltage to cover the ion mass range 12 to 19, and 1 and 4 atomic mass units (u) assuring detection of the primary ionic constituents of the topside ionosphere. An experiment turn-on consisted of one complete mass scan in 208-seconds followed by recycling of the sweep voltage and a second measurement of the high mass range. The stopping potential and the guard ring potential controlled the sensitivity of the spectrometer, and each voltage was commandable from the ground. The ion current reaching the spectrometer was measured by a series of five-decade amplifiers with a particle sensitivity range of from about 10 x 1.E6 ions/cc. An automatic calibrator functioned once during each turn-on to supply two known signals to the amplifier system and to the sweep monitor. Amplifier characteristics were calculated from the response to these pulses. The spectrometer tube was mounted on the equator of the almost spherically shaped spacecraft. The spacecraft spin period and attitude were magnetically controlled so that the spin axis remained essentially normal to the orbit plane and, consequently, the spectrometer orifice was aligned with the satellite velocity vector once each rotation. The spin rate was 29 ±1 rpm. Since the mass range was scanned slowly compared with the spin period, each peak in the ion spectrum was modulated at the spin frequency, with the ion current maxima occurring when the angle between the spectrometer axis and velocity vector was a minimum.

=== Neutral Particle Magnetic Mass Spectrometer ===
Two double-focusing magnetic mass spectrometers were used to measure the composition of the neutral (uncharged) atmosphere between 285 km (177 mi) and 1,000 km (620 mi). One was mounted on the equator of the spherical satellite normal to the spin axis, and the other was mounted on the top of the satellite parallel to the spin axis. The neutral particles were ionized by electron bombardment and separated according to mass-to-charge ratio (M/Q) in the analyzer section of the instrument. There was one collector cup for each of seven different ion species. An electrometer amplifier, which had two sensitivity ranges differing by a factor of 100, sampled the seven collectors sequentially. The dwell time on a specific mass and sensitivity range was 2.4-seconds. The first four of the fifteen 2.4-seconds steps of a cycle were devoted to correcting any zero drift of the electrometer and to recording the low- and high-sensitivity zero levels. The ion currents were then measured in high sensitivity for M/Q equal to 2 (molecular hydrogen), 4 (helium), and 14 (atomic nitrogen) and in high and low sensitivity for M/Q equal to 28 (molecular nitrogen), 32 (molecular oxygen), 16 (atomic oxygen), and 18 (water vapor). The time for one complete cycle was 36-seconds. The experiment was designed to work in 4-minutes intervals, during which it would return real-time data when in range of a ground station, or store the data on tape recorder until one was available.

=== Pressure Gauges ===
Three cold-cathode magnetron type density gauges (Redhead ionization gauges), each with its own high voltage supply and output electrometer, were flown to measure the density of the neutral atmosphere as a function of altitude, time, latitude, and solar and geomagnetic activity. One gauge was designated as NRC-528 and the other two as GCA-R5 to reflect different origins. Mounted on the satellite equator was one gauge of each designation, with the third gauge mounted 55° above the equator. The metal-ceramic GCA-R5 gauges had an internal magnetic field of about 0.1 T and contained radioactive material deposited on the anode to permit operation at low atmospheric densities (less than 10^{−17} g/cm^{3}) with the anode potential fixed at 3500 volts. The GCA-R5 equatorially mounted gauge had a linear range switchable electrometer output, and high-resolution current measurements were obtained. The remaining two gauge outputs were through logarithmic electrometers. All electrometers were calibrated once each turn-on. The time resolution of the measurements was 2-seconds, which was equal to the satellite spin period and corresponded to a spatial resolution of 6 km (3.7 mi) along the orbit path.

=== Satellite Drag Atmospheric Density ===
Because of its symmetrical shape, Explorer 32 was selected by the experimenters for use in determining upper atmospheric density as a function of altitude, latitude, season, and solar activity. This experiment was planned prior to launch. Density values near perigee were deduced from sequential observations of the spacecraft position, using optical (Baker-Nunn camera network) and radio and/or radar tracking techniques. This experiment resulted in the successful determination of reasonable density values.

== Mission ==
Explorer 32 was launched on 25 May 1966 at 14:00:00 GMT from LC-17B by a Thor-Delta C1 launch vehicle. The second stage did not cut off when commanded, instead continuing for an additional eight seconds until its propellant was exhausted. This resulted in the satellite ending up in a much higher apogee orbit than intended (1,688 km (1,049 mi) versus 750 km (470 mi)—similar overthrusts had occurred with Thor-Delta in the launches of TIROS-9 and GEOS-A. Nevertheless, the satellite returned usable data.

Electronic malfunctions of the logic of the two spectrometers caused one instrument to fail after just 4 days in orbit and the other after 7 days, but good data was received until then.

Explorer 32 returned data from its other experiments over the next 10 months, at which point Explorer 32 suffered a depressurization which led to battery failure; NASA determined the cause to be either meteoroid strike or weld rupture of the spacecraft's shell. On 3 March, one of the electron temperature probes was disabled, but the other probe and the ion mass spectrometer operated well until 22 March. The probe went silent on 26 March, and ground support was terminated 31 March.

The satellite reentered the Earth's atmosphere on 22 February 1985.

== Results and legacy ==
With all mission objectives achieved, Explorer 32 was declared a success in December 1966. Papers based on satellite data were first presented at the 17-20 April 1967 meeting of the American Geophysical Union in Washington D.C., additional results being reported at London's COSPAR meetings in July.

Ion mass spectrometer data were acquired in real time by 13 ground stations and over remote areas by use of a spacecraft tape recorder. The useful satellite lifetime of 10 months permitted a global study of the diurnal variation of the atmosphere during nearly two complete diurnal cycles, since the orbit plane precessed one revolution each 5.5 months. With the data obtained, several studies were undertaken including: (1) the diurnal and seasonal variation of atmospheric ion composition, (2) the effect of atmospheric winds on the atomic hydrogen-atomic oxygen ion transition level, (3) the density and temporal variation of thermospheric atomic hydrogen, and (4) the altitude variation of ion composition in the midlatitude trough region. The instrument flown was similar in design to ion spectrometers flown on the Orbiting Geophysical Observatory (OGO) satellite series.

Satellite measurements of neutral particle and electron density provided direct evidence that gravity waves in the thermosphere's F region are in part responsible for the wave-like structure of its electron density.

When the satellite was near perigee, it was observed by networks of ground-based Baker-Nunn cameras, as well as being tracked by radio and radar. By measuring the change of the satellite's orbit due to atmospheric drag, it was determined that the models derived from Explorer 17 had been off by 35%, mostly due to calibration errors. Thus, Explorer 32 afforded a much improved map of air density at an altitude of around 260 km (160 mi). This information proved even more useful when combined with the data set of OV3-2, an U.S. Air Force satellite in orbit concurrently.

== See also ==
- Explorer 17 (AE-A)
- Explorer 51 (AE-C)
- Explorer 54 (AE-D)
- Explorer 55 (AE-E)
- 1966 in spaceflight
- Explorer program
