= Explorer 55 =

NASA satellite of the Explorer program

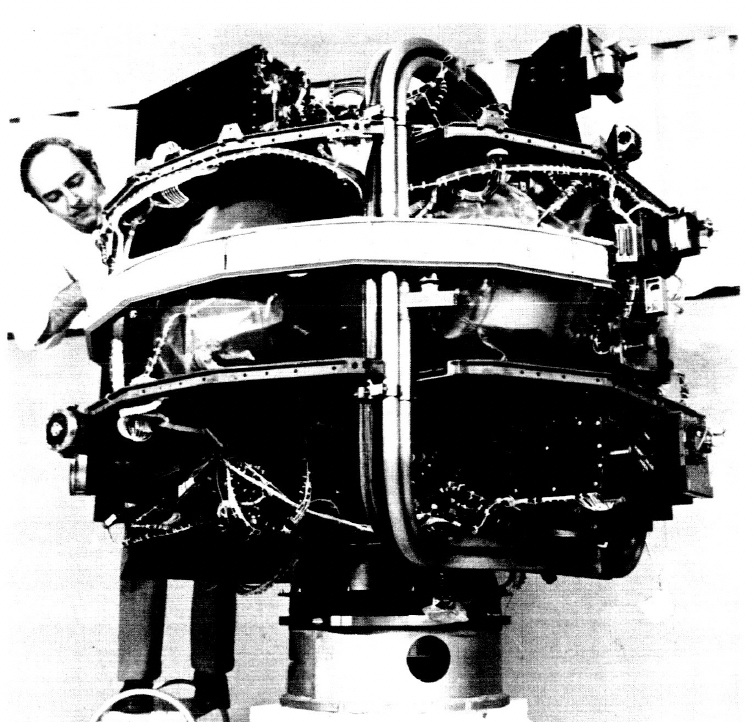
- Image of the Explorer 55 (AE-E)
- Names: AE-E; Atmosphere Explorer-E
- Mission type: Earth science
- Operator: NASA
- COSPAR ID: 1975-107A
- SATCAT no.: 08440
- Mission duration: 5.75 years (achieved)

Spacecraft properties
- Spacecraft: Explorer LIV
- Spacecraft type: Atmosphere Explorer
- Bus: AE
- Manufacturer: Goddard Space Flight Center
- Launch mass: 735 kg (1,620 lb)

Start of mission
- Launch date: 20 November 1975, 02:06:48 UTC
- Rocket: Thor-Delta 2910 (Thor 604 / Delta 117)
- Launch site: Cape Canaveral, LC-17B
- Contractor: Douglas Aircraft Company
- Entered service: 20 November 1975

End of mission
- Decay date: 10 June 1981

Orbital parameters
- Reference system: Geocentric orbit
- Regime: Low Earth orbit
- Perigee altitude: 156.0 km (96.9 mi)
- Apogee altitude: 2,983.0 km (1,853.6 mi)
- Inclination: 19.70°
- Period: 117.29 minutes

Instruments
- Miniature Electrostatic Accelerometer (MESA); Bennett Ion-Mass Spectrometer (BIMS); Backscatter Ultraviolet Spectrometer (BUV); Capacitance Manometer; Cold Cathode Ion Gauge; Cylindrical Electrostatic Probe (CEP); Energy Analyzer Spectrometer Test (EAST); Extreme Solar UV Monitor (ESUM); Neutral Atmosphere Composition (NACE); Neutral Atmosphere Temperature (NATE); Open-Source Neutral Mass Spectrometer; Photoelectron Spectrometer (PES); Radiation Damage; Retarding Potential Analyzer/Drift Meter; Solar Extreme Ultraviolet Spectrophotometer (EUVS); Temperature Alarm (Spacecraft); Visible Airglow Photometer (VAE)

Explorer 55, also known as AE-E (Atmosphere Explorer-E), was a NASA scientific satellite belonging to the Atmosphere Explorer series launched on 20 November 1975 from Cape Canaveral Air Force Station (CCAFS) aboard a Thor-Delta 2910 launch vehicle.

== Mission ==
The purpose of the Explorer 55 (AE-E) mission was to investigate the chemical processes and energy transfer mechanisms that control the structure and behavior of the atmosphere of Earth and ionosphere in the region of high absorption of solar energy at low and equatorial latitudes. The simultaneous sampling at higher latitudes was carried out by the Explorer 54 (AE-D) spacecraft until its failure on 29 January 1976, and then by Explorer 51 (AE-C), until it reentered on 12 December 1978. The same type of spacecraft as Explorer 51 was used, and the payload consisted of the same types of instruments except that the low-energy electron and ultraviolet (UV) nitric oxide experiments were deleted and a backscatter UV spectrometer was added to monitor the ozone content of the atmosphere.

The 2 experiments that were deleted were more appropriate for the high-latitude regions. The perigee swept through more than 6 full latitude cycles and two local time cycles during the first year after launch when the orbit was elliptical and the perigee height was varied between 130 km (81 mi) and 400 km (250 mi). The circularization of the orbit around 390 km (240 mi) was made on 20 November 1976 and the spacecraft was raised to this height whenever it would decay to about 250 km (160 mi).

== Experiments ==
=== Miniature Electrostatic Accelerometer (MESA) ===
The Miniature Electrostatic Analyzer (MESA) obtained data on the neutral density of the atmosphere in the altitude range of 120 km (75 mi) to 400 km (250 mi), by the measurements of satellite deceleration due to aerodynamic drag, which is directly proportional to atmospheric density. The instrument consisted of three single-axis accelerometers, mounted mutually at right angles, two in the spacecraft X-Y plane and the other along the Z-axis. The instrument determined the applied acceleration from the electrostatic force required to recenter a proof mass. The output of the device was a digital pulse rate proportional to the applied acceleration. The sample time of each instrument was 0.25 seconds. The measurements allowed the determination of the density of the neutral atmosphere, monitored the thrust of the "Orbit-Adjust Propulsion System" (OAPS), determined the satellite minimum altitude, measured spacecraft roll, and provided some attitude-sensing information. Spacecraft nutations of less than 0.01° were monitored. The instrument had three sensitivity ranges: 8.E-3 Earth's gravity (G) in OAPS monitor mode; 4.E-4 G between 120 km (75 mi) (± 2%) and 280 km (170 mi) (± 10%); and 2.E-5 G between 180 km (110 mi) (± 2%) and 400 km (250 mi) (± 10%). Numbers in parentheses represent errors. There may be a systematic error of up to ± 5% due to drag coefficient uncertainty. The highest measurement altitude was determined assuming the instrument could sense to 0.2% of full scale.

=== Backscatter UV Spectrometer (BUV) ===
The Backscatter Ultraviolet instrument (BUV) monitored the spatial distribution of atmospheric ozone by measuring the intensity of the UV radiation backscattered from the Earth's atmosphere. To obtain this ozone distribution, the BUV subsystem measured direct solar radiation and backscattered UV radiation from the daytime Sun-illuminated atmosphere. The instrument consisted of a spectrometer (monochromator) and a photometer. The monochromator measured the intensity of UV radiation backscatter and reflected radiation from the Earth's atmosphere in 12 wavelengths (2555 to 3398 A) in which ozone attenuation occurs. The photometer measured the reflected UV radiation in a single wavelength span in which attenuation by ozone does not occur. The BUV had four operating modes.

=== Bennett Ion-Mass Spectrometer (BIMS) ===
This experiment was flown to measure, throughout the orbit, the individual concentrations of all thermal ion species in the mass range 1 to 72 atomic mass units (u) and in the ambient density range from 5 to 5.E6 ions/cc. The mass range was normally scanned in 1.7 seconds, but the scan time per range could be increased by command. Laboratory and inflight determination of spectrometer efficiency and mass discrimination permitted direct conversion of measured ion currents to ambient concentrations. Correlation of these measured data with the results from companion experiments, CEP (1975-107A-01) and RPA (1975-107A-04) permitted individual ion concentrations to be determined with high accuracy. The experiment's four primary mechanical components were guard ring and ion-analyzer tube, collector and preamplifier assembly, vent, and main electronics housing. A three-stage Bennett tube with 7- to 5-cycle drift spaces was flown; it was modified to permit ion concentration measurements to be obtained at low altitudes. The balance between ion-current sensitivity and mass resolution in a Bennett spectrometer may be altered by changing appropriate voltages. These voltage changes were controlled independently by ground command for each one of the three mass ranges: 1 to 4, 2 to 18, and 8 to 72.

=== Capacitance Manometer ===
The capacitance manometer flown on Explorer 55 (AE-E) was primarily an engineering experiment to provide data on spacecraft operations. However, data from this experiment were also correlated with accelerometer and ion gauge data in evaluating satellite drag. The manometer, also referred to as Pressure Sensor B (PSB), provided a direct measure of atmospheric pressure in the region below 200 km (120 mi). The accuracy of the PSB gauge varied from about 10% at 120 km (75 mi) to about 40% at 180 km (110 mi). The PSB consisted of two spherical, thermally controlled chambers, separated by a thin membrane stretched flat and under radial tension. Any deflection of the diaphragm caused by a pressure differential between the two sides caused a change in capacitance between the diaphragm and an adjacent electrode which biased an AC bridge circuit. Air was allowed into one of the chambers through two ports 180° apart and perpendicular to the spacecraft spin axis. Thus the wake-ram pressure differential was sampled twice each spacecraft revolution.

=== Cold Cathode Ion Gauge ===
The cold cathode ion gauge was primarily an engineering experiment to provide data on spacecraft operation. However, data from this experiment were correlated with accelerometer and capacitance manometer data to evaluate satellite drag performance. The ion gauge, also referred to as Pressure Sensor A (PSA), measured atmospheric pressure in the region between 120 km (75 mi) and 370 km (230 mi) above the Earth's surface for values of atmospheric pressure between 1.3E-3 and 1.3E-7 mb. The estimated accuracy of the PSA was ± 20%. The cylindrically shaped sensor package consisted of a wedge-shaped orifice, a cathode near ground potential, an anode operating at about 130 VDC, and a permanent magnetic field of about 0.16t (1600 gauss). The gauge contained no primary source of ionizing electrons. The discharge was initiated by field emission and was self-sustaining at a pressure above 1.3E-7 mb. The ion current was collected at the cathode. The sensor was mounted on the spacecraft, with the orifice perpendicular to the spacecraft spin axis, which was normal to the orbital plane. The instrument was operated in two modes, spinning and despun. When the spacecraft was in a spinning mode, the PSA alternately sampled the ram and wake pressure. When the spacecraft was in the despun mode, the PSA paced 30° from the direction of motion. Data from this experiment were not tape-recorded but observed in real-time.

=== Cylindrical Electrostatic Probe (CEP) ===
The CEP consisted of two identical instruments designed to measure electron temperatures, electron and ion concentrations, ion mass, and spacecraft potential. One probe was oriented along the spin axis of the spacecraft (usually perpendicular to the orbit plane), and the other radially, so that it could observe in the direction of the velocity vector once each 15-second spin period. Each instrument was a retarding-potential Langmuir probe device that produced a current-voltage (I-V) curve for a known voltage pattern placed on the collector. Electrometers were used to measure the current. There were two systems of operation (one with two modes and another with three modes) using collector voltage patterns between plus and minus 5 volts. Most modes involved an automatic or fixed adjustment of collector voltage limits (and/or electrometer output) such that the region of interest on the I-V profile provided high resolution. Each system was designed for use with only one of the probes, but they could be interswitched to provide backup redundancy. The best measurements in the most favorable modes provided 1-second time resolution; electron temperature between 300K and 10,000K (10% accuracy); ion density between 10,000 and 10,000,000 ions/cc (10-20% accuracy); electron density between 50 and 1,000,000 electrons/cc; and ion mass at ion densities above 10,000. Each probe had a collector electrode extending from the central axis of a cylindrical guard ring. The 2.5 cm (0.98 in)-long guard ring was at the end of a 25 cm (9.8 in) boom, and the collector extended another 7.5 cm (3.0 in) beyond the guard ring. The boom, guard, and collector were 0.2 cm (0.079 in) in diameter.

=== Energy Analyzer Spectrometer Test (EAST) ===
This experiment was a flight test of an energy analyzer spectrometer.

=== Extreme Solar UV Monitor (ESUM) ===
The Extreme Solar Ultraviolet Monitor (ESUM) experiment made absolute broadband spectro-radiometric measurements of the solar EUV flux from 200 A to Lyman-alpha at 1216 A and made precise measurements of the temporal variability. The instrument consisted of two identical windowless EUV photodiodes with aluminum oxide cathodes and a filter wheel containing two sets of unbacked metallic filters (aluminum, tin, indium) and an open position. A visible light diode measured the pinhole transmittance of the filters to determine the white light background. The tilt angle of the instrument relative to the +Z spacecraft axis was optimized for the maximum viewing time of the Sun in both spinning and despun spacecraft modes. The instrument's field of view was 60°. The nominal bandwidths in Angstroms for 50% of the signal were 270 to 550, 570 to 584, 800 to 935, and 1216 A.

=== Neutral Atmosphere Composition (NACE) ===
This experiment measured in situ the spatial distribution and temporal changes of the concentrations of the neutral atmospheric species. In addition, new insight into in situ measurement techniques was obtained from comparisons of these measurements with those obtained from other onboard experiments; namely, open source spectrometer (1975-107A-07), solar EUV spectrometer (1975-107A-06), and atmospheric density accelerometer (1975-107A-02). The mass-spectrometer sensor had a gold-plated stainless steel thermalizing chamber and ion source, a hyperbolic rod quadrupole analyzer, and an off-axis electron multiplier. When operating in the "normal" format, the analyzer measured all masses in the range of 1 to 44 atomic mass units with emphasis on hydrogen, helium, oxygen, nitrogen and argon. Another format was optimized for minor constituent studies of gas species in the measured range. Spatial resolution was determined primarily by the mode of spacecraft operation. In orbit, the pre-sealed spectrometer was opened, and the atmospheric constituents passed through a knife-edged orifice into the thermalization chamber and ion source. Selected ions left the quadrupole analyzer through a weak focusing lens and were accelerated into an electron multiplier, where they were turned 90° to strike the first dynode. The spectrometer had a resolution of better than 1 unit for all masses between 1 and 44, and the measurement system had a planned dynamic range of approximately 100,000,000. There was provision for the instrument orifice to be covered during spacecraft thruster operations.

=== Neutral Atmosphere Temperature (NATE) ===
This experiment was designed to measure the kinetic temperature of the neutral atmosphere by determining the instantaneous density of molecular nitrogen in a spherical chamber coupled to the atmosphere through a knife-edged orifice. Analysis of the measured molecular nitrogen density variation over a spin cycle with a knowledge of the satellite's motion and orientation led to a determination of the ambient temperature, independent of scale height. Measurements of the ambient neutral composition were obtained when the instrument was commanded into the appropriate mode. Approximate values for the meridional wind were obtained from the measurement of the "stream" position relative to the satellite velocity. An alternate measurement of neutral temperature was also undertaken, using a baffle inserted in front of the orifice to intercept a portion of the gas-particle stream entering the chamber. When the satellite was in the despun mode, the baffle was made to oscillate in a stepwise fashion in order to interrupt the particle stream seen by the orificed chamber. These chamber density variations were interpreted to yield the neutral gas kinetic temperature too. A dual-filament ion source sampled the thermalized molecular nitrogen in the chamber and produced an ion beam density proportional to the nitrogen chamber density. From the source, this ionized nitrogen beam was directed into a quadrupole analyzer, tuned to pass those particles with a mass-to-charge ratio of 28. The beam then struck an electron multiplier, and the output pulses were amplified and counted. The sensor was vacuum-sealed prior to launch and opened to the atmosphere after the spacecraft was in orbit.

=== Open-Source Neutral Mass Spectrometer ===
The objective of this experiment was to contribute to a study of the chemical, dynamic, and energetic processes that control the structure of the thermosphere by providing direct in situ measurements of both major and minor neutral atmospheric constituents having masses in the range from 1 to 48 atomic mass units (u). A double-focusing, Mattauch-Herzog magnetic deflection mass spectrometer with an impact ion source was flown. Two ion collectors were included to measure ions differing in mass by a factor of 8; i.e. the two mass ranges covered were 1 to 6 and 6 to 48 units. In the ion source, the neutral species were ionized by means of electron impact. The electron energies were selectable; 75 eV for the high-eV mode and 25 eV for the low-eV mode. At altitudes greater than 380 km (240 mi), ion currents were measured with an electron multiplier. Counts were accumulated for 1/20 seconds before automatically switching to a different mass number. While complete mass spectra could be swept, in the common mode of operation peak stepping was employed; readings on principal peaks in the mass spectrum were repeated approximately every 0.5 seconds and on other species less frequently. Data below 380 km (240 mi) were measured using an electrometer. In addition to the peak stepping mode, there were several other operating modes which were selected by ground command. In the fly-through mode, ambient particles striking the ion source retained energies less than 0.1 eV, which was not high enough to overcome the negative space charge potential holding the ions in the beam. Those ambient particles that did not strike the ion source retained their incoming energy of several eV after ionization and escaped into the acceleration region of the analyzer.

=== Photoelectron Spectrometer (PES) ===
This experiment was designed to provide information on the intensity, angular distribution, energy spectrum, and net flow along field lines, of electrons in the thermosphere with energies between 1 and 500 eV. The instrument consisted of two identical oppositely directed hemispherical electrostatic analyzers and contained 30 operating modes. Each spectrometer had a relative energy resolution of ± 2.5% and a geometric factor on the order of 0.001 cm^{2} (0.00016 sq in)-sr, independent of electron energy. Three separate energy ranges could be measured: 0 to 25, 0 to 100, and 0 to 500 eV. Measurements from these intervals could be sequenced in five different ways. Data could be taken from either sensor separately, or alternately with time resolution varying from 0.25 to 8 seconds. There were two deflection voltage scan rates determined by the spacecraft clock. This voltage was changed in 64 steps and was done at 4 or 16 steps per telemetry frame. With 16 frames/s, this allowed a choice of either one 64-point spectrum or four 16-point spectra in one second. The longest (8 seconds) cycle of data involved observations using increasing voltage steps for the lowest, middle, lowest, and then highest energy ranges (in that order) for 1 second each. A repeat for decreasing voltage steps completed the cycle.

=== Radiation Damage ===
This engineering experiment measured radiation damage to semiconductor devices.

=== Retarding Potential Analyzer/Drift Meter ===
This experiment was designed to determine vector ion drift velocities, ion concentration and temperature, total ion concentration roughness, and spacecraft potential. The experiment consisted of a retarding potential analyzer with four planar sensor heads. The sensor heads were spaced nearly equally around the satellite equator. Since the satellite spin axis was perpendicular to the orbit plane, these heads could observe along the spacecraft velocity vector in either the spin or despun mode of the spacecraft. Three of the sensor heads were similar. They had two grounded entrance grids, two retarding grids, a suppressor grid, a shield grid, and a collector. A linear sweep voltage (32 or 22 to 0 V, up or down) was normally applied to the retarding grids in 0.75 s. Interpretation of the resulting current-voltage profiles provided the ion temperature, the ion and electron concentration, some ion composition information, and vehicle potential and plasma drift velocity parallel to the velocity vector. With the retarding grid at constant zero volts, current changes could be observed for 3-s periods to obtain gradients of ion concentration. Electron parameters were measured in a manner similar to ions. Ions in mass range 1 to 4, 14 to 16, 24 to 32 and greater than 40 atomic mass units could be identified. The fourth sensor head was for the ion-drift velocity measurements and consisted of four grounded grids, a negatively biased suppressor grid, and a four-segment collector. Differences in the collector segments' currents provided ion-drift directional component information.

=== Solar Extreme Ultraviolet Spectrophotometer (EUVS) ===
The Extreme Ultraviolet Spectrometer (EUVS) was used to observe the variations in the solar EUV flux in the wavelength range from 140 to 1850 A and the atmospheric attenuation at various fixed wavelengths. This provided quantitative atmospheric structure and composition data. The instrument consisted of 24 grazing-incidence grating monochromators, using parallel-slit systems for entrance collimation and photoelectric detectors at the exit slits. Twelve of these monochromators had wavelength scan capability, each with 128 selectable wavelength positions, which could also automatically step-scan through these positions. The other 12 monochromators operated at fixed wavelengths with fields of view smaller than the full solar disk to aid in the atmospheric absorption analysis. The spectral resolution varied from 2 to 54 A depending upon the particular instrument. The field of view varied from 60 x 60 down to 3 x 6 arc-minutes. All 24 monochromator-entrance axes were co-aligned parallel. A solar pointing system could point to 256 different positions and execute a 16-step one-dimensional scan or a full 256-step raster. The time resolution varied from 0.5 s for observing 12 fixed wavelengths up to 256 s for programming the EUVS through all possible modes.

=== Temperature Alarm (Spacecraft) ===
This engineering experiment was a temperature alarm that measured the impact temperature at low perigees.

=== Visible Airglow Photometer (VAE) ===
This experiment provided detailed data on the rates of excitation of the atomic and molecular constituents of the thermosphere. The wavelength range, expressed in Angstroms, was measured in pairs: 7319 and 6563, 5300 and dark, 5577 and 7319, 2800 and 5200, 6300 and 5577, calibrate and 2800, and 6563 and 6300. A photometer was used which contained two separate optical channels, a narrow field of view and a wide field of view. Spectral selection was accomplished with a filter wheel that contained six interference filters and a dark and calibrated position. The two channels were separated by 90°. One channel had a 3° half-angle cone field of view for high sensitivity and pointed normally toward the local zenith. The second had a field of view of 0.75° half cone for high spatial resolution, pointing tangentially to the surface of the Earth when the satellite was in the oriented mode. Both channels were protected from stray light contamination during the daytime with multistage baffle systems. Filters were operated in several modes. The two separate optical channels were monitored at time intervals consistent with their angular resolution in the spinning mode.

== Spacecraft end of life ==
Explorer-55 (AE-E) reentered the atmosphere on 10 June 1981.

== See also ==
- Explorer 17 (AE-A)
- Explorer 32 (AE-B)
- Explorer 51 (AE-C)
- Explorer 54 (AE-D)
- Explorer program
