= Explorer 51 =

NASA satellite of the Explorer program

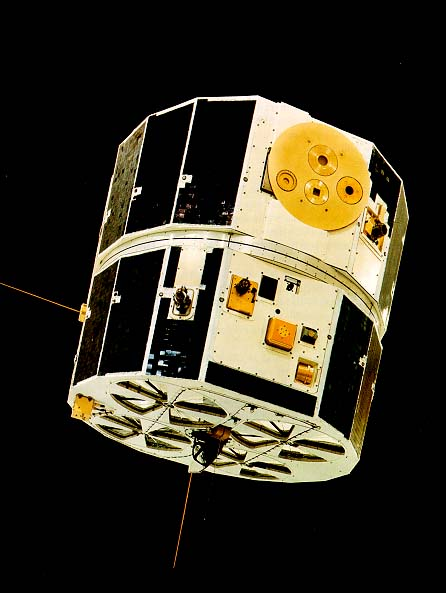
- Explorer 51 satellite
- Names: AE-C; Atmosphere Explorer-C
- Mission type: Earth science
- Operator: NASA
- COSPAR ID: 1973-101A
- SATCAT no.: 06977

Spacecraft properties
- Spacecraft: Explorer LI
- Spacecraft type: Atmosphere Explorer
- Bus: AE
- Manufacturer: Goddard Space Flight Center
- Launch mass: 658 kg (1,451 lb)
- Dimensions: 140 cm (55 in) diameter

Start of mission
- Launch date: 16 December 1973, 06:18:00 UTC
- Rocket: Thor-Delta 1900 (Thor 585 / Delta 099)
- Launch site: Vandenberg, SLC-2W
- Contractor: Douglas Aircraft Company
- Entered service: 16 December 1973

End of mission
- Decay date: 12 December 1978

Orbital parameters
- Reference system: Geocentric orbit
- Regime: Medium Earth orbit
- Perigee altitude: 149 km (93 mi)
- Apogee altitude: 4,294 km (2,668 mi)
- Inclination: 68.10°
- Period: 132.30 minutes

Instruments
- Miniature Electrostatic Accelerometer (MESA); Bennett Ion-Mass Spectrometer (BIMS); Capacitance Manometer; Closed-Source Neutral Mass Spectrometer; Cold Cathode Ion Gauge; Cylindrical Electrostatic Probes (CEP); Extreme Solar Ultraviolet Monitor (ESUM); Low-Energy Electrons (LEE); Magnetic Ion-Mass Spectrometer (MIMS); Neutral Atmosphere Temperature (NATE); Open-Source Neutral Mass Spectrometer; Photoelectron Spectrometer (PES); Retarding Potential Analyser/Drift Meter (RPA); Temperature Alarm; Ultraviolet Nitric-Oxide (UVNO); Visible Airglow Photometer (VAE)

Explorer 51, also known as AE-C (Atmospheric Explorer-C), was a NASA scientific satellite belonging to the Atmosphere Explorer series launched on 16 December 1973, at 06:18:00 UTC, from Vandenberg aboard a Delta 1900 launch vehicle.

== Spacecraft ==
The AE-C spacecraft was a multi-sided polyhedron with a diameter of approximately 140 cm (55 in). It weighed 658 kg (1,451 lb) including 85 kg (187 lb) of instrumentation. The initial elliptical orbit was altered many times in the first year of life by means of an onboard propulsion system employing a 1.6 kg (3.5 lb) thruster. The purpose of these changes was to alter the perigee height to 129 km (80 mi). After this period, the orbit was circularized and was raised periodically to about 390 km (240 mi) when it would decay to 250 km (160 mi) altitude. During the first year, the latitude of perigee moved from about 10° up to 68° north and then down to about 60° south. During this period about two cycles through all local times were completed. The spacecraft could be operated in either of two modes: spinning at a nominal 4 rpm or despun to 1 revolution per orbit. The spin axis was perpendicular to the orbit plane. Power was supplied by a solar cell array. The spacecraft used a PCM telemetry data system that operated in real-time or in a tape recorder mode. The payload included instrumentation for the measurement of solar ultraviolet; the composition of positive ions and neutral particles; the density and temperature of neutral particles, positive ions and electrons; the measurement of airglow emissions, photoelectron energy spectra, and proton and electron fluxes up to 25 keV.

== Mission ==
The purpose of the Explorer 51 mission was to investigate the thermosphere, with emphasis on the energy transfer and processes that govern its state. The study of photochemical processes accompanying the absorption of solar UV radiation in the Earth's atmosphere was accomplished by making closely coordinated measurements of reacting constituents and the solar input.

The data from Explorer 51 served, among other things, to obtain the angular load distribution around the satellite and compare it with the data of Explorer 32 and model the hydroxyl ion emissions in the Earth's atmosphere.

== Instruments ==
The satellite carried instruments to measure ultraviolet solar radiation, temperature, composition and density of the positive ions, of the neutral particles and of the electrons, to measure atmospheric glow emissions, the energy spectra of the photoelectrons and the protons and electrons flows with energies up to 25 keV.

== Experiments ==
=== Miniature Electrostatic Accelerometer (MESA) ===
The miniature electrostatic analyzer (MESA) obtained data on the neutral density of the atmosphere in the altitude range of 120 to 400 km (75 to 249 mi) from the measurements of satellite deceleration due to aerodynamic drag. The instrument consisted of three single-axis accelerometers, mounted mutually at right angles, two in the spacecraft X-Y plane and the other along the Z-axis. The instrument determined the applied acceleration from the electrostatic force required to recenter a proof mass. The output of the device was a digital pulse rate proportional to the applied acceleration. The measurements allowed determination of the density of the neutral atmosphere, monitored the thrust of the orbit-adjust propulsion system (OAPS), determined the satellite minimum altitude, measured spacecraft roll, and provided some attitude-sensing information. Spacecraft nutations of less than 0.01° were monitored. The instrument had three sensitivity ranges: 8.E-3 Earth's gravity (G) in OAPS monitor mode; 4.E-4 G between 120 km (75 mi) (± 2%) and 280 km (170 mi) (± 10%); and 2.E-5 G between 180 km (110 mi) (± 2%) and 400 km (250 mi) (± 10%). Numbers in parentheses represent errors; in addition, there may be a systematic error of up to ± 5% due to drag coefficient uncertainty. The highest measurement altitude was determined assuming the instrument could sense to 0.2% of full scale.

=== Bennett Ion-Mass Spectrometer (BIMS) ===
This experiment was flown to measure, throughout the Explorer 51 (AE-C) orbit, the individual concentrations of all thermal ion species in the mass range of 1 to 72 atomic mass units (u), and in the ambient density range from 8.E1 to 5.E6 ions/cc. Any combination of the following three mass ranges, expressed in units, were selected by ground command: range A, -1 to 4, range B, -2 to 18, range C, -8 to 72. Each range was normally scanned in 1.7 seconds (approximately 12 km (7.5 mi) along orbit). Normal operation consisted in sequence ABCABC (1 to 72 units in 5.1 seconds). Laboratory and inflight determination of spectrometer efficiency and mass discrimination permitted direct conversion of measured ion currents to ambient concentrations. The experiment's four primary mechanical components were the guard ring and ion-analyzer tube, collector and preamplifier assembly, vent, and main electronics housing. The guard ring was normally at ground potential, but it could be placed at -6 volts by command if desirable, e.g., if the spacecraft acquired a positive charge. A three-stage Bennett tube with 7 to 5-cycle drift spaces was flown and was modified to permit ion concentration measurements to be obtained at low altitudes. The frequency of the 30-volt peak-to-peak Radio Frequency (RF) voltage varied with the mass range measured: range A, -10 MHz, range B, -5 MHz, and range C, -2.5 MHz. Primary analog instrument output was a compressed ion current spectrum which displayed the full dynamic range of the amplifier system on a single telemetry channel. Onboard data processing provided a readout of primary experiment data in the form of two digital words for each peak in the ion spectrum. One 8-bit word indicated peak amplitude (current) and the other 8-bit word identified sweep position, i.e., species identification.

=== Capacitance Manometer ===
The capacitance manometer was primarily an engineering experiment to provide data on spacecraft operations. However, data from this experiment were also correlated with accelerometer and ion gauge data in evaluating satellite drag. The manometer, also referred to as pressure sensor B (PSB), measured atmospheric pressure in the region below 200 km (120 mi). The accuracy of the PSB gauge varied from about 10% at 120 km (75 mi) to about 40% at 180 km (110 mi). The PSB consisted of two spherical, thermally controlled chambers, separated by a thin membrane stretched flat and under radial tension. Any deflection of the diaphragm caused by a pressure differential between the two sides caused a change in capacitance between the diaphragm and an adjacent electrode which was measured by an Alternating current (AC) bridge circuit. Air was permitted into one of the chambers through two ports 180° apart and perpendicular to the spacecraft spin axis. Thus, the wave-ram pressure differential was sampled twice for each spacecraft revolution.

=== Closed-Source Neutral Mass Spectrometer ===
This experiment measured in situ the spatial distribution and temporal changes of the concentrations of the neutral atmospheric species. In addition, new insight into in situ measurement techniques was obtained from comparisons of these measurements with those obtained from other on-board experiments; namely, open source spectrometer (1973-101A-07), solar Extreme ultraviolet (EUV) spectrophotometer (1973-101A-06), and density accelerometer (1973-101A-02). The mass-spectrometer sensor had a gold-plated stainless steel thermalizing chamber and ion source, a hyperbolic-rod quadrupole analyzer, and an off-axis electron multiplier. Five different sequences of mass selections were available and, expressed in atomic mass units (u), were: (a) geophysical -1, 2, 4, total, 16, 28, 32, selected, 40, (b) analytical -12, 14, 18, 20, 22, 30, 44, calibrate, zero, (c) individual -selected, selected, selected, ... (any mass 1 to 44), (d) sweep digital -1, 2, 3, 4, 5, ... 45 (in 3/16 units steps), (e) sweep analog -2, 3, 4, 5, ... 45 (continuous). Five operational formats were available and selected by ground command, and each one contained a different combination of the five mass selection sequences listed above. When operating in the "normal format", the analyzer measured all masses in the range 1 to 44 with emphasis on hydrogen, helium, oxygen, nitrogen and argon. Another format was optimized for minor constituent studies of any individual gas species in the measured range. Spatial resolution was determined primarily by the mode of spacecraft operation. In orbit, the pre-sealed spectrometer was opened, and the atmospheric constituents passed through a knife-edged orifice into the thermalization chamber and ion source. Selected ions left the quadrupole analyzer through a weak focusing lens and were accelerated into a 14-stage electron multiplier, where they were turned 90° to strike the first dynode. For each impacting ion, the multiplier output was a pulse of 2.E6 electrons. These output pulses constituted the measurement, and the count rate was proportional to the chamber density of the selected species. These density values were then converted to ambient concentrations. The analyzer normally operated at a resolution of 1 unit (u) over the mass range. Pulses occurring during 0.015-second integration intervals were accumulated in a 16-bit counter. Multiple integration periods (up to 16) were assigned to each measurement for less dense atmospheric species. Automatically selected ranges of ionizing electron currents were used. The overall dynamic range of the measurements was greater than 1.E7.

=== Cold Cathode Ion Gauge ===
The cold cathode ion gauge flown on Explorer 51 (AE-C) was primarily an engineering experiment to provide data on spacecraft operation. However, data from this experiment was correlated with accelerometer and capacitance manometer data to evaluate satellite drag performance. The ion gauge, also referred to as pressure sensor A (PSA), measured atmospheric pressure in the region between 120 km (75 mi) and 370 km (230 mi) above the Earth's surface for values of atmospheric pressure between 1.3E-3 to 1.3E-7 mb. The estimated accuracy of the PSA was ± 20%. The cylindrically shaped sensor package consisted of a wedge-shaped orifice, a cathode near ground potential, an anode operating at about 1300 VDC, and a permanent magnetic field of about 1600 gauss. The gauge contained no primary source of ionizing electrons. The discharge was initiated by field emission and was self-sustaining at a pressure above 1.3E-7 mb. The ion current was collected at the cathode. The sensor was mounted on the spacecraft, with the orifice perpendicular to the spacecraft spin-axis which was normal to the orbital plane. The instrument could be operated in two modes, spinning or despun. When the spacecraft was in a spinning mode, the PSA alternately sampled the ram and wake pressure. When the spacecraft was in the despun mode, the PSA faced 30° from the direction of motion. Data from this experiment were not tape-recorded but were observed in real-time.

=== Cylindrical Electrostatic Probes (CEP) ===
The CEP consisted of two identical instruments designed to measure electron temperatures, electron and ion concentrations, ion mass, and spacecraft potential. One probe was oriented along the spin axis of the spacecraft (normally perpendicular to the orbit plane), and the other radially so that it could observe in the direction of the velocity vector once each 15-second spin period. Each instrument was a retarding potential Langmuir probe device that produced a current-voltage (I-V) curve for a known voltage pattern placed on the collector. Electrometers were used to measure the current. There were two systems of operation (one with two modes and another with three modes) using collector voltage patterns between plus and minus 5 volts. Most modes involved an automatic or fixed adjustment of collector voltage limits (and/or electrometer output) such that the region of interest on the I-V profile provided high resolution. Each system was designed for use with only one of the probes, but they could be interswitched to provide backup redundancy. The best measurements in the most favorable modes provided 1-second time resolution; electron temperature between 300K and 10,000K (10% accuracy); ion density between 10,000 and 10,000,000 ions/cc (10-20% accuracy); electron density between 50 and 1,000,000 electrons/cc; and ion mass at ion densities above 10,000 ions/cc. Each probe had a collector electrode extending from the central axis of a cylindrical guard ring. The 2.5 cm (0.98 in)-long guard ring was at the end of a 25 cm (9.8 in) boom, and the collector extended another 7.5 cm (3.0 in) beyond the guard ring. The boom, guard, and collector were 0.2 cm (0.079 in) in diameter.

=== Extreme Solar Ultraviolet Monitor (ESUM) ===
The Extreme Solar Ultraviolet Monitor (ESUM) made absolute broadband spectro-radiometric measurements of the solar EUV flux from 200 Angstrom (A) to Lyman-alpha at 1216 A and made precise measurements of the temporal variability - approximately 1% per solar rotation. The instrument consisted of two identical windowless EUV photodiodes with aluminum oxide cathodes and a filter wheel containing two sets of unbacked metallic filters (aluminum, tin, indium) and an open position. A visible light diode measured the pinhole transmittance of the filters to determine the white light background. The tilt angle of the instrument relative to the +Z spacecraft axis was optimized for the maximum viewing time of the Sun in both spinning and despun spacecraft modes. The instrument field of view was 60°. The nominal bandwidths (for 50% of signal) were 270 to 550 A, 570 to 584 A, 800 to 935 A, and 1216 A.

=== Low-Energy Electrons (LEE) ===
This experiment provided direct measurements of the energy input into the upper atmosphere due to electrons and protons in the energy range of 0.2 to 25 keV. The experiment acquired differential measurements of the energy influx and angular distribution. There were two detectors measuring electrons and protons from 0.2 to 25 keV in 16 logarithmically spaced steps, and one detector measuring 5 keV electrons continuously. Each detector consisted of a cylindrical electrostatic analyzer for species and energy selection and a Spiraltron electron multiplier for particle detection. Energy distributions were obtained by applying different fixed or stepped voltages to the deflection plates. Distributions in angle were measured using the spacecraft spin and the analyzers' positions on the spacecraft. In the despun modes, measurements were obtained at 45° to the spacecraft equator, and radially away from the Earth. Detector look angles were chosen to give optimum magnetic pitch-angle coverage when the spacecraft was moving either poleward or equatorward. All detectors were identical in construction and used 1- x 6-mm entrance apertures. Counts were accumulated over 55.7ms and read out each main telemetry frame (62.5ms). The two-stepped detectors moved one energy step once each main frame with the same accumulation time, requiring about 1 second for a complete cycle of steps.

=== Magnetic Ion-Mass Spectrometer (MIMS) ===
A magnetic ion-mass spectrometer was flown to measure in situ the concentrations of the ambient ion species in the mass range from 1 to 90 atomic mass units (u). It was mounted on the satellite equator normal to the spin axis, and the entrance aperture faced forward when the spacecraft was in the despun mode. The electric and magnetic fields were arranged to produce a mass spectrum along the focal plane following the magnetic analyzer. Three slits were placed along the focal plane in appropriate places to simultaneously collect ions in the mass ratios 1 to 4 to 16. Ionospheric ions were accelerated into the analyzer system by a negative voltage that varied from -1060 to -225 volts. The three mass ranges measured simultaneously were 1 to 4, 4 to 16, and 16 to 90 units. Following each slit was an electron multiplier and a logarithmic electrometer-amplifier detector. The detector output could be measured directly for an analog output, or it could be fed to a "peak" circuit that determined the amplitude of each peak in the spectrum. Only the amplitude of each peak was telemetered in the primary peaks mode, and in this mode the time required to simultaneously sweep all three mass ranges was 1 second. Other modes of operation were possible. In the analog short mode, the three mass ranges were swept in 4 seconds, alternating with 1-second "peaks" mode scans. An 8-second sweep was required in the analog long mode, again alternating with a 1-second peak mode scan. An option existed in the locked mode to continuously measure any set of mass numbers in the ratio 1 to 4 to 16 to give high spatial resolution.

=== Neutral Atmosphere Temperature (NATE) ===
This experiment measured the kinetic temperature of the neutral atmosphere by determining the instantaneous density of molecular nitrogen in a spherical chamber coupled to the atmosphere through a knife-edged orifice. Analysis of the measured molecular nitrogen density variation over a spin cycle with a knowledge of the satellite's motion and orientation led to a determination of the ambient temperature, independent of scale height. A measurement of the ambient nitrogen density was also obtained. An alternate measurement of neutral temperature was also undertaken, using a baffle inserted in front of the orifice to intercept a portion of the gas particle stream entering the chamber. When the satellite was in the despun mode, the baffle was made to oscillate in the stepwise fashion to interrupt the particle stream seen by the orificed chamber. These chamber density variations were interpreted to yield the neutral gas kinetic temperature. A dual-filament ion source sampled the thermalized molecular nitrogen in the chamber and produced an ion beam density proportional to the nitrogen chamber density. From the source, this ionized nitrogen beam was directed from a quadrupole analyzer, tuned to pass those particles whose mass-to-charge ratio (M/Q) is 28, on to an electron multiplier. The output pulses were amplified and counted in a 16-bit accumulator. The experiment also provided measurements of neutral atmospheric composition, when commanded into the appropriate mode and, for the first time measured the local wind (vertical motions). The wind values were determined by measurement of the "stream" position relative to the satellite velocity. When the spacecraft was in the despun mode, the nitrogen density was measured except when the particle stream was interrupted by the baffle. The sensor was vacuum-sealed prior to launch and opened to the atmosphere after the spacecraft was in orbit.

=== Open-Source Neutral Mass Spectrometer ===
The objective of this experiment was to contribute to a study of the chemical, dynamic, and energetic processes that control the structure of the thermosphere by providing direct, in situ measurements of both major and minor neutral atmospheric constituents having masses in the range from 1 to 48 atomic mass units (u). A double-focusing Mattauch-Herzog magnetic deflection mass spectrometer with an impact ion source was flown. Two ion collectors were included to measure ions differing in mass by a factor of 8, i.e. the two mass ranges covered were 1 to 6 units and 6 to 48 units. In the ion source, the neutral species were ionized by means of electron impact. At altitudes greater than 380 km (240 mi), ion currents were measured with an electron multiplier counting individual ions. Counts were accumulated for 1/20-second before automatically switching to a different mass number. While complete mass spectra could be swept, in the common mode of operation peak stepping was employed, with readings on the principal peaks in the mass spectrum being repeated approximately every 0.5 seconds and on other species less frequently. Data below 380 km (240 mi) were measured using an electrometer. In addition to the peak stepping mode, there were several other operating modes which were selected by ground command. In the fly-through mode, the ion source voltages were adjusted so that there was no electric field to draw ions out of the electron beam when they were formed. Ambient particles striking the ion source retained energies less than 0.1-eV, which was not high enough to overcome the negative space charge potential holding the ions in the beam. Those ambient particles that did not strike the ion source retained their incoming energy of several eV after ionization and escaped into the accelerating region of the analyzer. The electron accelerating potential was 75 eV in normal mode operation and was 25 eV in the fly-through mode. In another operating mode, the instrument switched automatically to a sequence of masses of particular interest such as, e.g. between masses 16 and 32 or between masses 28 and 32.

=== Photoelectron Spectrometer (PES) ===
This experiment was designed to provide information on the intensity, angular distribution, energy spectrum, and net flow along field lines, of electrons in the thermosphere with energies between 1 and 500 eV. The instrument consisted of two identical oppositely directed hemispherical electrostatic analyzers and 30 operating modes. Each spectrometer had a relative energy resolution of ± 2.5% and a geometric factor on the order of 0.001 cm^{2} sr, independent of electron energy. Three separate energy ranges could be sensed: 0 to 25, 0 to 100, or 0 to 500 eV. Measurements from these intervals could be sequenced in five different ways. Data could be taken from either sensor separately, or alternately with time resolution varying from 0.25- to 8-seconds. There were two deflection voltage scan rates determined by spacecraft clock. This voltage was changed in 64 steps and was done at 4 or 16 steps per telemetry frame. With 16 frames/s, this allowed a choice of either one 64-point spectrum or four 16-point spectra in 1 second. The longest (8-second) cycle of data involved observations using increasing voltage steps for the lowest, middle, lowest, then highest energy ranges (in that order) for 1 second each. A repeat for decreasing voltage step completed the cycle.

=== Retarding Potential Analyser/Drift Meter (RPA) ===
This experiment was designed to determine vector ion drift velocities, ion concentration and temperature, and spacecraft potential. An ionospheric irregularity index was also obtained from the ion concentration sensor. The experiment consisted of a retarding potential analyzer with four planar sensor heads. The sensor head used for ion drift measurements was co-located with another head, and all were spaced nearly equally, looking outward from the satellite equator. Since the satellite spin axis was perpendicular to the orbit plane, these heads could observe along the spacecraft velocity vector in either the spin or despun mode of the spacecraft. The primary objective of this experiment was to provide accurate ion temperatures with other measurements being of secondary importance. Three of the sensor heads were similar. They had two grounded entrance grids, two retarding grids, a suppressor grid, a shield grid, and a collector. A linear sweep voltage (32 or 22 to 0 volts, up or down) was normally applied to the retarding grids in 0.75 seconds. Interpretation of the resulting current-voltage profiles provided the ion temperature, the ion and electron concentration, some ion composition information, vehicle potential and plasma drift velocity parallel to the velocity vector. Two of the three similar sensors had an additional grid between the entrance and retarding grids in order to protect inner grids from ion bombardment during electron measurements. The other significant feature of these two sensors was that a small positive collector bias could be applied to assure adequate access of thermal electrons to the collector. With the retarding grid at constant zero volts, current changes could be observed for 3-second periods to obtain gradients of ion concentration. Electron parameters were measured in a manner similar to ions. Ions in mass ranges 1 to 4, 14 to 16, 24 to 32 and greater than 40 atomic mass units could be identified. The fourth sensor head was for the ion-drift velocity measurements and consisted of four grounded grids, a negatively biased suppressor grid, and a four-segment collector. Differences in various collector segment currents provided ion-drift directional component information.

=== Solar EUV Spectrophotometer (EUVS) ===
The Extreme Ultraviolet Spectrometer (EUVS) was used to observe the variations in the solar EUV flux in the wavelength range from 140 to 1850 A and the atmospheric attenuation at various fixed wavelengths. This provided quantitative atmospheric structure and composition data. The instrument consisted of 24 grazing-incidence grating monochromators, using parallel-slit systems for entrance collimation and photoelectric detectors at the exit slits. Twelve of these monochromators had wavelength scan capability, each with 128 selectable wavelength positions, which could also automatically step-scan through these positions. The other 12 monochromators operated at fixed wavelengths with fields of view smaller than the full solar disk to aid in the atmospheric absorption analysis. The spectral resolution varied from 2 to 54 A depending upon the particular instrument. The field of view varied from 60 x 60 arc-minutes down to 3 x 6 arc-minutes. All 24 monochromator-entrance axes were co-aligned parallel. A solar pointing system could point to 256 different positions, execute a 16-step one-dimensional scan or a full 256-step raster. The time resolution varied from 0.5 seconds for observing 12 fixed wavelengths up to 256 seconds for programming the EUVS through all possible modes.

=== Temperature Alarm ===
This engineering experiment measured the impact temperature during low perigees.

=== Ultraviolet Nitric-Oxide (UVNO) ===
This Ultraviolet Nitric-Oxide Experiment (UVNO) consisted of a two-channel fixed-grating Ebert-Fastie spectrometer which measured the airglow in the (1, 0) gamma-band in a 15-A region centered at 2149 A. The observed intensity was produced by resonance fluorescence of sunlight by the nitric-oxide molecules in the instrument's field of view. The intensity profiles obtained yielded altitude profiles of nitric-oxide density as a function of time and location. Profiles were measured along the track of the satellite at times when it was on the sunlit side of the Earth. The remote sensing character of the UVNO experiment permitted measurements of nitric-oxide to be made at altitudes both above and below satellite perigee. As the spacecraft spun, the spectrometer, which looked outward through the rim of the satellite, repeatedly had its field of view carried down through the atmosphere onto the Earth's limb, and altitude profiles of the emitted airglow intensity were obtained. Below some altitude, the measured signal at 2149 A was contaminated by rayleigh-scattered sunlight. To correct for this contamination, a second channel measured only scattered light intensity in a 12-A region centered at 2190 A. The two channels were optically and electrically independent. Nitric-oxide airglow intensity was determined by taking the difference between these two measurements. The sensor's spherical fused-quartz telescope mirror had a 125-mm focal length, and focused incident light on the entrance slit of the spectrometer. From this slit, the light struck one-half of the Ebert mirror and was collimated onto the grating. The 3600-lines-per-mm grating returned it collimated to the other half of the mirror, and the light was focused on two exit slits. The spectrometer field of view was 4° X 1/4°, with the long axis parallel to the spacecraft's spin axis, and therefore parallel to the viewed limb. In normal operation, each channel was integrated for 20.8ms and was read out alternately at 10.4ms intervals. The instrument was protected against contamination from internal scattering of off-axis undispersed light.

=== Visible Airglow Photometer (VAE) ===
This experiment contained a filter photometer designed to measure various airglow and auroral features in the spectral range between 3000 and 7500 A. The primary information obtained from this experiment was the rates of excitation of the atomic and molecular constituents of the thermosphere. For the Explorer 51 (AE-C) mission, the following six specific lines and bands were chosen for study since they play an important role in the photochemical energy balance of the atmosphere (expressed in Angstroms): 3371, 4278, 5200, 5577, 6300, and 7319. The emissions were measured in pairs: 5577 and 6300, 7319 and calibration, 3371 and 5577, 5200 and 7319, 4278 and 3371, calibration and 5200, and 6300 and 4278. Two optical systems viewed at right angles to each other. Each one employed a combination of a simple objective lens and field stop to define the field of view, and each contained a multistage light baffle. The wide-angle high-sensitivity system (designated channel 2) had a field of view of 3° half-angle and was used to measure the nightglow, dayglow above the satellite, and other weak emission features. The less sensitive system (designated channel 1) had a field of view of approximately 0.75° half-angle and was used for dayglow and nightglow horizon measurements, as well as discrete auroral features which showed strong spatial gradients. Both optical channels had a diameter of 2.2 cm (0.87 in). They shared a filter wheel that contained six interference filters at the wavelengths identified above, and two other positions. One was a dark position for noise measurements, and the other was a calibrated position. The dynamic range of the instrument was 1.E16 photons per s m^{2} (1.E6 rayleighs). In order that the sensors would respond in a fraction of a second to large changes in surface brightness without any noticeable enhancement in the background count rate, each one contained a 1/100 attenuator and an electronic circuit to back-bias the cathode. With these protective features, it was possible to measure a dark feature with no apparent enhancement in the background within 120ms after a direct view of the sun. Photons reaching the cathode were recorded using a pulse-counting system.

== See also ==
- Explorer 17 (AE-A)
- Explorer 32 (AE-B)
- Explorer 54 (AE-D)
- Explorer 55 (AE-E)
- Explorer program
