= Explorer 47 =

NASA satellite of the Explorer program

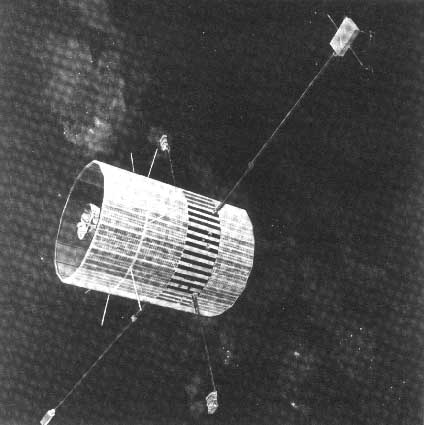
- Explorer 47 satellite
- Names: IMP-H; IMP-7; Interplanetary Monitoring Platform-7
- Mission type: Space physics
- Operator: NASA
- COSPAR ID: 1972-073A
- SATCAT no.: 06197
- Mission duration: 6 years (achieved); 52 years, 5 months, 12 days (in orbit)

Spacecraft properties
- Spacecraft: Explorer XLVII
- Spacecraft type: Interplanetary Monitoring Platform
- Bus: IMP
- Manufacturer: Goddard Space Flight Center
- Launch mass: 390 kg (860 lb)
- Dimensions: 157 cm (62 in) in height and 135 cm (53 in) in diameter
- Power: Solar cells and batteries

Start of mission
- Launch date: 23 September 1972, 01:20:00 UTC
- Rocket: Thor-Delta 1604 (Thor 579 / Delta 090)
- Launch site: Cape Canaveral, LC-17B
- Contractor: Douglas Aircraft Company
- Entered service: 23 September 1972

End of mission
- Deactivated: 31 October 1978

Orbital parameters
- Reference system: Geocentric orbit
- Regime: High Earth orbit
- Perigee altitude: 201,599 km (125,268 mi)
- Apogee altitude: 235,699 km (146,457 mi)
- Inclination: 17.20°
- Period: 17702.00 minutes

Instruments
- Charged Particle Measurements Experiment (CPME); Electrons and Hydrogen and Helium Isotopes; Energetic Electrons and Protons; Ions and Electrons in the Energy Range 0.1 to 2 MeV; Magnetic Fields Experiment; Measurement of Low-Energy Protons and Electrons; Plasma Wave; Solar and Cosmic-Ray Particles; Solar Flare High-z/Low-e and Low-e Isotope; Solar Plasma Electrostatic Analyzer; Solar Plasma Faraday Cup; Solar Wind Ion Composition; Study of Cosmic-Ray, Solar and Magnetospheric Electrons

Explorer 47 (IMP-H or IMP-7), was a NASA satellite launched as part of the Explorers program. Explorer 47 was launched on 23 September 1972 from Cape Canaveral, Florida, with a Thor-Delta 1604. Explorer 47 was the ninth overall launch of the Interplanetary Monitoring Platform series, but received the launch designation "IMP-7" because two previous "Anchored IMP" flights had used "AIMP" instead.

== Spacecraft ==
Explorer 47 continued the study begun by earlier IMP spacecraft of the interplanetary space and magnetotail regions from a nearly circular orbit, near 37 Earth radii. This 16 sided drum-shaped spacecraft was 157 cm (62 in) in height and 135 cm (53 in) in diameter, with propulsion Star-17A.

== Mission ==
Explorer 47 was designed to measure energetic particles, plasma, electric fields and magnetic fields. The spin axis was normal to the ecliptic plane, and the spin period was 1.3 seconds. The spacecraft was powered by solar cells and a chemical battery. Scientific data were telemetered at 1600 bit/s (with a secondary 400 bit/s rate available).

== Launch ==
Explorer 47 was launched on 23 September 1972, at 01:20:00 UTC, from Cape Canaveral, Florida, with a Thor-Delta 1604 launch vehicle.

== Experiments ==
=== Charged Particle Measurements Experiment (CPME) ===
Three solid-state detectors in an anticoincidence plastic scintillator observed electrons between 0.2 and 2.5-MeV, protons between 0.3 and 500-MeV, alpha particles between 2.0 and 200-MeV, heavy particles with atomic numbers ranging from 2 to 5 with energies greater than 8-MeV, heavy particles with Z values ranging between 6 and 8 with energies greater than 32-MeV, and integral protons and alpha of energies greater than 50-MeV/nucleon, all with dynamic ranges of 1 to 1E+6 particles per (cm^{2} s sr). Five thin-window Geiger–Müller tubes observed electrons of energy greater than 15-keV, protons of energy greater than 250-keV, and X-rays with wavelengths between 2 and 10 A, all with a dynamic range of 10 to 1E+8 particles per (cm^{2} s sr). Particles and X-rays (primarily of solar origin) were studied, but the dynamic range and resolution of the instrument permitted cosmic rays and magnetotail particles to be observed.

=== Electrons and Hydrogen and Helium Isotopes ===
This experiment was designed to measure solar and galactic electrons, positrons, and nuclei, and to separate isotopes from hydrogen through oxygen. The energy ranges covered were 0.16 to 5-MeV (electrons), 0.16 to 2-MeV (positrons), and about 1 to 40-MeV/nucleon for nuclei. The instrument was a telescope consisting of 11 colinear, fully depleted, silicon surface-barrier detectors inside a plastic scintillator anticoincidence shield. Four of the top five sensors were annular while the remainder were solid disks. This arrangement gave narrow geometry (anticoincidence in annular sensors) and wide geometry modes with half-angle acceptance cones of about 24° and 36°. The telescope axis was perpendicular to the spacecraft spin axis. Data returned consisted of 8-sectored and spin-integrated count rates for 8 different coincidence/anticoincidence modes and 2 parameter pulse-height analyses for 32 particles every 20.48-seconds. The coincidence mode chosen for pulse-height analysis in any 0.64-seconds interval was fixed by a five-level priority system. The principal contributors to each coincidence mode rate were: (1) 0.16- to 5-MeV electrons and 1- to 43-MeV/nucleon nuclei, (2) 1- to 5-MeV electrons and 13- to 43-MeV/nucleon nuclei, (3) neutrals and gamma rays, (4) 0.2- to 1-MeV electrons, (5) 1- to 3-MeV electrons, (6) 1.2- to 2.4-MeV/nucleon nuclei, (7) 4- to 13-MeV/nucleon nuclei and (8) electrons above 3-MeV and nuclei above 30-MeV/nucleon.

=== Energetic Electrons and Protons ===
The purposes of this investigation were: (1) to study the propagation characteristics of solar cosmic rays through the interplanetary medium over the energy ranges indicated below, (2) to study electron and proton fluxes throughout the geomagnetic tail and near the flanks of the magnetosphere, and (3) to study the entry of solar cosmic rays into the magnetosphere. The instrumentation consisted of a three-element telescope employing fully depleted surface-barrier solid-state detectors and a magnet to deflect electrons. Two sidemounted detectors were used to measure the deflected electrons. The experiment was designed to measure: (1) proton fluxes from 30-keV to >8.6-MeV in six ranges; (2) electron fluxes from 30-keV to >450-keV in three ranges; (3) charged particles with E>15-keV; (4) alpha particles >0.5-MeV, >1.6-MeV, 2.2 to 8.8-MeV and 8.8 to 35-MeV; and (5) charged particles of Z>2 and E>5-MeV.

=== Ions and Electrons in the Energy Range 0.1 to 2 MeV ===
This experiment was designed to determine the composition and energy spectra of low-energy particles associated with solar activity and interplanetary processes. The detectors used were: (1) an electrostatic analyzer (to select particles of the designated energy per charge) combined with an array of windowless solid-state detectors (to measure the energy loss) and surrounded by an anticoincidence shielding, and (2) a particle telescope consisting of a silicon surface-barrier detector and a flat two-chamber proportional counter enclosed in an anticoincidence scintillator cup. The experiment measured particle energies from 0.1 to 2 MeV per charge in 12 bands and uniquely identified positrons and electrons as well as nuclei with charges of Z from 1 to 8 (and charge group resolution for Z between 9 and 28). Two 1000-channel pulse-height analyzers, one for each element of the telescope, were included in the experiment payload. The telescope failed on 25 November 1972, when the window on the proportional counter weakened and burst due to exposure to UV radiation.

=== Magnetic Fields Experiment ===
This experiment consisted of a boom-mounted triaxial fluxgate magnetometer designed to study the interplanetary and geomagnetic tail magnetic fields. Each sensor had three dynamic ranges; ± 12, ± 36, and ± 108 nT. With the aid of a bit compaction scheme (delta modulation), 25 vector measurements were made and telemetered per second. Full-word vectors were telemetered with 320-ms resolution. The instrument functioned normally from turn-on (23 September 1972 to 28 December 1972), when the flipper mechanism failed. This rendered somewhat more difficult the determination of zero-level drift in the spin-axis sensor. The instrument continued in this state until 4 April 1973, when instrument malfunction caused a series of spacecraft under-voltage turnoffs. Data were not obtained after this time.

=== Measurement of Low-Energy Protons and Electrons ===
This experiment measured the energy spectra of low-energy electrons and protons in the geocentric range 30 to 40 Earth radii to further understand geomagnetic storms, aurora, tail and neutral sheet, and other magnetospheric phenomena. The detector was a dual-channel curved-plate electrostatic analyzer (LEPEDEA - low-energy proton and electron differential energy analyzer) with 16 energy intervals between 5 eV and 50 keV. It had an angular field of view of 9° by 25° in four directions perpendicular to the spacecraft spin axis. The detector was operated in one of two modes: (1) one providing good angular resolution (16 directions for each particle energy band) once each 272-seconds, and (2) one providing good temporal resolution in which the entire energy range in four directions was measured every 68-seconds.

=== Plasma Wave ===
Electric field components perpendicular to the spacecraft spin axis and the magnetic field component parallel to that axis were measured by an electric dipole antenna and a search coil magnetometer. Both sensors were mounted on a 305 cm (120 in) boom. Data were obtained in eight frequency channels from 10-Hz to 100 kHz in either the normal mode or the snapshot mode. Two channels, centered at 67 and 600 Hz, had 10-dB fall-off points of 17 and 150 Hz, and 270 and 810 Hz, respectively. The remaining six channels were narrow-bandwidth channels centered at 1.3, 2.3, 5.4, 10.5, 30, and 70 kHz. In the normal mode, the antenna was first sampled in a given frequency channel many times during a given measurement period (comparable to the spacecraft spin period). During the next period, the search coil was sampled many times in the same frequency channel. Next, the antenna was sampled in the next frequency channel, followed by the search coil in that channel. The frequency channels were incremented, and the sampled sensors were alternated until a full set of data was obtained in 16 measurement periods (approximately 20-seconds). In the snapshot mode, only electric field data were transmitted, as follows. The antenna was first sampled in a given frequency channel many times during a given measurement period. In the next period, the antenna was sampled in two sequences of eight frequency channels. This two-period measurement was executed eight times, each time incrementing the frequency channel studied in every other period by one. Thus, a full set of data again required 16 measurement periods. In addition, an analog mode, sampling the antenna and search coil from 10 to 100 Hz, was used in conjunction with the special purpose analog telemetry test that was to be conducted. Unfortunately, this telemetry system did not work well, and no usable data were obtained in this mode of operation. For the digital modes, some interference was experienced from the asymmetric plasma sheath associated with the solar cell arrays. This interference limited the sensitivity of the magnetic field measurements and introduced complexity into analysis of the electric field measurements.

=== Solar and Cosmic-Ray Particles ===
The Goddard Space Flight Center cosmic-ray experiment measured energy spectra, composition, and angular distribution of solar and galactic electrons, protons, and heavier nuclei up to Z=30. Three distinct detector systems were used. The first system consisted of a pair of solid-state telescopes that measured integral particle fluxes above 150, 350, and 700 keV and of protons above 0.05, 0.15, 0.70, 1.0, 1.2, 2.0, 2.5, 5.0, 15, and 25 MeV. Except for the 0.05-MeV proton mode, all counting modes had unique species identification. The second detector system was a solid-state dE/dx versus E telescope that looked perpendicular to the spin axis. This telescope measured nuclei from 1 to 16 u with energies between 4 and 20 MeV/nucleon. Counts of particles in the 0.5- to 4-MeV/nucleon range, with no charge resolution, were obtained as counts in the dE/dx, but not in the E sensor. The third detector system was a three-element CsI scintillator telescope whose axis made an angle of 39° with respect to the spin axis. The instrument responded to electrons between 2 and 12 MeV and nuclei from 1 to 30 u in the energy range 20 to 500 MeV/nucleon. For particles below 80 MeV, this instrument acted as a dE/dx detector. Above 80 MeV, it acted as a bidirectional triple dE/dx detector. Flux directionality information was obtained by dividing certain portions of the data from each detector system into eight angular sectors.

=== Solar Flare High-z / Low-e and Low-e Isotope ===
This experiment used two telescopes to measure the composition and energy spectra of solar (and galactic) particles above about 0.5 MeV/nucleon. The main telescope consisted of five colinear elements (three solid state, one CsI, and one Cherenkov sapphire) surrounded by a plastic anticoincidence shield. The telescope had a 60° full-angle acceptance cone with its axis approximately normal to the spacecraft spin axis permitting 8-sectored information on particle arrival direction. Four elements of the main telescope were pulse-height analyzed, and low- and high-gain modes could be selected by command to permit resolution of the elements Hydrogen through Nickel or of the electrons and the isotopes of Hydrogen and Helium and light nuclei. A selection-priority scheme was included to permit sampling of less abundant particle species under normal and solar-flare conditions. The low-energy telescope was essentially a two-element, shielded, solid-state detector with a 70° full-angle acceptance cone. The first element was pulse-height analyzed, and data were recorded by sectors.

=== Solar Plasma Electrostatic Analyzer ===
A hemispherical electrostatic analyzer was used to study the directional intensity of positive ions and electrons in the solar wind, magnetosheath, and magnetotail. Ions as heavy as oxygen were resolved when the solar wind temperature was low. Energy analysis was accomplished by charging the plates to known voltage levels and allowing them to discharge with known RC time constants. In the solar wind, positive ions from 200 eV to 5 keV (15% spacing, 3% resolution) and electrons from 5 eV to 1 keV (30% spacing, 15% resolution) were studied. In the magnetosheath, positive ions from 200 eV to 5 keV (15% spacing, 3% resolution) and from 200 eV to 2 keV (30% spacing, 15% resolution) and electrons from 5 eV to 1 keV (30% spacing, 15% resolution) were studied. In the magnetotail, positive ions from 200 eV to 20 keV (30% spacing, 15% resolution) and electrons from 5 eV to 1 keV (30% spacing, 15% resolution) and from 100 eV to 20 keV (15% resolution) were studied.

=== Solar Plasma Faraday Cup ===
A modulated split-collector Faraday cup, which was perpendicular to the spacecraft spin axis, was used to study the directional intensity of positive ions and electrons in the solar wind, transition region, and magnetotail. Electrons were measured in eight logarithmically equispaced channels between 17 eV and 7 keV. Positive ions were measured in eight channels between 50 eV and 7 keV. A spectrum was obtained every eight spacecraft revolutions. Angular information was obtained in either 15 equally spaced intervals during a 360° revolution of the satellite or in 15 angular segments centered more closely about the spacecraft-Sun line.

=== Solar Wind Ion Composition ===
An electrostatic analyzer and Wien-type velocity selector were used to gain exploratory data on heavy ion composition in the solar wind. The bulk velocities of 4 He++, 4 He+, 3 He++, and O (isotopes indistinguishable) ions in all ionization states were separately studied. During 30 successive spacecraft spin periods, ions of a given species were studied in 30 logarithmically equispaced bulk velocity channels from 200 to 600 km/s (120 to 370 mi/s). A complete set of measurements required about 10-minutes and consisted of 30 one-step sequences for 4 He++ ions and five 30-step sequences for each of the three other species. This was an experimental detector, and the data were considered not useful.

=== Study of Cosmic-Ray, Solar and Magnetospheric Electrons ===
This experiment studied galactic and solar electrons and positrons in the kinetic energy range 50 keV to 2 MeV. Information on protons between 0.5 and 4.0 MeV was also obtained. A collimated stilbene crystal scintillator looking perpendicular to the spacecraft spin axis served as the principal detector. A similar fully shielded crystal served to determine the contribution to the principal detector count rate of electrons and protons generated within the principal detector by gamma rays and neutrons, respectively. A fully shielded CsI crystal served as a gamma-ray spectrometer and was used in coincidence with the principal detector to distinguish electrons from positrons. Count rates from each detector obtained in eight angular sectors per revolution were telemetered. In addition, the amplitude and shape of the pulse generated in the principal detector by the first stopping particle in each appropriate telemetry frame was studied. Pulse amplitude and shape yielded energy (10% resolution) and particle species information.

== Last contact ==
The spacecraft was turned off on 31 October 1978.

== See also ==
- Explorer 43
- Explorer program
