= Enhanced Imaging System =

American reconnaissance satellite program

Enhanced Imaging System (EIS), officially referred to as "Enhanced Imagery System", previously known as 8X, and sometimes unofficially known as Misty 2 and KH-13, is an American reconnaissance satellite program. A derivative of the Improved Crystal satellites, EIS replaced Misty, and was intended to provide more coverage and dwell time than previous reconnaissance satellites; like Misty, it has stealth capabilities. Only one EIS satellite has been launched; USA-144, which was placed into orbit by a Titan IVB rocket on 22 May 1999.

== History ==
In 1995, a Los Angeles Times article reported that the 8X program was intended as "a major upgrade to the KH-12", with a mass of as much as 20 tons, which would be used for detailed imaging with a wide field of view. The cost of the program was a subject of disagreement from some within the military at the time. By 1998, the program had been renamed Enhanced Imaging System. The Future Imagery Architecture program, which was intended to replace the Lacrosse and Improved Crystal satellites, was developed alongside EIS.

== See also ==
- Corona series: KH-1, KH-2, KH-3, KH-4
- KH-5 ARGON, KH-6 LANYARD
- KH-7 and KH-8 GAMBIT
- KH-9 HEXAGON "Big Bird"
- Manned Orbital Laboratory (MOL) or KH-10
- KH-11
