= KH-9 Hexagon =

American family of spy satellites

KH-9 HEXAGON
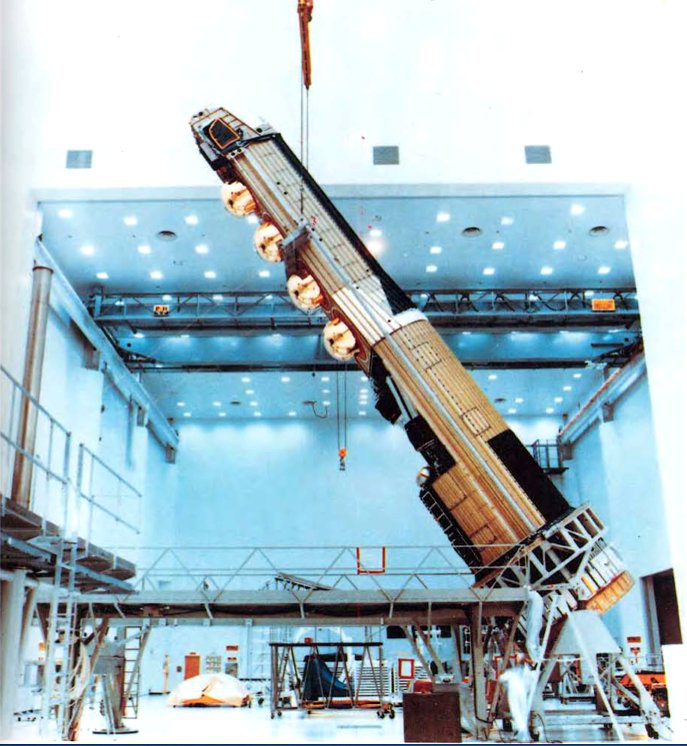
- A KH-9 HEXAGON during assembly by Lockheed
- Mission type: Imagery intelligence
- Operator: National Reconnaissance Office

Spacecraft properties
- Manufacturer: Lockheed (satellite vehicle); Perkin-Elmer (main camera); Itek (stellar and terrain cameras); Eastman Kodak (film); General Electric (MK V reentry vehicles); McDonnell Douglas (MK 8 reentry vehicles)
- Launch mass: 11400 kg to 13300 kg (with mapping camera)
- Dimensions: 16.2 m × 3.05 m (53.1 ft × 10.0 ft)

Start of mission
- Rocket: Titan III
- Launch site: Vandenberg Air Force Base, SLC-4E
- Contractor: Martin Marietta

Orbital parameters
- Reference system: Sun-synchronous orbit
- Regime: Low Earth orbit
- Perigee altitude: 170 km (110 mi)
- Apogee altitude: 260 km (160 mi)
- Inclination: 97°

Main telescope
- Type: folded Wright camera
- Diameter: 0.91 m (3 ft 0 in)
- Focal length: 1.52 m (5 ft 0 in)
- Focal ratio: f/3.0
- Wavelengths: visible light, Near-infrared
Instruments
- SPC: Stereo Panoramic Cameras
- MCS: Mapping Camera System
- SI: Stellar Index camera
- S3: Stellar Solid State Camera

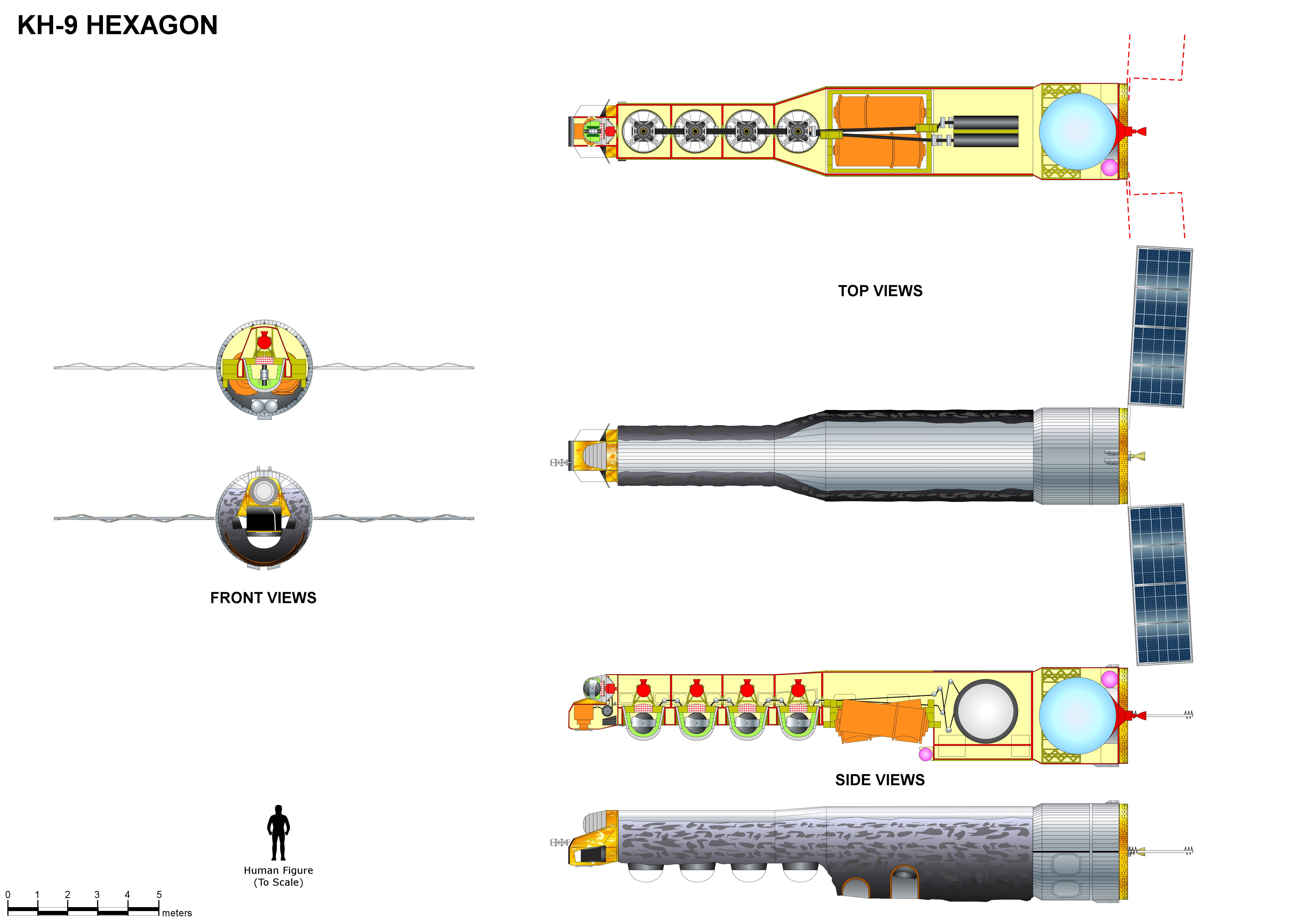
A KH-9 HEXAGON main features

KH-9 (BYEMAN codename HEXAGON), commonly known as Big Bird or KeyHole-9, was a series of photographic reconnaissance satellites launched by the United States between 1971 and 1986. Of twenty launch attempts by the National Reconnaissance Office (NRO), all but one were successful. Photographic film aboard the KH-9 was stored on RCA Astro Electronic Division take up reel system then sent back to Earth in recoverable film return capsules for processing and interpretation. The highest ground resolution achieved by the main cameras of the satellite was 2 ft (0.61 m), though another source says "images in the 'better-than-one-foot' category" for the last "Gambit" missions.

They are officially known as the Broad Coverage Photo Reconnaissance satellites (Code 467). The satellites were built by Lockheed Corporation for the NRO.

The satellites were an important factor in determining Soviet military capabilities and in the acquisition of accurate intelligence for the formulation of U.S. national policy decisions as well as deployment of U.S. forces and weapon systems. The satellites were instrumental in U.S. National Technical Means of Verification of Strategic Arms Limitation Talks (SALT) and the Anti-Ballistic Missile Treaty (ABMT).

The KH-9 was declassified in September 2011 and an example was put on public display for a single day on 17 September 2011 in the parking lot of the Steven F. Udvar-Hazy Center of the National Air and Space Museum.

On 26 January 2012, the National Museum of the United States Air Force put a KH-9 on public display along with its predecessors the KH-7 and KH-8.

== Development ==
KH-9 was, according to many who worked on it, the most sophisticated mechanical satellite in history. It was conceived in the early 1960s as a replacement for the CORONA search satellites. The goal was to search large areas of the Earth with a medium resolution camera. The KH-9 carried two main cameras, although a mapping camera was also carried on several missions. The photographic film from the cameras was sent to recoverable re-entry vehicles and returned to Earth, where the capsules were caught in mid-air by an aircraft. Four re-entry vehicles were carried on most missions, with a fifth added for missions that included a mapping camera.

Between September 1966 and July 1967, the contractors for the Hexagon subsystems were selected. Lockheed Missiles and Space Company (LMSC) was awarded the contract for the Satellite Basic Assembly (SBA), Perkin Elmer for the primary Sensor Subsystem (SS), McDonnell for the Reentry Vehicle (RV), RCA Astro-Electronics Division for the Film Take-Up system, and Itek for the Stellar Index camera (SI). Integration and ground-testing of Satellite Vehicle-1 (SV-1) were completed in May 1971, and it was subsequently shipped to Vandenberg Air Force Base in a 70 ft (21 m) container. Ultimately, four generations ("blocks") of KH-9 HEXAGON reconnaissance satellites were developed. KH9-7 (missions 7 to 12) was the first to fly a Block-II panoramic camera and SBA. Block-III (missions 13 to 18) included upgrades to electrical distribution and batteries. Two added tanks with ullage control for the Orbit Adjust System (OAS) and new thrusters for the Reaction Control System (RCS) served to increase KH-9's operational lifetime. In addition, the nitrogen supply for the film transport system and the camera vessel was increased. Block-IV (missions 19 and 20) was equipped with an extended command system using plated-wire memory. In the mid 1970s, over 1,000 people in the Danbury, Connecticut area worked on the secret project.

A reentry vehicle from the first Hexagon satellite sank to 16,000 ft (4,900 m) below the Pacific Ocean after its parachute failed. The USS Trieste II (DSV-1) retrieved its payload in April 1972 after a lengthy search, but the film had disintegrated during the nine months underwater, leaving no usable photographs.

Over the duration of the program, the lifetime of the individual satellites increased steadily. The final KH-9 operated for 275 days. The satellite mass with and without the Mapping Camera System was 13,300 and 11,400 kg (29,300 and 25,100 lb), respectively.

NRO intended to replace HEXAGON with ZEUS, later DAMON—HEXAGON's camera flown on the Space Shuttle—but DAMON was canceled in December 1980. In December 1976 NRO launched the first KH-11 KENNEN. While its electro-optical digital imaging had a smaller field of view than HEXAGON, by not needing film KENNEN was usable for years.

== Main KH-9 components ==
=== Satellite Control Section ===
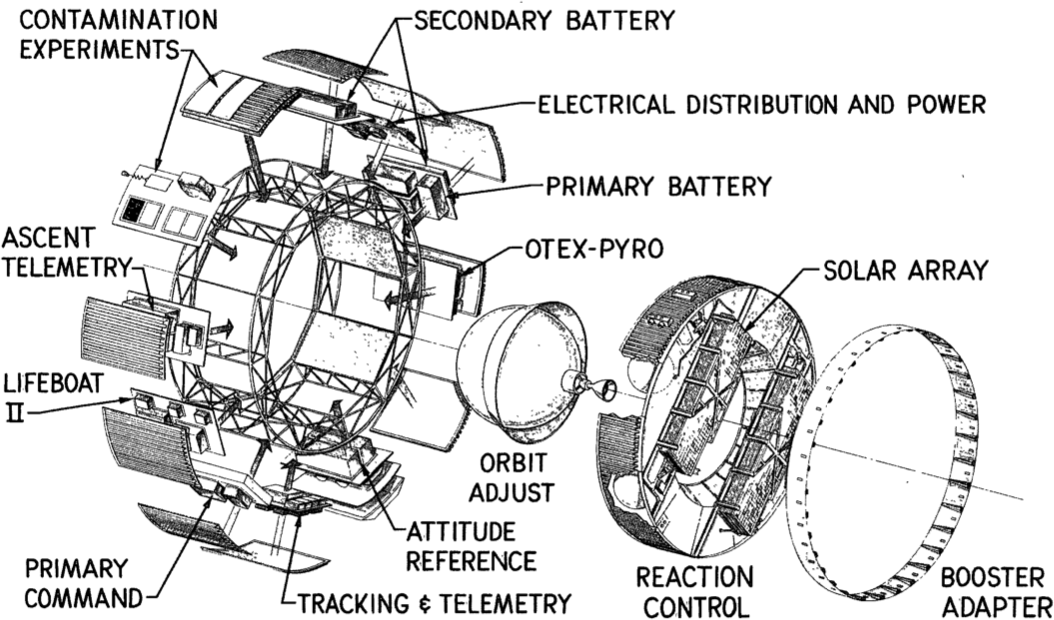
Satellite Control Section

The Satellite Control Section (SCS), which forms the aft part of the SBA, started as Air Force Project 467. SCS was intended as a more capable replacement for the on-orbit propulsion, which had been provided by the Agena upper stage for previous generations of reconnaissance satellites. The SCS featured an increased diameter of 10 ft (3.0 m) (compared to 5 ft (1.5 m) for the Agena) and a length of 6 ft (1.8 m). It housed hydrazine propellant tanks for the pressure fed Orbital Adjust System (OAS) and the Reaction Control System (RCS). OAS and RCS were connected by a transfer line to facilitate propellant exchange. The tank pressure was maintained within the operational range by additional high pressure nitrogen tanks. The SCS incorporated a freon gas system for backup attitude control inherited from the Agena, commonly referred to as "lifeboat". SCS was equipped with deployable solar panels and an unfurlable parabolic antenna for high data rate communication.

=== Main camera ===
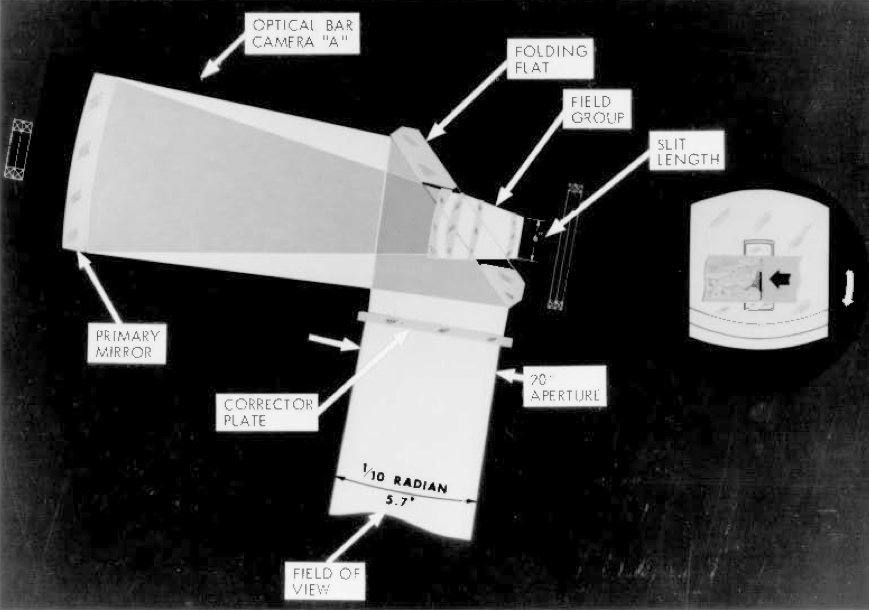
A main camera optical path

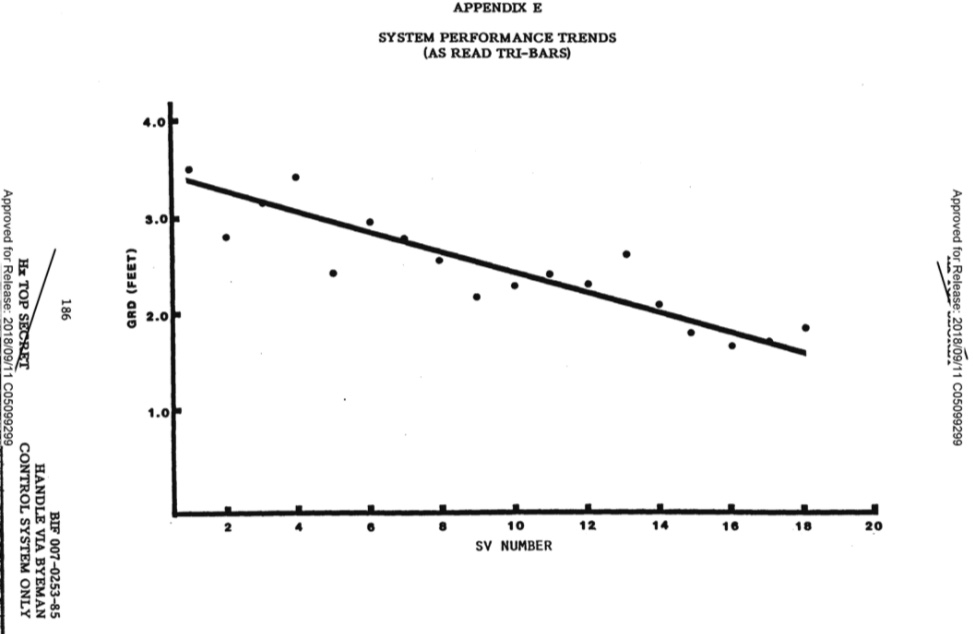
A achieved ground resolution of Satellite Vehicles (SV) 1 to 18 main cameras.

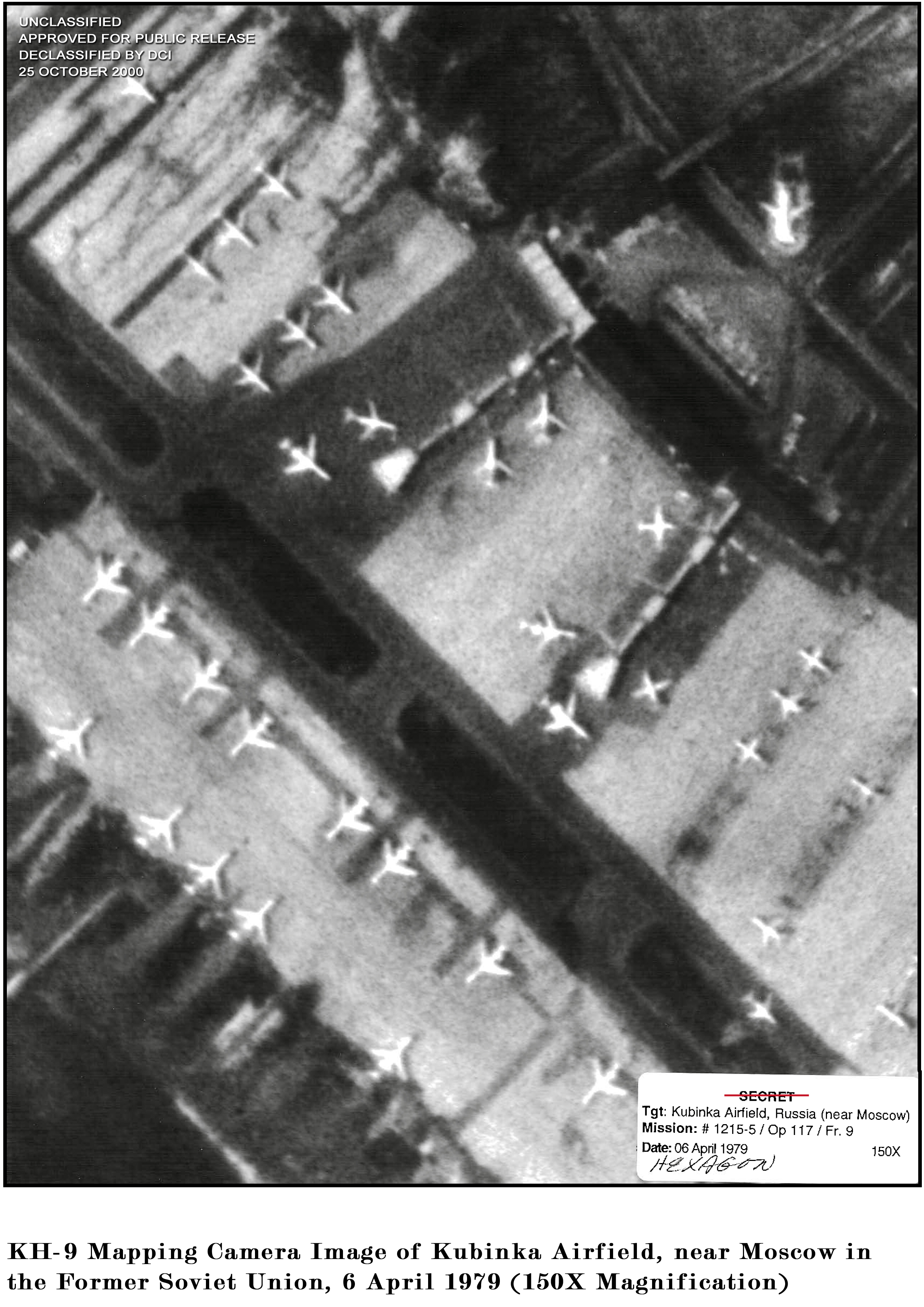
A KH-9 image of the Soviet civil Moscow Domodedovo Airport misidentified in the original document as Kubinka airfield

The main camera system was designed by Perkin-Elmer to take stereo images, with a forward looking camera on the port side, and an aft looking camera on the starboard side. Images were taken at altitudes ranging from 90–200 mi (480,000–1,060,000 ft; 140–320 km). The camera optical layout is an f/3.0 folded Wright camera, with a focal length of 60 in (1,500 mm). The system aperture is defined by a 20 in (510 mm) diameter aspheric corrector plate, which corrects the spherical aberration of the Wright design. In each of the cameras the ground image passes through the corrector plate to a 45°-angle flat mirror, which reflects the light to a 0.91 m (3 ft 0 in)-diameter concave main mirror. The main mirror directs the light through an opening in the flat mirror and through a four-element lens system onto the film platen. The cameras could scan contiguous areas up to 120° wide, and achieved a ground resolution better than 2 ft (0.61 m) during the later phase of the project. Dwayne Allen Day calculated, using disclosed specifications, that HEXAGON was capable of 0.2 m (7.9 in) at nadir, and 0.4 m (1 ft 4 in) at apogee.

=== Mapping camera ===
Missions 1205 to 1216 carried a "mapping camera" (also known as a "frame camera") that used 9 in (230 mm) film and had a moderately low resolution of initially 30 ft (9.1 m), which improved to 20 ft (6.1 m) on later missions (somewhat better than LANDSAT). Intended for mapmaking, photos this camera took cover the entire Earth with images between 1973 and 1981. Almost all the imagery from this camera, amounting to 29,000 images, each covering 3,400 km^{2} (1,300 sq mi), was declassified in 2002 as a result of Executive order 12951, the same order which declassified CORONA, and copies of the films were transferred to the U.S. Geological Survey's Earth Resources Observation Systems office.

Scientific analysis of declassified KH-9 satellite images continues to reveal historic trends and changes in climate and terrestrial geology. A 2019 study of glacial melt in the Himalayas over the past half-century used data collected by KH-9 satellites throughout the 1970s and 1980s to demonstrate that melt rates had doubled since 1975.

The KH-9 was never a backup project for the KH-10 Manned Orbital Laboratory. It was developed solely as a replacement for the Corona search system.

=== Reentry vehicles ===
The forward section of KH-9 housed four McDonnell Douglas Mark 8 satellite reentry vehicles (RV), which were fed film exposed by the main cameras. Each RV had an empty mass of 434 kg. It housed a film take-up assembly (built by RCA Astro Electronic Division) with a mass of 108 kg, and could store about 227 kg of film. The twelve mapping missions were equipped with an additional General Electrics Mark V RV, which could store about 32 kg of film for a total mass of 177 kg.

=== High-altitude atmospheric density ===
Missions 1205 to 1207 carried Doppler beacons to help map the atmospheric density at high altitudes in an effort to understand the effect on ephemeris predictions. The measurements of the atmospheric density were released through NASA.

=== ELINT subsatellites ===
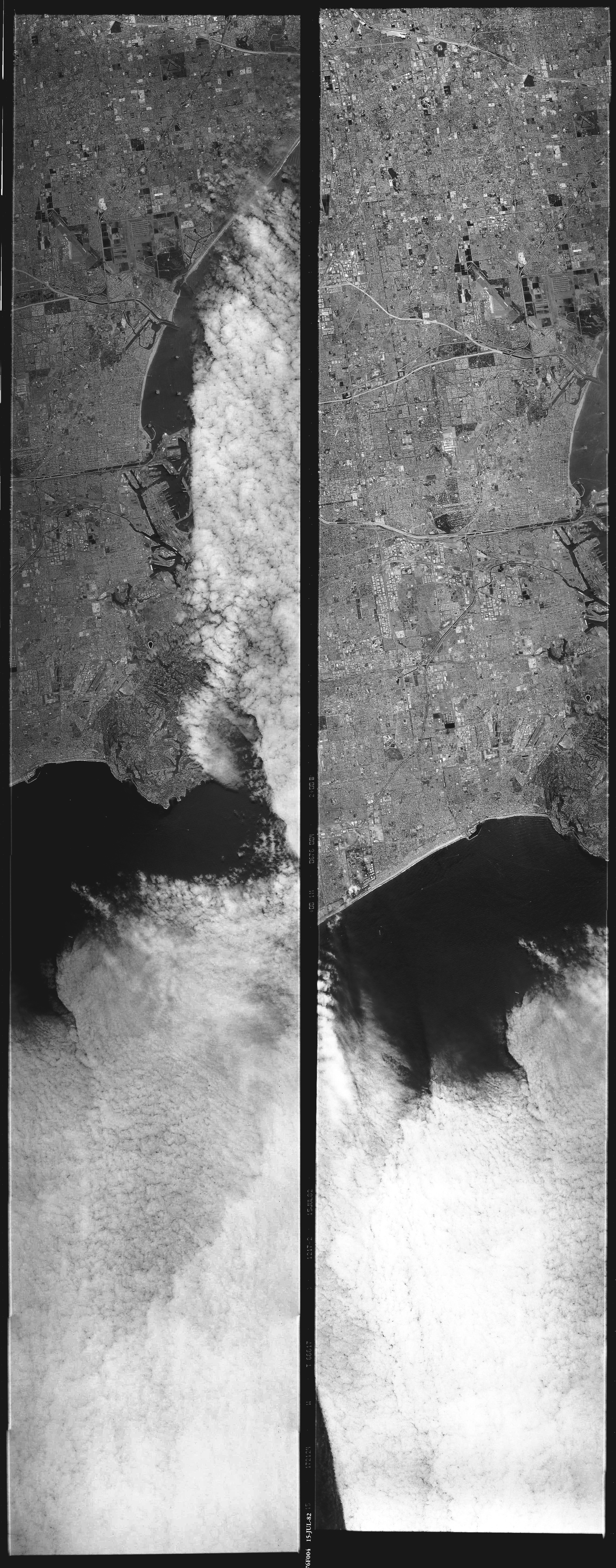
Stereo pair of KH-9 imagery (Los Angeles-1968/06)

Missions 1203, 1207, 1208, 1209, and 1212 to 1219 included Ferret ELINT sub-satellites, which were launched into a high Earth orbit to catalogue Soviet air defence radars, eavesdrop on voice communications, and tape missile and satellite telemetry. Missions 1210 to 1212 also included scientific subsatellites.

=== IRCB (S73-7) ===
IRCB (Infra-Red Calibration Balloon) was an 66 cm diameter inflatable calibration sphere orbited in the Space Test Program. It was a piggy-back payload on KH9-8 (1208) boosting it to a 500 mile (800 kilometers) circular orbit. It disappeared from ground-based sensors in the 1990s, and was found again in 2024.

== KH-9 missions ==
Name	Block	Mission no.	Launch date	NSSDC ID NORAD #	Other Name	Launch vehicle	Orbit	Decay date
KH9-1	I	1201	15 June 1971	1971-056A; 05297	OPS 7809	Titan IIID	184.0 km × 300.0 km, i=96.4°	6 August 1971
KH9-2	I	1202	20 January 1972	1972-002A; 05769	OPS 1737	Titan IIID	157.0 km × 331.0 km, i=97.0°	29 February 1972
KH9-3	I	1203	7 July 1972	1972-052A; 06094	OPS 7293	Titan IIID	174.0 km × 251.0 km, i=96.9°	13 September 1972
KH9-4	I	1204	10 October 1972	1972-079A; 06227	OPS 8314	Titan IIID	160.0 km × 281.0 km, i=96.5°	8 January 1973
KH9-5	I	1205	9 March 1973	1973-014A; 06382	OPS 8410	Titan IIID	152.0 km × 270.0 km, i=95.7°	19 May 1973
KH9-6	I	1206	13 July 1973	1973-046A; 06727	OPS 8261	Titan IIID	156.0 km × 269.0 km, i=96.2°	12 October 1973
KH9-7	II	1207	10 November 1973	1973-088A; 06928	OPS 6630	Titan IIID	159.0 km × 275.0 km, i=96.9°	13 March 1974
KH9-8	II	1208	10 April 1974	1974-020A; 07242	OPS 6245	Titan IIID	153.0 km × 285.0 km, i=94.5°	28 July 1974
KH9-9	II	1209	29 October 1974	1974-085A; 07495	OPS 7122	Titan IIID	162.0 km × 271.0 km, i=96.7°	19 March 1975
KH9-10	II	1210	8 June 1975	1975-051A; 07918	OPS 6381	Titan IIID	157.0 km × 234.0 km, i=96.3°	5 November 1975
KH9-11	II	1211	4 December 1975	1975-114A; 08467	OPS 4428	Titan IIID	157.0 km × 234.0 km, i=96.7°	1 April 1976
KH9-12	II	1212	8 July 1976	1976-065A; 09006	OPS 4699	Titan IIID	159.0 km × 242.0 km, i=97.0°	13 December 1976
KH9-13	III	1213	27 June 1977	1977-056A; 10111	OPS 4800	Titan IIID	155.0 km × 239.0 km, i=97.0°	23 December 1977
KH9-14	III	1214	16 March 1978	1978-029A; 10733	OPS 0460	Titan IIID	172.0 km × 218.0 km, i=96.4°	11 September 1978
KH9-15	III	1215	16 March 1979	1979-025A; 11305	OPS 3854	Titan IIID	177.0 km × 256.0 km, i=96.3°	22 September 1979
KH9-16	III	1216	18 June 1980	1980-052A; 11850	OPS 3123	Titan IIID	169.0 km × 265.0 km, i=96.5°	6 March 1981
KH9-17	III	1217	11 May 1982	1982-041A; 13170	OPS 5642	Titan IIID	177.0 km × 262.0 km, i=96.4°	5 December 1982
KH9-18	III	1218	20 June 1983	1983-060A; 14137	OPS 0721	Titan 34D	163.0 km × 224.0 km, i=96.4°	21 March 1984
KH9-19	IV	1219	25 June 1984	1984-065A; 15063	USA 2	Titan 34D	170.0 km × 230.0 km, i=96.5°	18 October 1984
KH9-20	IV	1220	18 April 1986	1986-F03	Launch failed	Titan 34D	—	—

(NSSDC ID Numbers: See COSPAR)

== Cost ==
The total cost of the 20 flights KH-9 program from FY1966 to FY1986 was US$3.262 billion in respective year dollars (equivalent to 18.46 billion in 2025, with an average reference year of 1976).

== Specifications ==
Data source: The Encyclopedia of US Spacecraft and NSSDC

- Launch vehicle: Titan IIID/34D
- Total weight: 11,400 kg (25,100 lb), with mapping camera 13,300 kg (29,300 lb)
- Reentry weight: 5,330 kg (11,750 lb)
- Max. diameter (main body): 3.05 m (10.0 ft)
- Length (with mapping camera): 16.21 m (53.2 ft)
- Orbit: elliptical, 160 km × 240 km (99 mi × 149 mi)
- Scanners: television, radio, and high resolution camera

== Declassification ==
The HEXAGON images have been declassified in 2011 as a continuation of Executive Order 12951. The declassified imagery has since been used to conduct Earth observation (EO) by numerous scholars, offering insight into past cultures and climate research. The imagery has been utilized by a team of scientists from Dartmouth College to detect Roman forts in Syria, the Catalan Institute of Classical Archaeology (ICAC) to detect qanat irrigation systems, a team of scientists from Newcastle University to detect desertification and record qanat systems in Skoura Oasis, Morocco and to record qanat systems in Kharga Oasis, Egypt, and a multidisciplinary team of scientists from Italy's Institute of Atmospheric Sciences and Climate (ISAC), Natural Research Council (CNR), Newcastle University, The University of Al-Qadisiyah, and the Italian Space Agency (ASI) to map archaeological sites and ancient irrigation systems and study the climate-water-agriculture-heritage nexus in Southern Iraq.

== Gallery ==
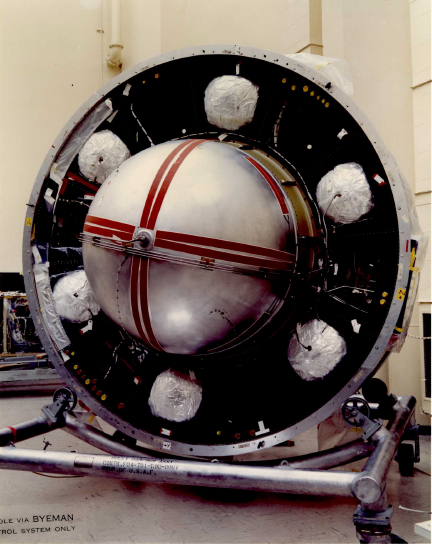
The reaction control system of a KH-9, showing the propellant tanks.

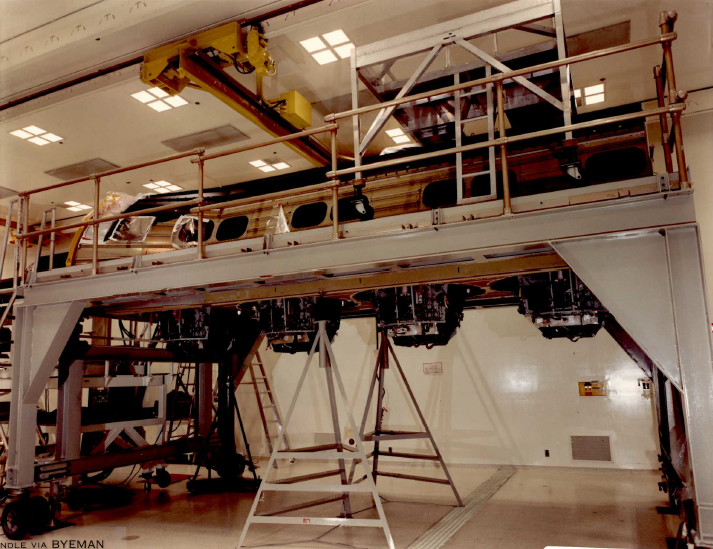
A KH-9 in scaffolding, being prepared for launch.

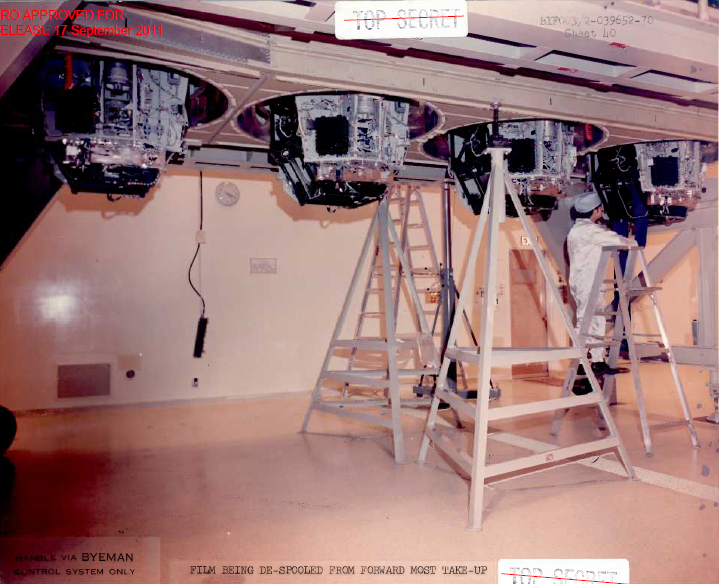
A technician despools one of the re-entry modules which contained the film used by the cameras.

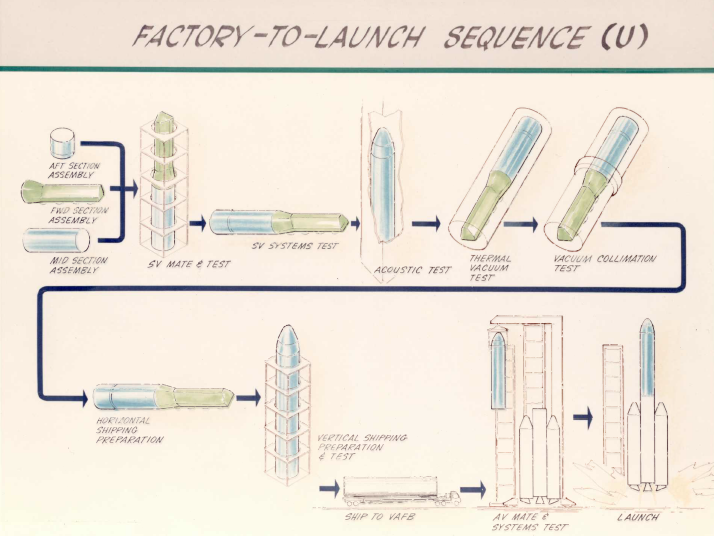
A diagram showing the assembly, testing and launch preparations of a KH-9.

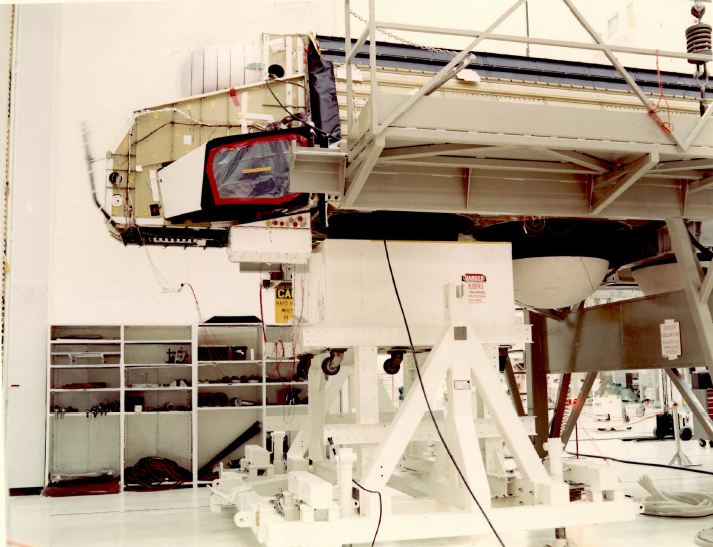
The forward section of a KH-9.

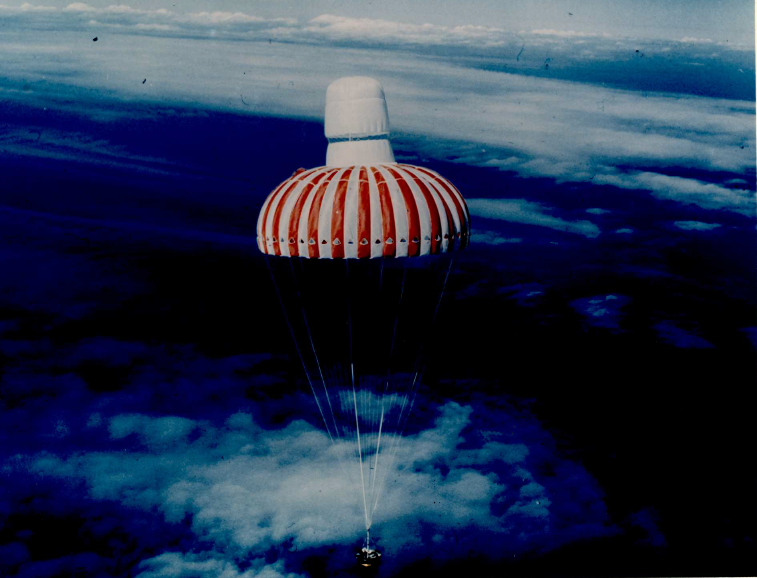
A KH-9 re-entry module hanging from its parachute, ready to be retrieved.

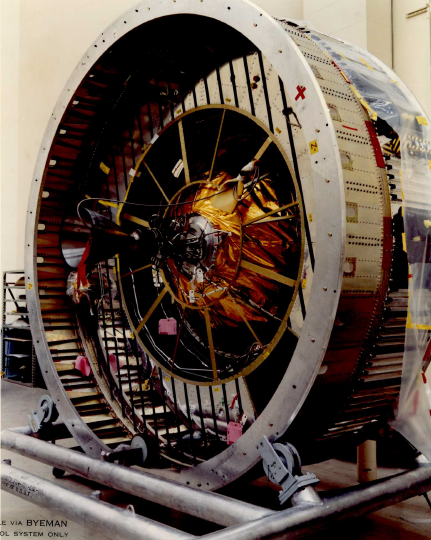
Another view of the KH-9's reaction control system.

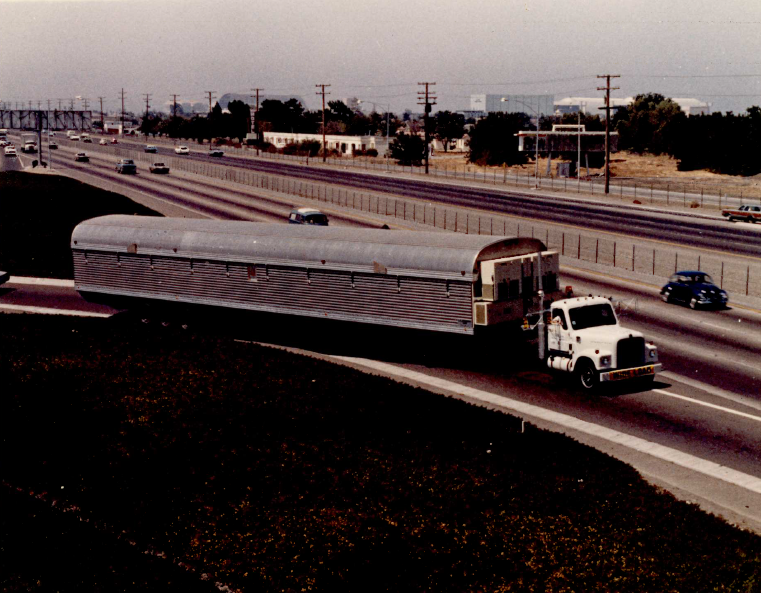
A KH-9 being transported by truck in a special canister.

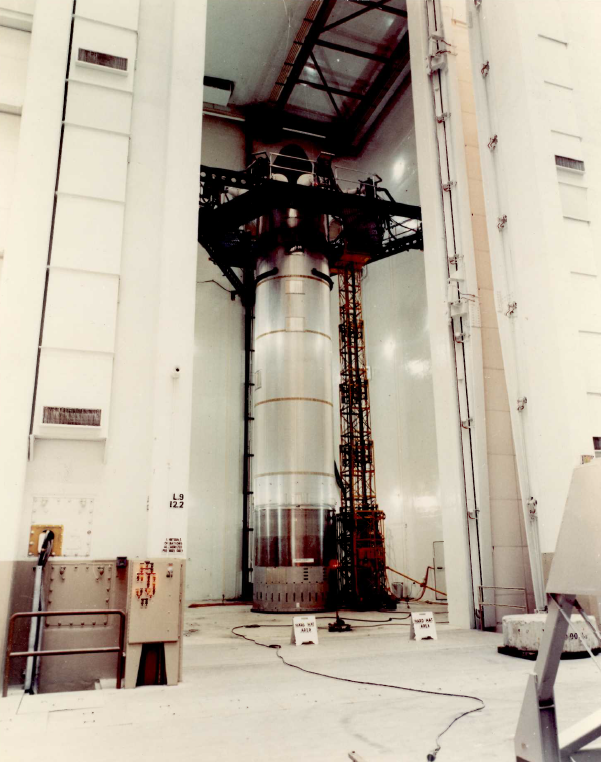
The shroud and base of a KH-9 undergo vibration tests in an acoustic chamber.

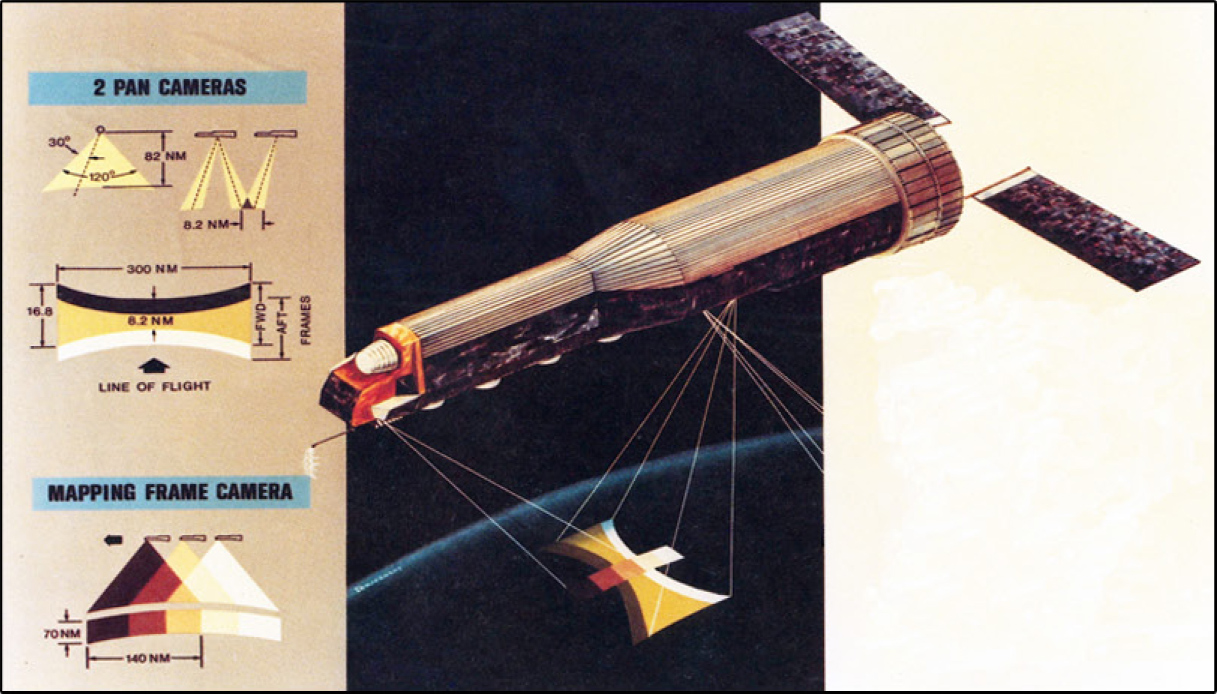
This painting of a KH-9 shows the two different camera types that the satellite carried.

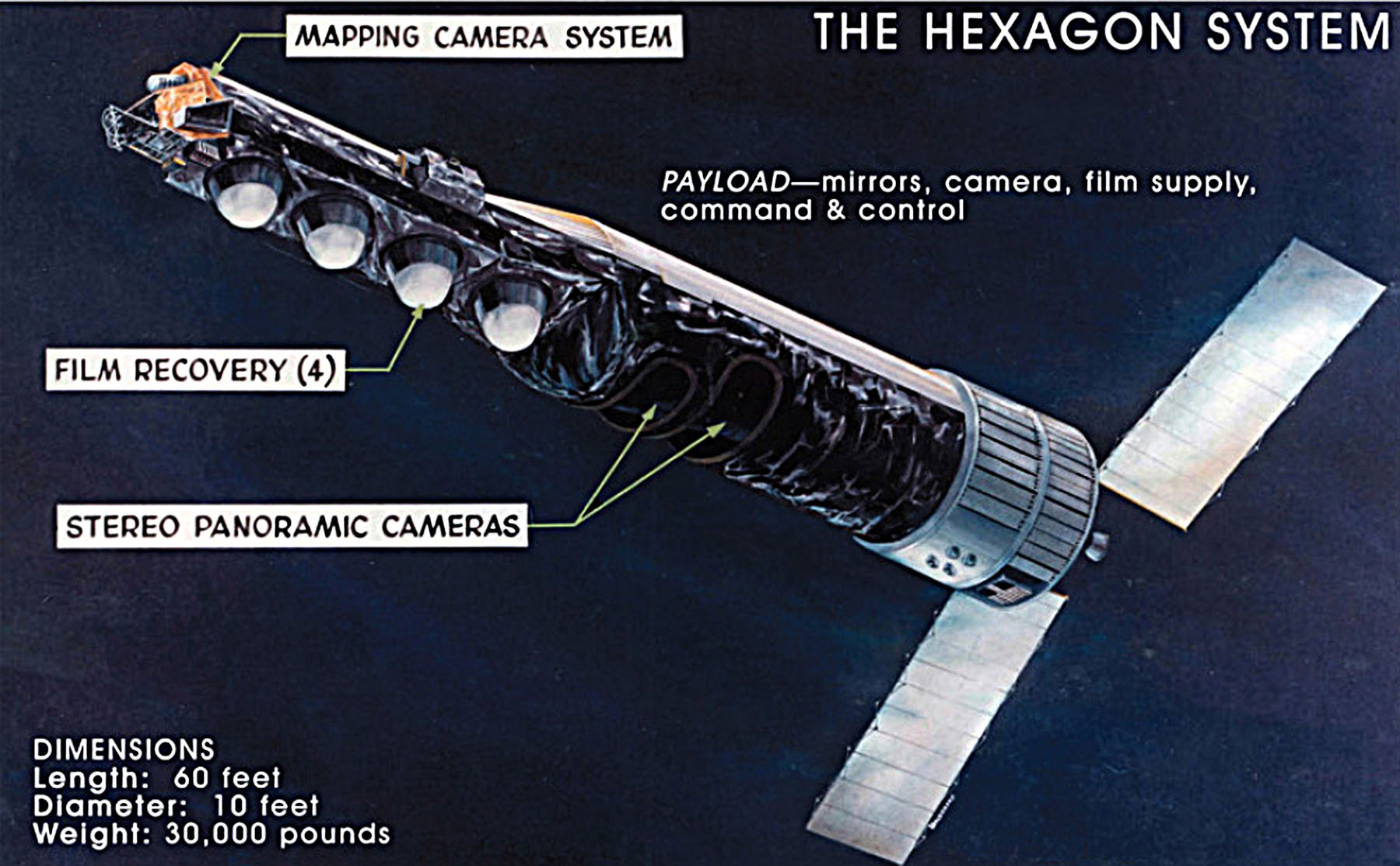
Basic specifications and diagram of the KH-9.

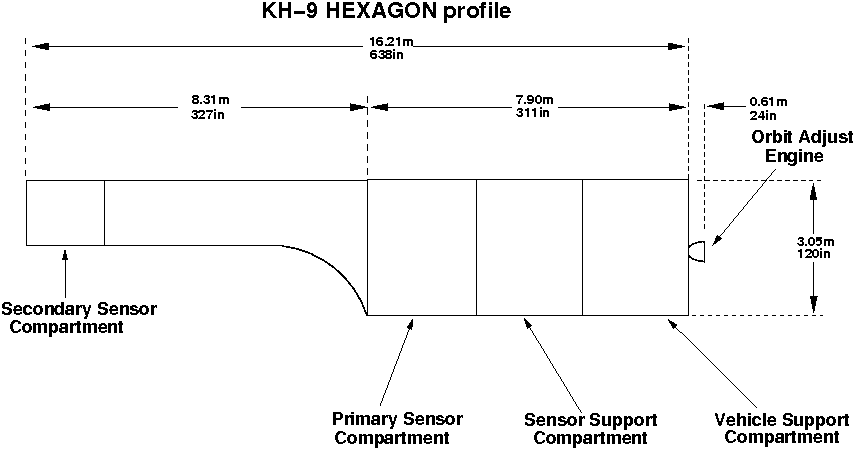
This diagram shows the various sections of the KH-9 and their dimensions.

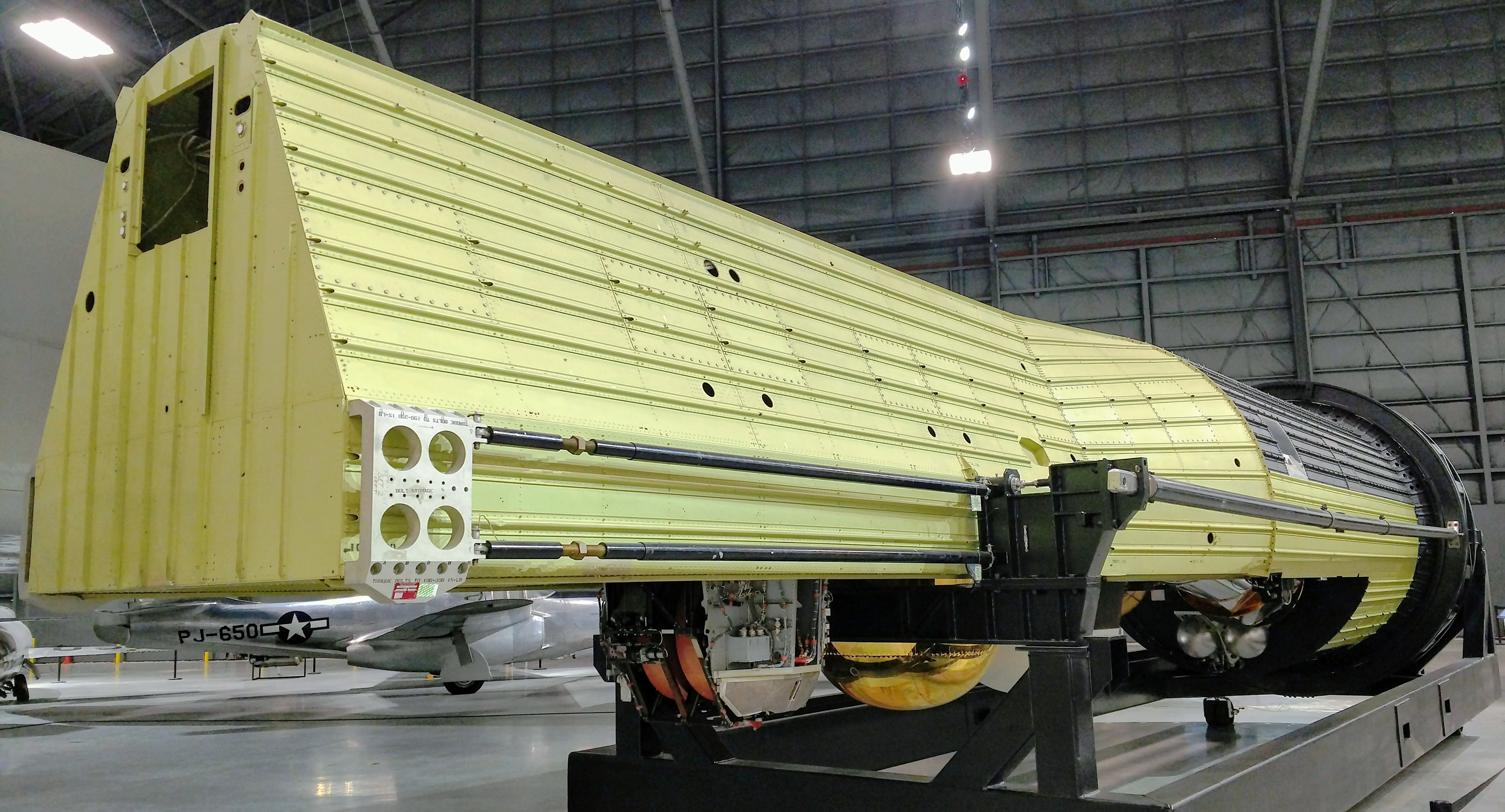
A KH-9 at the National Museum of the United States Air Force (front view).

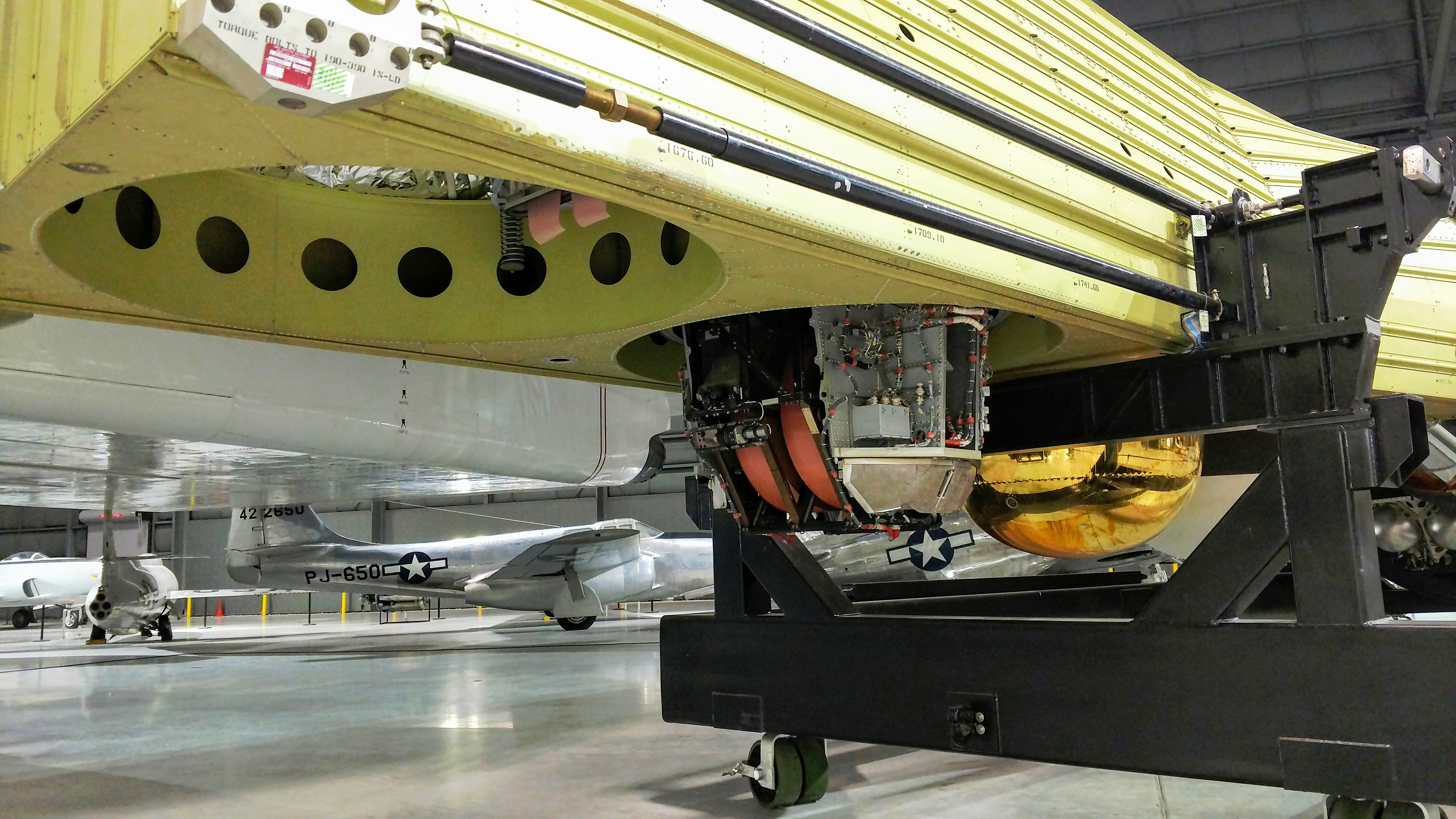
A KH-9 at the National Museum of the United States Air Force (forward section).

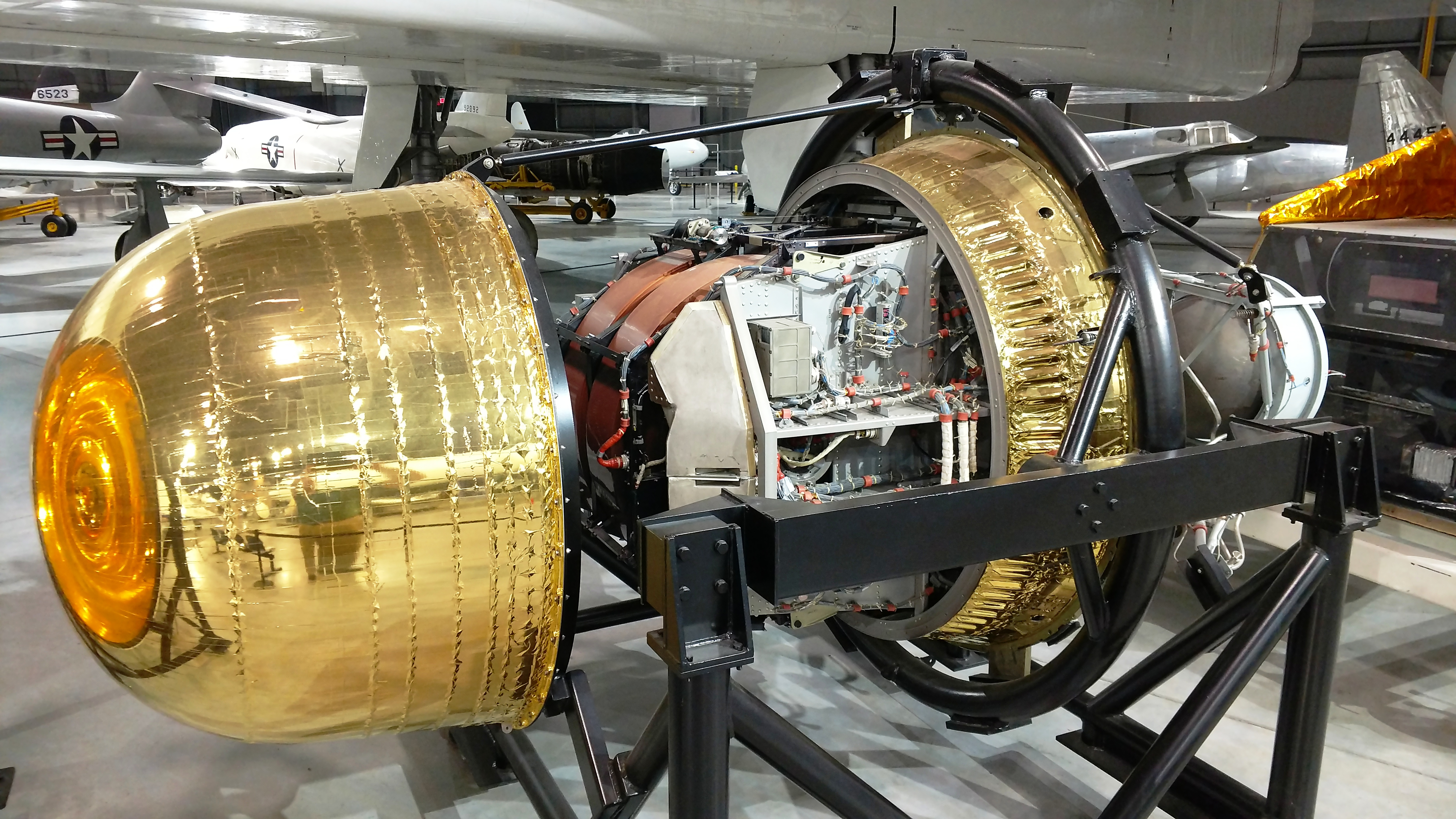
A KH-9 at the National Museum of the United States Air Force (film recovery unit).

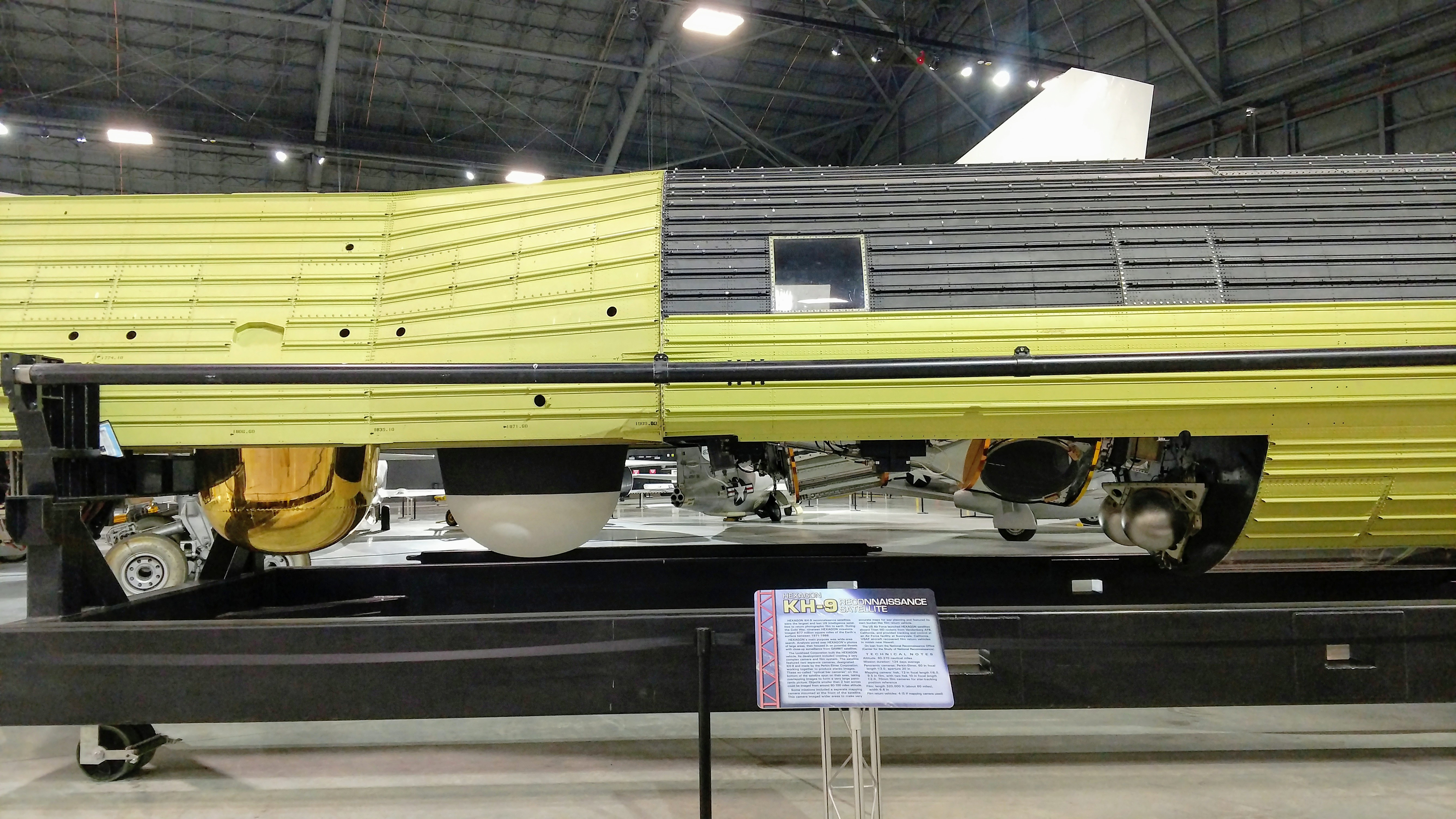
A KH-9 at the National Museum of the United States Air Force (center section).

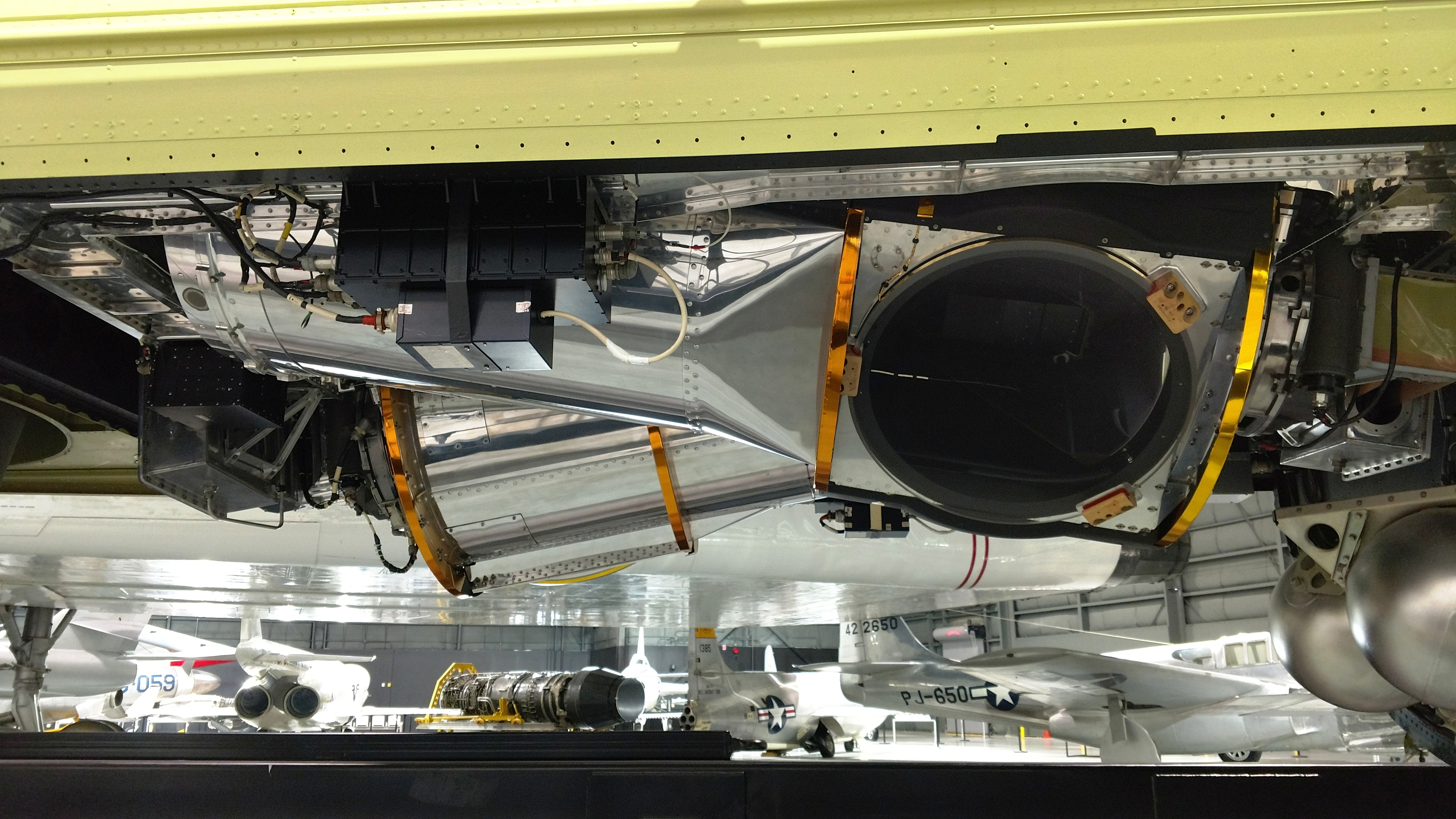
A KH-9 at the National Museum of the United States Air Force (left camera).

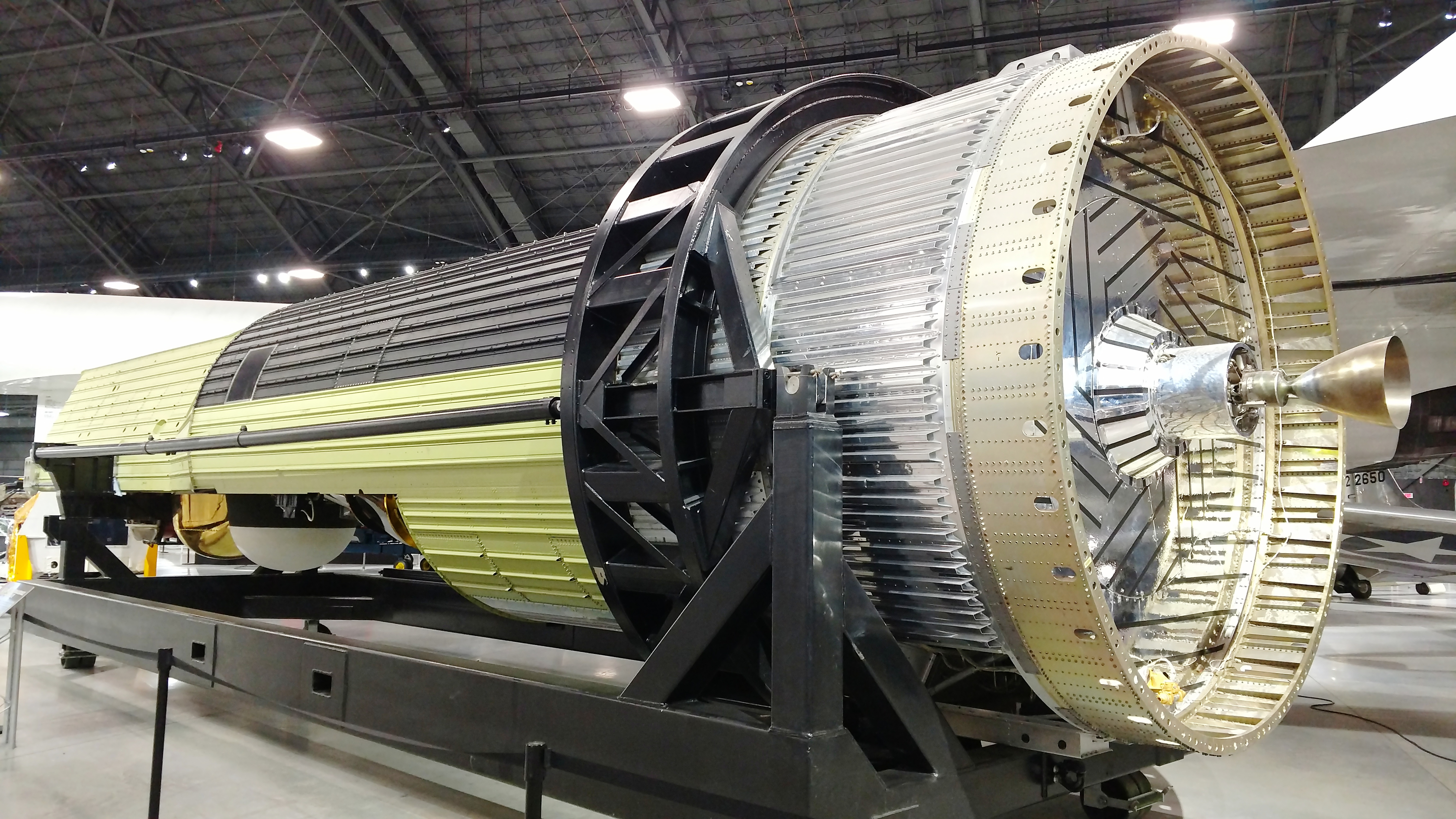
A KH-9 at the National Museum of the United States Air Force (rear view without solar panels).

== See also ==
Other U.S. imaging spy satellites:

- CORONA series:
  - KH-1
  - KH-2
  - KH-3
  - KH-4
- KH-5 Argon
- KH-6 Lanyard
- KH-7 Gambit
- KH-8 Gambit 3
- KH-10 (Manned Orbiting Laboratory)
- KH-11 Kennen
- KH-13 (Enhanced Imaging System)
