= Byeman Control System =

Security control system

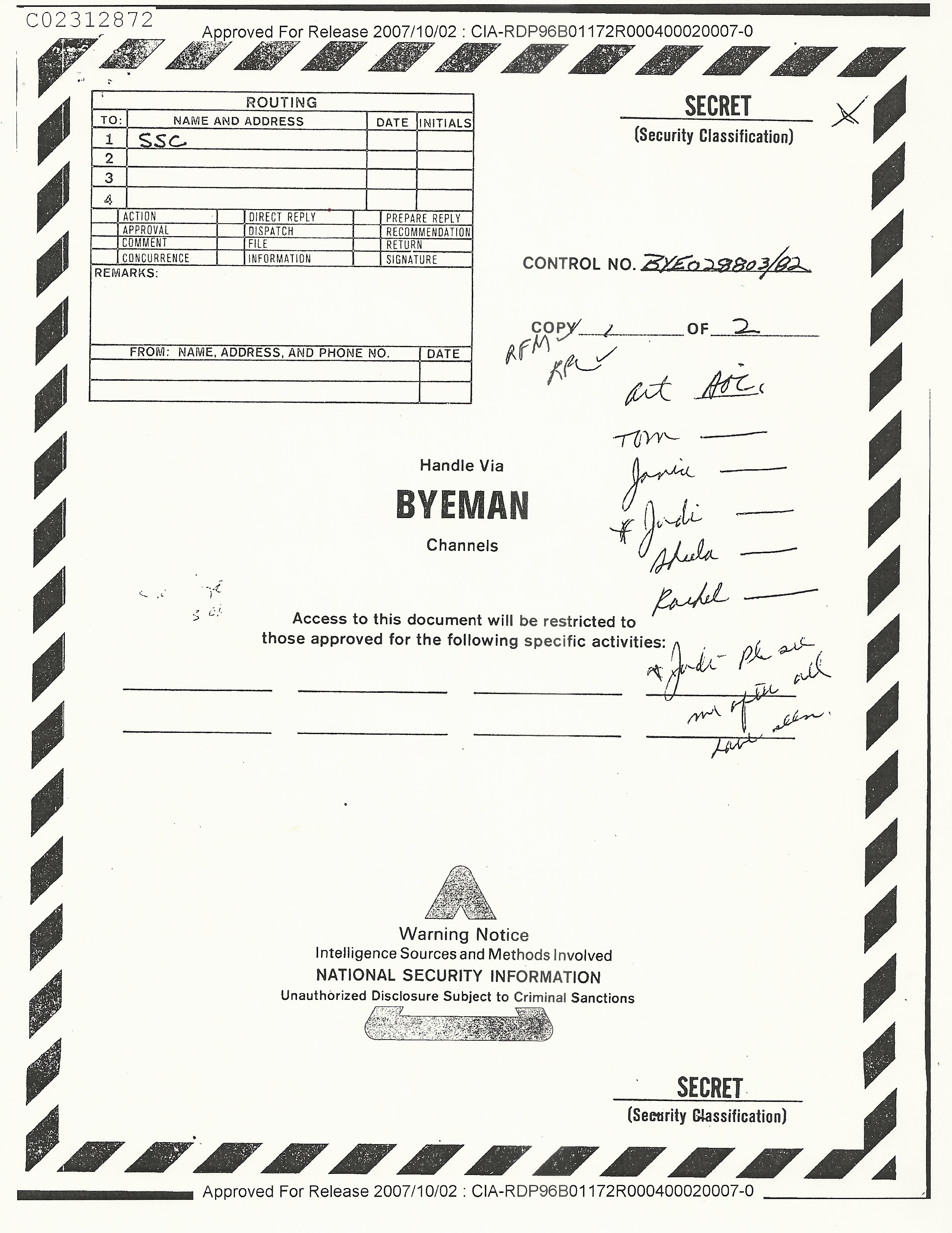
BYEMAN coversheet

The BYEMAN Control System, or simply BYEMAN (designated BYE, or B), was a security control system put in place to protect information about the National Reconnaissance Office and its operations.

== History ==
The BYEMAN Control System (BCS) was put in place in 1961 by the Central Intelligence Agency.

It was revealed that Ana Montes, a former senior analyst at the Defense Intelligence Agency who spied for Cuba, had been granted access to the classified BYEMAN system, which provided her access to satellite data. Although she had never actually viewed any intelligence within the system, Montes later admitted during a post-arrest debriefing that she had informed the Cubans of the system’s existence.

Discussions regarding BCS retirement were held as early as 2003. NRO Director Peter B. Teets spoke at a 2003 NRO Town Hall meeting, mentioning that retiring the BCS would remove barriers that prevented the NRO and U.S. Intelligence Community from working together as a team.

The use of BCS was so prevalent throughout the U.S. Intelligence Community, that a handful of websites were set up to direct users through the retirement process.

== Origin of name ==
An individual inside the CIA's Special Security Center chose the name from a random list of four words drawn from the CIA's codeword file. A byeman is a man who works underground; it is unknown if the individual knew the word's meaning before its selection.

== Programs within BYEMAN ==
This is a small list of the publicly acknowledged programs that were held within the BCS:

- CORONA (declassified 1995)
- ARGON (declassified 1995)
- LANYARD (declassified 1995)
- GAMBIT (declassified 2011)
- HEXAGON (declassified 2011)
- GRAB (declassified 1998)
- POPPY (declassified 2004)
- QUILL (declassified 2012)
- DORIAN (partial declassification 2012)
- MELVIN (declassified 2011)
- UPWARD - assistance given by the National Reconnaissance Office to NASA during the Apollo program. Declassified 2012
- IDEALIST - Lockheed U-2 reconnaissance aircraft program. Declassified 2025.
- OXCART (declassified 2025)(Lockheed A-12 reconnaissance aircraft)

While many other NRO programs resided within the BCS, their codenames have not been made public through proper disclosure or official declassification.

== Retirement ==
By order of the Director of Central Intelligence (DCI), BYEMAN was retired on 20 May 2005. Most information held within the BCS was transitioned into the Talent Keyhole Control System.

== In popular culture ==
In the 1998 blockbuster movie Armageddon, a misspelling of the word, (i.e. "BYMAN") is used on a cover sheet protecting photos of the incoming asteroid. (the correct spelling, BYEMAN, was still classified "Confidential" at that time.) In the 1985 spy movie “The Falcon and the Snowman”, the main character played by Timothy Hutton is entering a top secret spy satellite support facility for the first time when he passes a sign stating that it is “RESTRICTED ENTRY - BYEMAN CLEARANCE REQUIRED”
