= Upward (military project) =

Possible aid to NASA during Project Apollo

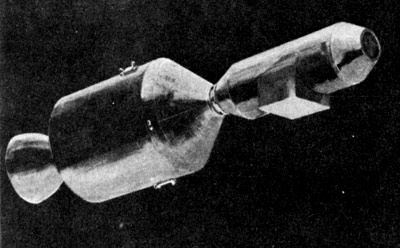
Artist's conception of Upward.

UPWARD was the code name, within the National Reconnaissance Office's Byeman Control System, for assistance given to the National Aeronautics and Space Administration (NASA) during the Apollo program. The camera designed to survey the lunar surface was a modification of the GAMBIT design and utilized a 1.5-inch (38 mm) focal length camera for a terrain mapping apparatus. This camera system was present on both the CORONA and GAMBIT survey systems.

== History ==
The NRO and NASA had multiple meetings discussing the required technology for Lunar Mapping. Specifically, the NASA Apollo Applicant Working Group (dated on 6–9 December 1966) considered the following optical sensors:

- A camera from the uncrewed lunar orbiter
- 12-inch (300 mm) focal length panoramic camera
- The multi-spectral experiment reviewed earlier by the Department of Defense
- 6-inch (150 mm) focal length mapping camera
- Telescope using Questar lens (56-inch (1,400 mm) focal length) and with simplified tracking and focusing device
- An imaging radar

In a following meeting on 31 January 1967, NASA stated at the DoD-NASA Survey Applications Coordinating Committee that "there are no sensors other than Lunar Mapping and Survey System (LM&SS) for flight on AAP-1 [the first Apollo Applications Program mission]."

According to the NRO/NASA agreement, lunar photography could be sanitized by eliminating camera scale factors. The project had the unclassified name of Lunar Mapping and Survey System (LM&SS) in NASA channels.

The success of both Lunar Orbiter and Surveyor negated the use of the LM&SS system. There are no recorded spaceflights with these systems. NASA terminated all activity associated with hardware and software procurement, development, and testing for LM&SS on August 2, 1967.

== See also ==
- Lunar Orbiter - used recycled technology from SAMOS (satellite)
- KH-11
- KH-10
