= KH-6 Lanyard =

Series of unsuccessful reconnaissance satellites by the United States

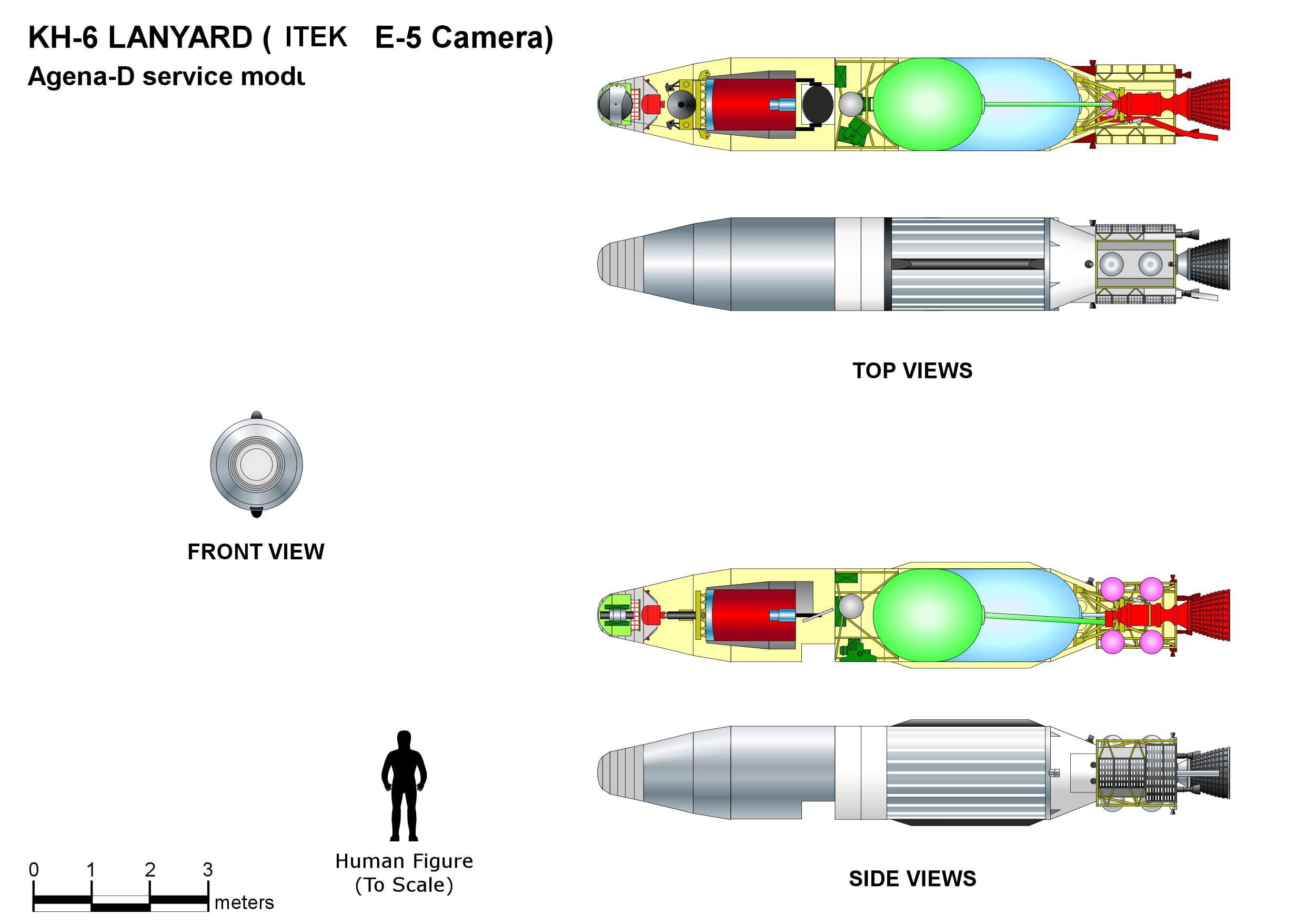
A KH-6 LANYARD main features

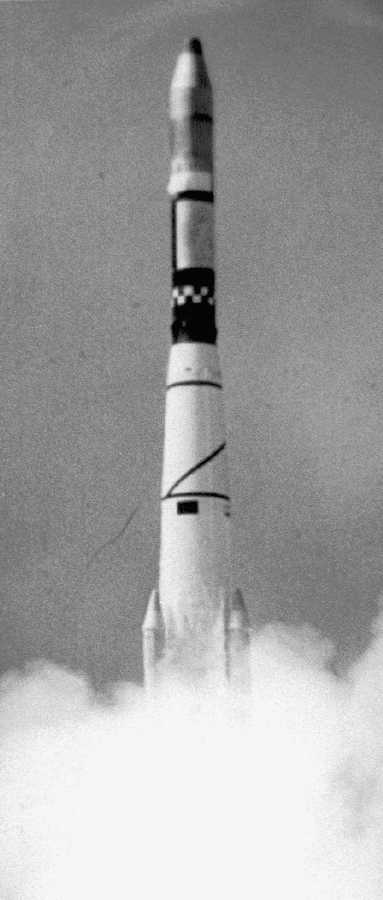
Thor SLV-2A Agena D (Thor 360) with KH-6 8001 on 18 March 1963

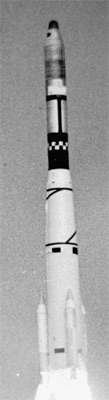
Thor-SLV2A Agena-D (Thor 364) with KH-6 2 on 18 May 1963

BYEMAN codenamed LANYARD, the KH-6 was the unsuccessful first attempt to develop and deploy a very high-resolution optical reconnaissance satellite by the United States National Reconnaissance Office. Launches and launch attempts spanned the period from March to July 1963. The project was quickly put together to get imagery of a site near Leningrad suspected of having anti-ballistic missiles.

The satellite carried Itek's "E-5" camera developed for the SAMOS program, which had been cancelled. The camera had a focal length of 1.67 m (5 ft 6 in) and could discern objects on the ground 1.8 m (5 ft 11 in) in size. The ground swath of the camera was 14 km × 74 km (8.7 mi × 46.0 mi). The satellite weighed 1,500 kg (3,300 lb), and had a single re-entry vehicle in which exposed film was returned to earth for a mid-air aircraft recovery.

The KH-6 was manufactured by Lockheed Martin and launched from Vandenberg Air Force Base on Thor-Agena D launch vehicles.

== Launches ==
KH-6 8001 was launched from Vandenberg AFB aboard a Thor-Agena D launch vehicle (Thor 360) at 00:00:00 GMT on 18 March 1963. It was the first of three KH-6 LANYARD launches. This mission was a failure because the Agena guidance system failed.

KH-6 8002 was launched from Vandenberg AFB aboard a Thor-Agena D rocket (Thor 364) at 22:34:00 GMT on 18 May 1963. This was the second launch KH-6 LANYARD satellite. This spacecraft achieved orbit but the Agena rocket failed in flight and no film data were returned.

KH-6 8003 was launched from Vandenberg AFB aboard a Thor-Agena D rocket (Thor 382) at 00:00:00 GMT on 31 July 1963. This was the third and final KH-6 (LANYARD) mission that was designed to provide very high-resolution photos (61 cm), but the best resolution achieved was 183 cm, the same as KH-4B, so LANYARD was discontinued after this 3rd flight in 1963. The camera failed after 32 hours. The mission was deemed a success but the image quality was poor. The film canister contained over 2,250 feet of film with 910 photographic frames.

== See also ==
- CORONA KH-1 through 4 (concurrent operations)
- KH-5 ARGON
- KH-7 GAMBIT
- KH-8 GAMBIT-3 (concurrent operations)
- KH-9 HEXAGON or "Big Bird"
- KH-10 DORIAN or Manned Orbital Laboratory
- KH-11 KENNEN, KH-12, KH-13.
- Satellite imagery
- Cold War
