= Geodesic map =

In mathematics—specifically, in differential geometry—a geodesic map (or geodesic mapping or geodesic diffeomorphism) is a function that "preserves geodesics". More precisely, given two (pseudo-)Riemannian manifolds (M, g) and (N, h), a function φ : M → N is said to be a geodesic map if

- φ is a diffeomorphism of M onto N; and
- the image under φ of any geodesic arc in M is a geodesic arc in N; and
- the image under the inverse function φ^{−1} of any geodesic arc in N is a geodesic arc in M.

== Examples ==
- If (M, g) and (N, h) are both the n-dimensional Euclidean space E^{n} with its usual flat metric, then any Euclidean isometry is a geodesic map of E^{n} onto itself.
- Similarly, if (M, g) and (N, h) are both the n-dimensional unit sphere S^{n} with its usual round metric, then any isometry of the sphere is a geodesic map of S^{n} onto itself.
- If (M, g) is the unit sphere S^{n} with its usual round metric and (N, h) is the sphere of radius 2 with its usual round metric, both thought of as subsets of the ambient coordinate space R^{n+1}, then the "expansion" map φ : R^{n+1} → R^{n+1} given by φ(x) = 2x induces a geodesic map of M onto N.
- There is no geodesic map from the Euclidean space E^{n} onto the unit sphere S^{n}, since they are not homeomorphic, let alone diffeomorphic.
- The gnomonic projection of the hemisphere to the plane is a geodesic map as it takes great circles to lines and its inverse takes lines to great circles.
- Let (D, g) be the unit disc D ⊂ R^{2} equipped with the Euclidean metric, and let (D, h) be the same disc equipped with a hyperbolic metric as in the Poincaré disc model of hyperbolic geometry. Then, although the two structures are diffeomorphic via the identity map i : D → D, i is not a geodesic map, since g-geodesics are always straight lines in R^{2}, whereas h-geodesics can be curved.
- On the other hand, when the hyperbolic metric on D is given by the Klein model, the identity i : D → D is a geodesic map, because hyperbolic geodesics in the Klein model are (Euclidean) straight line segments.
