= KH-5 Argon =

Series of reconnaissance satellites produced by the United States

- Manufacturer: Lockheed Corporation
- Country of origin: United States
- Operator: NRO
- Applications: Reconnaissance; Geodetic mapping

Specifications
- Bus: RM-81 Agena
- Launch mass: 1,274 kg (2,809 lb)
- Equipment: Optical cameras 556 x 556 km coverage 140 m resolution
- Regime: LEO

Production
- Status: Retired
- Launched: 12
- Retired: 5
- Failed: 4
- Lost: 3

Related spacecraft
- Derived from: CORONA

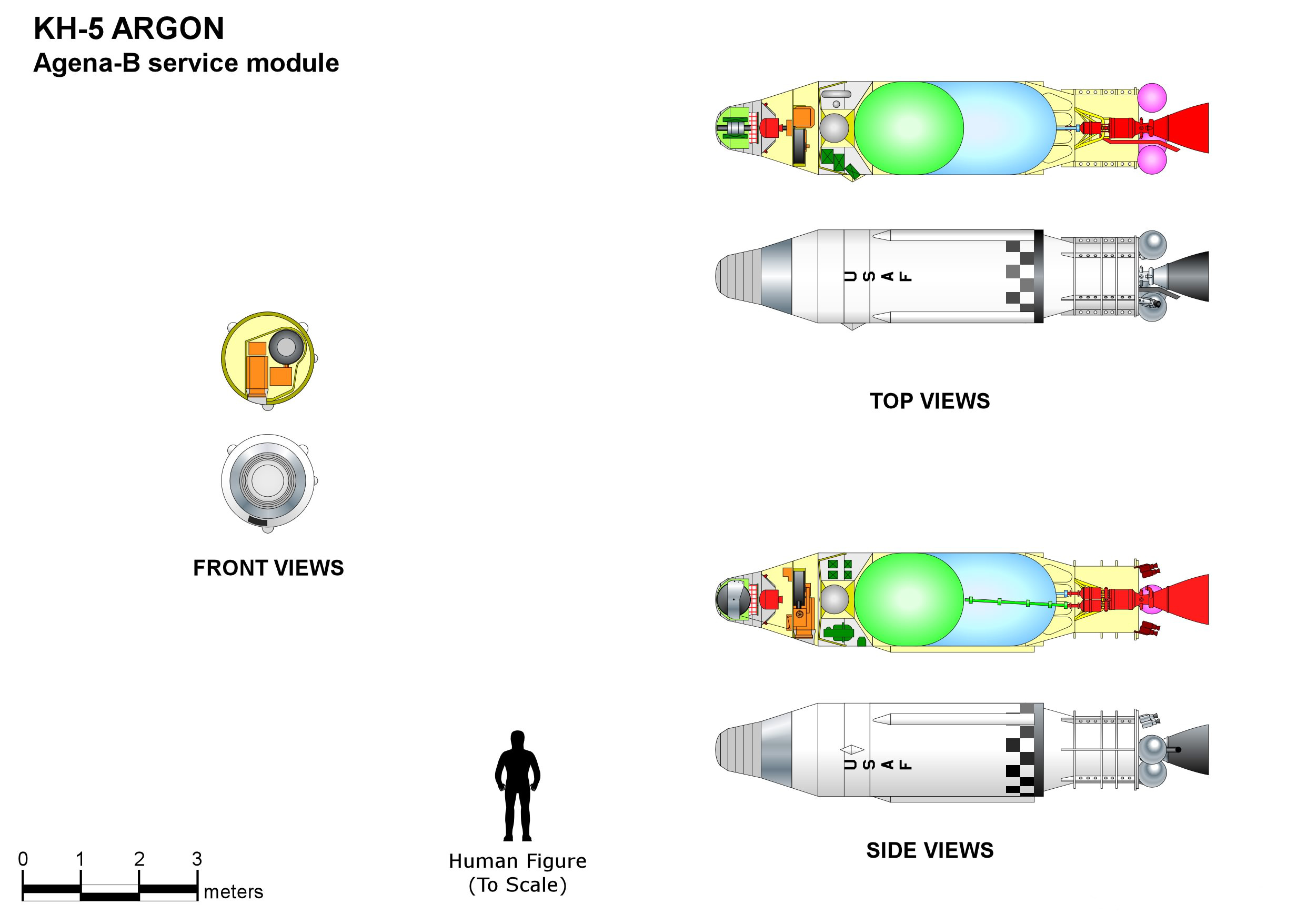
A KH 5 ARGON (with Agena-B service module) main features.

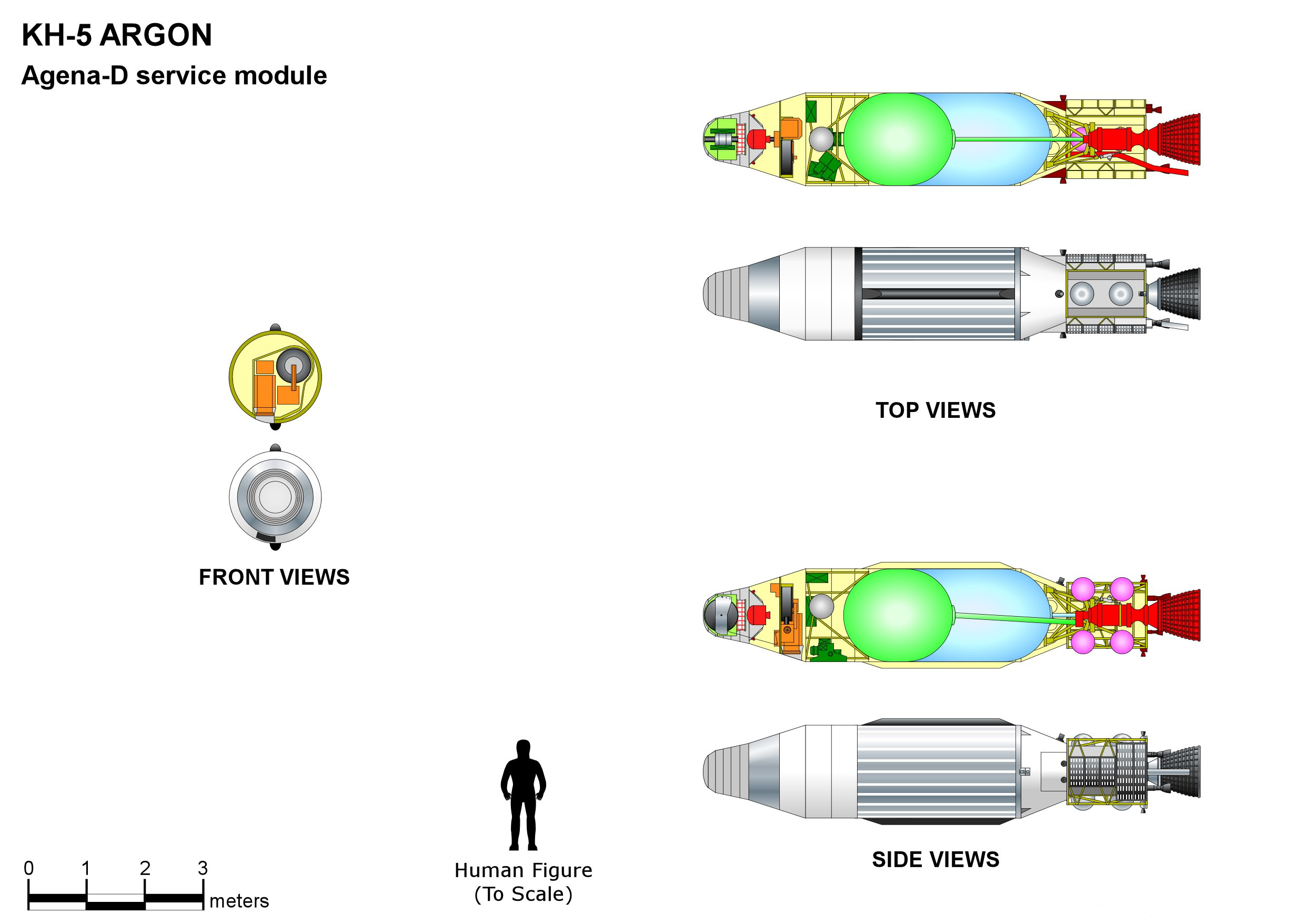
A KH 5 ARGON (with Agena-D service module) main features.

KH-5 ARGON was a series of reconnaissance satellites produced by the United States from February 1961 to August 1964. The KH-5 operated similarly to the CORONA series of satellites, as it ejected a canister of photographic film. At least 12 missions were attempted, but at least 7 resulted in failure. The satellite was manufactured by Lockheed. Launches used Thor-Agena launch vehicles flying from Vandenberg Air Force Base, with the payload being integrated into the Agena.

== Payload ==
Different versions of the satellite varied in mass from 1,110 to 1,500 kg (2,450 to 3,310 lb). At least two missions deployed ELINT subsatellites. Ground resolution for the satellite was 140 m (460 ft), with a swath of 556 km (345 mi). The onboard camera had a focal length of 76 mm. The purpose of the system, which produced relatively low-resolution images compared to other spy satellites, was to provide imagery for cartography purposes. This was one of the tasks that had originally been planned for the SAMOS series of satellites equipped with the (quickly cancelled) E-4 cameras. Each satellite took photographs for less than a week before returning its film.

The satellite was in use during the same period as the KH-2 to KH-4A CORONA and the KH-6 LANYARD satellites. Later satellites were the KH-4B and KH-7 GAMBIT. Images from three of the successful missions returned the first images of Antarctica from space.

== Satellites ==
Discoverer 20 (KH-5 9014A), was a USAF photographic reconnaissance satellite under the supervision of the National Reconnaissance Office (NRO). Discoverer 20 was the first KH-5 ARGON satellite to be launched. The launch occurred at 20:24:00 GMT on 17 February 1961. A Thor DM-21 Agena-B launch vehicle was used, flying from LC 75-3-4 at the Vandenberg Air Force Base. It was assigned the Harvard designation 1961 Epsilon 1. Discoverer 20 was operated in an Earth orbit, with a perigee of 283 km (176 mi), an apogee of 770 km (480 mi), 80.91° of inclination, and a period of 95.81 minutes. The satellite was equipped with a camera with a focal length of 76 mm, which had a resolution of 140 m (460 ft). Images were recorded onto 127 mm film, and were to have been returned in a Satellite Recovery Vehicle (SRV) before the satellite ceased operations. The satellite weighed 1,110 kg (2,450 lb). Recovery of the capsule was not attempted due to a system malfunction, and thus the scientific experiment data obtained were limited. Discoverer 20 decayed on 28 July 1962.

== Launches ==
Name	Launch Date	NSSDC ID	Alt Name	Alt Name	Mass (kg)	Decay Date	Notes
KH-5 9014A	1961-02-17	1961-005A	Discoverer 20	1961 Epsilon 1	1110	1962-07-28	Film capsule not ejected.
KH-5 9016A	1961-04-08	1961-011A	Discoverer 23	1961 Lambda 1	1150	1962-04-16	Film capsule ejected into wrong orbit, not recovered.
KH-5 9018A	1961-06-08	DISC24	Discoverer 24	1961-F05	1150	---	Failed to orbit.
KH-5 9020A	1961-07-21	DISC27	Discoverer 27	1961-F07	1150	---	Failed to orbit.
KH-5 9034A	1962-05-15	1962-018A	FTV 1126	1962 Sigma	1150	1962-06-20	Successful.
KH-5 9042A	1962-09-01	1962-044A	FTV 1132	1962 A Upsilon	1150	1962-10-01	Film capsule sank.
KH-5 9046A	1962-10-09	1962-053A	FTV 1134	1962 B Epsilon	1500	1962-10-17	Successful.
KH-5 9055A	1963-04-26	1963-004X	OPS 1008	1963-F07	1150	---	Failed to orbit.
KH-5 9058A	1963-08-29	1963-035A	OPS 1561		1000	1963-09-30	Successful; deployed ELINT subsatellite.
KH-5 9059A	1963-10-29	1963-042A	OPS 2437		1500	1963-11-29	Successful; deployed ELINT subsatellite.
KH-5 9065A	1964-06-13	1964-030A	OPS 3236		1500	1964-07-14	Successful.
KH-5 9066A	1964-08-21	1964-048A	OPS 2739		1500	1964-09-20	Successful.

== See also ==
- KH-1 thru KH-4B CORONA
- KH-6 LANYARD
- KH-7 GAMBIT-1
- KH-8 GAMBIT-3
- KH-9 HEXAGON or Big Bird
- KH-10 DORIAN or Manned Orbital Laboratory
- KH-11
- Satellite imagery
- Cold War
