= NIIRS =

US scale for rating image quality

The National Imagery Interpretability Rating Scale (NIIRS) is an American subjective scale used for rating the quality of imagery acquired from various types of imaging systems. The NIIRS defines different levels of image quality/interpretability based on the types of tasks an analyst can perform with images of a given NIIRS rating. The idea is that imagery analysts should be able to perform more demanding interpretation tasks as the quality of the imagery increases. It is published as part of the Federation of American Scientists Intelligence Resource Program.

The NIIRS consists of 10 levels, from 0 (worst quality) to 9 (best quality).

Because different types of imagery support different types of interpretation tasks, individual NIIRS has been developed for four major imaging types: Visible, Radar, Infrared, and Multispectral.

== NIIRS Scale ==
National Imagery Interpretability Rating Scale (NIIRS)	Ground Resolved Distance (GRD)
0	Image can not be interpreted because of obscuration, degradation, or very poor resolution
1	> 9.0 meters
2	4.5 - 9.0 meters
3	2.5 - 4.5 meters
4	1.2 - 2.5 meters
5	0.75 - 1.2 meters
6	0.40 - 0.75 meters
7	0.20 - 0.40 meters
8	0.10 - 0.20 meters
9	< 0.10 meters
