= KH-7 Gambit =

Series of United States reconnaissance satellites

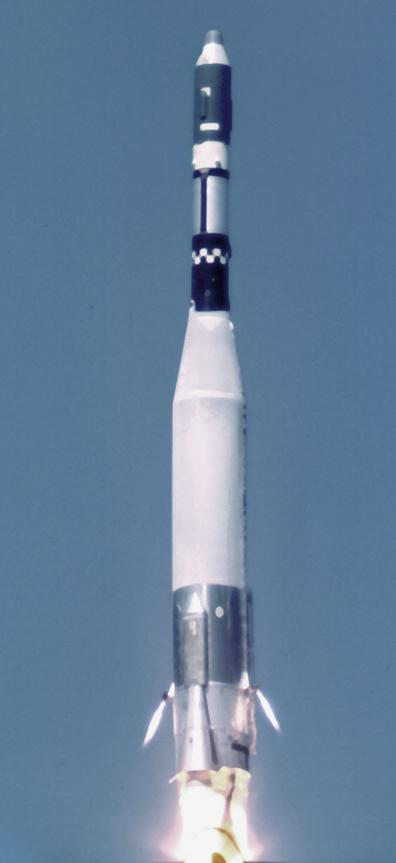
KH7-13 launch on Atlas-Agena

BYEMAN codenamed GAMBIT, the KH-7 (Air Force Program 206) was a reconnaissance satellite used by the United States from July 1963 to June 1967. Like the older CORONA system, it acquired imagery intelligence by taking photographs and returning the undeveloped film to earth. It achieved a typical ground-resolution of 2 ft (0.61 m) to 3 ft (0.91 m). In 2002, all KH-7 satellite imagery, with the exception of some facilities in Israel, was declassified. Other details of the satellite program and construction remained classified until 2011.

In its summary report following the conclusion of the program, the National Reconnaissance Office concluded that the GAMBIT program was considered highly successful in that it produced the first high-resolution satellite photography, 69.4% of the images having a resolution under 3 ft (0.91 m); its record of successful launches, orbits, and recoveries far surpassed the records of earlier systems; and it advanced the state of the art to the point where follow-on larger systems could be developed and flown successfully. The report also stated that Gambit had provided the intelligence community with the first high-resolution satellite photography of denied areas, the intelligence value of which was considered "extremely high". In particular, its overall success stood in sharp contrast to the two first-generation photoreconnaissance programs, Corona, which suffered far too many malfunctions to achieve any consistent success, and SAMOS, which was essentially a complete failure with all satellites either being lost in launch mishaps or returning no usable imagery.

GAMBIT emerged in 1962 as an alternative to the less-than-successful CORONA and the completely failed SAMOS, although CORONA was not cancelled and in fact continued operating alongside the newer program into the early 1970s. While CORONA used the Thor-Agena launch vehicle family, GAMBIT would be launched on Atlas-Agena, the booster used for SAMOS. After the improved KH-8 GAMBIT-3 satellite was developed during 1965, operations shifted to the larger Titan IIIB launch vehicle.

== System configuration ==
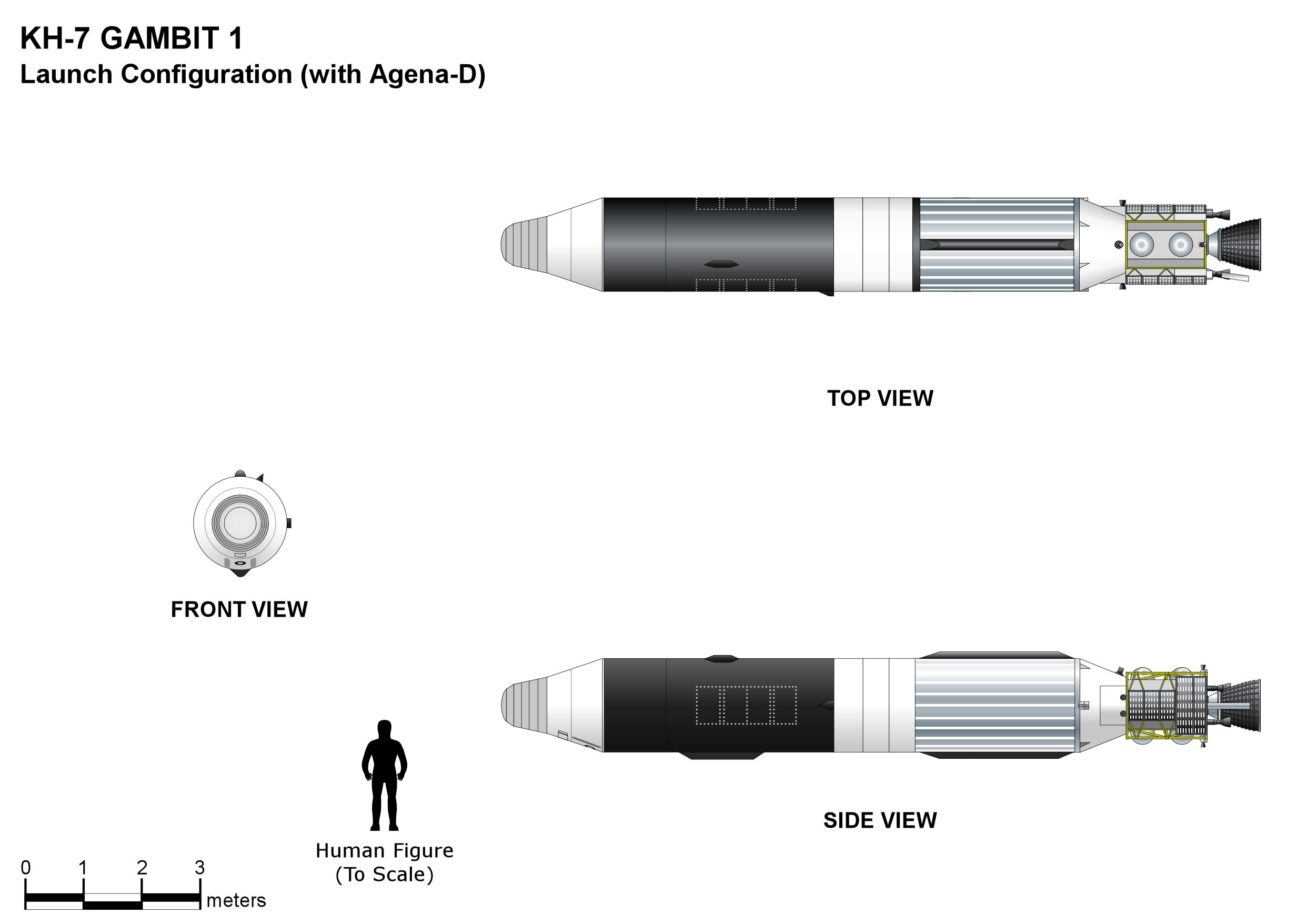
A KH-7 GAMBIT-1 launch configuration (with Agena D service module).

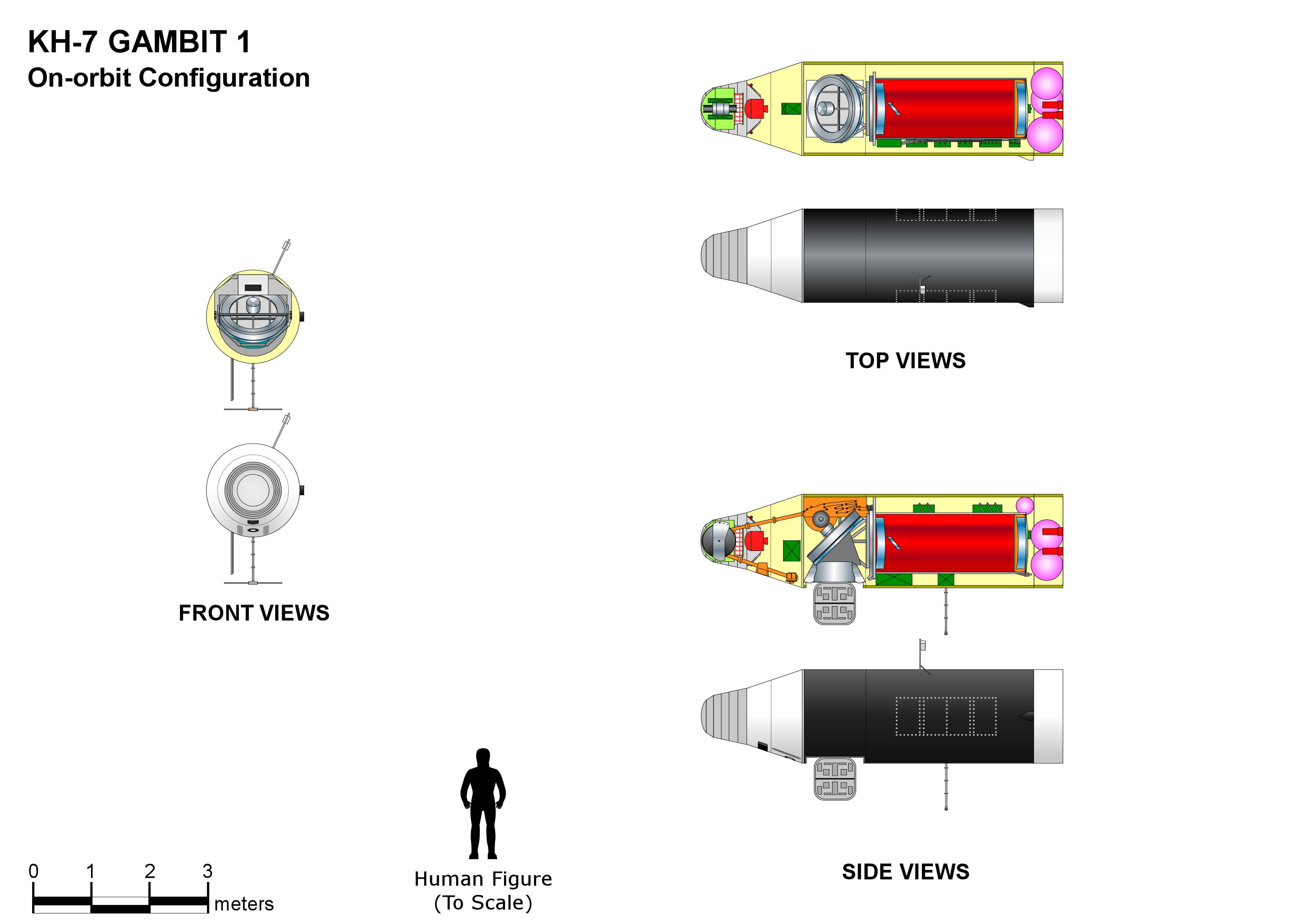
A KH-7 GAMBIT-1 on-orbit configuration (w/o Agena D service module).

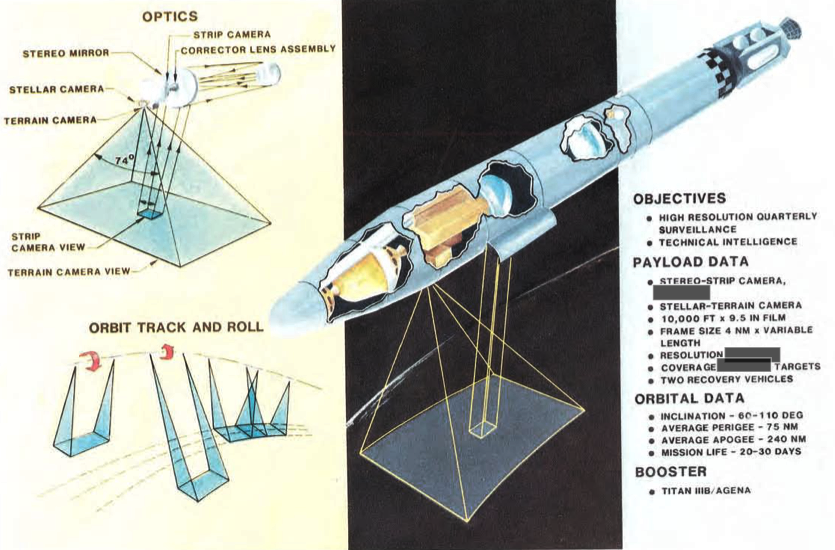
A GAMBIT Reconnaissance System.

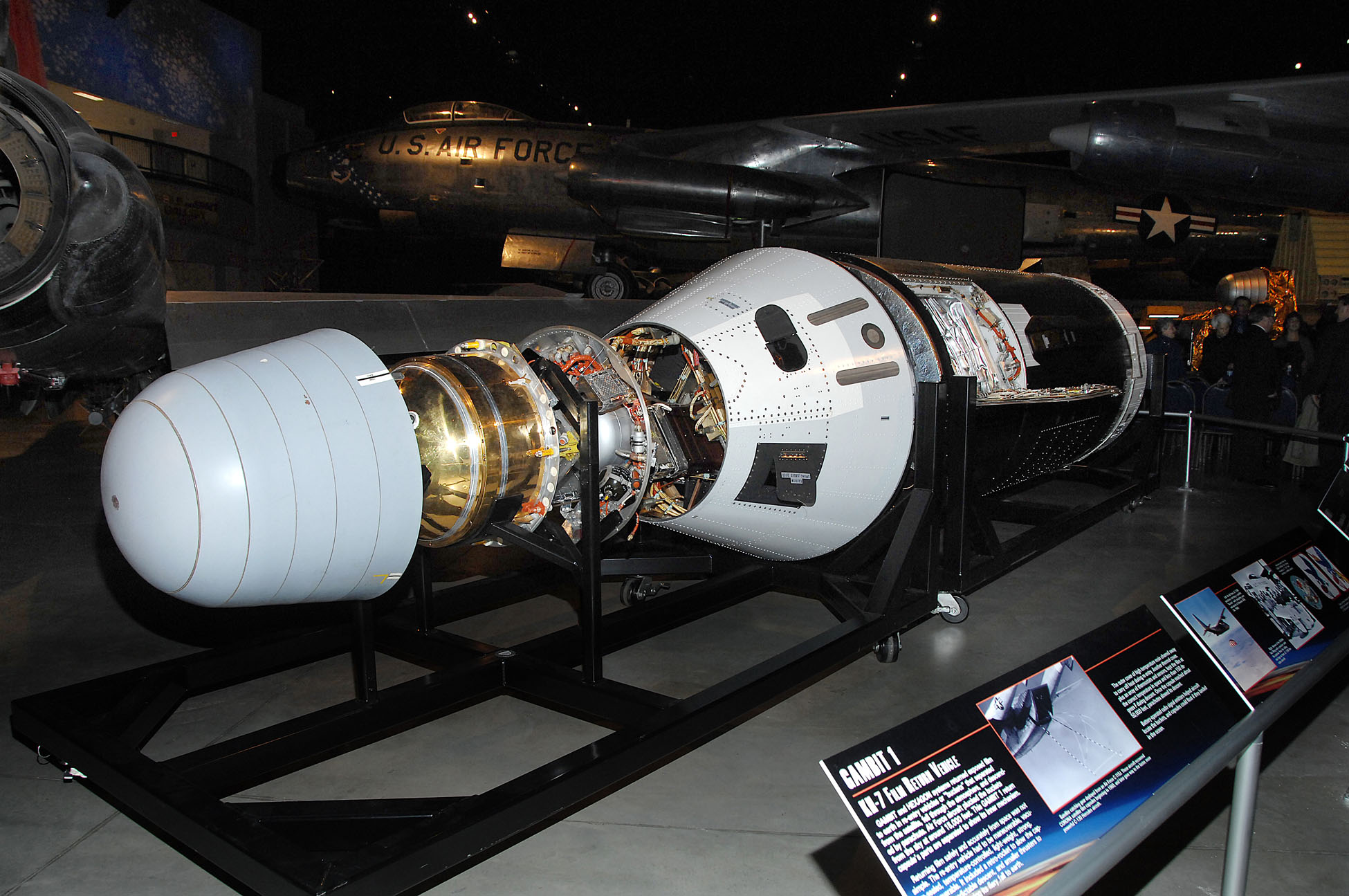
A KH-7 GAMBIT in launch configuration on display at the National Museum of the United States Air Force in Dayton, Ohio.

Each GAMBIT-1 satellite was about 15 ft (4.6 m) long, 5 ft (1.5 m) wide, weighed about 1,154 lb (523 kg), and carried about 3,000 ft (910 m) of film.

A feasibility study for the Geodetic Orbital Photographic Satellite System reveals three subsystems for U.S. optical reconnaissance satellites in the 1960s: the Orbital (or Orbiting) Control Vehicle (OCV), the Data Collection Module (DCM), and the Recovery Section (RS). For the KH-7, the DCM is also called the Camera Optics Module (COM), and is integrated in the OCV, which has a length of 5.5 m (18 ft) and a diameter of 1.52 m (5 ft 0 in).

=== Camera Optics Module ===
The Camera Optics Module of KH-7 consists of three cameras: a single strip camera, a stellar camera, and an index camera.

In the strip camera the ground image is reflected by a steerable flat mirror to a 1.21 m (4 ft 0 in) diameter stationary concave primary mirror. The primary mirror reflects the light through an opening in the flat mirror and through a Ross corrector. It took images of a 6.3° wide ground swath by exposing a 22 cm (8.7 in) wide moving portion of film through a small slit aperture. The initial ground resolution of the satellite was 1.2 m (3 ft 11 in), but improved to 0.6 m (2 ft 0 in) by 1966. Each satellite weighed about 2,000 kg (4,400 lb), and returned a single film bucket per mission. The camera and film transport system were manufactured by Eastman Kodak Company.

The index camera is a copy of cameras systems previously used in the KH-4 and KH-6 satellites, and takes exposures of Earth in direction of the vehicle roll position for attitude determination. The stellar camera takes images of star fields with a reseau grid being superimposed on the image plane. The S/I camera was provided by Itek, and horizon sensors were provided by Barnes Engineering Co.

=== Orbital Control Vehicle and Recovery Vehicle ===
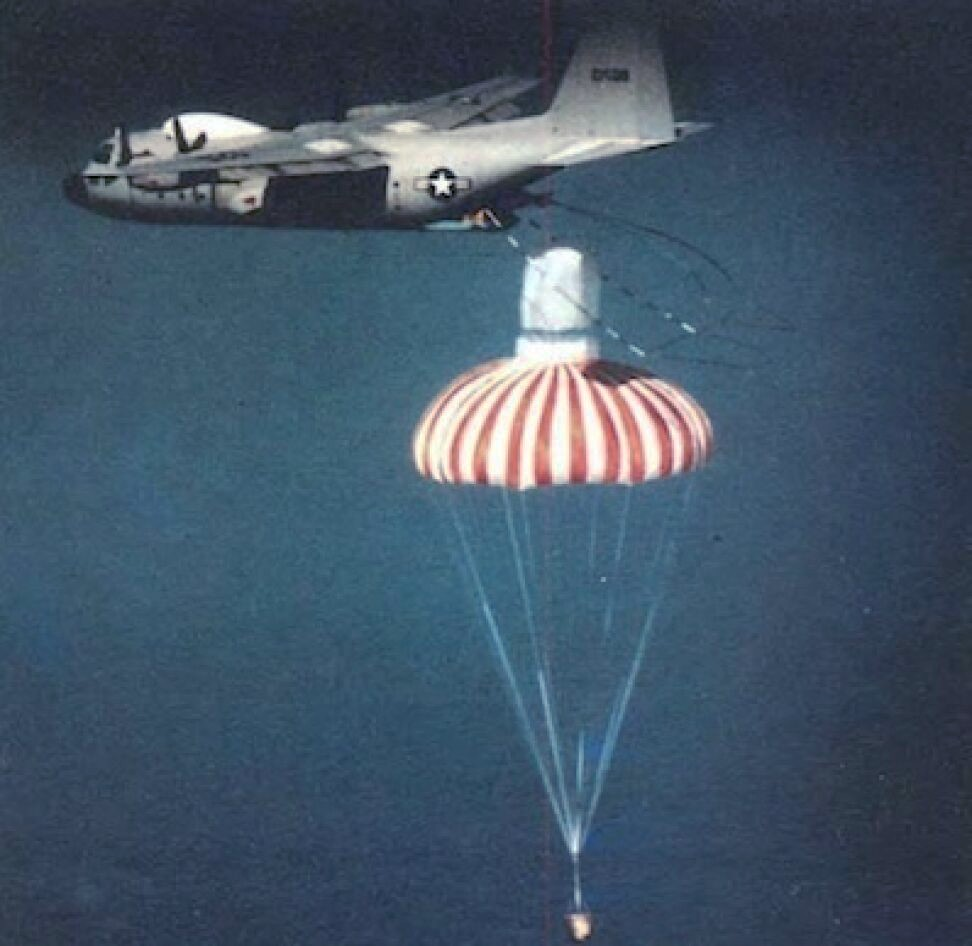
A film capsule being retrieved.

The primary contractor for the Orbital Control Vehicle and the Recovery Vehicle was General Electric. Films were to be retrieved mid-air by a C-130 Hercules specially outfitted for that purpose.

== Mission ==
All KH-7 satellites were launched from Point Arguello, which became part of Vandenberg Air Force Base in July 1964. KH-7 satellites flew 38 missions, numbered 4001-4038, of which 34 returned film, and of these, 30 returned usable imagery. Mission duration was 1 to 8 days. KH-7 satellites logged a total of almost 170 operational days in orbit.

== Functionality ==
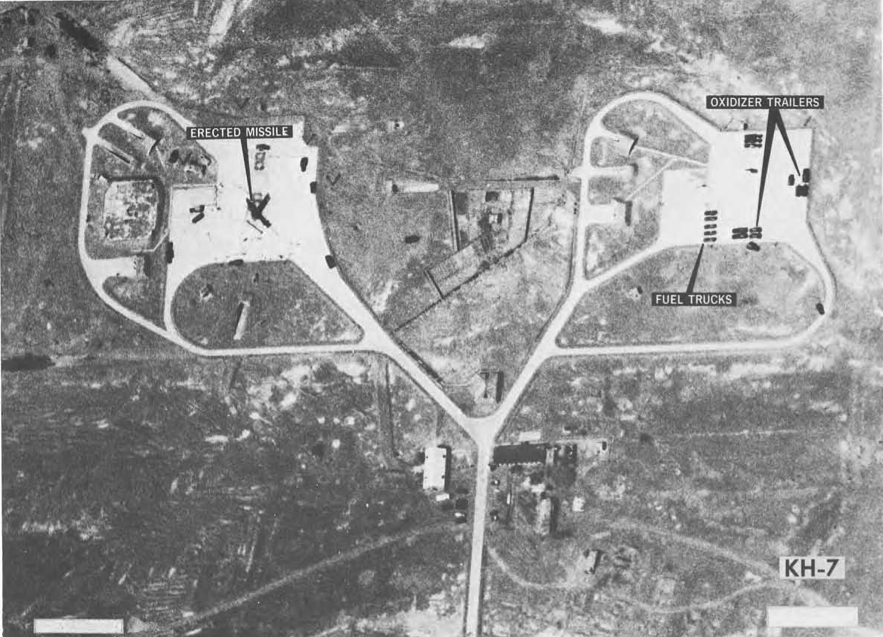
A KH-7 image of the Chinese Shuanchengtzu Missile Center A, May 1967.

A high-resolution instrument, the KH-7 took detailed pictures of "hot spots" and most of its photographs are of Chinese and Soviet nuclear and missile installations, with smaller amounts of coverage of cities and harbors. Most of the imagery from this camera, amounting to 19,000 images, was declassified in 2002 as a result of Executive order 12951, the same order which declassified CORONA, and copies of the films were transferred to the U.S. Geological Survey's Earth Resources Observation Systems office. Approximately 100 frames covering the state of Israel remain classified.

In early 1964, the CIA toyed with the idea of using GAMBIT to photograph military installations in Cuba, but this was dismissed as unworkable as the satellites were primarily designed with higher-latitude Soviet territory in mind and because it would mean wasting an entire satellite on the Latin America-Caribbean area which had little else of interest to U.S. intelligence services. It was decided that U-2 spyplane flights were adequate to provide coverage of Cuban activity.

== ELINT subsatellite ==
Mission 4009 included an ELINT P-11 subsatellite for radar monitoring, which was launched into a higher orbit.

== List of launches ==
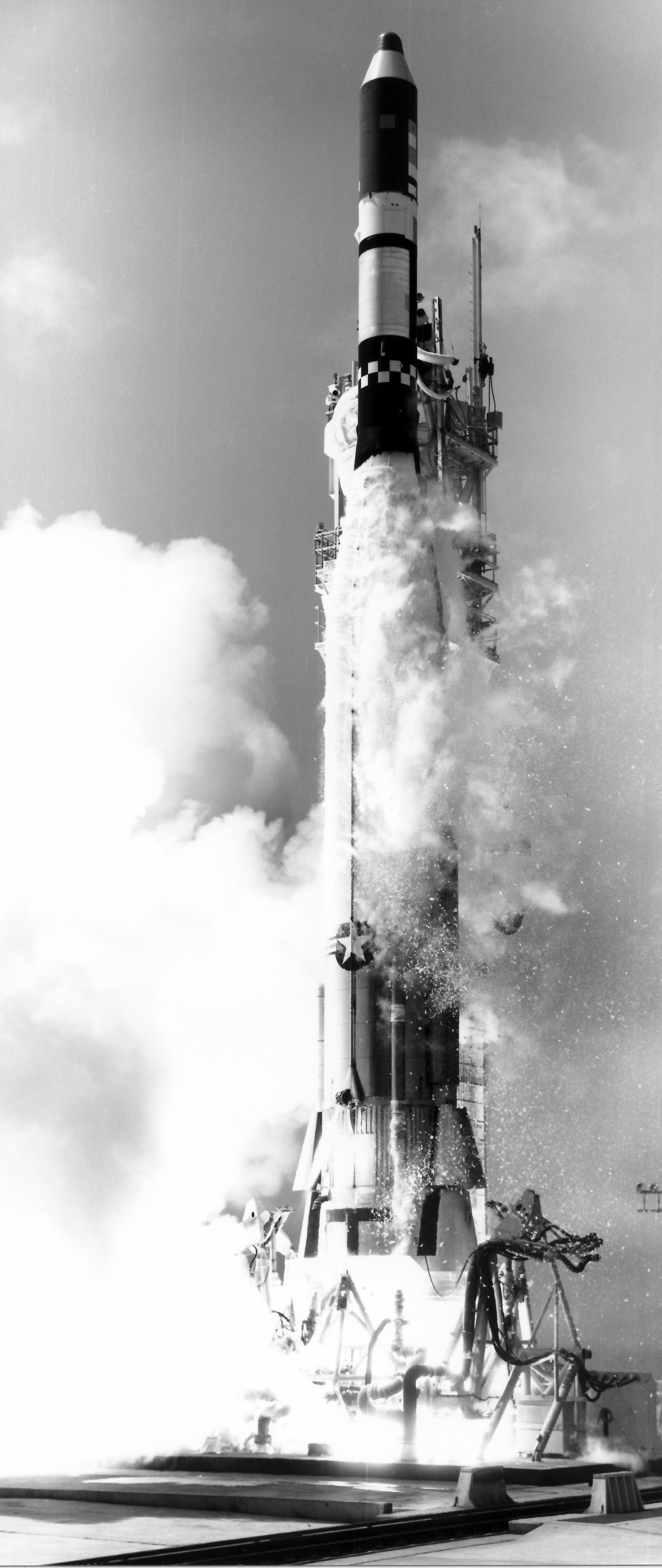
A KH-7 GAMBIT optical reconnaissance satellite.

Name	Mission No.	Launch Date	Alt. Name	NSSDC ID No.	Launch Vehicle	Perigee (km)	Apogee (km)	Inclination (deg)
KH7-1	4001	1963-07-12	OPS-1467	1963-028A	Atlas-Agena D	164	164	95.4
KH7-2	4002	1963-09-06	OPS-1947	1963-036A	Atlas Agena D	168	263	94.4
KH7-3	4003	1963-10-25	OPS-2196	1963-041A	Atlas Agena D	144	332	99.1
KH7-4	4004	1963-12-18	OPS-2372	1963-051A	Atlas Agena D	122	266	97.9
KH7-5	4005	1964-02-25	OPS-2423	1964-009A	Atlas Agena D	173	190	95.7
KH7-6	4006	1964-03-11	OPS-3435	1964-012A	Atlas Agena D	163	203	95.8
KH7-7	4007	1964-04-23	OPS-3743	1964-020A	Atlas Agena D	150	366	103.6
KH7-8	4008	1964-05-19	OPS-3592	1964-024A	Atlas Agena D	141	380	101.1
KH7-9	4009	1964-07-06	OPS-3684	1964-036A	Atlas Agena D	121	346	92.9
KH7-10	4010	1964-08-14	OPS-3802	1964-045A	SLV-3 Agena D	149	307	95.5
KH7-11	4011	1964-09-23	OPS-4262	1964-058A	SLV-3 Agena D	145	303	92.9
KH7-12	4012	1964-10-08	OPS-4036	1964-F11	SLV-3 Agena D	---	---	---
KH7-13	4013	1964-10-23	OPS-4384	1964-068A	Atlas Agena D	139	271	88.6
KH7-14	4014	1964-12-04	OPS-4439	1964-079A	SLV-3 Agena D	158	357	97
KH7-15	4015	1965-01-23	OPS-4703	1965-005A	SLV-3 Agena D	146	291	102.5
KH7-16	4016	1965-03-12	OPS-4920	1965-019A	SLV-3 Agena D	93	155	
KH7-17	4017	1965-04-28	OPS-4983	1965-031A	SLV-3 Agena D	180	259	95.7
KH7-18	4018	1965-05-27	OPS-5236	1965-041A	SLV-3 Agena D	149	267	95.8
KH7-19	4019	1965-06-25	OPS-5501	1965-050B	SLV-3 Agena D	151	283	107.6
KH7-20	4020	1965-07-12	OPS-5810	1965-F07	SLV-3 Agena D	---	---	---
KH7-21	4021	1965-08-03	OPS-5698	1965-062A	SLV-3 Agena D	149	307	107.5
KH7-22	4022	1965-09-30	OPS-7208	1965-076A	SLV-3 Agena D	98	164	95.6
KH7-23	4023	1965-11-08	OPS-6232	1965-090B	SLV-3 Agena D	145	277	93.9
KH7-24	4024	1966-01-19	OPS-7253	1966-002A	SLV-3 Agena D	150	269	93.9
KH7-25	4025	1966-02-15	OPS-1184	1966-012A	SLV-3 Agena D	148	293	96.5
KH7-26	4026	1966-03-18	OPS-0879	1966-022A	SLV-3 Agena D	162	208	101
KH7-27	4027	1966-04-19	OPS-0910	1966-032A	SLV-3 Agena D	139	312	116.9
KH7-28	4028	1966-05-14	OPS-1950	1966-039A	SLV-3 Agena D	133	358	110.5
KH7-29	4029	1966-06-03	OPS-1577	1966-048A	SLV-3 Agena D	143	288	86.9
KH7-30	4030	1966-07-12	OPS-1850	1966-062A	SLV-3 Agena D	137	236	95.5
KH7-31	4031	1966-08-16	OPS-1832	1966-074A	SLV-3 Agena D	146	358	93.3
KH7-32	4032	1966-09-16	OPS-1686	1966-083A	SLV-3 Agena D	148	333	93.9
KH7-33	4033	1966-10-12	OPS-2055	1966-090A	SLV-3 Agena D	155	287	91
KH7-34	4034	1966-11-02	OPS-2070	1966-098A	SLV-3 Agena D	159	305	91
KH7-35	4035	1966-12-05	OPS-1890	1966-109A	SLV-3 Agena D	137	388	104.6
KH7-36	4036	1967-02-02	OPS-4399	1967-007A	SLV-3 Agena D	136	357	102.4
KH7-37	4037	1967-05-22	OPS-4321	1967-050A	SLV-3 Agena D	135	293	91.5
KH7-38	4038	1967-06-04	OPS-4360	1967-055A	SLV-3 Agena D	149	456	104.8

(NSSDC ID Numbers: See COSPAR)

== History ==
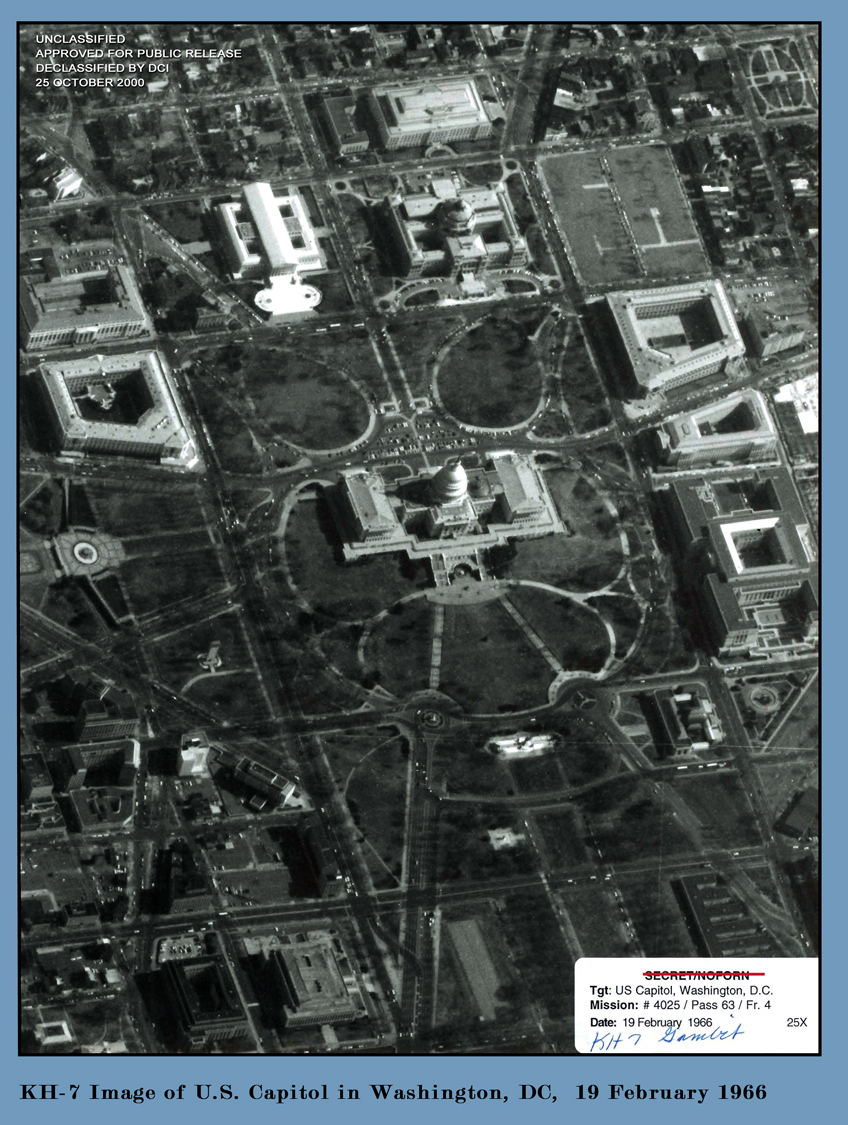
An enlargement of a photograph of the U.S. Capitol taken by KH-7 mission 4025 on 19 February 1966.

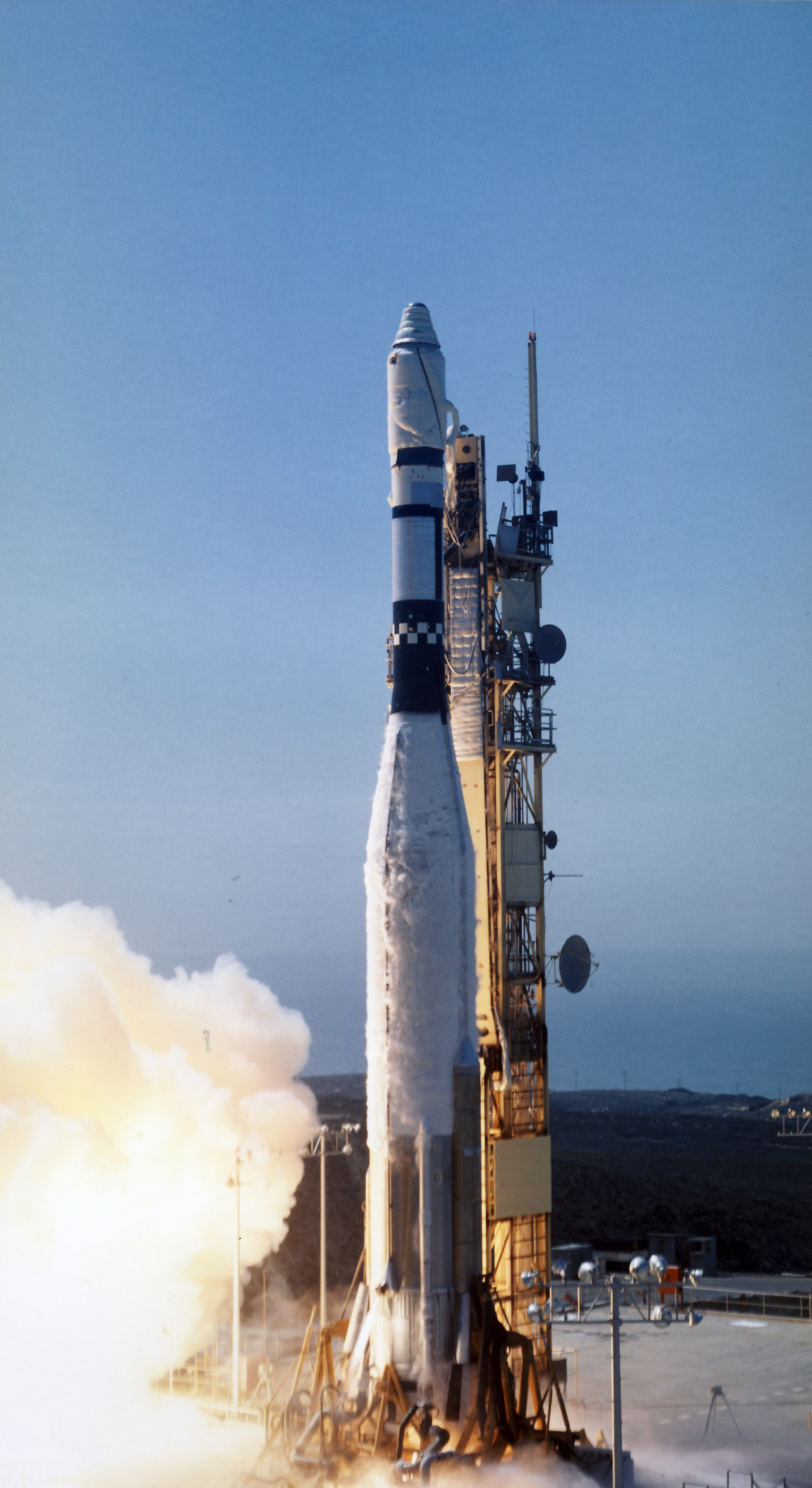
A KH-7 GAMBIT optical reconnaissance satellite.

Section source: Space Review

GAMBIT marked the first use of next-generation launch vehicle systems as Convair and Lockheed, the builders of the Atlas-Agena booster, began introducing improved, standardized launchers to replace the multitude of customized variants used up to 1963, which caused endless mix ups, poor reliability, and mission failures. This followed a recommendation by the Lewis Spaceflight Center in Cleveland, Ohio that Atlas and Agena switch to one standard configuration for both NASA and Air Force launches, with uniform testing and checkout procedures, as well as improved materials and fabrication processes for the various hardware components in the boosters. The Agena D, a standardized Agena B, arrived first, with the uprated Atlas SLV-3 taking another year to fly. The first eight GAMBIT flown still used custom-modified Atlas D ICBM cores, with GAMBIT 4010 in August 1964 being the first use of the SLV-3. Afterwards, all GAMBIT used SLV-3s aside from 4013, which used the last old-style Atlas remaining in the inventory.

In early 1963, the GAMBIT program began with failures. On 11 May 1963, the first GAMBIT satellite sat atop Atlas-Agena 190D on SLC-4W at Vandenberg Air Force Base awaiting launch. An air bubble formed while loading LOX into the booster and as soon as propellant filling was stopped, the bubble damaged the fill/drain valve. This quickly caused both the LOX and helium pressure gas to escape from the tank, depressurizing the Atlas's balloon skin and causing the entire launch vehicle to crumple to the ground. The RP-1 tank ruptured and spilled its contents onto the pad. There was no fire or explosion, but the Agena sustained minor damage and the satellite a considerable amount as the cameras were crushed in by impact with the ground and had their lenses destroyed. The pad itself was undamaged except for a steel beam cracked by exposure to the super-chilled LOX, which was repaired in two days. Fortunately, the satellite on the booster was not the same one planned for the actual launch and the payload shroud had also remained in one piece, preventing any unauthorized parties from seeing the GAMBIT. Secrecy surrounding the program was strict and knowledge of GAMBIT limited only to those directly involved in the program. While the early CORONA and SAMOS flights had been merely billed to the public as scientific missions, it became increasingly difficult to explain why they failed to return any scientific data. In late 1961, President John F. Kennedy ordered a veil of secrecy placed around the photoreconnaissance program and by GAMBIT's debut in 1963, DoD announcements described no details other than the launching of a "classified payload".

The Agena was sent back to Lockheed for repairs and a different Atlas (vehicle 201D) was used, and the first successful GAMBIT mission was launched on 12 July 1963. The launch vehicle performed perfectly and inserted GAMBIT into polar orbit with a 189 km (117 mi) altitude. The Air Force designated this mission number 4001.

Aerospace Corporation recommended that, during GAMBIT's first flights, the Orbital Control Vehicle (OCV) should remain attached to the Agena. This was a proven successful process for other Agena tests; and whereas the OCV was not. This decision limited GAMBIT's functionality, meaning that photographs could only be taken of targets directly below the vehicle. Once the successful photographic phase of the mission 4002 was completed, the OCV and the Agena were separated and the reentry vehicle would come down into the ocean northwest of Hawaii. The re-entry vehicle was caught in mid-air with a C-130 Hercules aircraft using a modified version of the Fulton surface-to-air recovery system. The film canister was then immediately transported to Eastman Kodak's Hawkeye facility in Rochester, New York for processing. The developed results was sent to US Air Force imagery research analysts in Washington, DC.

GAMBIT mission 4003, was launched on 25 October 1963. The film canister was again ejected successfully after the photographic phase and the capsule recovered by an aircraft. Other tests were carried out with the OCV.

GAMBIT mission 4004 was launched and its film canister recovered on 18 December 1963. Missions 4005 through 4007 were also successful.

In May 1964, mission 4008 suffered major problems when the Agena did an unexplained roll during the boost phase. Even with OCV system problems, the film canister was able to return some imagery.

A variety of problems occurred with many of the remaining missions including poor or no imagery. Many of these difficulties were caused by the unreliable wire recording system carried by the GAMBITs (tape recorders were not yet in widespread use in the mid-1960s). Two satellites ended up in the Pacific Ocean. The first of them was 4012, launched on October 8, 1964. The Agena engine shut down after 1.5 seconds of operation and the GAMBIT did not attain orbit. An investigation of the failure found that an electrical short occurred in an engine relay box, resulting in a cutoff signal being issued 0.4 seconds after ignition. As soon as the engine arming command was stopped at 1.5 seconds, the Agena propulsion system shut down. Examination of factory records for the Agena found that a pair of metal screws from a little-used terminal connector had broken off and disappeared to parts unknown; it was speculated that they landed somewhere as to cause a short. Telemetry data indicated otherwise entirely normal performance of all Agena systems. The other failure was 4020, launched on 12 July 1965 when the Atlas programmer accidentally issued simultaneous SECO and BECO commands, the resultant propulsion system shutdown sending the launch vehicle into the Pacific Ocean some 1,090 km (680 mi) downrange. The latter was the first flight witnessed by newly arrived Brig. Gen John L. Martin who replaced Maj. Gen Robert Greer as head of the KH-7 program. Martin cracked down and began demanding higher workmanship and quality standards. He is credited with having significantly improved the success rate of the program.

It was noted that the GAMBIT flights through the first half of 1964 had been mostly successful, but a string of malfunctions occurred starting in the second half of the year and continuing through the first half of 1965. These included the two above-mentioned launch failures plus GAMBIT 4013 which did not return any imagery and GAMBIT 4014 which suffered a battery explosion. GAMBIT 4019 did not return any imagery either. Eventually, it was determined that the culprit was an extra structure added to the SLC-4W umbilical tower that sent resonant vibration through the Atlas-Agena stack at liftoff, jarring random components in the booster and/or spacecraft loose.

The KH-7 GAMBIT was an overall success, even with some failures; thus providing National Reconnaissance Office and the President with quality intelligence collection. Following KH-7 projects had greatly improved major upgrades in the spacecraft and its camera systems.

== Cost ==
The total cost of the 38 flight KH-7 program from FY1963 to FY1967, without non-recurring costs, and excluding five GAMBIT cameras sold to NASA, was US$651.4 million in 1963 dollars (inflation adjusted US$ 6.85 billion present day). Non-recurring costs for industrial facilities, development, and one-time support amounted to 24.3% of the total program cost, or US$209.1 million. The resulting total program costs were US$860.5 million in 1963 dollars (inflation adjusted US$ 9.05 billion present day).

== Other U.S. imaging spy satellites ==
- CORONA series: KH-1, KH-2, KH-3, KH-4
- KH-5 ARGON
- KH-8 GAMBIT-3 (concurrent operations)
- KH-9 HEXAGON or "Big Bird"
- KH-10 DORIAN or Manned Orbital Laboratory
- KH-11 KENNEN, KH-12, KH-13
- SAMOS

== See also ==
- Satellite imagery
- Cold War
- First images of Earth from space
