= List of Thor DM-21 Agena-B launches =

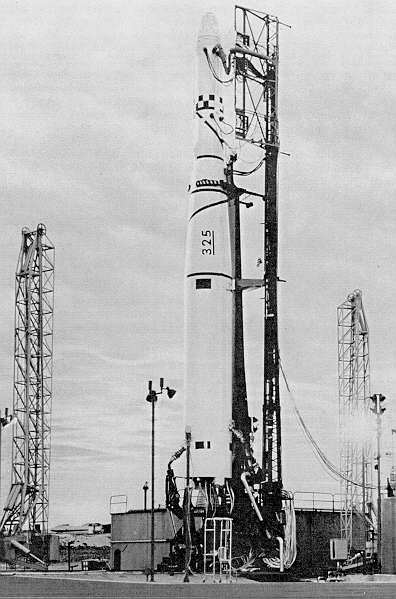
Thor Agena B with Discoverer 36 on the launch pad (Dec. 12 1961)

Thor DM-21 Agena-B or just Thor-Agena was a series of orbital launch vehicles. The rockets used the Douglas-built Thor first stage and the Lockheed-built Agena second stages. The series includes a variant with Solid Rocket Boosters (TAT Agena-B or Thor-SLV2A Agena-B)They are thus cousins of the more-famous Thor-Deltas, which founded the Delta rocket family. The first attempted launch of a Thor DM-21 Agena-B was in January 1959. The first successful launch was on 28 February 1959, launching Discoverer 17.

== Launch statistics ==
=== Launch outcome ===
- Success
- Failure
- Partial Failure

=== Launchpad ===
- VAFB LC-75-3-4
- VAFB LC-75-3-5
- VAFB LC-75-1-1

=== Orbit ===
- LEO
- MEO

=== Function ===
- Reconnaissance
- Technology
- Amateur radio
- ELINT
- Ionospheric

== Launch history ==
The data in this table comes from and "Thor-SLV2A Agena-B". Gunter's Space Page.
Date/Time (UTC)	Rocket	S/N	Launch site	Payload	Function	Orbit	Outcome	Remarks
1960-10-26; 20:26	Thor DM-21 Agena-B	Thor 253; Agena 1061	VAFB LC-75-3-4	Discoverer 16	Reconnaissance	LEO	Failure	Maiden flight of Thor-Agena B. Agena staging failed. Vehicle fell into the Pacific Ocean.
1960-11-12; 20:43	Thor DM-21 Agena-B	Thor 297; Agena 1062	VAFB LC-75-3-5	Discoverer 17	Reconnaissance	LEO	Success	
1960-12-07; 20:20:58	Thor DM-21 Agena-B	Thor 296; Agena 1103	VAFB LC-75-3-4	Discoverer 18	Reconnaissance	LEO	Success	
1960-12-20; 20:32	Thor DM-21 Agena-B	Thor 258; Agena 1101	VAFB LC-75-3-5	Discoverer 19	Technology	LEO	Success	
1961-02-17; 20:25	Thor DM-21 Agena-B	Thor 298	VAFB LC-75-3-4	Discoverer 20	Reconnaissance	LEO	Success	
1961-02-18; 22:58	Thor DM-21 Agena-B	Thor 261; Agena 1102	VAFB LC-75-3-5	Discoverer 21	Technology	LEO	Success	
1961-03-30; 20:34:43	Thor DM-21 Agena-B	Thor 300; Agena 1105	VAFB LC-75-3-4	Discoverer 22	Reconnaissance	LEO	Failure	Agena control failure.
1961-04-08; 19:21	Thor DM-21 Agena-B	Thor 307; Agena 1106	VAFB LC-75-3-5	Discoverer 23	Reconnaissance	LEO	Success	
1961-06-08; 21:16	Thor DM-21 Agena-B	Thor 302; Agena 1108	VAFB LC-75-3-4	Discoverer 24	Reconnaissance	LEO	Failure	Agena power failure
1961-06-16; 23:02	Thor DM-21 Agena-B	Thor 303; Agena 1107	VAFB LC-75-1-1	Discoverer 25	Reconnaissance	LEO	Success	
1961-07-07; 23:29:48	Thor DM-21 Agena-B	Thor 308; Agena 1109	VAFB LC-75-3-5	Discoverer 26	Reconnaissance	LEO	Success	
1961-07-21; 22:35	Thor DM-21 Agena-B	Thor 322; Agena 1110	VAFB LC-75-3-4	Discoverer 27	Reconnaissance	LEO	Failure	Open circuit in guidance computer led to loss of control and vehicle breakup at T+60 seconds.
1961-08-04; 00:01	Thor DM-21 Agena-B	Thor 309; Agena 1111	VAFB LC-75-1-1	Discoverer 28	Reconnaissance	LEO	Failure	Agena control system malfunctioned
1961-08-30; 20:00	Thor DM-21 Agena-B	Thor 323; Agena 1112	VAFB LC-75-3-4	Discoverer 29	Reconnaissance	LEO	Success	
1961-09-12; 19:59	Thor DM-21 Agena-B	Thor 310; Agena 1113	VAFB LC-75-3-5	Discoverer 30	Reconnaissance	LEO	Success	
1961-09-17; 21:00	Thor DM-21 Agena-B	Thor 324; Agena 1114	VAFB LC-75-1-1	Discoverer 31	Reconnaissance	LEO	Success	
1961-10-13; 19:22	Thor DM-21 Agena-B	Thor 328; Agena 1115	VAFB LC-75-3-4	Discoverer 32	Reconnaissance	LEO	Success	100th Thor launch
1961-10-23; 19:23	Thor DM-21 Agena-B	Thor 329; Agena 1116	VAFB LC-75-3-5	Discoverer 33	Reconnaissance	LEO	Failure	Agena hydraulics failure
1961-11-05; 20:00	Thor DM-21 Agena-B	Thor 330; Agena 1117	VAFB LC-75-1-1	Discoverer 34	Reconnaissance	LEO	Failure	Incorrect guidance program left the satellite in a useless orbit.
1961-11-15; 21:23	Thor DM-21 Agena-B	Thor 326; Agena 1118	VAFB LC-75-3-4	Discoverer 35	Reconnaissance	LEO	Success	
1961-12-12; 20:40	Thor DM-21 Agena-B	Thor 325; Agena 1119	VAFB LC-75-3-4	Discoverer 36; Oscar 1	Reconnaissance; Amateur radio satellite	LEO	Success	
1962-01-13; 21:41	Thor DM-21 Agena-B	Thor 327; Agena 1120	VAFB LC-75-3-4	Discoverer 37	Reconnaissance	LEO	Failure	Agena restart burn failed.
1962-02-21; 18:44	Thor DM-21 Agena-B	Thor 332; Agena 2301	VAFB LC-75-3-5	P-102 Group 0-D	ELINT	LEO	Partial failure	Upper stage failed to restart for circularization burn
1962-02-27; 19:39	Thor DM-21 Agena-B	Thor 241; Agena 1123	VAFB LC-75-3-4	Discoverer 38	Reconnaissance	LEO	Success	
1962-04-18; 00:54	Thor DM-21 Agena-B	Thor 331; Agena 1124	VAFB LC-75-3-5	Discoverer 39	Reconnaissance	LEO	Success	
1962-04-29; 00:30:12	Thor DM-21 Agena-B	Thor 333; Agena 1125	VAFB LC-75-3-4	FTV 1125	Reconnaissance	LEO	Success	
1962-05-15; 19:36	Thor DM-21 Agena-B	Thor 334; Agena 1126	VAFB LC-75-3-5	FTV 1126	Reconnaissance	LEO	Success	
1962-05-30; 01:00:04	Thor DM-21 Agena-B	Thor 336; Agena 1128	VAFB LC-75-1-1	FTV 1128	Reconnaissance	LEO	Success	
1962-06-02; 00:31	Thor DM-21 Agena-B	Thor 335; Agena 1127	VAFB LC-75-3-4	FTV 1127; Oscar 2	Reconnaissance; Amateur radio	LEO	Success	
1962-06-18; 20:20	Thor DM-21 Agena-B	Thor 343; Agena 2312	VAFB LC-75-3-5	P-102 Group 2-D 1	ELINT	LEO	Success	
1962-06-23; 00:30	Thor DM-21 Agena-B	Thor 339; Agena 1129	VAFB LC-75-3-4	FTV 1129	Reconnaissance	LEO	Success	
1962-07-21; 00:56	Thor DM-21 Agena-B	Thor 342; Agena 1130	VAFB LC-75-3-5	FTV 1130	Reconnaissance	LEO	Success	
1962-07-28; 00:30	Thor DM-21 Agena-B	Thor 347; Agena 1131	VAFB LC-75-3-4	FTV 1131	Reconnaissance	LEO	Success	
1962-09-01; 20:39	Thor DM-21 Agena-B	Thor 348; Agena 1132	VAFB LC-75-3-5	FTV 1132	Reconnaissance	LEO	Success	
1962-09-17; 23:46	Thor DM-21 Agena-B	Thor 350; Agena 1133	VAFB LC-75-3-4	FTV 1133; ERS-2	Reconnaissance; Technology	LEO	Success	
1962-09-29; 06:05	Thor DM-21 Agena-B	Thor 341; TA-1	VAFB LC-75-1-1	(Canada) Alouette 1 TAVE	Ionospheric; Technology	LEO	Success	
1962-10-09; 18:35	Thor DM-21 Agena-B	Thor 352; Agena 1134	VAFB LC-75-3-4	FTV 1134	Reconnaissance	LEO	Success	
1962-11-05; 22:04	Thor DM-21 Agena-B	Thor 356; Agena 1136	VAFB LC-75-3-4	FTV 1136	Reconnaissance	LEO	Success	
1962-11-24; 22:01	Thor DM-21 Agena-B	Thor 367; Agena 1135	VAFB LC-75-3-4	FTV 1135	Reconnaissance	LEO	Success	
1963-01-16; 21:59	Thor DM-21 Agena-B	Thor 363; Agena 2313	VAFB LC-75-3-5	P-698BK Group 1-D 1	ELINT	LEO	Success	
1963-06-29	TAT Agena-B	Thor 380	VAFB LC-75-3-5	P-698BK Group 1-D 2	ELINT	LEO	style="background: #9EFF9E; color:black; vertical-align: middle; text-align: center; " class="table-success" | Success	
1964-01-25	Thor DM-21 Agena-B	Thor 397	VAFB LC-75-1-1	Echo 2		MEO	Success	
1964-08-28	Thor DM-21 Agena-B	Thor 399	VAFB LC-75-1-1	Nimbus 1	Meteorological satellite	MEO	Partial failure	Short second-stage burn leading to an eccentric orbit
1965-11-29; 04:48	Thor DM-21 Agena-B	Thor 453; Agena 6102	VAFB LC-75-1-1	Alouette 2 / Explorer 31 (DME)	Ionospheric research satellite / Ionospheric research satellite	MEO	Success	
1966-05-15	TAT Agena-B	Thor 456	VAFB LC-75-1-1	Nimbus 2	Meteorological satellite	MEO	Success	
