= Discoverer 30 =

American optical reconnaissance satellite

- Mission type: Optical reconnaissance
- Operator: US Air Force/NRO
- Harvard designation: 1961 Omega 1
- COSPAR ID: 1961-024A
- SATCAT no.: 00182
- Mission duration: 2 days

Spacecraft properties
- Spacecraft type: KH-3 Corona'''
- Bus: Agena-B
- Manufacturer: Lockheed
- Launch mass: 1,150 kilograms (2,540 lb)

Start of mission
- Launch date: 12 September 1961, 19:59 UTC
- Rocket: Thor DM-21 Agena-B 310
- Launch site: Vandenberg LC-75-3-5

End of mission
- Decay date: 11 December 1961

Orbital parameters
- Reference system: Geocentric
- Regime: Low Earth
- Perigee altitude: 231 kilometers (144 mi)
- Apogee altitude: 484 kilometers (301 mi)
- Inclination: 82.6 degrees
- Period: 91.7 minutes

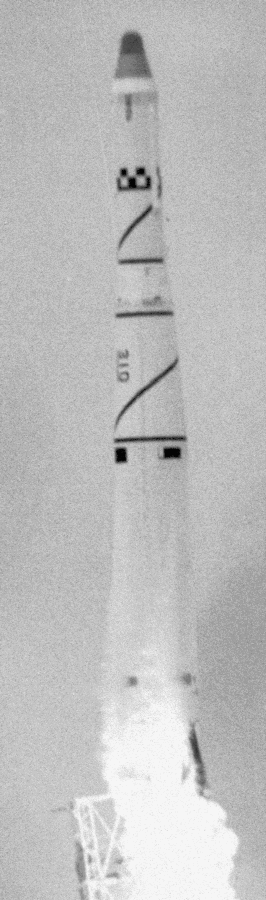
The launch of Discoverer 30

Discoverer 30, also known as Corona 9022, was an American optical reconnaissance satellite which was launched in 1961. It was a KH-3 Corona satellite, based on an Agena-B rocket.

The launch of Discoverer 30 occurred at 19:59 UTC on 12 September 1961. A Thor DM-21 Agena-B rocket was used, flying from Launch Complex 75-3-5 at the Vandenberg Air Force Base. Upon successfully reaching orbit, it was assigned the Harvard designation 1961 Omega 1.

Discoverer 30 was operated in a low Earth orbit, with a perigee of 231 kilometres (144 mi), an apogee of 484 kilometres (301 mi), 82.6 degrees of inclination, and a period of 91.7 minutes. The satellite had a mass of 1,150 kilograms (2,540 lb), and was equipped with a panoramic camera with a focal length of 61 centimetres (24 in), which had a maximum resolution of 7.6 metres (25 ft). Images were recorded onto 70-millimeter (2.8 in) film, and returned in a Satellite Recovery Vehicle two days after launch; however, like the previous mission, all of the images returned were found to be out of focus. The Satellite Recovery Vehicle used by Discoverer 30 was SRV-551. Once its images had been returned, Discoverer 30's mission was complete, and it remained in orbit until its decay on 11 December 1961.
