= Discoverer 37 =

American optical reconnaissance satellite

- Mission type: Optical reconnaissance
- Operator: US Air Force/NRO
- Mission duration: Failed to orbit

Spacecraft properties
- Spacecraft type: KH-3 Corona‴
- Bus: Agena-B
- Manufacturer: Lockheed
- Launch mass: 1,150 kilograms (2,540 lb)

Start of mission
- Launch date: 13 January 1962, 21:41 UTC
- Rocket: Thor DM-21 Agena-B 327
- Launch site: Vandenberg LC-75-3-4

Orbital parameters
- Reference system: Geocentric
- Regime: Low Earth
- Epoch: Planned

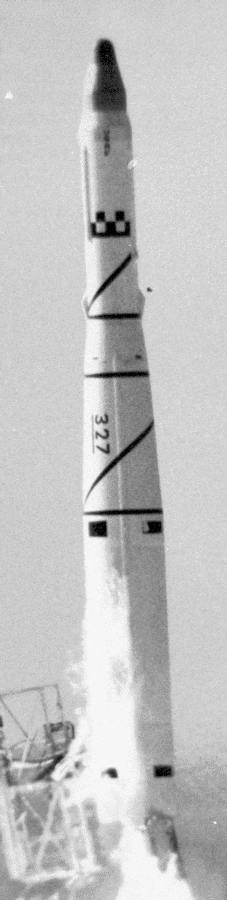
The launch of Discoverer 37

Discoverer 37, also known as Corona 9030, was an American optical reconnaissance satellite which was lost in a launch failure in 1962. It was the last KH-3 Corona satellite, which was based on an Agena-B rocket.

The launch of Discoverer 37 occurred at 21:41 UTC on 13 January 1962. A Thor DM-21 Agena-B rocket was used, flying from Launch Complex 75-3-4 at the Vandenberg Air Force Base; however, it failed to achieve orbit.

Discoverer 37 was intended to be operated in a low Earth orbit. It had a mass of 1,150 kilograms (2,540 lb), and was equipped with a panoramic camera with a focal length of 61 centimetres (24 in), which had a maximum resolution of 7.6 metres (25 ft). Images were to have been recorded onto 70-millimeter (2.8 in) film, and returned in a Satellite Recovery Vehicle at the end of the mission. The Satellite Recovery Vehicle which was to have been used by Discoverer 37 was SRV-571.
