= Discoverer 35 =

Reconnaissance satellite

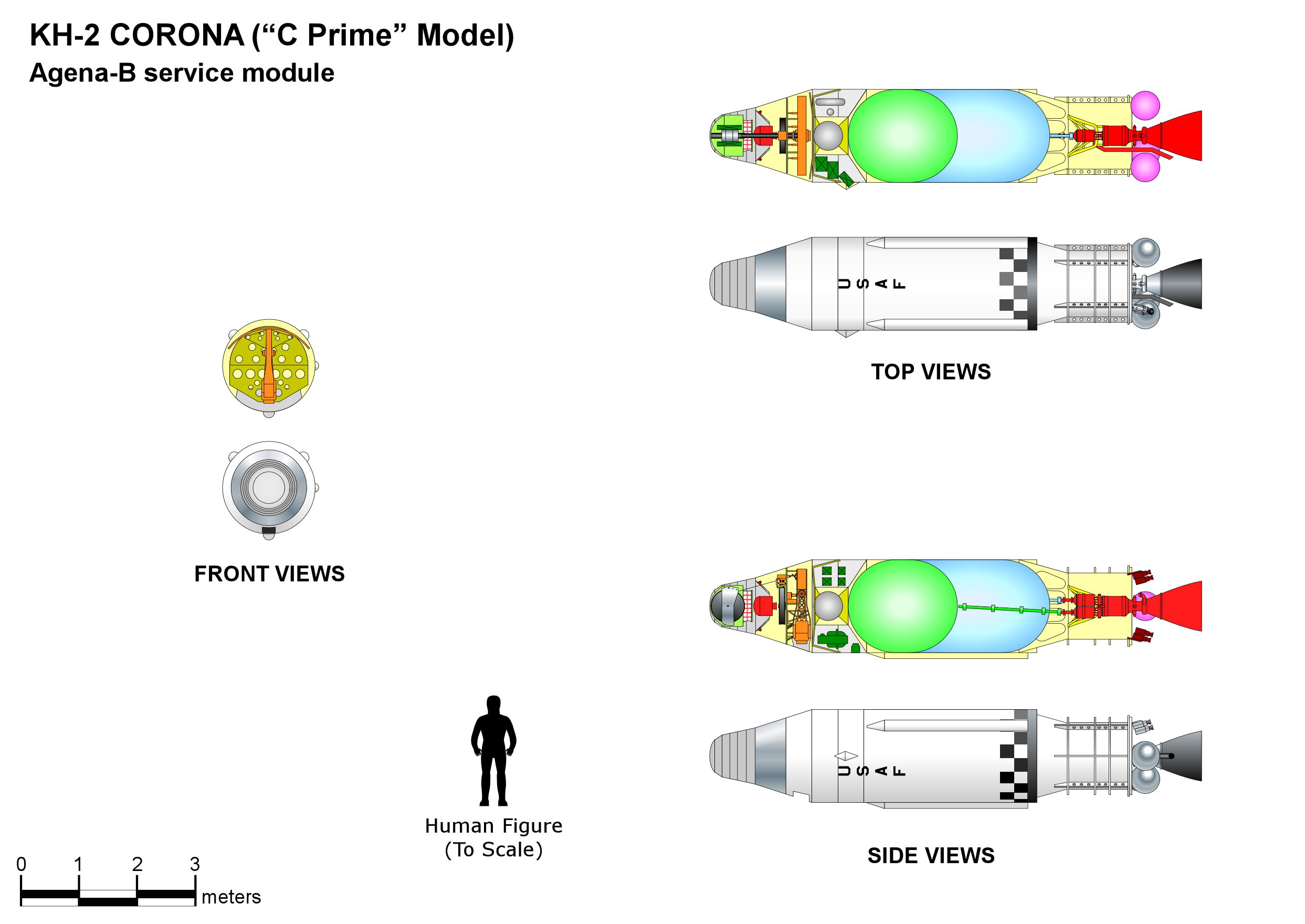
- Mission type: Optical reconnaissance
- Operator: US Air Force/NRO
- Harvard designation: 1961 Alpha Zeta 1
- COSPAR ID: 1961-030A
- SATCAT no.: 00201
- Mission duration: 1 day

Spacecraft properties
- Spacecraft type: Corona KH-2
- Bus: Agena-B
- Manufacturer: Lockheed
- Launch mass: 2,100 kilograms (4,600 lb)

Start of mission
- Launch date: 15 November 1961, 21:23 UTC
- Rocket: Thor DM-21 Agena-B 326
- Launch site: Vandenberg LC-75-3-4

End of mission
- Decay date: 3 December 1961

Orbital parameters
- Reference system: Geocentric
- Regime: Low Earth
- Perigee altitude: 233 kilometers (145 mi)
- Apogee altitude: 247 kilometers (153 mi)
- Inclination: 81.6 degrees
- Period: 89.3 minutes

Discoverer 35, also known as Corona 9028, was an American optical reconnaissance satellite which was launched in 1961. It was the last of ten Corona KH-2 satellites, based on the Agena-B.

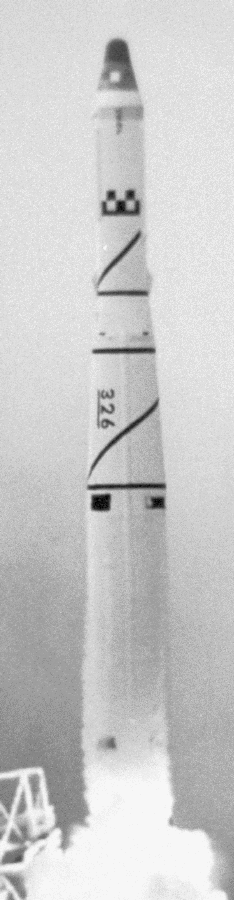
The launch of Discoverer 35

The launch of Discoverer 35 occurred at 21:23 UTC on 15 November 1961. A Thor DM-21 Agena-B rocket was used, flying from Launch Complex 75-3-4 at the Vandenberg Air Force Base. Upon successfully reaching orbit, it was assigned the Harvard designation 1961 Alpha Zeta 1.

Discoverer 35 was operated in a low Earth orbit, with a perigee of 233 kilometres (145 mi), an apogee of 247 kilometres (153 mi), 81.6 degrees of inclination, and a period of 89.3 minutes. The satellite had a mass of 2,100 kilograms (4,600 lb), and was equipped with a panoramic camera with a focal length of 61 centimetres (24 in), which had a maximum resolution of 7.6 metres (25 ft). Images were recorded onto 70-millimeter (2.8 in) film, and returned in a Satellite Recovery Vehicle just over a day after launch. The Satellite Recovery Vehicle used by Discoverer 35 was SRV-523. The SRV was successfully recovered. Apart from the presence of some emulsion on the images it returned, Discoverer 35 completed its mission successfully. It subsequently remained in orbit until it decayed on 3 December 1961.
