= Discoverer 28 =

Reconnaissance satellite

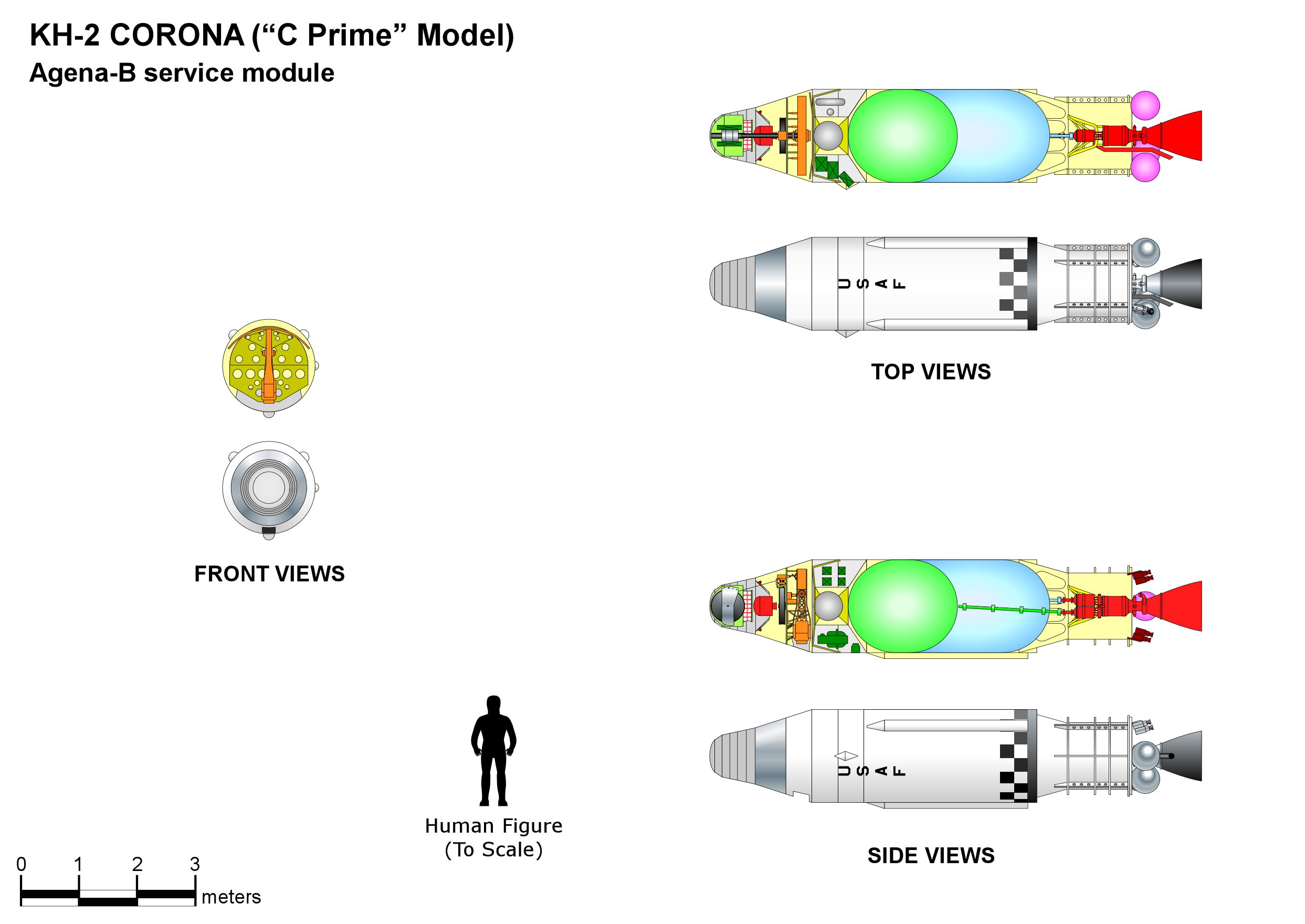
- Mission type: Optical reconnaissance
- Operator: US Air Force/NRO
- Mission duration: Failed to orbit

Spacecraft properties
- Spacecraft type: Corona KH-2
- Bus: Agena-B
- Manufacturer: Lockheed
- Launch mass: 1,150 kilograms (2,540 lb)

Start of mission
- Launch date: 4 August 1961, 00:01 UTC
- Rocket: Thor DM-21 Agena-B 309
- Launch site: Vandenberg LC-75-1-1

Orbital parameters
- Reference system: Geocentric
- Regime: Low Earth
- Epoch: Planned

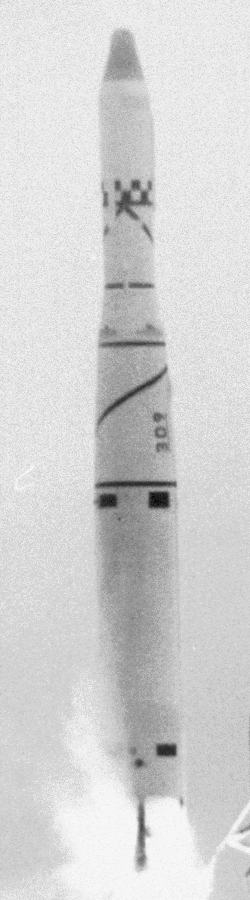
The launch of Discoverer 28

Discoverer 28, also known as Corona 9021, was an American optical reconnaissance satellite which was lost in a launch failure in 1961. It was the seventh of ten Corona KH-2 satellites, based on the Agena-B.

The launch of Discoverer 28 occurred at 00:01 UTC on 4 August 1961. A Thor DM-21 Agena-B rocket was used, flying from Launch Complex 75-1-1 at the Vandenberg Air Force Base. It failed to achieve orbit after the Agena's guidance and control system malfunctioned.

Discoverer 28 was to have operated in a low Earth orbit. The satellite had a mass of 1,150 kilograms (2,540 lb), and was equipped with a panoramic camera with a focal length of 61 centimetres (24 in), which had a maximum resolution of 7.6 metres (25 ft). Images were to have been recorded onto 70-millimeter (2.8 in) film, and returned in a Satellite Recovery Vehicle. The Satellite Recovery Vehicle carried by Discoverer 28 was SRV-512.
