= Discoverer 26 =

Reconnaissance satellite

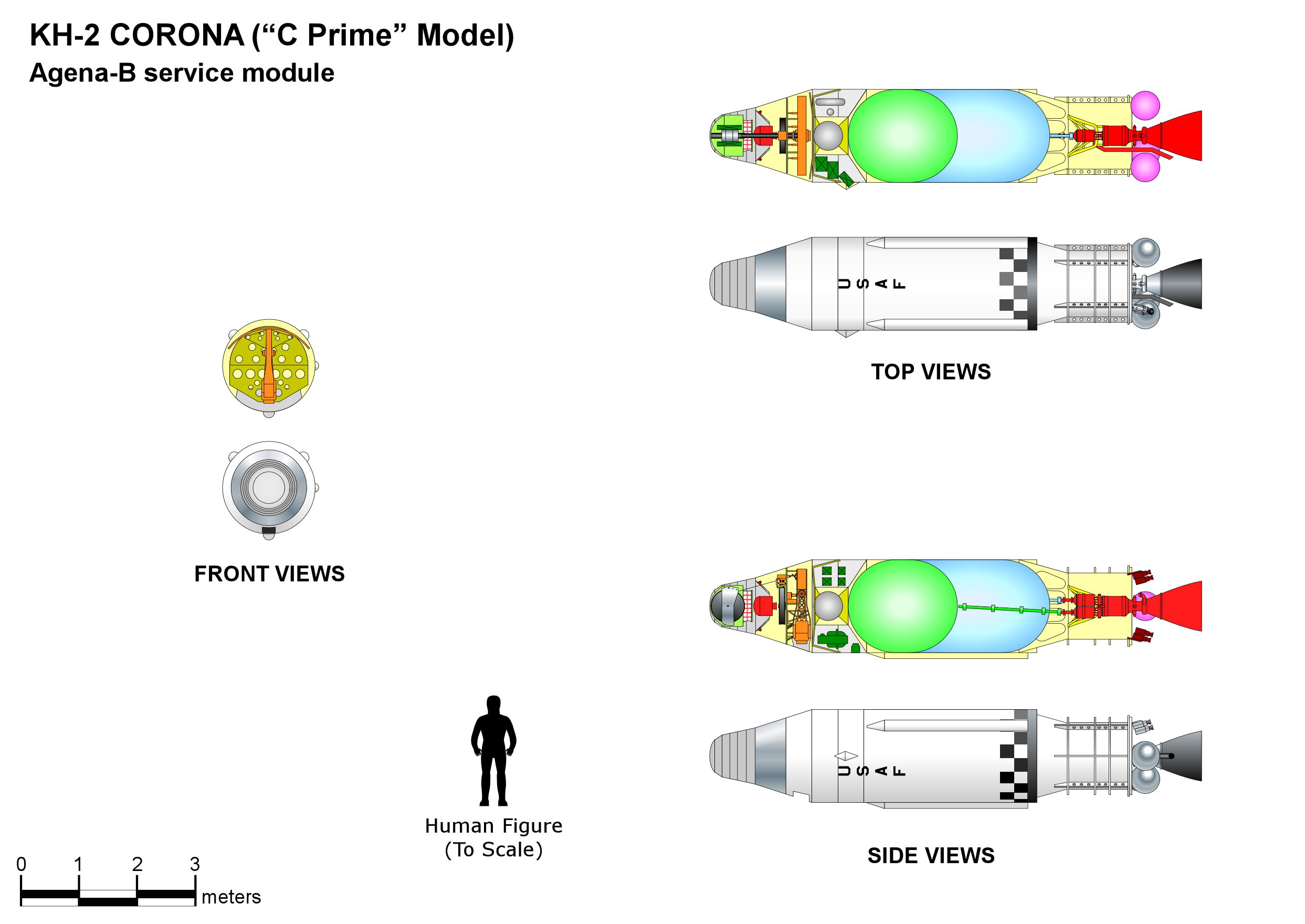
- Mission type: Optical reconnaissance
- Operator: US Air Force/NRO
- Harvard designation: 1961 Pi 1
- COSPAR ID: 1961-016A
- SATCAT no.: 00160
- Mission duration: 2 days

Spacecraft properties
- Spacecraft type: Corona KH-2
- Bus: Agena-B
- Manufacturer: Lockheed
- Launch mass: 1,150 kilograms (2,540 lb)

Start of mission
- Launch date: 7 July 1961, 23:29:48 UTC
- Rocket: Thor DM-21 Agena-B 308
- Launch site: Vandenberg LC-75-3-5

End of mission
- Decay date: 5 December 1961

Orbital parameters
- Reference system: Geocentric
- Regime: Low Earth
- Perigee altitude: 229 kilometers (142 mi)
- Apogee altitude: 713 kilometers (443 mi)
- Inclination: 82.9 degrees
- Period: 94 minutes

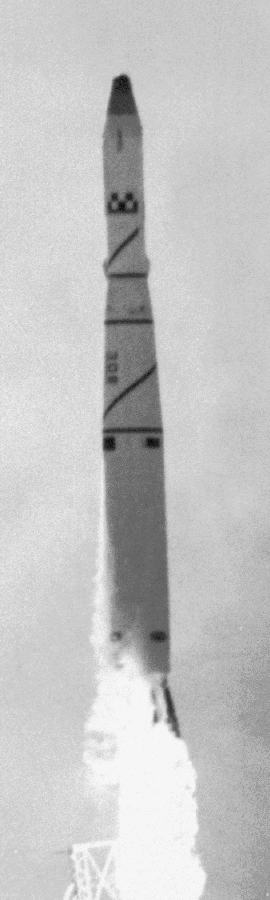
The launch of Discoverer 26

Discoverer 26, also known as Corona 9019, was an American optical reconnaissance satellite which was launched in 1961. It was the sixth of ten Corona KH-2 satellites, based on the Agena-B.

The launch of Discoverer 26 occurred at 23:29:48 UTC on 7 July 1961. A Thor DM-21 Agena-B rocket was used, flying from Launch Complex 75-3-5 at the Vandenberg Air Force Base. Upon successfully reaching orbit, it was assigned the Harvard designation 1961 Pi 1.

Discoverer 26 was operated in a low Earth orbit, with a perigee of 229 kilometres (142 mi), an apogee of 713 kilometres (443 mi), 82.9 degrees of inclination, and a period of 94 minutes. The satellite had a mass of 1,150 kilograms (2,540 lb), and was equipped with a panoramic camera with a focal length of 61 centimetres (24 in), which had a maximum resolution of 7.6 metres (25 ft). Images were recorded onto 70-millimeter (2.8 in) film, and returned in a Satellite Recovery Vehicle, which was deorbited two days after launch. The Satellite Recovery Vehicle used by Discoverer 26 was SRV-511. Once its images had been returned, Discoverer 26's mission was complete, and it remained in orbit until it decayed on 5 December 1961.
