= Discoverer 31 =

- Mission type: Optical reconnaissance
- Operator: US Air Force/NRO
- Harvard designation: 1961 Alpha Beta 1
- COSPAR ID: 1961-026A
- SATCAT no.: 00186
- Mission duration: 2 days

Spacecraft properties
- Spacecraft type: KH-3 Corona'''
- Bus: Agena-B
- Manufacturer: Lockheed
- Launch mass: 1,150 kilograms (2,540 lb)

Start of mission
- Launch date: 17 September 1961, 21:00 UTC
- Rocket: Thor DM-21 Agena-B 324
- Launch site: Vandenberg LC-75-1-1

End of mission
- Decay date: 26 October 1961

Orbital parameters
- Reference system: Geocentric
- Regime: Low Earth
- Perigee altitude: 233 kilometers (145 mi)
- Apogee altitude: 380 kilometers (240 mi)
- Inclination: 82.7 degrees
- Period: 90.7 minutes

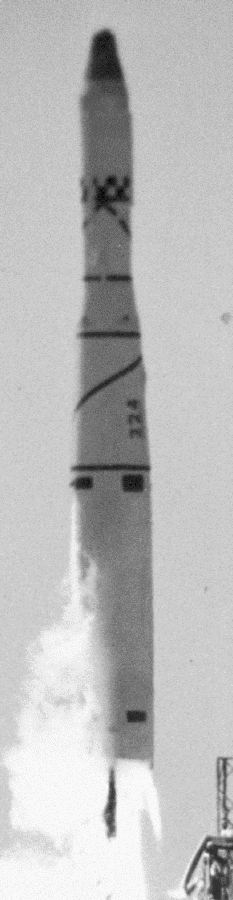
The launch of Discoverer 31

Discoverer 31, also known as Corona 9024, was an American optical reconnaissance satellite which was launched in 1961. It was a KH-3 Corona''' satellite, based on an Agena-B.

The launch of Discoverer 31 occurred at 21:00 UTC on 17 September 1961. A Thor DM-21 Agena-B rocket was used, flying from Launch Complex 75-1-1 at the Vandenberg Air Force Base. Upon successfully reaching orbit, it was assigned the Harvard designation 1961 Alpha Beta 1.

Discoverer 31 was operated in a low Earth orbit, with a perigee of 233 kilometres (145 mi), an apogee of 380 kilometres (240 mi), 82.7 degrees of inclination, and a period of 90.7 minutes. The satellite had a mass of 1,150 kilograms (2,540 lb), and was equipped with a panoramic camera with a focal length of 61 centimetres (24 in), which had a maximum resolution of 7.6 metres (25 ft). Images were recorded onto 70-millimeter (2.8 in) film, and were to have been returned in a Satellite Recovery Vehicle. The Satellite Recovery Vehicle carried aboard Discoverer 31 was SRV-552. During the spacecraft's thirty-third orbit, the attitude control and power systems malfunctioned, and as a result Discoverer 31 was unable to complete its mission or return images. It decayed from orbit on 26 October 1961.
