= Discoverer 32 =

- Mission type: Optical reconnaissance
- Operator: US Air Force/NRO
- Harvard designation: 1961 Alpha Gamma 1
- COSPAR ID: 1961-027A
- SATCAT no.: 00189
- Mission duration: 1 day

Spacecraft properties
- Spacecraft type: KH-3 Corona'''
- Bus: Agena-B
- Manufacturer: Lockheed
- Launch mass: 1,150 kilograms (2,540 lb)

Start of mission
- Launch date: 13 October 1961, 19:22 UTC
- Rocket: Thor DM-21 Agena-B 328
- Launch site: Vandenberg LC-75-3-4

End of mission
- Decay date: 13 November 1961

Orbital parameters
- Reference system: Geocentric
- Regime: Low Earth
- Perigee altitude: 233 kilometers (145 mi)
- Apogee altitude: 350 kilometers (220 mi)
- Inclination: 81.6 degrees
- Period: 90.3 minutes

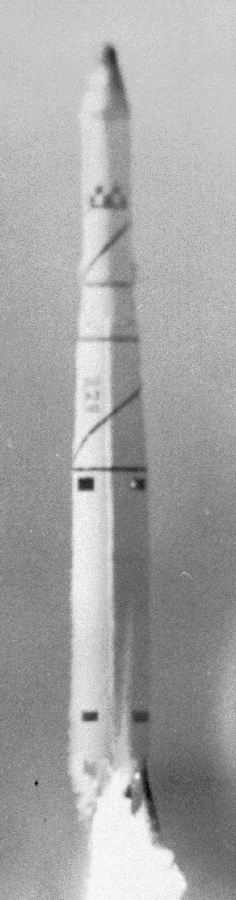
The launch of Discoverer 32

Discoverer 32, also known as Corona 9025, was an American optical reconnaissance satellite which was launched in 1961. It was a KH-3 Corona''' satellite, based on an Agena-B.

The launch of Discoverer 32 occurred at 19:22 UTC on 13 October 1961. A Thor DM-21 Agena-B rocket was used, flying from Launch Complex 75-3-4 at the Vandenberg Air Force Base. Upon successfully reaching orbit, it was assigned the Harvard designation 1961 Alpha Gamma 1.

Discoverer 32 was operated in a low Earth orbit, with a perigee of 233 kilometres (145 mi), an apogee of 350 kilometres (220 mi), 81.6 degrees of inclination, and a period of 90.3 minutes. The satellite had a mass of 1,150 kilograms (2,540 lb), and was equipped with a panoramic camera with a focal length of 61 centimetres (24 in), which had a maximum resolution of 7.6 metres (25 ft). Images were recorded onto 70-millimeter (2.8 in) film, and returned in a Satellite Recovery Vehicle, which was deorbited one day after launch. The Satellite Recovery Vehicle used by Discoverer 32 was SRV-555. Following the return of its images, Discoverer 32 remained in orbit until it decayed on 13 November 1961. Most of the images it produced were found to have been out of focus.
