= Discoverer 33 =

Reconnaissance satellite

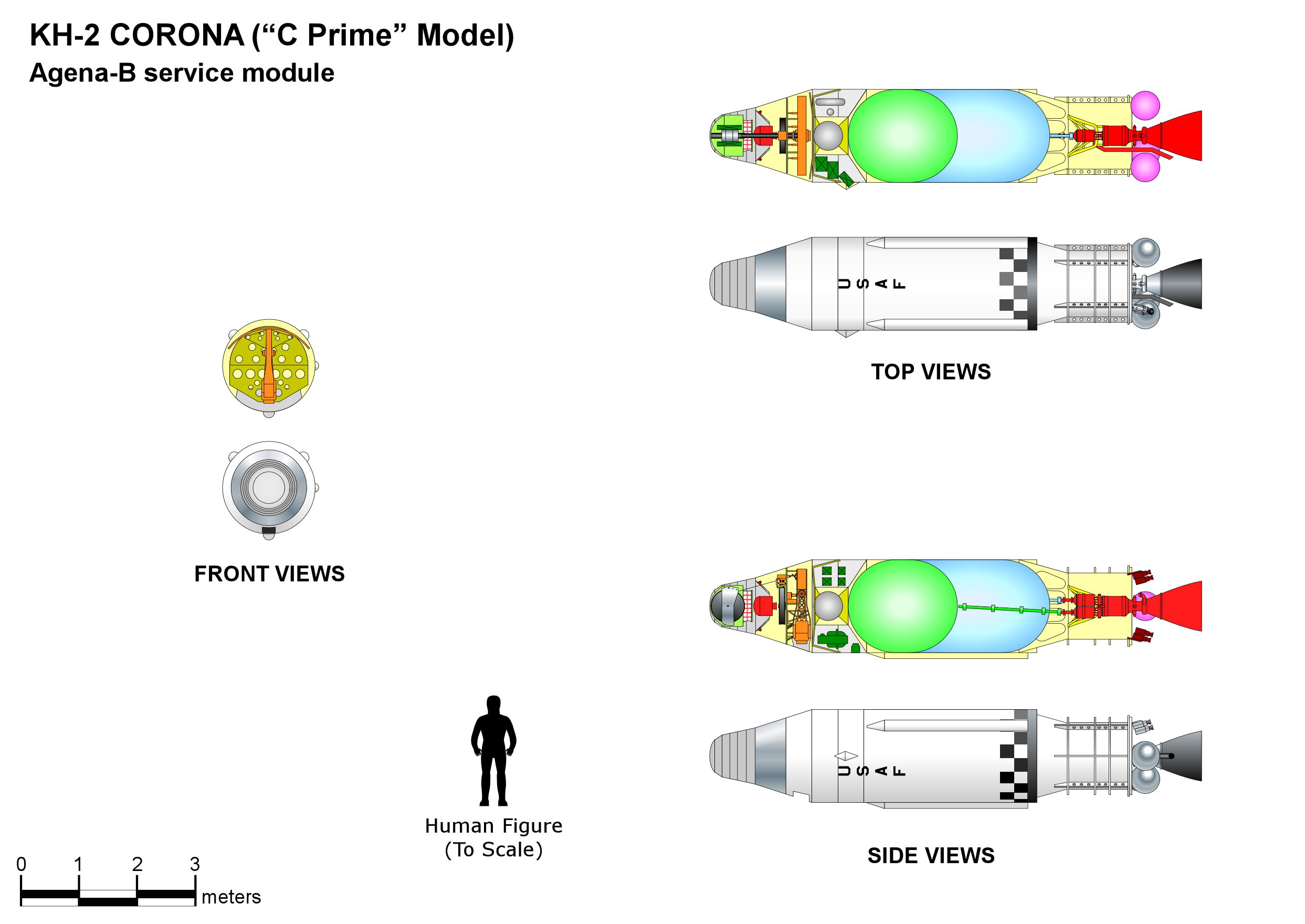
- Mission type: Optical reconnaissance
- Operator: US Air Force/NRO
- Mission duration: Failed to orbit

Spacecraft properties
- Spacecraft type: Corona KH-2
- Bus: Agena-B
- Manufacturer: Lockheed
- Launch mass: 1,150 kilograms (2,540 lb)

Start of mission
- Launch date: 23 October 1961, 19:23 UTC
- Rocket: Thor DM-21 Agena-B 329
- Launch site: Vandenberg LC-75-3-5

Orbital parameters
- Reference system: Geocentric
- Regime: Low Earth
- Epoch: Planned

Discoverer 33, also known as Corona 9026, was an American optical reconnaissance satellite which was lost in a launch failure in 1961. It was the eighth of ten Corona KH-2 satellites, based on the Agena-B.

The launch of Discoverer 33 occurred at 19:23 UTC on 23 October 1961. A Thor DM-21 Agena-B rocket was used, flying from Launch Complex 75-3-5 at the Vandenberg Air Force Base. The launch ended in failure after the Agena suffered a hydraulics system malfunction that led to premature main engine shutdown.

Discoverer 33 was intended to have operated in a low Earth orbit. It had a mass of 1,150 kilograms (2,540 lb), and was equipped with a panoramic camera with a focal length of 61 centimetres (24 in), which had a maximum resolution of 7.6 metres (25 ft). It would have recorded images onto 70-millimeter (2.8 in) film, and returned this in a Satellite Recovery Vehicle at the end of its mission. The Satellite Recovery Vehicle carried by Discoverer 33 was SRV-553.
