= Discoverer 29 =

American optical reconnaissance satellite

- Mission type: Optical reconnaissance
- Operator: US Air Force/NRO
- Harvard designation: 1961 Psi 1
- COSPAR ID: 1961-023A
- SATCAT no.: 00181
- Mission duration: 2 days

Spacecraft properties
- Spacecraft type: KH-3 Corona'''
- Bus: Agena-B
- Manufacturer: Lockheed
- Launch mass: 1,150 kilograms (2,540 lb)

Start of mission
- Launch date: 30 August 1961, 20:00 UTC
- Rocket: Thor DM-21 Agena-B 323
- Launch site: Vandenberg LC-75-3-4

End of mission
- Decay date: 9 September 1961

Orbital parameters
- Reference system: Geocentric
- Regime: Low Earth
- Perigee altitude: 138 kilometers (86 mi)
- Apogee altitude: 511 kilometers (318 mi)
- Inclination: 82 degrees
- Period: 91 minutes

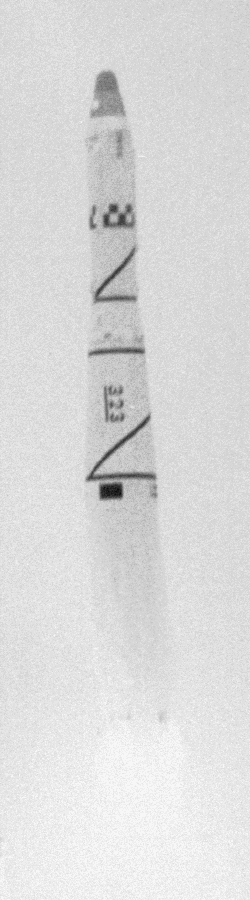
The launch of Discoverer 29

Discoverer 29, also known as Corona 9023, was an American optical reconnaissance satellite which was launched in 1961. It was the first KH-3 Corona satellite, which was based on an Agena-B rocket.

The launch of Discoverer 29 occurred at 20:00 UTC on 30 August 1961. A Thor DM-21 Agena-B rocket was used, flying from Launch Complex 75-3-4 at the Vandenberg Air Force Base. Upon successfully reaching orbit, it was assigned the Harvard designation 1961 Psi 1.

Discoverer 29 was operated in a low Earth orbit, with a perigee of 138 kilometres (86 mi), an apogee of 511 kilometres (318 mi), 82 degrees of inclination, and a period of 91 minutes. The satellite had a mass of 1,150 kilograms (2,540 lb), and was equipped with a panoramic camera with a focal length of 61 centimetres (24 in), which had a maximum resolution of 7.6 metres (25 ft). Images were recorded onto 70-millimeter (2.8 in) film, and returned in a Satellite Recovery Vehicle two days after launch, but all of the images returned were found to be out of focus. The Satellite Recovery Vehicle used by Discoverer 29 was SRV-554. Once its images had been returned, Discoverer 29 remained in orbit until it decayed on 9 September 1961.
