= List of Thor-Agena launches =

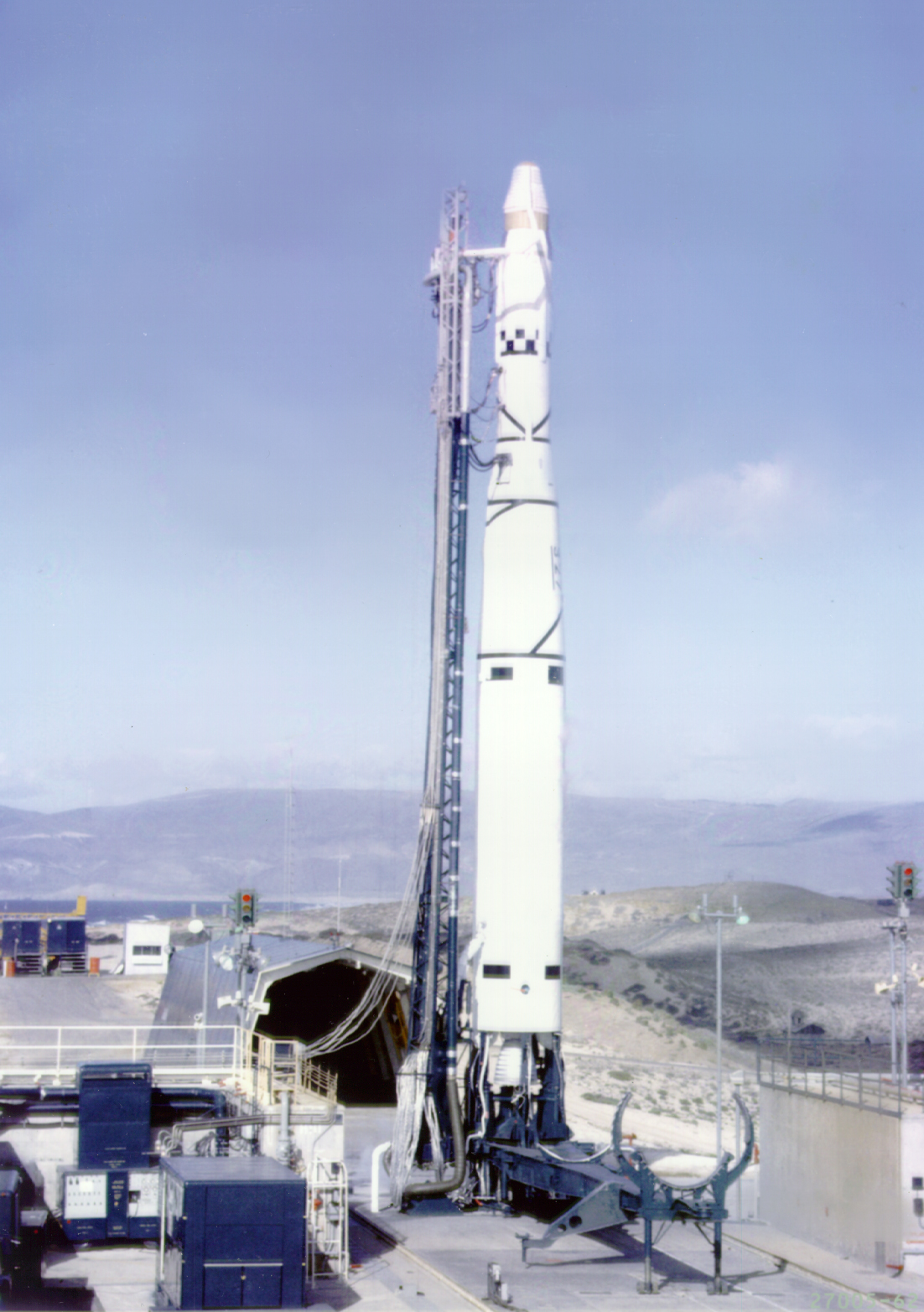
A Thor-Agena launch vehicle, ready to launch the Discoverer 37 (KH-3) spacecraft, on 13 January 1962

Thor DM-18 Agena or just Thor-Agena was a series of orbital launch vehicles. The launch vehicles used the Douglas-built Thor first stage and the Lockheed-built Agena second stages. They are thus cousins of the more-famous Thor-Delta, which founded the Delta launch vehicle family. The first attempted launch of a Thor-Agena was on 28 February 1959. The first successful launch was on 13 April 1959, launching Discoverer 2. It was the first two-stage rocket to place a satellite into orbit.

== Launch statistics ==
=== Launch outcome ===
- Success
- Failure
- Partial failure

=== Orbit ===
- LEO
- MEO

=== Launchpad ===
- VAFB LC-75-3-4
- VAFB LC-75-3-5
- VAFB LC-75-1-1

=== Function ===
- Reconnaissance
- Technology
- Amateur radio
- ELINT
- Ionospheric

== Launch history ==
The data in this table comes from
| Date/Time (UTC) | Rocket | S/N | Launch site | Payload | Function | Orbit | Outcome | Remarks |
|---|---|---|---|---|---|---|---|---|
| 28 February 1959; 21:49:16 | Thor DM-18 Agena-A | Thor 163; Agena 1022 | VAFB, LC-75-3-4 | Discoverer 1 | Reconnaissance | LEO | Failure | Maiden flight of Thor-Agena A. Agena telemetry lost at T+730 seconds. Fate of the payload unknown, but generally presumed to have impacted somewhere in Antarctica. |
| 13 April 1959; 21:18:39 | Thor DM-18 Agena-A | Thor 170; Agena 1018 | VAFB LC-75-3-4 | Discoverer 2 | Reconnaissance | LEO | Success | |
| 1959-06-03; 20:09:20 | Thor DM-18 Agena-A | Thor 174; Agena 1020 | VAFB LC-75-3-4 | Discoverer 3 | Reconnaissance | LEO | Failure | Agena attitude control malfunction pointed the stage in the wrong direction, sending it into the Pacific Ocean rather than orbit. |
| 1959-06-25; 22:47:45 | Thor DM-18 Agena-A | Thor 179; Agena 1023 | VAFB LC-75-3-5 | Discoverer 4 | Reconnaissance | LEO | Failure | Agena developed insufficient thrust to attain orbital velocity. |
| 1959-08-13; 19:00:08 | Thor DM-18 Agena-A | Thor 192; Agena 1029 | VAFB LC-75-3-4 | Discoverer 5 | Reconnaissance | LEO | Success | |
| 1959-08-19; 19:24:44 | Thor DM-18 Agena-A | Thor 200; Agena 1028 | VAFB LC-75-3-5 | Discoverer 6 | Reconnaissance | LEO | Success | |
| 1959-11-07; 20:28:41 | Thor DM-18 Agena-A | Thor 206; Agena 1051 | VAFB LC-75-3-4 | Discoverer 7 | Reconnaissance | LEO | Success | |
| 1959-11-20; 19:25:24 | Thor DM-18 Agena-A | Thor 212; Agena 1050 | VAFB LC-75-3-5 | Discoverer 8 | Reconnaissance | LEO | Failure | Orbit too eccentric for use of return capsule |
| 1960-02-04; 18:51:45 | Thor DM-18 Agena-A | Thor 218; Agena 1052 | VAFB LC-75-3-4 | Discoverer 9 | Reconnaissance | LEO | Failure | Premature Thor cutoff. Agena could not attain orbital velocity. |
| 1960-02-19; 20:15:14 | Thor DM-18 Agena-A | Thor 223; Agena 1054 | VAFB LC-75-3-5 | Discoverer 10 | Reconnaissance | LEO | Failure | Thor flight control malfunction. RSO T+52 seconds. |
| 1960-04-15; 20:30:37 | Thor DM-18 Agena-A | Thor 234; Agena 1055 | VAFB LC-75-3-5 | Discoverer 11 | Reconnaissance | LEO | Success | |
| 1960-06-29; 22:00:44 | Thor DM-18 Agena-A | Thor 160; Agena 1053 | VAFB LC-75-3-4 | Discoverer 12 | Reconnaissance | LEO | Failure | Agena attitude control malfunction. |
| 1960-08-10; 20:37:54 | Thor DM-18 Agena-A | Thor 231; Agena 1057 | VAFB LC-75-3-5 | Discoverer 13 | Reconnaissance | LEO | Success | First successful recovery of a manmade object from orbit. |
| 1960-08-18; 19:57:08 | Thor DM-18 Agena-A | Thor 237; Agena 1056 | VAFB, LC-75-3-4 | Discoverer 14 | Reconnaissance | LEO | Success | |
| 1960-09-13; 22:14 | Thor DM-18 Agena-A | Thor 246; Agena 1058 | VAFB, LC-75-3-5 | Discoverer 15 | Reconnaissance | LEO | Success | |
| 1960-10-26; 20:26 | Thor DM-21 Agena-B | Thor 253; Agena 1061 | VAFB, LC-75-3-4 | Discoverer 16 | Reconnaissance | LEO | Failure | Maiden flight of Thor-Agena B. Agena staging failed. Vehicle fell into the Pacific Ocean. |
| 1960-11-12; 20:43 | Thor DM-21 Agena-B | Thor 297; Agena 1062 | VAFB, LC-75-3-5 | Discoverer 17 | Reconnaissance | LEO | Success | |
| 1960-12-07; 20:20:58 | Thor DM-21 Agena-B | Thor 296; Agena 1103 | VAFB, LC-75-3-4 | Discoverer 18 | Reconnaissance | LEO | Success | |
| 1960-12-20; 20:32 | Thor DM-21 Agena-B | Thor 258; Agena 1101 | VAFB, LC-75-3-5 | Discoverer 19 | Technology | LEO | Success | |
| 1961-02-17; 20:25 | Thor DM-21 Agena-B | Thor 298 | VAFB, LC-75-3-4 | Discoverer 20 | Reconnaissance | LEO | Success | |
| 1961-02-18; 22:58 | Thor DM-21 Agena-B | Thor 261; Agena 1102 | VAFB, LC-75-3-5 | Discoverer 21 | Technology | LEO | Success | |
| 1961-03-30; 20:34:43 | Thor DM-21 Agena-B | Thor 300; Agena 1105 | VAFB, LC-75-3-4 | Discoverer 22 | Reconnaissance | LEO | Failure | Agena control failure. |
| 1961-04-08; 19:21 | Thor DM-21 Agena-B | Thor 307; Agena 1106 | VAFB, LC-75-3-5 | Discoverer 23 | Reconnaissance | LEO | Success | |
| 1961-06-08; 21:16 | Thor DM-21 Agena-B | Thor 302; Agena 1108 | VAFB, LC-75-3-4 | Discoverer 24 | Reconnaissance | LEO | Failure | Agena power failure |
| 1961-06-16; 23:02 | Thor DM-21 Agena-B | Thor 303; Agena 1107 | VAFB, LC-75-1-1 | Discoverer 25 | Reconnaissance | LEO | Success | |
| 1961-07-07; 23:29:48 | Thor DM-21 Agena-B | Thor 308; Agena 1109 | VAFB, LC-75-3-5 | Discoverer 26 | Reconnaissance | LEO | Success | |
| 1961-07-21; 22:35 | Thor DM-21 Agena-B | Thor 322; Agena 1110 | VAFB, LC-75-3-4 | Discoverer 27 | Reconnaissance | LEO | Failure | Open circuit in guidance computer led to loss of control and vehicle breakup at T+60 seconds. |
| 1961-08-04; 00:01 | Thor DM-21 Agena-B | Thor 309; Agena 1111 | VAFB, LC-75-1-1 | Discoverer 28 | Reconnaissance | LEO | Failure | Agena control system malfunctioned |
| 1961-08-30; 20:00 | Thor DM-21 Agena-B | Thor 323; Agena 1112 | VAFB, LC-75-3-4 | Discoverer 29 | Reconnaissance | LEO | Success | |
| 1961-09-12; 19:59 | Thor DM-21 Agena-B | Thor 310; Agena 1113 | VAFB, LC-75-3-5 | Discoverer 30 | Reconnaissance | LEO | Success | |
| 1961-09-17; 21:00 | Thor DM-21 Agena-B | Thor 324; Agena 1114 | VAFB, LC-75-1-1 | Discoverer 31 | Reconnaissance | LEO | Success | |
| 1961-10-13; 19:22 | Thor DM-21 Agena-B | Thor 328; Agena 1115 | VAFB, LC-75-3-4 | Discoverer 32 | Reconnaissance | LEO | Success | 100th Thor launch |
| 1961-10-23; 19:23 | Thor DM-21 Agena-B | Thor 329; Agena 1116 | VAFB LC-75-3-5 | Discoverer 33 | Reconnaissance | LEO | Failure | Agena hydraulics failure |
| 1961-11-05; 20:00 | Thor DM-21 Agena-B | Thor 330; Agena 1117 | VAFB LC-75-1-1 | Discoverer 34 | Reconnaissance | LEO | Failure | Incorrect guidance program left the satellite in a useless orbit. |
| 1961-11-15; 21:23 | Thor DM-21 Agena-B | Thor 326; Agena 1118 | VAFB LC-75-3-4 | Discoverer 35 | Reconnaissance | LEO | Success | |
| 1961-12-12; 20:40 | Thor DM-21 Agena-B | Thor 325; Agena 1119 | VAFB LC-75-3-4 | Discoverer 36; Oscar 1 | Reconnaissance; Amateur radio | LEO | Success | |
| 1962-01-13; 21:41 | Thor DM-21 Agena-B | Thor 327; Agena 1120 | VAFB LC-75-3-4 | Discoverer 37 | Reconnaissance | LEO | Failure | Agena restart burn failed. |
| 1962-02-21; 18:44 | Thor DM-21 Agena-B | Thor 332; Agena 2301 | VAFB LC-75-3-5 | FTV 2301 | ELINT | LEO | Partial failure | Upper stage failed to restart for circularization burn |
| 1962-02-27; 19:39 | Thor DM-21 Agena-B | Thor 241; Agena 1123 | VAFB LC-75-3-4 | Discoverer 38 | Reconnaissance | LEO | Success | |
| 1962-04-18; 00:54 | Thor DM-21 Agena-B | Thor 331; Agena 1124 | VAFB LC-75-3-5 | Discoverer 39 | Reconnaissance | LEO | Success | |
| 1962-04-29; 00:30:12 | Thor DM-21 Agena-B | Thor 333; Agena 1125 | VAFB LC-75-3-4 | FTV 1125 | Reconnaissance | LEO | Success | |
| 1962-05-15; 19:36 | Thor DM-21 Agena-B | Thor 334; Agena 1126 | VAFB LC-75-3-5 | FTV 1126 | Reconnaissance | LEO | Success | |
| 1962-05-30; 01:00:04 | Thor DM-21 Agena-B | Thor 336; Agena 1128 | VAFB LC-75-1-1 | FTV 1128 | Reconnaissance | LEO | Success | |
| 1962-06-02; 00:31 | Thor DM-21 Agena-B | Thor 335; Agena 1127 | VAFB LC-75-3-4 | FTV 1127; Oscar 2 | Reconnaissance; Amateur radio | LEO | Success | |
| 1962-06-18; 20:20 | Thor DM-21 Agena-B | Thor 343; Agena 2312 | VAFB, LC-75-3-5 | FTV 2312 | ELINT | LEO | Success | |
| 1962-06-23; 00:30 | Thor DM-21 Agena-B | Thor 339; Agena 1129 | VAFB LC-75-3-4 | FTV 1129 | Reconnaissance | LEO | Success | |
| 1962-06-28; 01:09 | Thor DM-21 Agena-D | Thor 340; Agena 1151 | VAFB LC-75-1-1 | FTV 1151 | Reconnaissance | LEO | Success | |
| 1962-07-21; 00:56 | Thor DM-21 Agena-B | Thor 342; Agena 1130 | VAFB LC-75-3-5 | FTV 1130 | Reconnaissance | LEO | Success | |
| 1962-07-28; 00:30 | Thor DM-21 Agena-B | Thor 347; Agena 1131 | VAFB LC-75-3-4 | FTV 1131 | Reconnaissance | LEO | Success | |
| 1962-08-02; 00:17 | Thor DM-21 Agena-D | Thor 344; Agena 1152 | VAFB LC-75-1-1 | FTV 1152 | Reconnaissance | LEO | Success | |
| 1962-08-29; 01:00 | Thor DM-21 Agena-D | Thor 349; Agena 1153 | VAFB LC-75-1-2 | FTV 1153 | Reconnaissance | LEO | Success | |
| 1962-09-01; 20:39 | Thor DM-21 Agena-B | Thor 348; Agena 1132 | VAFB LC-75-3-5 | FTV 1132 | Reconnaissance | LEO | Success | |
| 1962-09-17; 23:46 | Thor DM-21 Agena-B | Thor 350; Agena 1133 | VAFB LC-75-3-4 | FTV 1133; ERS-2 | Reconnaissance; Technology | LEO | Success | |
| 1962-09-29; 06:05 | Thor DM-21 Agena-B | Thor 341; TA-1 | VAFB LC-75-1-1 | Alouette 1 TAVE | Ionospheric research satellite Technology | LEO | Success | |
| 1962-09-29; 23:34:50 | Thor DM-21 Agena-D | Thor 351; Agena 1154 | VAFB LC-75-1-2 | FTV 1154 | Reconnaissance | LEO | Success | |
| 1962-10-09; 18:35 | Thor DM-21 Agena-B | Thor 352; Agena 1134 | VAFB LC-75-3-4 | FTV 1134 | Reconnaissance | LEO | Success | |
| 1962-10-26; 16:14 | Thor DM-21 Agena-D | Thor 353; Agena 1401 | VAFB LC-75-1-2 | STARAD | Radiation | MEO | Success | |
| 1962-11-05; 22:04 | Thor DM-21 Agena-B | Thor 356; Agena 1136 | VAFB LC-75-3-4 | FTV 1136 | Reconnaissance | LEO | Success | |
| 1962-11-24; 22:01 | Thor DM-21 Agena-B | Thor 367; Agena 1135 | VAFB LC-75-3-4 | FTV 1135 | Reconnaissance | LEO | Success | |
| 1962-12-04; 21:30 | Thor DM-21 Agena-D | Thor 361; Agena 1155 | VAFB LC-75-1-2 | FTV 1155 | Reconnaissance | LEO | Success | |
| 1962-12-13; 04:07 | Thor DM-21 Agena-D | Thor 365 | VAFB LC-75-1-1 | NRL PL120; Injun 3 NRL PL121; SURCAL 2 Calsphere 1 | ELINT; Ionospheric; Calibration | MEO | Success | |
| 1962-12-14; 21:26:07 | Thor DM-21 Agena-D | Thor 368; Agena 1156 | VAFB LC-75-3-5 | FTV 1156 | Reconnaissance | LEO | Success | |
| 1963-01-07; 21:09:49 | Thor DM-21 Agena-D | Thor 369; Agena 1157 | VAFB LC-75-1-1 | OPS 0048 | Reconnaissance | LEO | Success | |
| 1963-01-16; 21:59 | Thor DM-21 Agena-B | Thor 363; Agena 2313 | VAFB LC-75-3-5 | OPS 0180 | ELINT | LEO | Success | |
| 1963-04-01; 23:01 | Thor DM-21 Agena-D | Thor 376; Agena 1160 | VAFB LC-75-3-5 | OPS 0720 | Reconnaissance | LEO | Success | |
| 1963-04-26; 20:13 | Thor DM-21 Agena-D | Thor 372; Agena 1411 | VAFB LC-75-1-1 | OPS 1008 | Reconnaissance | LEO | Failure | Attitude sensor alignment error results in no Agena orbit. |
| 1963-06-15; 14:29 | Thor DM-21 Agena-D | Thor 378; Agena 2353 | VAFB LC-75-1-1 | FTV 1292; Solrad 6A; LOFTI 2B; Surcal 3 Radose 112 | ELINT; Radiation; Ionospheric; Calibration | LEO | Success | |
| 1963-07-19; 00:00:10 | Thor DM-21 Agena-D | Thor 388; Agena 1412 | VAFB LC-75-1-1 | OPS 1266 | Reconnaissance | LEO | Success | |
| 1965-03-09; 18:29 | Thor DM-21 Agena-D | Thor 419; Agena 2701 | VAFB SLC-2W | SECOR 3 / Dodecapole 1 / Poppy 4 / Solrad 7B / GGSE 2 / GGSE 3 / Surcal 4 / Oscar 3 | Geodesic research / Radar calibration / ELINT / ELINT / Technological test / Technological test / Technological test / Amateur radio satellite | LEO | Success | |
| 1965-09-02; 20:00 | Thor DM-21 Agena-D | Thor 401; Agena 1602 | VAFB LC-75-3-5 | MPRV | Upper atmosphere and space experiments | planned: MEO | Failure | High winds caused the vehicle to drift off course. RSO T+43 seconds. Debris fell on a trailer park. |
| 1965-11-29; 04:48 | Thor DM-21 Agena-B | Thor 453; Agena 6102 | VAFB LC-75-1-1 | Alouette 2 / Explorer 31 (DME) | Ionospheric research satellite / Ionospheric research satellite | MEO | Success | |
| 1967-05-31; 09:30 | Thor DM-21 Agena-D | Thor 443; Agena 2704 | VAFB SLC-2W | Timation 1 / GGSE 4 / GGSE 5 / Poppy 5 / Calsphere 3 / Calsphere 4 / Surcal 152 / Surcal 153 / Surcal 150B | Experimental navigation satellite / Technological research satellite / ELINT / Technological research satellites (x5) | LEO | Success | Final flight of the original Thor-Agena series. |
