= 1961 in spaceflight (January–June) =

This is a list of spaceflights launched between January and June 1961. For launches between July and December, see 1961 in spaceflight (July–December). For an overview of the whole year, see 1961 in spaceflight.

== Orbital launches ==
- ← Jan
- Feb
- Mar
- Apr
- May
- Jun
- Jul
- Aug
- Sep
- Oct
- Nov
- Dec →

Date and time (UTC)	Rocket	Flight number	Launch site		LSP	
Date and time (UTC)	Payload (⚀ = CubeSat)	Operator	Orbit	Function	Decay (UTC)	Outcome
Date and time (UTC)	Remarks					
=== January ===
31 January; 20:21:19	(United States) Atlas LV-3A Agena-A		(United States) Vandenberg SLC-3W		(United States) US Air Force	
31 January; 20:21:19	(United States) Samos E-1 2 (Samos 2)	US Air Force	Low Earth	Optical imaging	21 October 1973	Successful
31 January; 20:21:19	(United States) Samos F-1 2	US Air Force	Low Earth	Optical imaging	21 October 1973	Successful
31 January; 20:21:19	Electro-optical satellite.					
← Jan; Feb; Mar; Apr; May; Jun; Jul; Aug; Sep; Oct; Nov; Dec →; === February ===
4 February; 01:18:03	(Soviet Union) Molniya		(Soviet Union) Baikonur Site 1/5		(Soviet Union) RVSN	
4 February; 01:18:03	(Soviet Union) Tyazhely Sputnik (Venera-1VA №1/Sputnik 7)	RVSN	Intended: Heliocentric; Achieved: Low Earth	Venus flyby	26 February	Launch failure
4 February; 01:18:03	First Probe built to fly over Venus. The Block-I third stage failed to ignite.					
12 February; 00:43:46	(Soviet Union) Molniya		(Soviet Union) Baikonur Site 1/5		(Soviet Union) RVSN	
12 February; 00:43:46	(Soviet Union) Venera 1 (Venera-1VA №2/Sputnik 8)	RVSN	Heliocentric	Venus flyby	In orbit	Spacecraft failure
12 February; 00:43:46	First probe to fly past Venus, contact lost before flyby.					
16 February; 13:05	(United States) Scout X-1		(United States) Wallops Island LA-3		(United States) NASA	
16 February; 13:05	(United States) Explorer 9 (S-56A)	NASA	Medium Earth	Air density	9 April 1964	Successful
17 February; 20:25	(United States) Thor DM-21 Agena-B		(United States) Vandenberg LC-75-3-4		(United States) US Air Force	
17 February; 20:25	(United States) Discoverer 20 (KH-5 1/9014A)	US Air Force	Low Earth	Optical imaging	28 July 1962	Successful
17 February; 20:25	(United States) SRV 520	US Air Force	Low Earth	Film return	31 October	Spacecraft failure
17 February; 20:25	Film recovery failed.					
18 February; 22:58	(United States) Thor DM-21 Agena-B		(United States) Vandenberg LC-75-3-5		(United States) US Air Force	
18 February; 22:58	(United States) Discoverer 21 (MIDAS RM-2)	US Air Force	Low Earth	Technology; Missile defence	20 April 1962	Successful
22 February; 20:25	(United States) Thor DM-21 Ablestar		(United States) Cape Canaveral LC-17B		(United States) US Air Force	
22 February; 20:25	(United States) Transit 3B	US Navy	Low Earth	Navigation; Technology	30 March	Partial launch failure
22 February; 20:25	(United States) LOFTI-1	NRL	Low Earth	Technology; Ionospheric	30 March	Partial launch failure
22 February; 20:25	Spacecraft failed to separate from upper stage, some data still returned.					
25 February; 00:13:16	(United States) Juno II		(United States) Cape Canaveral LC-26B		(United States) ABMA	
25 February; 00:13:16	(United States) S-45	NASA	Intended: Highly elliptical	Ionospheric	25 February	Launch failure
25 February; 00:13:16	Third stage failed to ignite.					
← Jan; Feb; Mar; Apr; May; Jun; Jul; Aug; Sep; Oct; Nov; Dec →; === March ===
9 March; 06:29:00	(Soviet Union) Vostok-K		(Soviet Union) Baikonur Site 1/5		(Soviet Union) RVSN	
9 March; 06:29:00	(Soviet Union) Korabl-Sputnik 4 (Vostok-3KA №1/Sputnik 9)	RVSN	Low Earth	Test flight	08:09:54	Successful
9 March; 06:29:00	First launch of improved Vostok-3KA spacecraft, same design that would carry the first human to space. Carried a dog named Chernushka and a mannequin.					
25 March; 05:54:00	(Soviet Union) Vostok-K		(Soviet Union) Baikonur Site 1/5		(Soviet Union) RVSN	
25 March; 05:54:00	(Soviet Union) Korabl-Sputnik 5 (Vostok-3KA №2/Sputnik 10)	RVSN	Low Earth	Test flight	07:40	Successful
25 March; 05:54:00	Carried a dog named Zvezdochka and a mannequin.					
25 March; 15:17:04	(United States) Thor DM-19 Delta		(United States) Cape Canaveral LC-17A		(United States) US Air Force	
25 March; 15:17:04	(United States) Explorer 10 (P-14)	NASA	Highly elliptical	Magnetospheric; Plasma research	In orbit	Successful
25 March; 15:17:04	Successfully completed operations fifty-two hours after launch.					
30 March; 20:34:43	(United States) Thor DM-21 Agena-B		(United States) Vandenberg LC-75-3-4		(United States) US Air Force	
30 March; 20:34:43	(United States) Discoverer 22 (KH-2 4/9015)	US Air Force	Intended: Low Earth	Optical imaging	30 March	Launch failure
30 March; 20:34:43	(United States) SRV 509	US Air Force	Intended: Low Earth	Film return	30 March	Launch failure
30 March; 20:34:43	Second stage attitude control system failure.					
← Jan; Feb; Mar; Apr; May; Jun; Jul; Aug; Sep; Oct; Nov; Dec →; === April ===
8 April; 19:21:08	(United States) Thor DM-21 Agena-B		(United States) Vandenberg SLC-1E		(United States) US Air Force	
8 April; 19:21:08	(United States) Discoverer 23 (KH-5 2/9016A)	US Air Force	Low Earth	Optical imaging	16 April 1962	Successful
8 April; 19:21:08	(United States) SRV 521	US Air Force	Low Earth	Film return	23 May 1962	Spacecraft failure
8 April; 19:21:08	SRV raised orbit during deorbit burn.					
12 April; 06:07:00	(Soviet Union) Vostok-K		(Soviet Union) Baikonur Site 1/5		(Soviet Union) RVSN	
12 April; 06:07:00	(Soviet Union) Vostok 1	RVSN	Low Earth	Test flight	07:55	Successful
12 April; 06:07:00	Yuri Gagarin, first crewed spaceflight in history to orbit the Earth. Equipment module did not fully separate until reentry was underway. Gagarin ejected from the spacecraft following reentry due to a predicted hard landing, and landed separately at 08:05.					
25 April; 16:15	(United States) Atlas LV-3B		(United States) Cape Canaveral LC-14		(United States) US Air Force	
25 April; 16:15	(United States) Mercury-Atlas 3	NASA	Intended: Low Earth	Test flight	16:23	Launch failure
25 April; 16:15	Carrier rocket destroyed by range safety 43.4 seconds after launch, following failure of guidance system to execute pitch and roll commands, spacecraft separated by launch escape system and travelled 1.8 kilometres (1.1 mi) downrange, reaching an apogee of 7.2 kilometres (4.5 mi).					
27 April; 14:16:38	(United States) Juno II		(United States) Cape Canaveral LC-26B		(United States) ABMA	
27 April; 14:16:38	(United States) Explorer 11 (S-15)	NASA	Low Earth	GR astronomy	In orbit	Partial spacecraft failure
27 April; 14:16:38	Onboard recorder failed during or immediately after launch, data returned through direct transmission.					
← Jan; Feb; Mar; Apr; May; Jun; Jul; Aug; Sep; Oct; Nov; Dec →; === May ===
24 May; 19:48:05	(United States) Juno II		(United States) Cape Canaveral LC-26B		(United States) ABMA	
24 May; 19:48:05	(United States) Explorer S-45A	NASA	Intended: Highly elliptical	Ionospheric	27 April	Launch failure
24 May; 19:48:05	Second stage failed to ignite, final flight of Juno II.					
← Jan; Feb; Mar; Apr; May; Jun; Jul; Aug; Sep; Oct; Nov; Dec →; === June ===
8 June; 21:16	(United States) Thor DM-21 Agena-B		(United States) Vandenberg LC-75-3-4		(United States) US Air Force	
8 June; 21:16	(United States) Discoverer 24 (KH-5 3/9018A)	US Air Force	Intended: Low Earth	Optical imaging	8 June	Launch failure
8 June; 21:16	(United States) SRV 541	US Air Force	Intended: Low Earth	Film return	8 June	Launch failure
8 June; 21:16	Failed to orbit.					
16 June; 23:02	(United States) Thor DM-21 Agena-B		(United States) Vandenberg LC-75-1-1		(United States) US Air Force	
16 June; 23:02	(United States) Discoverer 25 (KH-2 5/9017)	US Air Force	Low Earth	Optical imaging	12 July	Successful
16 June; 23:02	(United States) SRV 510	US Air Force	Low Earth	Film return	19 June	Successful
29 June; 04:22	(United States) Thor DM-21 Ablestar		(United States) Cape Canaveral LC-17B		(United States) US Air Force	
29 June; 04:22	(United States) Transit 4A	US Navy	Low Earth	Navigation; Technology	In orbit	Successful
29 June; 04:22	(United States) Injun-1	Iowa	Low Earth	Ionospheric	In orbit	Partial spacecraft failure
29 June; 04:22	(United States) Solrad 3 (GRAB-3)	US Navy/NRL	Low Earth	Radiation; ELINT	In orbit	Partial spacecraft failure
29 June; 04:22	Injun-1 and Solrad 3 failed to separate from each other, particularly affecting operations of the Injun satellite, Transit 4A carried a SNAP-3 nuclear reactor. After completing the mission, the Able upper stage exploded in orbit, creating hundreds of space debris.					
30 June; 17:09	(United States) Scout X-1		(United States) Wallops Island LA-3		(United States) NASA	
30 June; 17:09	(United States) Explorer S-55	NASA	Intended: Low Earth	Technology; Meteorite research	30 June	Launch failure
30 June; 17:09	Third stage failed to ignite.					
← Jan; Feb; Mar; Apr; May; Jun; Jul; Aug; Sep; Oct; Nov; Dec →
For flights after 30 June, see 1961 in spaceflight (July–December)

== Suborbital launches ==
- ← Jan
- Feb
- Mar
- Apr
- May
- Jun
- Jul
- Aug
- Sep
- Oct
- Nov
- Dec →

Date and time (UTC)	Rocket	Flight number	Launch site		LSP	
Date and time (UTC)	Payload (⚀ = CubeSat)	Operator	Orbit	Function	Decay (UTC)	Outcome
Date and time (UTC)	Remarks					
=== January ===
6 January; 00:10	(United States) MGM-31 Pershing I		(United States) Cape Canaveral LC-30		(United States) US Army	
6 January; 00:10		US Army	Suborbital	Missile test	6 January	Launch failure
7 January; 17:33:42	(United States) RM-89 Blue Scout I		(United States) Cape Canaveral LC-18B		(United States) US Air Force	
7 January; 17:33:42		HCO	Suborbital	Plasma research Astronomy	7 January	Successful
7 January; 17:33:42	Apogee: 1,600 kilometres (990 mi)					
10 January; 17:15	(United States) UGM-27 Polaris A2		(United States) Cape Canaveral LC-29A		(United States) US Navy	
10 January; 17:15		US Navy	Suborbital	Missile test	10 January	Successful
10 January; 17:15	Apogee: 1,000 kilometres (620 mi)					
10 January	(Soviet Union) R-12 Dvina		(Soviet Union) Kapustin Yar		(Soviet Union) MVS	
10 January		MVS	Suborbital	Missile test	10 January	Successful
10 January	Apogee: 402 kilometres (250 mi)					
11 January; 18:40	(United States) UGM-27 Polaris A1		(United States) USS Robert E. Lee, ETR		(United States) US Navy	
11 January; 18:40		US Navy	Suborbital	Missile test	11 January	Launch failure
11 January; 18:40	Apogee: 20 kilometres (12 mi)					
12 January; 16:54	(United States) Nike-Cajun		(Italy) Salto di Quirra		(Italy) CRA	
12 January; 16:54		ROSAP	Suborbital	Aeronomy	12 January	Successful
12 January; 16:54	Apogee: 160 kilometres (99 mi), first Italian spaceflight					
13 January	(Soviet Union) R-12 Dvina		(Soviet Union) Kapustin Yar		(Soviet Union) MVS	
13 January		MVS	Suborbital	Missile test	13 January	Successful
13 January	Apogee: 402 kilometres (250 mi)					
13 January	(Soviet Union) R-5 Pobeda		(Soviet Union) Kapustin Yar		(Soviet Union) OKB-30	
13 January		OKB-30	Suborbital	Target	13 January	Successful
13 January	Apogee: 300 kilometres (190 mi)					
14 January; 01:19:04	(Soviet Union) R-7A Semyorka		(Soviet Union) Baikonur Site 31/6		(Soviet Union) RVSN	
14 January; 01:19:04		RVSN	Suborbital	Missile test	14 January	Successful
14 January; 01:19:04	Apogee: 1,350 kilometres (840 mi), first launch from Site 31					
14 January	(Soviet Union) R-12 Dvina		(Soviet Union) Kapustin Yar		(Soviet Union) MVS	
14 January		MVS	Suborbital	Missile test	14 January	Successful
14 January	Apogee: 402 kilometres (250 mi)					
14 January	(Soviet Union) R-5 Pobeda		(Soviet Union) Kapustin Yar		(Soviet Union) OKB-30	
14 January		OKB-30	Suborbital	Target	14 January	Successful
14 January	Apogee: 300 kilometres (190 mi)					
14 January	(United States) UGM-27 Polaris A1		(United States) USS Robert E. Lee, ETR		(United States) US Navy	
14 January		US Navy	Suborbital	Missile test	14 January	Launch failure
14 January	Apogee: 20 kilometres (12 mi)					
17 January; 21:25	(United States) Nike-Asp		(United States) Wallops Island		(United States) NASA	
17 January; 21:25		NASA	Suborbital	Test flight	17 January	Successful
17 January; 21:25	Apogee: 209 kilometres (130 mi)					
18 January; 04:00	(United States) Trailblazer 1		(United States) Wallops Island		(United States) NASA	
18 January; 04:00		NASA	Suborbital	REV Test	18 January	Successful
18 January; 04:00	Apogee: 260 kilometres (160 mi)					
19 January; 12:42	(United States) Iris		(United States) Wallops Island LA-1		(United States) NASA	
19 January; 12:42		NASA	Suborbital	Aeronomy	19 January	Launch failure
19 January; 12:42	Apogee: 138 kilometres (86 mi)					
20 January; 20:53	(United States) HGM-25A Titan I		(United States) Cape Canaveral LC-19		(United States) US Air Force	
20 January; 20:53		US Air Force	Suborbital	Missile test	20 January	Launch failure
23 January; 21:02	(United States) SM-65D Atlas		(United States) Cape Canaveral LC-12		(United States) US Air Force	
23 January; 21:02		US Air Force	Suborbital	Missile test	23 January	Successful
23 January; 21:02	Apogee: 1,800 kilometres (1,100 mi)					
24 January; 21:55	(United States) SM-65E Atlas		(United States) Cape Canaveral LC-13		(United States) US Air Force	
24 January; 21:55		US Air Force	Suborbital	Missile test	24 January	Launch failure
24 January; 21:55	Apogee: 500 kilometres (310 mi), went out of control					
26 January; 00:30	(United States) MGM-31 Pershing I		(United States) Cape Canaveral LC-30A		(United States) US Army	
26 January; 00:30		US Army	Suborbital	Missile test	26 January	Successful
26 January; 00:30	Apogee: 250 kilometres (160 mi)					
30 January; 23:20	(United States) Aerobee-150 (Hi)		(United States) Eglin		(United States) US Air Force	
30 January; 23:20		US Air Force	Suborbital	Aeronomy	30 January	Successful
30 January; 23:20	Apogee: 204 kilometres (127 mi)					
31 January; 16:54:51	(United States) Redstone MRLV		(United States) Cape Canaveral LC-5		(United States) NASA	
31 January; 16:54:51	(United States) Mercury-Redstone 2	NASA	Suborbital	Test flight	31 January	Successful
31 January; 16:54:51	Apogee: 251 kilometres (156 mi), carried Ham, a chimpanzee					
January	(Soviet Union) R-14 Chusovaya		(Soviet Union) Kapustin Yar		(Soviet Union) RVSN	
January		RVSN	Suborbital	Missile test	January	Successful
January	Apogee: 675 kilometres (419 mi)					
January	(Soviet Union) R-14 Chusovaya		(Soviet Union) Kapustin Yar		(Soviet Union) RVSN	
January		RVSN	Suborbital	Missile test	January	Successful
January	Apogee: 675 kilometres (419 mi)					
January	(Soviet Union) R-14 Chusovaya		(Soviet Union) Kapustin Yar		(Soviet Union) RVSN	
January		RVSN	Suborbital	Missile test	January	Successful
January	Apogee: 675 kilometres (419 mi)					
January	(Soviet Union) R-14 Chusovaya		(Soviet Union) Kapustin Yar		(Soviet Union) RVSN	
January		RVSN	Suborbital	Missile test	January	Successful
January	Apogee: 675 kilometres (419 mi)					
January	(Soviet Union) R-14 Chusovaya		(Soviet Union) Kapustin Yar		(Soviet Union) RVSN	
January		RVSN	Suborbital	Missile test	January	Successful
January	Apogee: 675 kilometres (419 mi)					
January	(United States) Kisha-Judi		(United States) Tonopah		(United States) Sandia	
January		Sandia	Suborbital	Test flight	January	Successful
January	Apogee: 100 kilometres (62 mi)					
=== February ===
1 February; 15:59	(United States) LGM-30A Minuteman IA		(United States) Cape Canaveral LC-31A		(United States) US Air Force	
1 February; 15:59		US Air Force	Suborbital	Missile test	1 February	Successful
1 February; 15:59	Apogee: 1,300 kilometres (810 mi)					
1 February	(Soviet Union) R-12 Dvina		(Soviet Union) Kapustin Yar		(Soviet Union) MVS	
1 February		MVS	Suborbital	Missile test	1 February	Successful
1 February	Apogee: 402 kilometres (250 mi)					
2 February; 19:00	(Soviet Union) R-16		(Soviet Union) Baikonur Site 41		(Soviet Union) RVSN	
2 February; 19:00		RVSN	Suborbital	Missile test	2 February	Launch failure
5 February; 13:48	(United States) Aerobee-150A		(United States) Wallops Island		(United States) NASA	
5 February; 13:48		NASA	Suborbital	Technology	5 February	Successful
5 February; 13:48	Apogee: 152 kilometres (94 mi)					
6 February; 21:40	(United States) UGM-27 Polaris A2		(United States) Cape Canaveral LC-25A		(United States) US Navy	
6 February; 21:40		US Navy	Suborbital	Missile test	6 February	Launch failure
7 February; 12:46	(United Kingdom) Black Knight 201		(Australia) Woomera LA-5A		(United Kingdom) RAE	
7 February; 12:46		RAE	Suborbital	REV Test	7 February	Successful
7 February; 12:46	Apogee: 687 kilometres (427 mi)					
8 February	(Soviet Union) R-14 Chusovaya		(Soviet Union) Kapustin Yar		(Soviet Union) RVSN	
8 February		RVSN	Suborbital	Missile test	8 February	Successful
8 February	Apogee: 675 kilometres (419 mi)					
10 February; 05:55	(United States) HGM-25A Titan I		(United States) Cape Canaveral LC-20		(United States) US Air Force	
10 February; 05:55		US Air Force	Suborbital	Missile test	10 February	Successful
10 February; 05:55	Apogee: 1,000 kilometres (620 mi)					
10 February	(Soviet Union) R-12 Dvina		(Soviet Union) Kapustin Yar		(Soviet Union) MVS	
10 February		MVS	Suborbital	Missile test	10 February	Successful
10 February	Apogee: 402 kilometres (250 mi)					
10 February	(Soviet Union) R-12 Dvina		(Soviet Union) Kapustin Yar		(Soviet Union) MVS	
10 February		MVS	Suborbital	Missile test	10 February	Successful
10 February	Apogee: 402 kilometres (250 mi)					
13 February; 04:39	(Soviet Union) R-7A Semyorka		(Soviet Union) Baikonur Site 31/6		(Soviet Union) RVSN	
13 February; 04:39		RVSN	Suborbital	Missile test	13 February	Successful
13 February; 04:39	Apogee: 1,350 kilometres (840 mi)					
13 February; 13:58	(United Kingdom) Skylark-2		(Australia) Woomera LA-2		(United Kingdom) RAE	
13 February; 13:58		UCL	Suborbital	Aeronomy	13 February	Successful
13 February; 13:58	Apogee: 146 kilometres (91 mi)					
13 February	(France) Véronique		(France) Hammaguira Blandine		(France) CASDN	
13 February		LPA	Suborbital	Aeronomy	13 February	Launch failure
14 February; 23:50	(United States) Nike-Cajun		(United States) Wallops Island		(United States) NASA	
14 February; 23:50		NASA	Suborbital	Aeronomy	14 February	Successful
14 February; 23:50	Apogee: 130 kilometres (81 mi)					
14 February	(United States) Strongarm		(United States) Wallops Island		(United States) Ballistic Research Laboratory	
14 February		US Air Force/BRL	Suborbital	Test flight	14 February	Launch failure
14 February	Apogee: 100 kilometres (62 mi)					
15 February; 22:01	(France) Véronique		(France) Hammaguira Blandine		(France) CASDN	
15 February; 22:01		LPA	Suborbital	Aeronomy	15 February	Successful
15 February; 22:01	Apogee: 150 kilometres (93 mi)					
16 February; 01:27	(United States) MGM-31 Pershing I		(United States) Cape Canaveral LC-30		(United States) US Army	
16 February; 01:27		US Army	Suborbital	Missile test	16 February	Successful
16 February; 01:27	Apogee: 250 kilometres (160 mi)					
17 February; 07:17	(United States) Nike Apache		(United States) Wallops Island		(United States) US Air Force	
17 February; 07:17		US Air Force	Suborbital	Test flight	17 February	Successful
17 February; 07:17	Apogee: 200 kilometres (120 mi)					
17 February; 19:04	(United States) Aerobee-150 (Hi)		(United States) Eglin		(United States) US Air Force	
17 February; 19:04		US Air Force	Suborbital	Solar	17 February	Successful
17 February; 19:04	Apogee: 275 kilometres (171 mi)					
18 February	(United States) Strongarm		(United States) Wallops Island		(United States) BRL	
18 February		US Air Force/BRL	Suborbital	Test flight	18 February	Successful
18 February	Apogee: 2,027 kilometres (1,260 mi)					
18 February	(Soviet Union) R-5 Pobeda		(Soviet Union) Kapustin Yar		(Soviet Union) OKB-30	
18 February		OKB-30	Suborbital	Target	18 February	Successful
18 February	Apogee: 300 kilometres (190 mi)					
18 February	(France) Véronique		(France) Hammaguira Blandine		(France) CASDN	
18 February		LPA	Suborbital	Aeronomy	18 February	Launch failure
18 February	Apogee: 16 kilometres (9.9 mi)					
20 February	(United States) HGM-25A Titan I		(United States) Cape Canaveral LC-19		(United States) US Air Force	
20 February		US Air Force	Suborbital	Missile test	20 February	Successful
20 February	Apogee: 1,000 kilometres (620 mi)					
21 February; 14:12	(United States) Atlas LV-3B		(United States) Cape Canaveral LC-14		(United States) US Air Force	
21 February; 14:12	(United States) Mercury-Atlas 2	NASA	Suborbital	Test flight	14:28	Successful
21 February; 14:12	Apogee: 182 kilometres (113 mi)					
22 February; 07:00	(France) Véronique		(France) Hammaguira Blandine		(France) CASDN	
22 February; 07:00		CERMA	Suborbital	Biological research	22 February	Successful
22 February; 07:00	Apogee: 110 kilometres (68 mi)					
22 February	(Soviet Union) R-5 Pobeda		(Soviet Union) Kapustin Yar		(Soviet Union) OKB-30	
22 February		OKB-30	Suborbital	Target	22 February	Successful
22 February	Apogee: 300 kilometres (190 mi)					
24 February; 00:19	(United States) Nike-Cajun		(United States) Eglin		(United States) US Air Force	
24 February; 00:19		US Air Force	Suborbital	Aeronomy	24 February	Successful
24 February; 00:19	Apogee: 133 kilometres (83 mi)					
24 February; 18:29	(United States) SM-65E Atlas		(United States) Cape Canaveral LC-13		(United States) US Air Force	
24 February; 18:29		US Air Force	Suborbital	Missile test	24 February	Successful
24 February; 18:29	Apogee: 1,500 kilometres (930 mi)					
27 February; 00:52	(Soviet Union) R-7 Semyorka		(Soviet Union) Baikonur Site 31/6		(Soviet Union) RVSN	
27 February; 00:52		RVSN	Suborbital	Missile test	27 February	Successful
27 February; 00:52	Apogee: 1,350 kilometres (840 mi), final flight of R-7 Semyorka					
February	(Soviet Union) R-14 Chusovaya		(Soviet Union) Kapustin Yar		(Soviet Union) RVSN	
February		RVSN	Suborbital	Missile test	February	Successful
February	Apogee: 675 kilometres (419 mi)					
February	(Soviet Union) R-14 Chusovaya		(Soviet Union) Kapustin Yar		(Soviet Union) RVSN	
February		RVSN	Suborbital	Missile test	February	Successful
February	Apogee: 675 kilometres (419 mi)					
=== March ===
1 March; 15:42	(United States) Nike-Asp		(United States) Eglin		(United States) US Air Force	
1 March; 15:42		US Air Force	Suborbital	Solar	1 March	Successful
1 March; 15:42	Apogee: 200 kilometres (120 mi)					
1 March; 18:19	(United States) UGM-27 Polaris A2		(United States) USNS Observation Island, ETR		(United States) US Navy	
1 March; 18:19		US Navy	Suborbital	Missile test	1 March	Successful
1 March; 18:19	Apogee: 1,000 kilometres (620 mi)					
2 March; 05:07	(United States) MGM-31 Pershing I		(United States) Cape Canaveral LC-30A		(United States) US Army	
2 March; 05:07		US Army	Suborbital	Missile test	2 March	Successful
2 March; 05:07	Apogee: 250 kilometres (160 mi)					
2 March	(Soviet Union) R-12 Dvina		(Soviet Union) Makat		(Soviet Union) OKB-30	
2 March		OKB-30	Suborbital	Target	2 March	Successful
2 March	Apogee: 402 kilometres (250 mi)					
3 March; 03:39	(United States) Nike-Cajun		(United States) Eglin		(United States) US Air Force	
3 March; 03:39		US Air Force	Suborbital	Ionospheric	3 March	Launch failure
3 March; 03:39	Apogee: 100 kilometres (62 mi)					
3 March; 13:59:19	(Soviet Union) R-16		(Soviet Union) Baikonur Site 41		(Soviet Union) RVSN	
3 March; 13:59:19		RVSN	Suborbital	Missile test	3 March	Successful
3 March; 13:59:19	Apogee: 1,210 kilometres (750 mi)					
3 March; 16:02	(United States) RM-90 Blue Scout II		(United States) Cape Canaveral LC-18B		(United States) US Air Force	
3 March; 16:02		US Air Force	Suborbital	Plasma research	3 March	Successful
3 March; 16:02	Apogee: 2,540 kilometres (1,580 mi)					
3 March	(France) Antares (OPd-56-39-22D)		(France) CERES		(France) ONERA	
3 March		ONERA	Suborbital	REV Test	3 March	Successful
3 March	Apogee: 150 kilometres (93 mi)					
3 March	(United States) HGM-25A Titan I		(United States) Cape Canaveral LC-20		(United States) US Air Force	
3 March		US Air Force	Suborbital	Missile test	3 March	Launch failure
4 March	(Soviet Union) R-12 Dvina		(Soviet Union) Makat		(Soviet Union) OKB-30	
4 March		OKB-30	Suborbital	Target	4 March	Successful
4 March	Apogee: 460 kilometres (290 mi)					
6 March; 09:56	(United Kingdom) Skylark-2C		(Australia) Woomera LA-2		(United Kingdom) RAE	
6 March; 09:56		UCL/QUB	Suborbital	Aeronomy	6 March	Successful
6 March; 09:56	Apogee: 231 kilometres (144 mi)					
6 March	(France) Antares (OPd-56-39-22D)		(France) CERES		(France) ONERA	
6 March		ONERA	Suborbital	REV Test	6 March	Successful
6 March	Apogee: 150 kilometres (93 mi)					
7 March	(France) Antares (OPd-56-39-22D)		(France) CERES		(France) ONERA	
7 March		ONERA	Suborbital	REV Test	7 March	Successful
7 March	Apogee: 150 kilometres (93 mi)					
8 March; 16:53	(United States) Aerobee-300		(United States) Eglin		(United States) US Air Force	
8 March; 16:53		US Air Force	Suborbital	Ionospheric	8 March	Successful
8 March; 16:53	Apogee: 400 kilometres (250 mi)					
8 March; 17:53	(United States) Astrobee-1500		(United States) Eglin		(United States) US Air Force	
8 March; 17:53		US Air Force	Suborbital	Ionospheric	8 March	Successful
8 March; 17:53	Apogee: 431 kilometres (268 mi)					
9 March	(United States) UGM-27 Polaris A2		(United States) USNS Observation Island, ETR		(United States) US Navy	
9 March		US Navy	Suborbital	Missile test	9 March	Successful
9 March	Apogee: 1,000 kilometres (620 mi)					
10 March	(Soviet Union) R-12 Dvina		(Soviet Union) Kapustin Yar		(Soviet Union) MVS	
10 March		MVS	Suborbital	Missile test	10 March	Successful
10 March	Apogee: 402 kilometres (250 mi)					
11 March	(Soviet Union) R-12 Dvina		(Soviet Union) Kapustin Yar		(Soviet Union) MVS	
11 March		MVS	Suborbital	Missile test	11 March	Successful
11 March	Apogee: 402 kilometres (250 mi)					
14 March; 04:17	(United States) SM-65E Atlas		(United States) Cape Canaveral LC-13		(United States) US Air Force	
14 March; 04:17		US Air Force	Suborbital	Missile test	14 March	Launch failure
14 March; 04:17	Apogee: 500 kilometres (310 mi), propellant system malfunctioned					
14 March; 21:52	(United States) Nike-Cajun		(United States) Eglin		(United States) US Air Force	
14 March; 21:52		US Air Force	Suborbital	Ionospheric	14 March	Successful
14 March; 21:52	Apogee: 118 kilometres (73 mi)					
15 March; 17:47	(United States) Nike-Cajun		(United States) Wallops Island		(United States) NASA	
15 March; 17:47		NASA	Suborbital	Test flight	15 March	Successful
15 March; 17:47	Apogee: 130 kilometres (81 mi)					
15 March	(United States) UGM-27 Polaris A2		(United States) Cape Canaveral LC-29A		(United States) US Navy	
15 March		US Navy	Suborbital	Missile test	15 March	Successful
15 March	Apogee: 1,000 kilometres (620 mi)					
16 March; 01:19	(United States) MGM-31 Pershing I		(United States) Cape Canaveral LC-30A		(United States) US Army	
16 March; 01:19		US Army	Suborbital	Missile test	16 March	Successful
16 March; 01:19	Apogee: 250 kilometres (160 mi)					
17 March	(Soviet Union) R-12 Dvina		(Soviet Union) Kapustin Yar		(Soviet Union) MVS	
17 March		MVS	Suborbital	Missile test	17 March	Successful
17 March	Apogee: 402 kilometres (250 mi)					
23 March; 16:25	(United States) UGM-27 Polaris A1		(United States) USS Theodore Roosevelt, ETR		(United States) US Navy	
23 March; 16:25		US Navy	Suborbital	Missile test	23 March	Launch failure
23 March; 16:25	Apogee: 10 kilometres (6.2 mi)					
23 March; 19:25	(United States) UGM-27 Polaris A1		(United States) USS Theodore Roosevelt, ETR		(United States) US Navy	
23 March; 19:25		US Navy	Suborbital	Missile test	23 March	Successful
23 March; 19:25	Apogee: 500 kilometres (310 mi)					
23 March; 22:41	(United States) UGM-27 Polaris A1		(United States) USS Theodore Roosevelt, ETR		(United States) US Navy	
23 March; 22:41		US Navy	Suborbital	Missile test	23 March	Launch failure
23 March; 22:41	Apogee: 10 kilometres (6.2 mi)					
24 March; 17:30	(United States) Redstone MRLV		(United States) Cape Canaveral LC-5		(United States) NASA	
24 March; 17:30	(United States) Mercury-Redstone BD	NASA	Suborbital	Test flight	24 March	Successful
24 March; 17:30	Apogee: 181 kilometres (112 mi)					
24 March; 19:17	(United States) Nike-Cajun		(United States) Eglin		(United States) US Air Force	
24 March; 19:17		US Air Force	Suborbital	Ionospheric	24 March	Successful
24 March; 19:17	Apogee: 100 kilometres (62 mi)					
25 March; 01:49	(United States) SM-65E Atlas		(United States) Cape Canaveral LC-13		(United States) US Air Force	
25 March; 01:49		US Air Force	Suborbital	Missile test	25 March	Launch failure
25 March; 01:49	Apogee: 1,000 kilometres (620 mi), electrical system malfunctioned					
25 March	(Soviet Union) R-12 Dvina		(Soviet Union) Kapustin Yar		(Soviet Union) MVS	
25 March		MVS	Suborbital	Missile test	25 March	Successful
25 March	Apogee: 402 kilometres (250 mi)					
26 March; 16:54	(United States) Aerobee-300A		(United States) Wallops Island		(United States) NASA	
26 March; 16:54		Michigan	Suborbital	Ionospheric	26 March	Successful
26 March; 16:54	Apogee: 386 kilometres (240 mi)					
26 March	(Soviet Union) R-5 Pobeda		(Soviet Union) Kapustin Yar		(Soviet Union) OKB-30	
26 March		OKB-30	Suborbital	Target	26 March	Successful
26 March	Apogee: 300 kilometres (190 mi)					
27 March; 04:08	(Japan) Kappa-8		(Japan) Akita		(Japan) ISAS	
27 March; 04:08		ISAS/RRL	Suborbital	Ionospheric	27 March	Successful
27 March; 04:08	Apogee: 172 kilometres (107 mi)					
28 March	(Soviet Union) R-12 Dvina		(Soviet Union) Kapustin Yar		(Soviet Union) MVS	
28 March		MVS	Suborbital	Missile test	28 March	Successful
28 March	Apogee: 402 kilometres (250 mi)					
28 March	(Soviet Union) R-12 Dvina		(Soviet Union) Kapustin Yar		(Soviet Union) MVS	
28 March		MVS	Suborbital	Missile test	28 March	Successful
28 March	Apogee: 402 kilometres (250 mi)					
28 March	(United States) HGM-25A Titan I		(United States) Cape Canaveral LC-19		(United States) US Air Force	
28 March		US Air Force	Suborbital	Missile test	28 March	Successful
28 March	Apogee: 1,000 kilometres (620 mi)					
30 March; 05:13:43	(United States) PGM-17 Thor DM-18A		(United States) Vandenberg LC-75-2-7		(United Kingdom) Royal Air Force	
30 March; 05:13:43		Royal Air Force	Suborbital	Missile test	30 March	Successful
30 March; 05:13:43	Apogee: 520 kilometres (320 mi)					
31 March; 19:42	(United States) HGM-25A Titan I		(United States) Cape Canaveral LC-20		(United States) US Air Force	
31 March; 19:42		US Air Force	Suborbital	Missile test	31 March	Launch failure
March	(Soviet Union) R-12 Dvina		(Soviet Union) Kapustin Yar		(Soviet Union) MVS	
March		MVS	Suborbital	Missile test	March	Launch failure
1st Quarter	(United States) Nike Zeus		(United States) White Sands LC-38		(United States) US Army	
1st Quarter		US Army	Suborbital	Missile test	1st Quarter	Successful
1st Quarter	Apogee: 150 kilometres (93 mi)					
=== April ===
1 April; 03:25	(Japan) Kappa-9L		(Japan) Akita		(Japan) ISAS	
1 April; 03:25		ISAS	Suborbital	Test flight	1 April	Successful
1 April; 03:25	Apogee: 350 kilometres (220 mi)					
2 April; 14:06	(Soviet Union) R-16		(Soviet Union) Baikonur Site 41		(Soviet Union) RVSN	
2 April; 14:06		RVSN	Suborbital	Missile test	2 April	Successful
2 April; 14:06	Apogee: 1,210 kilometres (750 mi)					
3 April	(Soviet Union) R-12 Dvina		(Soviet Union) Kapustin Yar		(Soviet Union) MVS	
3 April		MVS	Suborbital	Missile test	3 April	Successful
3 April	Apogee: 402 kilometres (250 mi)					
4 April	(Soviet Union) R-12 Dvina		(Soviet Union) Kapustin Yar		(Soviet Union) MVS	
4 April		MVS	Suborbital	Missile test	4 April	Successful
4 April	Apogee: 402 kilometres (250 mi)					
5 April; 10:56	(United Kingdom) Skylark-2		(Australia) Woomera LA-2		(United Kingdom) RAE	
5 April; 10:56		UCL	Suborbital	Aeronomy	5 April	Successful
5 April; 10:56	Apogee: 158 kilometres (98 mi)					
5 April; 12:57	(United States) Nike-Cajun		(United States) Wallops Island		(United States) NASA	
5 April; 12:57		NASA	Suborbital	Aeronomy	5 April	Successful
5 April; 12:57	Apogee: 116 kilometres (72 mi)					
6 April	(United States) UGM-27 Polaris A1		(United States) USS Theodore Roosevelt, ETR		(United States) US Navy	
6 April		US Navy	Suborbital	Missile test	6 April	Successful
6 April	Apogee: 500 kilometres (310 mi)					
7 April	(Soviet Union) R-12 Dvina		(Soviet Union) Kapustin Yar		(Soviet Union) MVS	
7 April		MVS	Suborbital	Missile test	7 April	Successful
7 April	Apogee: 402 kilometres (250 mi)					
9 April; 09:16	(Soviet Union) R-9 Desna		(Soviet Union) Baikonur Site 51		(Soviet Union) RVSN	
9 April; 09:16		RVSN	Suborbital	Missile test	9 April	Successful
9 April; 09:16	Apogee: 1,160 kilometres (720 mi)					
10 April	(Soviet Union) R-12 Dvina		(Soviet Union) Kapustin Yar		(Soviet Union) MVS	
10 April		MVS	Suborbital	Missile test	10 April	Successful
10 April	Apogee: 402 kilometres (250 mi)					
11 April; 15:40	(United States) UGM-27 Polaris A2		(United States) Cape Canaveral LC-29A		(United States) US Navy	
11 April; 15:40		US Navy	Suborbital	Missile test	11 April	Launch failure
11 April; 15:40	Apogee: 50 kilometres (31 mi)					
11 April; 15:40	(United States) UGM-27 Polaris A2		(United States) Cape Canaveral LC-29A		(United States) US Navy	
11 April; 15:40		US Navy	Suborbital	Missile test	11 April	Launch failure
11 April; 15:40	Apogee: 50 kilometres (31 mi)					
12 April; 06:07	(United States) RM-90 Blue Scout II		(United States) Cape Canaveral LC-18B		(United States) US Air Force	
12 April; 06:07		US Air Force	Suborbital	Plasma research	12 April	Successful
12 April; 06:07	Apogee: 1,931 kilometres (1,200 mi)					
14 April; 17:15	(United States) Aerobee-150A		(United States) Wallops Island		(United States) NASA	
14 April; 17:15		NASA	Suborbital	Test flight	14 April	Successful
14 April; 17:15	Apogee: 206 kilometres (128 mi)					
14 April	(Soviet Union) R-7A Semyorka		(Soviet Union) Baikonur Site 31/6		(Soviet Union) RVSN	
14 April		RVSN	Suborbital	Missile test	14 April	Launch failure
15 April; 13:58:29	(Soviet Union) R-16		(Soviet Union) Baikonur Site 41		(Soviet Union) RVSN	
15 April; 13:58:29		RVSN	Suborbital	Missile test	15 April	Launch failure
18 April; 04:40	(United States) Aerobee-150 (Hi)		(United States) White Sands LC-35		(United States) NRL	
18 April; 04:40		NRL	Suborbital	UV Astronomy	18 April	Successful
18 April; 04:40	Apogee: 242 kilometres (150 mi)					
18 April; 12:27	(Japan) Kappa-8		(Japan) Akita		(Japan) ISAS	
18 April; 12:27		TAO/TOK	Suborbital	Ionospheric	18 April	Successful
18 April; 12:27	Apogee: 150 kilometres (93 mi)					
19 April; 09:36	(United States) Nike-Asp		(United States) Wallops Island		(United States) NASA	
19 April; 09:36		GCA	Suborbital	Aeronomy	19 April	Successful
19 April; 09:36	Apogee: 164 kilometres (102 mi)					
19 April; 18:37	(United States) Nike-Asp		(Italy) Salto di Quirra		(Italy) CRA	
19 April; 18:37		ROSAP	Suborbital	Aeronomy	19 April	Successful
19 April; 18:37	Apogee: 200 kilometres (120 mi)					
19 April	(United States) UGM-27 Polaris A1		(United States) USS Robert E. Lee, ETR		(United States) US Navy	
19 April		US Navy	Suborbital	Missile test	19 April	Successful
19 April	Apogee: 500 kilometres (310 mi)					
19 April	(Soviet Union) R-12 Dvina		(Soviet Union) Kapustin Yar		(Soviet Union) MVS	
19 April		MVS	Suborbital	Missile test	19 April	Successful
19 April	Apogee: 402 kilometres (250 mi)					
20 April; 03:46	(United States) Nike-Asp		(Italy) Salto di Quirra		(Italy) CRA	
20 April; 03:46		ROSAP	Suborbital	Aeronomy	20 April	Successful
20 April; 03:46	Apogee: 190 kilometres (120 mi)					
20 April; 18:39	(United States) Nike-Asp		(Italy) Salto di Quirra		(Italy) CRA	
20 April; 18:39		ROSAP	Suborbital	Aeronomy	20 April	Successful
20 April; 18:39	Apogee: 188 kilometres (117 mi)					
20 April; 18:43	(United States) Nike-Asp		(Italy) Salto di Quirra		(Italy) CRA	
20 April; 18:43		ROSAP	Suborbital	Aeronomy	20 April	Successful
20 April; 18:43	Apogee: 190 kilometres (120 mi)					
21 April; 00:12	(United States) Nike-Asp		(United States) Wallops Island		(United States) NASA	
21 April; 00:12		GCA	Suborbital	Aeronomy	21 April	Launch failure
21 April; 00:12	Apogee: 180 kilometres (110 mi)					
21 April; 02:26:14	(Soviet Union) R-9 Desna		(Soviet Union) Baikonur Site 51		(Soviet Union) RVSN	
21 April; 02:26:14		RVSN	Suborbital	Missile test	21 April	Successful
21 April; 02:26:14	Apogee: 1,160 kilometres (720 mi)					
21 April; 05:56:20	(United States) Trailblazer 1		(United States) Wallops Island		(United States) NASA	
21 April; 05:56:20		US Air Force	Suborbital	REV Test	21 April	Successful
21 April; 05:56:20	Apogee: 280 kilometres (170 mi)					
21 April; 09:34	(United States) Nike-Asp		(United States) Wallops Island		(United States) NASA	
21 April; 09:34		GCA	Suborbital	Aeronomy	21 April	Launch failure
21 April; 09:34	Apogee: 200 kilometres (120 mi)					
21 April; 09:39	(United States) Nike-Asp		(United States) Wallops Island		(United States) NASA	
21 April; 09:39		GCA	Suborbital	Aeronomy	21 April	Successful
21 April; 09:39	Apogee: 165 kilometres (103 mi)					
21 April; 12:00	(United States) Aerobee-150A		(United States) Wallops Island		(United States) NASA	
21 April; 12:00		NASA	Suborbital	Technology	21 April	Successful
21 April; 12:00	Apogee: 154 kilometres (96 mi)					
21 April; 15:53	(United States) MGM-31 Pershing I		(United States) Cape Canaveral LC-30A		(United States) US Army	
21 April; 15:53		US Army	Suborbital	Missile test	21 April	Successful
21 April; 15:53	Apogee: 250 kilometres (160 mi)					
21 April	(Soviet Union) R-16		(Soviet Union) Baikonur Site 41		(Soviet Union) RVSN	
21 April		RVSN	Suborbital	Missile test	21 April	Launch failure
22 April	(United States) PGM-19 Jupiter		(United States) Cape Canaveral LC-26A		(United States) US Army	
22 April		US Army	Suborbital	Missile test	22 April	Successful
22 April	Apogee: 500 kilometres (310 mi)					
25 April; 02:26	(Soviet Union) R-9 Desna		(Soviet Union) Baikonur Site 51		(Soviet Union) RVSN	
25 April; 02:26		RVSN	Suborbital	Missile test	25 April	Launch failure
27 April; 20:02	(United States) Javelin		(United States) Wallops Island		(United States) NASA	
27 April; 20:02		NASA	Suborbital	Ionospheric	27 April	Successful
27 April; 20:02	Apogee: 724 kilometres (450 mi)					
27 April; 22:32	(United States) Nike-Cajun		(United States) Wallops Island		(United States) NASA	
27 April; 22:32		NASA	Suborbital	Aeronomy	27 April	Launch failure
27 April; 22:32	Apogee: 18 kilometres (11 mi)					
27 April	(Soviet Union) R-12 Dvina		(Soviet Union) Kapustin Yar		(Soviet Union) MVS	
27 April		MVS	Suborbital	Missile test	27 April	Successful
27 April	Apogee: 402 kilometres (250 mi)					
28 April	(Soviet Union) R-12 Dvina		(Soviet Union) Kapustin Yar		(Soviet Union) MVS	
28 April		MVS	Suborbital	Missile test	28 April	Successful
28 April	Apogee: 402 kilometres (250 mi)					
=== May ===
1 May; 12:10	(United Kingdom) Skylark-2		(Australia) Woomera LA-2		(United Kingdom) RAE	
1 May; 12:10		UCL	Suborbital	UV Astronomy	1 May	Successful
1 May; 12:10	Apogee: 155 kilometres (96 mi)					
1 May	(United States) UGM-27 Polaris A2		(United States) Cape Canaveral LC-29A		(United States) US Navy	
1 May		US Navy	Suborbital	Missile test	1 May	Successful
1 May	Apogee: 1,000 kilometres (620 mi)					
3 May; 17:00	(United States) UGM-27 Polaris A1		(United States) USS Abraham Lincoln, ETR		(United States) US Navy	
3 May; 17:00		US Navy	Suborbital	Missile test	3 May	Successful
3 May; 17:00	Apogee: 500 kilometres (310 mi)					
5 May; 14:34	(United States) Redstone MRLV		(United States) Cape Canaveral LC-5		(United States) NASA	
5 May; 14:34	(United States) Mercury-Redstone 3	NASA	Suborbital	Crewed flight	14:49	Successful
5 May; 14:34	Carried Alan Shepard, first American in space, apogee 187 kilometres (116 mi)					
5 May; 23:00	(United States) Nike-Cajun		(United States) Wallops Island		(United States) NASA	
5 May; 23:00		NASA	Suborbital	Aeronomy	5 May	Successful
5 May; 23:00	Apogee: 117 kilometres (73 mi)					
6 May; 04:54	(United States) Nike-Cajun		(United States) Wallops Island		(United States) NASA	
6 May; 04:54		NASA	Suborbital	Aeronomy	6 May	Successful
6 May; 04:54	Apogee: 117 kilometres (73 mi)					
8 May; 17:10	(United States) UGM-27 Polaris A2		(United States) Cape Canaveral LC-29A		(United States) US Navy	
8 May; 17:10		US Navy	Suborbital	Missile test	8 May	Successful
8 May; 17:10	Apogee: 1,000 kilometres (620 mi)					
9 May; 11:53	(United States) Nike-Cajun		(United States) Wallops Island		(United States) NASA	
9 May; 11:53		NASA	Suborbital	Aeronomy	9 May	Successful
9 May; 11:53	Apogee: 117 kilometres (73 mi)					
9 May; 12:07	(United Kingdom) Black Knight 201		(Australia) Woomera LA-5B		(United Kingdom) RAE	
9 May; 12:07		RAE	Suborbital	REV Test	9 May	Launch failure
9 May; 12:07	Apogee: 415 kilometres (258 mi)					
9 May; 16:00:22	(United States) RM-89 Blue Scout I		(United States) Cape Canaveral LC-18B		(United States) US Air Force	
9 May; 16:00:22		US Air Force	Suborbital	Plasma research	9 May	Launch failure
9 May; 16:00:22	Apogee: 10 kilometres (6.2 mi)					
10 May	(Soviet Union) R-12 Dvina		(Soviet Union) Kapustin Yar		(Soviet Union) MVS	
10 May		MVS	Suborbital	Missile test	10 May	Successful
10 May	Apogee: 402 kilometres (250 mi)					
13 May; 02:00	(United States) SM-65E Atlas		(United States) Cape Canaveral LC-11		(United States) US Air Force	
13 May; 02:00		US Air Force	Suborbital	Missile test	13 May	Successful
13 May; 02:00	Apogee: 1,500 kilometres (930 mi)					
13 May	(France) Antares (OPd-56-39-22D)		(France) Hammaguira		(France) ONERA	
13 May		ONERA	Suborbital	Ionospheric	13 May	Successful
13 May	Apogee: 280 kilometres (170 mi)					
16 May; 15:45	(United States) Aerobee-150 (Hi)		(United States) White Sands LC-35		(United States) US Air Force	
16 May; 15:45		US Air Force	Suborbital	Solar	16 May	Successful
16 May; 15:45	Apogee: 294 kilometres (183 mi)					
16 May; 17:00	(United States) Aerobee-150 (Hi)		(United States) White Sands LC-35		(United States) US Air Force	
16 May; 17:00		US Air Force	Suborbital	Solar	16 May	Successful
16 May; 17:00	Apogee: 312 kilometres (194 mi)					
16 May; 19:23:27	(Soviet Union) R-16		(Soviet Union) Baikonur Site 41		(Soviet Union) RVSN	
16 May; 19:23:27		RVSN	Suborbital	Missile test	16 May	Successful
16 May; 19:23:27	Apogee: 1,210 kilometres (750 mi)					
17 May	(United States) UGM-27 Polaris A1		(United States) USS Abraham Lincoln, ETR		(United States) US Navy	
17 May		US Navy	Suborbital	Missile test	17 May	Successful
17 May	Apogee: 500 kilometres (310 mi)					
17 May	(United States) UGM-27 Polaris A1		(United States) USS Abraham Lincoln, ETR		(United States) US Navy	
17 May		US Navy	Suborbital	Missile test	17 May	Successful
17 May	Apogee: 500 kilometres (310 mi)					
17 May	(United States) UGM-27 Polaris A1		(United States) USS Abraham Lincoln, ETR		(United States) US Navy	
17 May		US Navy	Suborbital	Missile test	17 May	Successful
17 May	Apogee: 500 kilometres (310 mi)					
17 May	(United States) UGM-27 Polaris A1		(United States) USS Abraham Lincoln, ETR		(United States) US Navy	
17 May		US Navy	Suborbital	Missile test	17 May	Successful
17 May	Apogee: 500 kilometres (310 mi)					
17 May	(United States) UGM-27 Polaris A1		(United States) USS Abraham Lincoln, ETR		(United States) US Navy	
17 May		US Navy	Suborbital	Missile test	17 May	Successful
17 May	Apogee: 500 kilometres (310 mi)					
18 May; 06:10	(United States) Trailblazer 1		(United States) Wallops Island		(United States) NASA	
18 May; 06:10		NASA	Suborbital	REV Test	18 May	Successful
18 May; 06:10	Apogee: 260 kilometres (160 mi)					
19 May; 02:00	(United States) MGM-31 Pershing I		(United States) Cape Canaveral LC-30		(United States) US Army	
19 May; 02:00		US Army	Suborbital	Missile test	19 May	Successful
19 May; 02:00	Apogee: 250 kilometres (160 mi)					
19 May; 14:18	(United States) LGM-30A Minuteman IA		(United States) Cape Canaveral LC-31A		(United States) US Air Force	
19 May; 14:18		US Air Force	Suborbital	Missile test	19 May	Launch failure
19 May; 14:18	Apogee: 100 kilometres (62 mi)					
23 May	(United States) HGM-25A Titan I		(United States) Cape Canaveral LC-20		(United States) US Air Force	
23 May		US Air Force	Suborbital	Missile test	23 May	Successful
23 May	Apogee: 1,000 kilometres (620 mi)					
24 May; 03:18:06	(Soviet Union) R-16		(Soviet Union) Baikonur Site 41/4		(Soviet Union) RVSN	
24 May; 03:18:06		RVSN	Suborbital	Missile test	24 May	Launch failure
24 May; 21:50:38	(United States) SM-65D Atlas		(United States) Vandenberg LC-576B-2		(United States) US Air Force	
24 May; 21:50:38		US Air Force	Suborbital	Missile test	24 May	Successful
24 May; 21:50:38	Apogee: 1,800 kilometres (1,100 mi)					
25 May; 17:03	(United States) Nike-Apache		(United States) Wallops Island		(United States) NASA	
25 May; 17:03		NASA	Suborbital	Test flight	25 May	Successful
25 May; 17:03	Apogee: 116 kilometres (72 mi)					
25 May	(United States) Aerobee-150 (Hi)		(United States) White Sands LC-35		(United States) US Air Force	
25 May		US Air Force	Suborbital	Solar	25 May	Successful
25 May	Apogee: 200 kilometres (120 mi)					
25 May	(United States) Nike Zeus		(United States) White Sands LC-38		(United States) US Army	
25 May		US Army	Suborbital	Missile test	25 May	Successful
25 May	Apogee: 150 kilometres (93 mi)					
25 May	(United States) UGM-27 Polaris A2		(United States) USNS Observation Island, ETR		(United States) US Navy	
25 May		US Navy	Suborbital	Missile test	25 May	Launch failure
26 May; 02:26	(United States) SM-65E Atlas		(United States) Cape Canaveral LC-13		(United States) US Air Force	
26 May; 02:26		US Air Force	Suborbital	Missile test	26 May	Successful
26 May; 02:26	Apogee: 1,500 kilometres (930 mi)					
27 May	(France) Centaure		(France) Hammaguira Bacchus		(France) CNES	
27 May		CNET	Suborbital	Test flight	27 May	Successful
27 May	Apogee: 130 kilometres (81 mi)					
29 May; 01:44:23	(Soviet Union) R-9 Desna		(Soviet Union) Baikonur Site 51		(Soviet Union) RVSN	
29 May; 01:44:23		RVSN	Suborbital	Missile test	29 May	Launch failure
29 May	(Soviet Union) R-12 Dvina		(Soviet Union) Kapustin Yar		(Soviet Union) MVS	
29 May		MVS	Suborbital	Missile test	29 May	Successful
29 May	Apogee: 402 kilometres (250 mi)					
29 May	(France) Centaure		(France) Hammaguira Bacchus		(France) CNES	
29 May		CNET	Suborbital	Test flight	29 May	Successful
29 May	Apogee: 130 kilometres (81 mi)					
30 May; 05:15	(United Kingdom) Skylark-2		(Australia) Woomera LA-2		(United Kingdom) RAE	
30 May; 05:15		RAE/WRE	Suborbital	Test flight	30 May	Successful
30 May; 05:15	Apogee: 149 kilometres (93 mi)					
May	(United States) Kiva-Hopi		(United States) Wallops Island		(United States) US Air Force	
May		US Air Force	Suborbital	Aeronomy	May	Successful
May	Apogee: 273 kilometres (170 mi)					
=== June ===
2 June; 05:12:14	(Soviet Union) R-9 Desna		(Soviet Union) Baikonur Site 51		(Soviet Union) RVSN	
2 June; 05:12:14		RVSN	Suborbital	Missile test	2 June	Launch failure
2 June; 17:24:30	(Soviet Union) R-16		(Soviet Union) Baikonur Site 41/4		(Soviet Union) RVSN	
2 June; 17:24:30		RVSN	Suborbital	Missile test	2 June	Successful
2 June; 17:24:30	Apogee: 1,210 kilometres (750 mi)					
4 June	(Soviet Union) R-14 Chusovaya		(Soviet Union) Kapustin Yar		(Soviet Union) RVSN	
4 June		RVSN	Suborbital	Missile test	4 June	Successful
4 June	Apogee: 675 kilometres (419 mi)					
6 June; 12:31	(United States) Aerobee-150 (Hi)		(United States) White Sands LC-35		(United States) US Air Force	
6 June; 12:31		US Air Force	Suborbital	Meteorite research	6 June	Successful
6 June; 12:31	Apogee: 165 kilometres (103 mi)					
6 June; 18:00	(Soviet Union) R-16		(Soviet Union) Baikonur Site 41/4		(Soviet Union) RVSN	
6 June; 18:00		RVSN	Suborbital	Missile test	6 June	Launch failure
6 June; 21:48	(United States) Nike-Cajun		(United States) Wallops Island		(United States) NASA	
6 June; 21:48		Michigan	Suborbital	Aeronomy	6 June	Successful
6 June; 21:48	Apogee: 150 kilometres (93 mi)					
7 June; 00:40	(United Kingdom) Skylark-2		(Australia) Woomera LA-2		(United Kingdom) RAE	
7 June; 00:40		RAE/WRE	Suborbital	Test flight	7 June	Successful
7 June; 00:40	Apogee: 184 kilometres (114 mi)					
7 June; 11:20	(United Kingdom) Black Knight 201		(Australia) Woomera LA-5		(United Kingdom) RAE	
7 June; 11:20		UCL	Suborbital	REV test Ionospheric	7 June	Launch failure
7 June; 11:20	Apogee: 583 kilometres (362 mi)					
7 June; 21:37:31	(United States) SM-65E Atlas		(United States) Vandenberg OSTF-1		(United States) US Air Force	
7 June; 21:37:31		US Air Force	Suborbital	Missile test	7 June	Launch failure
9 June; 05:11	(United States) MGM-31 Pershing I		(United States) Cape Canaveral LC-30		(United States) US Army	
9 June; 05:11		US Army	Suborbital	Missile test	9 June	Successful
9 June; 05:11	Apogee: 250 kilometres (160 mi)					
9 June; 18:02	(United States) Nike-Cajun		(United States) Wallops Island		(United States) NASA	
9 June; 18:02		Michigan	Suborbital	Aeronomy	9 June	Successful
9 June; 18:02	Apogee: 142 kilometres (88 mi)					
9 June	(Soviet Union) R-12 Dvina		(Soviet Union) Kapustin Yar		(Soviet Union) MVS	
9 June		MVS	Suborbital	Missile test	9 June	Successful
9 June	Apogee: 402 kilometres (250 mi)					
9 June	(Soviet Union) R-12 Dvina		(Soviet Union) Makat		(Soviet Union) OKB-30	
9 June		OKB-30	Suborbital	Target	9 June	Successful
9 June	Apogee: 402 kilometres (250 mi)					
10 June	(France) Véronique		(Algeria) Hammaguira Blandine		(France) CRS	
10 June		CNRS	Suborbital	Aeronomy	10 June	Successful
10 June	Apogee: 100 kilometres (62 mi)					
12 June; 15:53	(United States) UGM-27 Polaris A2		(United States) Cape Canaveral LC-25A		(United States) US Navy	
12 June; 15:53		US Navy	Suborbital	Missile test	12 June	Successful
12 June; 15:53	Apogee: 1,000 kilometres (620 mi)					
13 June; 05:12	(United States) Javelin		(United States) Wallops Island		(United States) NASA	
13 June; 05:12		NASA	Suborbital	Ionospheric	13 June	Successful
13 June; 05:12	Apogee: 867 kilometres (539 mi)					
15 June; 00:02:59	(United States) Javelin		(United States) Wallops Island		(United States) NASA	
15 June; 00:02:59		DRTE/CRC	Suborbital	Ionospheric	15 June	Successful
15 June; 00:02:59	Apogee: 901 kilometres (560 mi)					
15 June; 05:45	(Soviet Union) R-7A Semyorka		(Soviet Union) Baikonur Site 31/6		(Soviet Union) RVSN	
15 June; 05:45		RVSN	Suborbital	Missile test	15 June	Successful
15 June; 05:45	Apogee: 1,350 kilometres (840 mi)					
15 June	(Soviet Union) R-12 Dvina		(Soviet Union) Kapustin Yar		(Soviet Union) MVS	
15 June		MVS	Suborbital	Missile test	15 June	Successful
15 June	Apogee: 402 kilometres (250 mi)					
16 June; 07:47:23	(Soviet Union) R-16		(Soviet Union) Baikonur Site 41/4		(Soviet Union) RVSN	
16 June; 07:47:23		RVSN	Suborbital	Missile test	16 June	Launch failure
17 June; 07:29	(United States) Aerobee-150 (Hi)		(United States) White Sands LC-35		(United States) NRL	
17 June; 07:29		NRL	Suborbital	Aeronomy	17 June	Successful
17 June; 07:29	Apogee: 197 kilometres (122 mi)					
18 June; 04:35	(Japan) Kappa-4		(Japan) Obachi		(Japan) ISAS	
18 June; 04:35		TOK	Suborbital	Cosmic ray research	18 June	Successful
18 June; 04:35	Apogee: 105 kilometres (65 mi)					
20 June; 23:54	(United States) PGM-17 Thor DM-18A		(United States) Vandenberg LC-75-2-7		(United Kingdom) Royal Air Force	
20 June; 23:54		Royal Air Force	Suborbital	Missile test	20 June	Successful
20 June; 23:54	Apogee: 520 kilometres (320 mi)					
21 June; 14:45	(United States) Aerobee-150 (Hi)		(United States) White Sands LC-35		(United States) NRL	
21 June; 14:45		NRL	Suborbital	Solar	21 June	Successful
21 June; 14:45	Apogee: 271 kilometres (168 mi)					
23 June; 03:00	(United States) SM-65E Atlas		(United States) Cape Canaveral LC-11		(United States) US Air Force	
23 June; 03:00		US Air Force	Suborbital	Missile test	23 June	Launch failure
23 June; 03:00	Apogee: 10 kilometres (6.2 mi), went out of control					
23 June; 15:00	(United States) Nike-Cajun		(United States) Eglin		(United States) US Air Force	
23 June; 15:00		US Air Force	Suborbital	Meteorite research	23 June	Successful
23 June; 15:00	Apogee: 157 kilometres (98 mi)					
23 June; 23:40	(United States) Nike-Zeus		(United States) White Sands LC-38		(United States) US Army	
23 June; 23:40		US Army	Suborbital	Missile test	23 June	Successful
23 June; 23:40	Apogee: 150 kilometres (93 mi)					
24 June; 03:28	(United States) HGM-25A Titan I		(United States) Cape Canaveral LC-19		(United States) US Air Force	
24 June; 03:28		US Air Force	Suborbital	Missile test	24 June	Launch failure
24 June; 03:28	Apogee: 10 kilometres (6.2 mi)					
24 June; 23:17	(United States) Javelin		(United States) Wallops Island		(United States) NASA	
24 June; 23:17		CRPL	Suborbital	Ionospheric	24 June	Successful
24 June; 23:17	Apogee: 1,018 kilometres (633 mi)					
24 June	(Soviet Union) R-12 Dvina		(Soviet Union) Makat		(Soviet Union) OKB-30	
24 June		OKB-30	Suborbital	Target	24 June	Successful
24 June	Apogee: 402 kilometres (250 mi)					
26 June; 15:15	(United States) Aerobee-150A		(United States) Wallops Island		(United States) NASA	
26 June; 15:15		NASA	Suborbital	Test flight	26 June	Successful
26 June; 15:15	Apogee: 187 kilometres (116 mi)					
26 June	(United States) UGM-27 Polaris A2		(United States) USNS Observation Island, ETR		(United States) US Navy	
26 June		US Navy	Suborbital	Missile test	26 June	Launch failure
26 June	Apogee: 500 kilometres (310 mi)					
29 June	(Soviet Union) R-12 Dvina		(Soviet Union) Kapustin Yar		(Soviet Union) MVS	
29 June		MVS	Suborbital	Missile test	29 June	Successful
29 June	Apogee: 402 kilometres (250 mi)					
30 June; 17:20	(United States) Astrobee-200		(United States) Eglin		(United States) US Air Force	
30 June; 17:20		US Air Force	Suborbital	Test flight	30 June	Launch failure
30 June; 17:20	Apogee: 29 kilometres (18 mi)					
30 June	(Soviet Union) R-12 Dvina		(Soviet Union) Makat		(Soviet Union) OKB-30	
30 June		OKB-30	Suborbital	Target	30 June	Successful
30 June	Apogee: 402 kilometres (250 mi)					

- ← Jan
- Feb
- Mar
- Apr
- May
- Jun
- Jul
- Aug
- Sep
- Oct
- Nov
- Dec →
