= Discoverer 5 =

Reconnaissance satellite

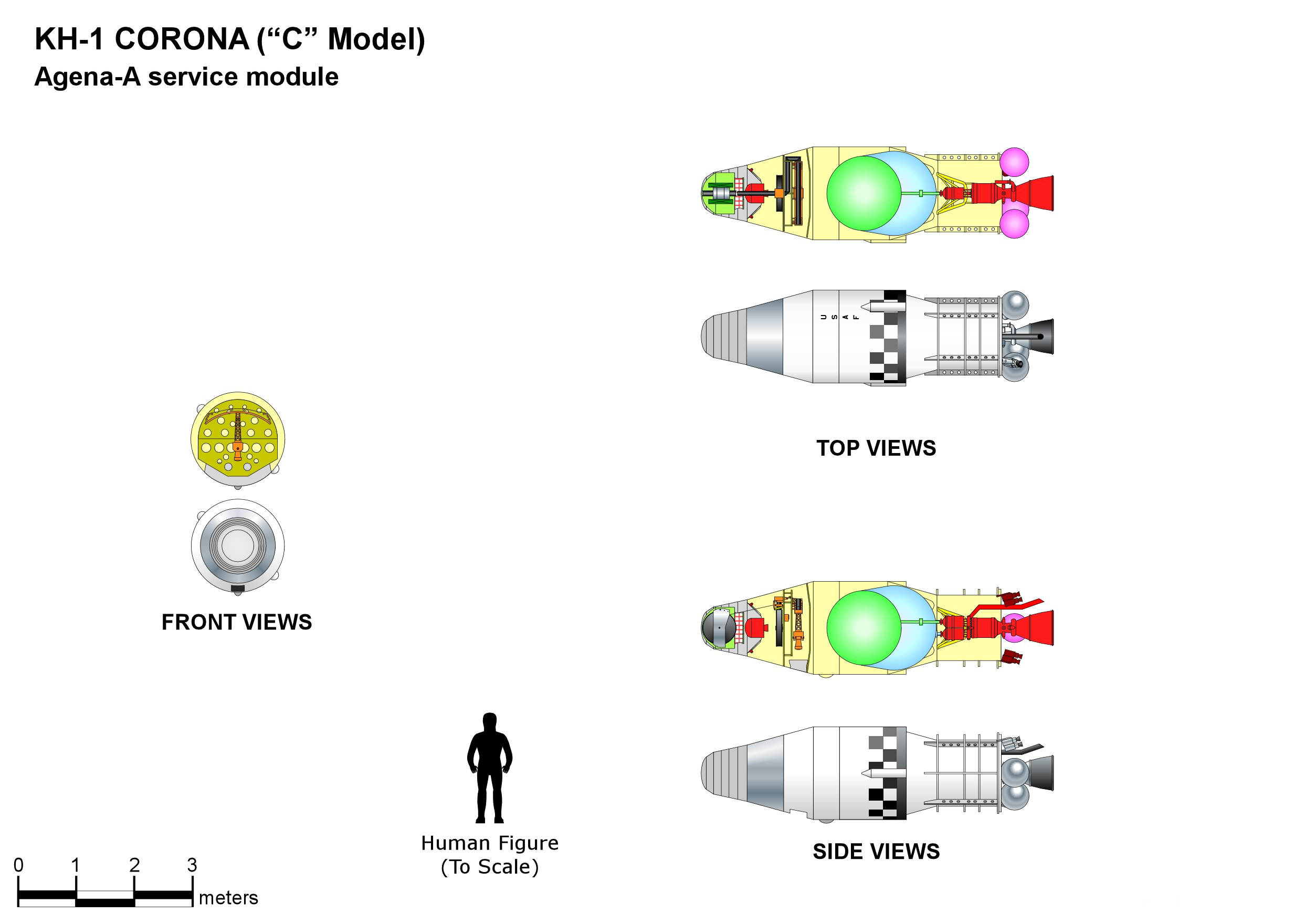
- Mission type: Optical reconnaissance
- Operator: US Air Force / NRO
- Harvard designation: 1959 EPS 1
- COSPAR ID: 1959-005A
- SATCAT no.: S00018
- Mission duration: 1 day

Spacecraft properties
- Spacecraft type: CORONA KH-1
- Bus: Agena-A
- Manufacturer: Lockheed
- Launch mass: 870 kilograms (1,920 lb) after orbit insertion

Start of mission
- Launch date: 13 Aug 1959 19:00:08 GMT
- Rocket: Thor DM-21 Agena-A (Thor 192)
- Launch site: Vandenberg LC 75-3-4

End of mission
- Last contact: 14 August 1959 (SRV)
- Decay date: 28 September 1959 (Agena)

Orbital parameters
- Reference system: Geocentric
- Regime: Low Earth
- Eccentricity: 0.01202
- Perigee altitude: 193 kilometers (120 mi)
- Apogee altitude: 353 kilometers (219 mi)
- Inclination: 80.0°
- Period: 90 minutes
- Epoch: 14 August 1959 21:21:00

Discoverer 5, also known as Corona 9002, was an American optical reconnaissance satellite launched on 13 August 1959 at 19:00:08 GMT, the second of ten operational flights of the Corona KH-1 spy satellite series. Though the satellite was successfully orbited, the onboard camera failed within the first orbit, and the film-return capsule failed to deorbit as planned.

== Background ==
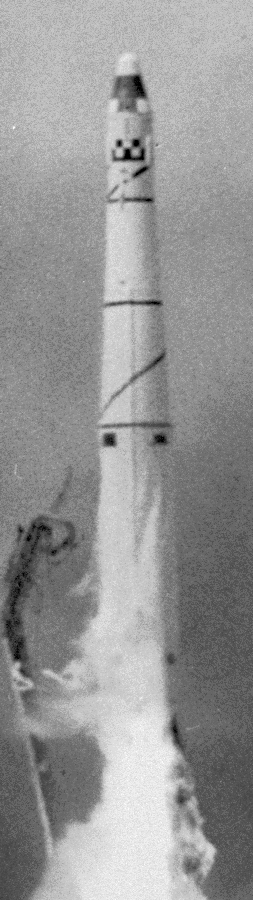
Thor Agena A with Discoverer 5, 13 August 1959

"Discoverer" was the civilian designation and cover for the Corona satellite photo-reconnaissance series of satellites managed by the Advanced Research Projects Agency of the Department of Defense and the U.S. Air Force. The primary goal of the satellites was to replace the U-2 spyplane in surveilling the Sino-Soviet Bloc, determining the disposition and speed of production of Soviet missiles and long-range bombers assess. The Corona program was also used to produce maps and charts for the Department of Defense and other US government mapping programs.

The first series of Corona satellites were the Keyhole 1 (KH-1) satellites based on the Agena-A upper stage, which not only offered housing but whose engine provided attitude control in orbit. The KH-1 payload included the C (for Corona) single, vertical-looking, panoramic camera that scanned back and forth, exposing its film at a right angle to the line of flight. The camera, built by Fairchild Camera and Instrument with a f/5.0 aperture and 61 centimetres (24 in) focal length, had a ground resolution of 12.9 metres (42 ft). Film was returned from orbit by a single General Electric Satellite Return Vehicle (SRV) constructed by General Electric. The SRV was equipped with an onboard small solid-fuel retro motor to deorbit at the end of the mission. Recovery of the capsule was done in mid-air by a specially equipped aircraft.

Discoverer 5 was preceded by Discoverer 4, launched 25 June 1959, and three Discoverer test flights whose satellites carried no cameras, launched in the first half of 1959.

== Spacecraft ==
The battery-powered Discoverer 5 was a cylindrical satellite 1.5 metres (4 ft 11 in) in diameter, 5.85 metres (19.2 ft) long and had a mass after second stage separation, including propellants, of roughly 3,850 kilograms (8,490 lb). After orbital insertion, the satellite and SRV together massed 870 kilograms (1,920 lb). The capsule section of the reentry vehicle was 84 centimetres (33 in) in diameter and 69 centimetres (27 in) long. Like Discoverer 4, Discoverer 5 carried the C camera for its photosurveillance mission.

The capsule was designed to be recovered by a specially equipped aircraft during parachute descent, but was also designed to float to permit recovery from the ocean. The main spacecraft contained a telemetry transmitter and a tracking beacon.

== Mission ==
Discoverer 5 was launched on 13 August 1959 at 19:00:08 GMT from Vandenberg LC 75-3-4 into a 193 kilometres (120 mi) x 353 kilometres (219 mi) polar orbit by a Thor-Agena A booster. Within one orbit, however, the camera had already failed. Telemetry on the ground indicated that the temperature inside the satellite was abnormally low, and that the film had never loaded itself into the camera. It likely had broken on its way out of the supply container. On 14 August, one day after launch, the SRV separated from its satellite bus for recovery. The capsule's retrorocket propelled the SRV up to a higher orbit with an apogee of 1,703 kilometres (1,058 mi) rather than deorbiting it, and no signals were received from the capsule, presumably due to a telemetry sequencing problem. The satellite bus reentered on 28 October 1959. The Discoverer 5 capsule (COSPAR 1959-005B, SATCAT 26) decayed from orbit on 11 February 1961.

== Legacy ==
CORONA achieved its first fully successful flight with the mission of Discoverer 14, launched on August 18, 1960. The program ultimately comprised 145 flights in eight satellite series, the last mission launching on 25 May 1972. CORONA was declassified in 1995, and a formal acknowledgement of the existence of US reconnaissance programs, past and present, was issued in September 1996.
