= Discoverer 12 =

Reconnaissance satellite

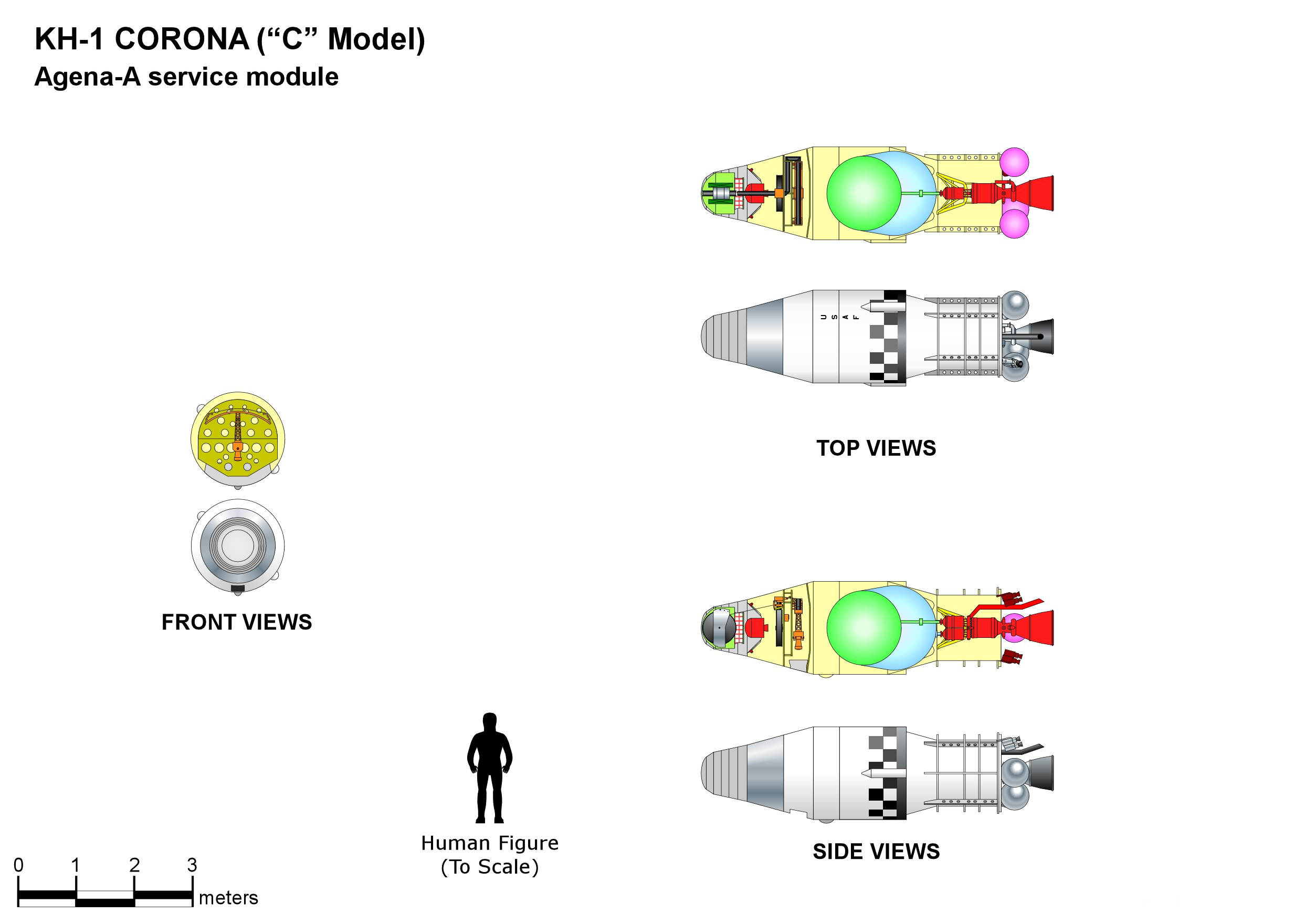
- Mission type: Optical reconnaissance
- Operator: US Air Force / NRO
- Harvard designation: 1960-F08
- SATCAT no.: F00104

Spacecraft properties
- Spacecraft type: CORONA KH-1
- Bus: Agena-A
- Manufacturer: Lockheed
- Launch mass: 790 kilograms (1,740 lb)

Start of mission
- Launch date: 29 Jun 1960 22:00:44 GMT
- Rocket: Thor DM-21 Agena-A (Thor 160)
- Launch site: Vandenberg LC 75-3-4

End of mission
- Decay date: 29 Jun

Discoverer 12 was an American optical reconnaissance satellite launched on 29 June 1960, at 22:00:44 GMT. The fourth of five test flights of the Corona KH-1 spy satellite series was lost when the second stage failed during launch.

== Background ==
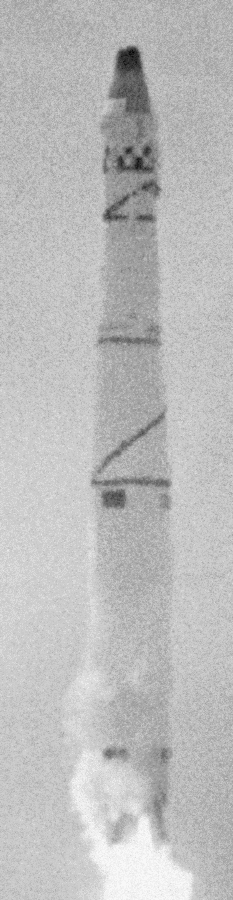
Thor Agena A with Discoverer 12, 29 June 1960

"Discoverer" was the civilian designation and cover for the Corona satellite photo-reconnaissance series of satellites managed by the Advanced Research Projects Agency of the Department of Defense and the U.S. Air Force. The primary goal of the satellites was to replace the U-2 spyplane in surveilling the Sino-Soviet bloc, determining the disposition and speed of production of Soviet missiles, and assessing long-range bombers. The Corona program was also used to produce maps and charts for the Department of Defense and other US government mapping programs.

The first series of Corona satellites were the Keyhole 1 (KH-1) satellites based on the Agena-A upper stage, which not only offered housing but whose engine provided attitude control in orbit. The KH-1 payload included the C (for Corona) single, vertical-looking, panoramic camera that scanned back and forth, exposing its film at a right angle to the line of flight. The camera, built by Fairchild Camera and Instrument with a f/5.0 aperture and 61 centimetres (24 in) focal length, had a ground resolution of 12.9 metres (42 ft). Film was returned from orbit by a single General Electric Satellite Return Vehicle (SRV) constructed by General Electric. The SRV was equipped with an onboard small solid-fuel retromotor to deorbit at the end of the mission. Recovery of the capsule was done in mid-air by a specially equipped aircraft.

The Discoverer program began with a series of three test flights whose satellites carried no cameras, all launched in the first half of 1959. There followed eight operational Discoverer satellites, all of them partial or complete failures, though Discoverer 11, launched on 15 April 1960, carrying a new vacuum-resistant film, was the first mission on which the onboard camera worked properly. After the failure of Discoverer 11 on reentry, caused by the explosion of its spin motor, it was decided that the following mission would be a diagnostic flight to determine the causes of the various issues plaguing the program.

== Spacecraft ==
The battery-powered satellite, like prior Discoverers, was housed in an Agena-A stage and composed of a satellite bus and SRV. Discoverer 12 was largely identical to Discoverer 8; however, instead of mounting the "C" (for Corona) surveillance camera, the SRV contained extra telemetry. The SRV included a doppler beacon and external lights for tracking purposes. The combination of bus and SRV weighted 781 kilograms (1,722 lb), with the SRV alone weighing 136 kilograms (300 lb) Discoverer 12 also carried a newly developed gas motor for spin stabilization to replace the system that had caused the loss of Discoverer 11.

== Mission ==
Launch took place 29 Jun 1960 at 22:00:44 GMT from Vandenberg LC 75-3-4 by a Thor DM-21 Agena-A rocket. Booster performance was normal through the Thor burn. After staging and Agena ignition, a malfunction of the horizon sensor caused the Agena to point six degrees downward of where it should have been and as a result it fell into the Pacific Ocean instead of attaining orbit.

== Legacy ==
Though Discoverer 12 was a loss, Corona engineers had confidence in the new spin motor as well as the previously demonstrated film. In fact, the following test mission, Discoverer 13, was a complete success and paved the way for the first fully successful flight, Discoverer 14, launched on August 18, 1960. The Corona program went on to comprise 145 flights in eight satellite series, the last mission launching on 25 May 1972. CORONA was declassified in 1995, and a formal acknowledgement of the existence of US reconnaissance programs, past and present, was issued in September 1996.
