= Discoverer 27 =

- Mission type: Optical reconnaissance
- Operator: US Air Force/NRO
- Mission duration: Failed to orbit

Spacecraft properties
- Spacecraft type: KH-5 Argon
- Bus: Agena-B
- Manufacturer: Lockheed
- Launch mass: 1,150 kilograms (2,540 lb)

Start of mission
- Launch date: 21 July 1961, 22:35 UTC
- Rocket: Thor DM-21 Agena-B 322
- Launch site: Vandenberg LC-75-3-4

Orbital parameters
- Reference system: Geocentric
- Regime: Low Earth
- Epoch: Planned

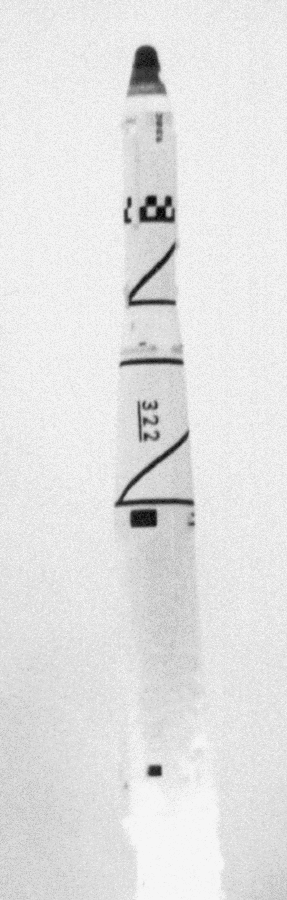
The launch of Discoverer 27

Discoverer 27, also known as Corona 9020A, was an American area survey optical reconnaissance satellite launched in 1961, but which failed to achieve orbit. It was a KH-5 Argon satellite, based on an Agena-B. It was the fourth KH-5 to be launched, the second consecutive KH-5 launch failure, and the fourth consecutive KH-5 mission failure.

The launch of Discoverer 27 occurred at 22:35 UTC on 21 July 1961. A Thor DM-21 Agena-B rocket was used, flying from Launch Complex 75-3-4 at the Vandenberg Air Force Base. The booster began exhibiting abnormal pitch gyrations within seconds of liftoff, which worsened during flight and eventually exceeded its design limits. At T+59 seconds, the Agena disintegrated due to either structural loads or inadvertent activation of the range safety destruct charges. The Thor's engine shut down due to loss of electrical power caused by damage to the forward section of the vehicle. Twenty seconds later, the Thor exploded and all telemetry data ceased, although the telemetry transmitter continued operating until 300 seconds after launch, likely at the point where water impact occurred. Range Safety issued the destruct command at T+94 seconds, but only as a formality and there was no indication that it did anything.

The failure was traced to an open circuit in the guidance programmer.

Discoverer 27 was designed to operate in a low Earth orbit, and had a mass of 1,150 kilograms (2,540 lb). It was equipped with a frame camera with a focal length of 76 millimetres (3.0 in), which had a maximum resolution of 140 metres (460 ft). The camera would have recorded images onto 127-millimeter (5.0 in) film, which would have been returned in a Satellite Recovery Vehicle, before the satellite ceased operations. The Satellite Recovery Vehicle carried by Discoverer 27 was SRV-524.
