= Discoverer 21 =

Reconnaissance satellite

- Mission type: Technology
- Operator: US Air Force/ARPA
- Harvard designation: 1961 Zeta 1
- COSPAR ID: 1961-006A
- SATCAT no.: 00084

Spacecraft properties
- Bus: Agena-B
- Manufacturer: Lockheed
- Launch mass: 1,110 kilograms (2,450 lb)

Start of mission
- Launch date: 18 February 1961, 22:58 UTC
- Rocket: Thor DM-21 Agena-B 261
- Launch site: Vandenberg LC-1 launch pad 75-3-5

End of mission
- Decay date: 20 April 1962

Orbital parameters
- Reference system: Geocentric
- Regime: Low Earth
- Perigee altitude: 243 kilometers (151 mi)
- Apogee altitude: 1,026 kilometers (638 mi)
- Inclination: 80.7 degrees
- Period: 97.4 minutes

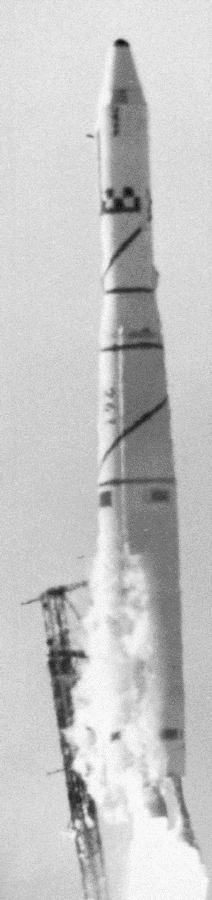
The launch of Discoverer 21

Discoverer 21, also known as RM-2, was an American satellite which was launched in 1961. It was a technology demonstration spacecraft, based on an Agena-B.

The launch of Discoverer 21 occurred at 22:58 UTC on 18 February 1961. A Thor DM-21 Agena-B rocket was used, flying from launch pad 75-3-5 at the Vandenberg Air Force Base. Upon successfully reaching orbit, it was assigned the Harvard designation 1961 Zeta 1.

Discoverer 21 was operated in a low Earth orbit, with a perigee of 243 kilometres (151 mi), an apogee of 1,026 kilometres (638 mi), 80.7 degrees of inclination, and a period of 97.4 minutes. The satellite had a mass of 1,110 kilograms (2,450 lb), and was used to demonstrate an engine restart, and to test infrared sensors for the Midas programme. It remained in orbit until 20 April 1962, when it decayed and reentered the atmosphere.
