= Samos 2 =

- Mission type: Reconnaissance
- Operator: United States Air Force
- Harvard designation: 1961 Alpha 1
- COSPAR ID: 1961-001A
- SATCAT no.: 00070
- Mission duration: 1 month

Spacecraft properties
- Spacecraft type: Samos-E1
- Bus: Agena-A

Start of mission
- Launch date: January 31, 1961, 20:31:19 UTC
- Rocket: Atlas LV-3A Agena-A 70D
- Launch site: Point Arguello LC-1-1

End of mission
- Decay date: October 21, 1973

Orbital parameters
- Reference system: Geocentric
- Regime: Sun-synchronous Low Earth
- Perigee altitude: 474 kilometers (295 mi)
- Apogee altitude: 553 kilometers (344 mi)
- Inclination: 97.4 degrees
- Period: 94.9 minutes

Samos 2 was an American reconnaissance satellite launched in 1961 as part of the Samos program. It was an early electro-optical reconnaissance spacecraft, meaning that it transmitted images to receiving stations on Earth rather than returning them in a film capsule. Samos 2 was a Samos-E1 spacecraft, based on an Agena-A.

The launch of Samos 2 occurred at 20:31:19 UTC on January 31, 1961. An Atlas LV-3A Agena-A rocket was used, flying from Launch Complex 1-1 at the Point Arguello Naval Air Station. Ten minutes and fourteen seconds later, the Agena's engine cut off, having successfully achieved a low Earth orbit. It was assigned the Harvard designation 1961 Alpha 1.

Samos 2 operated in a Sun-synchronous low Earth orbit, with an apogee of 553 kilometres (344 mi), a perigee of 474 kilometres (295 mi), an inclination of 97.4 degrees, and a period of 94.9 minutes. The satellite had a mass of 1,915 kilograms (4,222 lb), and measured 6.86 metres (22.5 ft) in length, with a diameter of 1.52 metres (5 ft 0 in). It operated successfully, but the images returned were poor. Designed to operate for around ten days, it ceased operations around a month after launch, and decayed from orbit on October 21, 1973.
