= Explorer S-45 (satellite) =

NASA satellite of the Explorer program

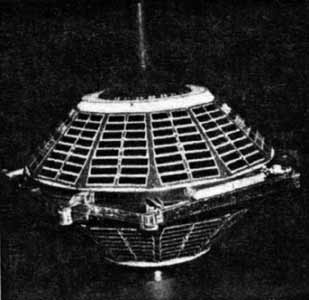
- Explorer S-45 satellite before launch
- Names: Explorer S-45; NASA S-45
- Mission type: Ionospheric research
- Operator: NASA
- COSPAR ID: EXS-451
- Mission duration: Failed to orbit

Spacecraft properties
- Spacecraft: Explorer S-45
- Spacecraft type: Science Explorer
- Bus: S-45
- Manufacturer: Goddard Space Flight Center
- Launch mass: 33.6 kg (74 lb)
- Power: Solar cells and batteries

Start of mission
- Launch date: 25 February 1961, 00:13:16 GMT
- Rocket: Juno II (AM-19F)
- Launch site: Cape Canaveral, LC-26B
- Contractor: Army Ballistic Missile Agency

End of mission
- Destroyed: Failed to orbit

Orbital parameters
- Reference system: Geocentric orbit (planned)
- Regime: Highly elliptical orbit
- Perigee altitude: 221 km (137 mi)
- Apogee altitude: 181,100 km (112,500 mi)
- Inclination: 33.0°
- Period: 5013.90 minutes

Instruments
- Beacon

Explorer S-45 was a NASA satellite, which was lost in a launch failure in February 1961. The satellite was intended to operate in a highly elliptical orbit, from which it was to have provided data on the shape of the ionosphere, and on the Earth's magnetic field. It was part of the Explorer program, and would have been designated Explorer 10 had it reached orbit. A second identical satellite, Explorer S-45A, also failed to achieve orbit when it was launched.

== Launch ==
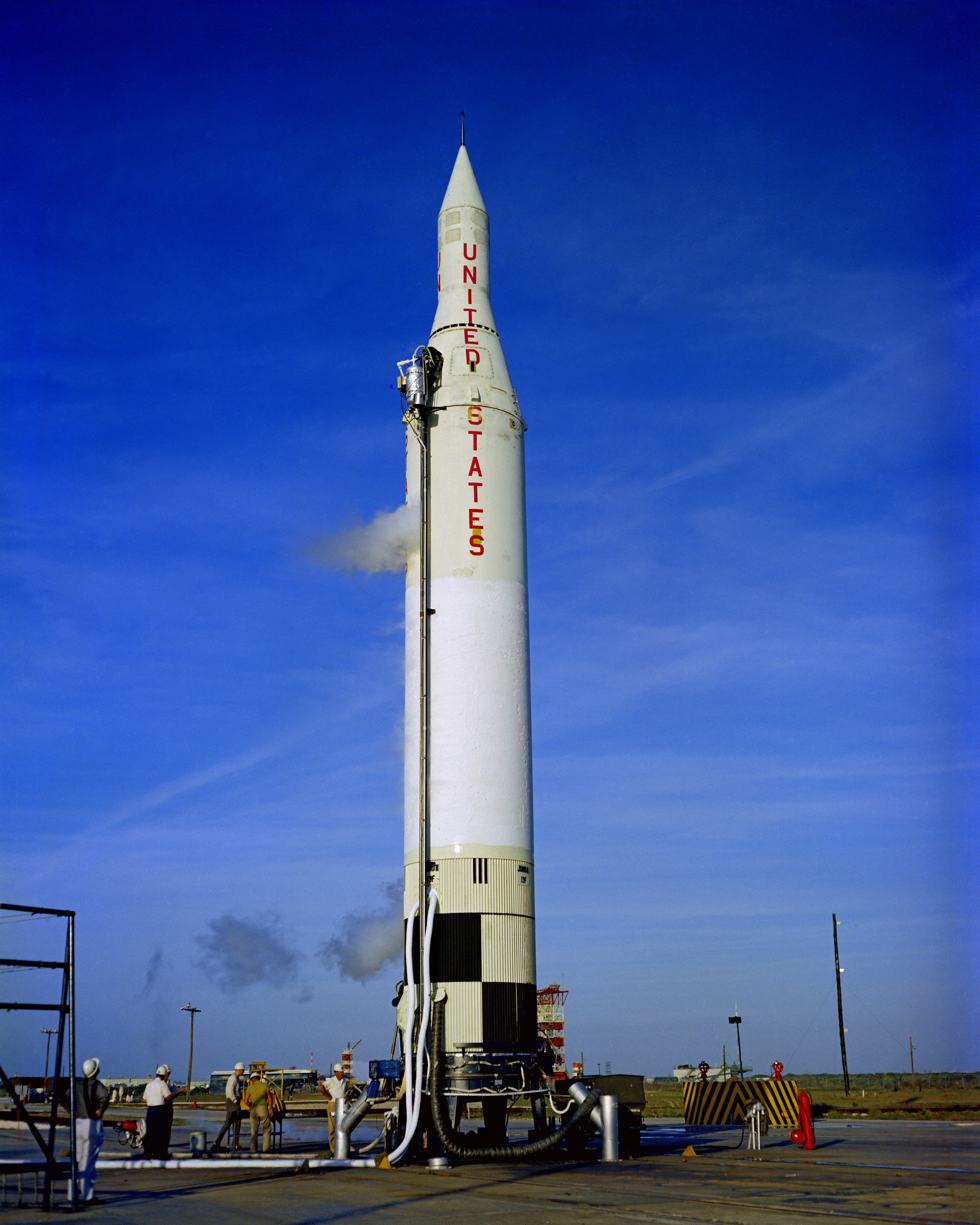
JUNO II with Explorer S-45 on launch table after gantry pulled back

Explorer S-45 was launched aboard a Juno II launch vehicle, serial number AM-19F. The launch took place from Launch Complex 26B at the Cape Canaveral Air Force Station (CCAFS) at 00:13:16 GMT on 25 February 1961. The launch vehicle malfunctioned after the second stage separated, and contact with the payload was lost. The third stages subsequently failed to ignite, resulting in the satellite failing to achieve orbit.

== See also ==
- Explorer S-45A
- Explorer program
