= Explorer S-45A (satellite) =

American ionosphere research satellite

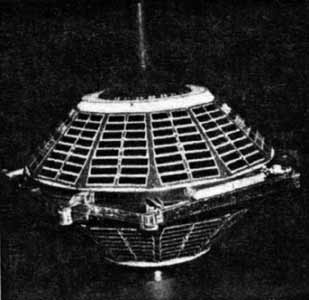
- Explorer S-45A satellite before launch
- Names: S-45A; NASA S-45A
- Mission type: Ionosphere research
- Operator: NASA
- COSPAR ID: EXS-451
- Mission duration: Failed to orbit

Spacecraft properties
- Spacecraft: Explorer S-45A
- Spacecraft type: Science Explorer
- Bus: S-45
- Manufacturer: Goddard Space Flight Center
- Launch mass: 33.6 kg (74 lb)
- Power: Solar cells and batteries

Start of mission
- Launch date: 24 May 1961, 19:48:05 GMT
- Rocket: Juno II (AM-19G)
- Launch site: Cape Canaveral, LC-26B
- Contractor: Army Ballistic Missile Agency

End of mission
- Destroyed: Failed to orbit

Orbital parameters
- Reference system: Geocentric orbit (planned)
- Regime: Highly elliptical orbit
- Perigee altitude: 221 km (137 mi)
- Apogee altitude: 181,100 km (112,500 mi)
- Inclination: 33.0°
- Period: 5013.90 minutes

Instruments
- Beacon

Explorer S-45A was a NASA satellite, which was lost in a launch failure in 1961. The satellite was intended to operate in a highly elliptical orbit, from which it was to have provided data on the shape of the ionosphere, and on the Earth's magnetic field. It was part of the Explorer program and would have been designated Explorer 12 had it reached orbit. It was the second of two identical satellites to be launched; the first, Explorer S-45, had also been lost in a launch failure, earlier in the year.

== Launch ==
Explorer S-45A was launched aboard a Juno II launch vehicle, serial number AM-19G. It was the final flight of the Juno II. The launch took place from LC-26B at the Cape Canaveral Air Force Station (CCAFS) at 19:48:05 GMT on 24 May 1961. The system which was intended to ignite the second stage malfunctioned, and as a result that stage failed to ignite. The launch vehicle failed to achieve orbit.
