= Discoverer 23 =

- Mission type: Photographic reconnaissance
- Operator: US Air Force / NRO
- Harvard designation: 1961 Lambda 1
- COSPAR ID: 1961-011A
- SATCAT no.: 00100

Spacecraft properties
- Spacecraft type: KH-5 ARGON
- Bus: Agena-B
- Manufacturer: Lockheed Corporation
- Launch mass: 1150 kg

Start of mission
- Launch date: 8 April 1961, 19:21:08 GMT
- Rocket: Thor DM-21 Agena-B (Thor 307)
- Launch site: Vandenberg, SLC-1E; Launch pad 75-3-5

End of mission
- Decay date: 16 April 1962

Orbital parameters
- Reference system: Geocentric
- Regime: Low Earth
- Perigee altitude: 294 km
- Apogee altitude: 624 km
- Inclination: 82.3°
- Period: 93.77 minutes

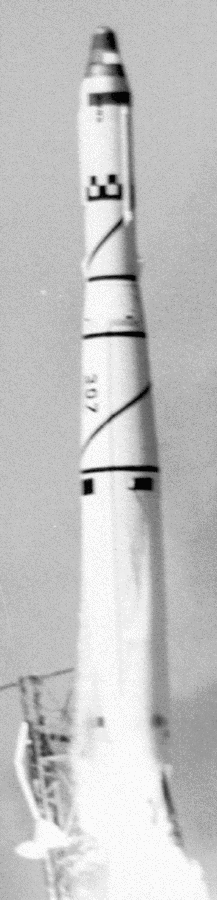
The launch of Discoverer 23.

Discoverer 23, also known as KH-5 9016A, was a USAF photographic reconnaissance satellite under the supervision of the National Reconnaissance Office (NRO) which was launched in 1961. It was a KH-5 ARGON satellite, based on an Agena-B. It was the second KH-5 mission to be launched, and the second to end in failure.

== Launch ==
The launch of Discoverer 23 occurred at 19:21:08 GMT on 8 April 1961. A Thor DM-21 Agena-B rocket was used, flying from launch pad 75-3-5 at the Vandenberg Air Force Base. Upon successfully reaching orbit, it was assigned the Harvard designation 1961 Lambda 1.

== Mission ==
Discoverer 23 was operated in an Earth orbit, with a perigee of 294 kilometres (183 mi), an apogee of 624 kilometres (388 mi), 82.3° of inclination, and a period of 93.77 minutes. The satellite had a mass of 1,150 kilograms (2,540 lb), and was equipped with a frame camera with a focal length of 76 millimetres (3.0 in), which had a maximum resolution of 140 metres (460 ft). Images were recorded onto 127 millimetres (5.0 in) film, and ejected aboard a Satellite Return Vehicle, SRV-521. Due to a problem with Discoverer 23's attitude control system, the SRV ended up boosting itself into a higher orbit rather than deorbiting. Discoverer 23 decayed from orbit on 16 April 1962, followed by the SRV on 23 May 1962.·
