= Discoverer 25 =

Reconnaissance satellite

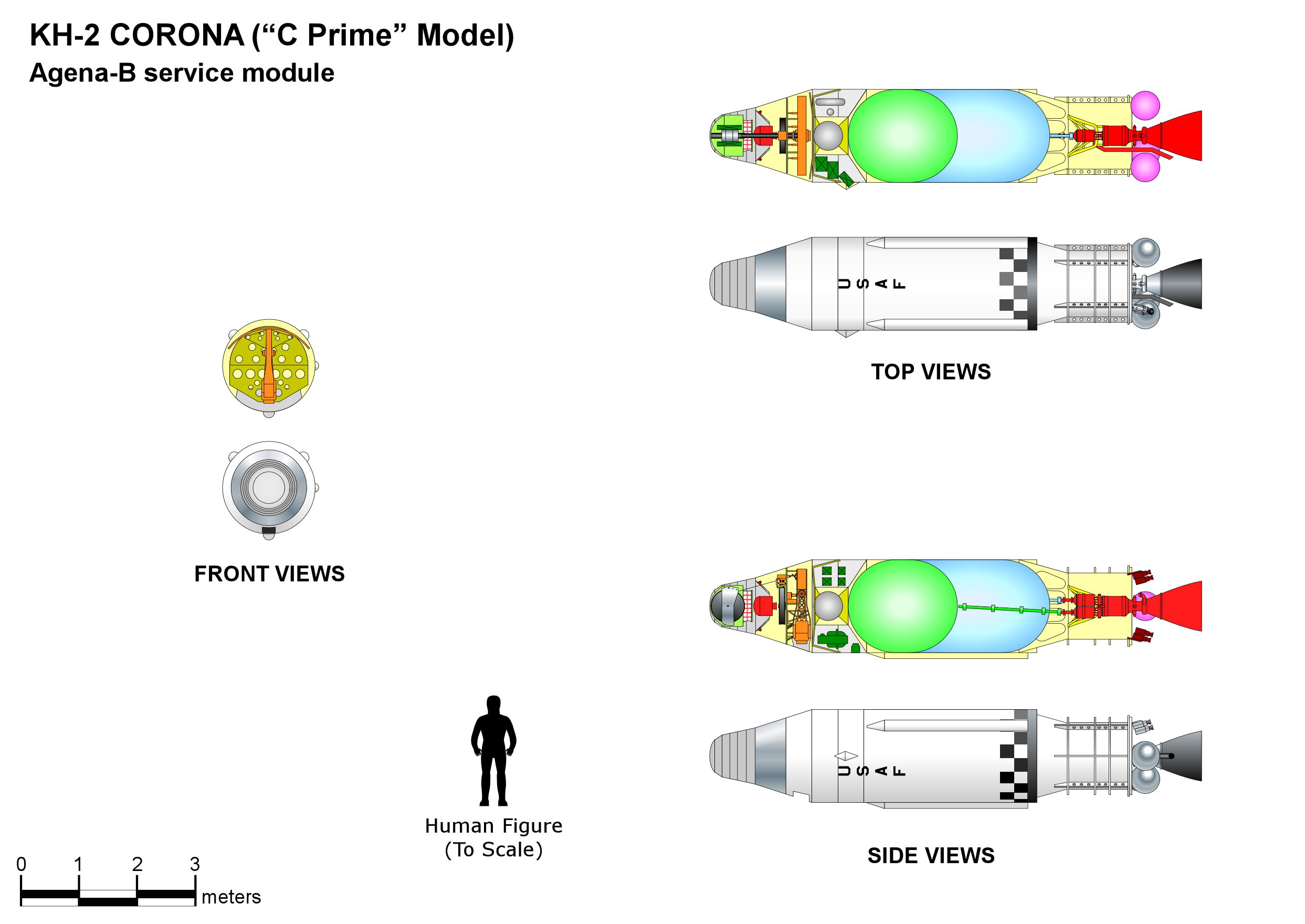
- Mission type: Optical reconnaissance
- Operator: US Air Force/NRO
- Harvard designation: 1961 Xi 1
- COSPAR ID: 1961-014A
- SATCAT no.: 00108
- Mission duration: 2 days

Spacecraft properties
- Spacecraft type: Corona KH-2
- Bus: Agena-B
- Manufacturer: Lockheed
- Launch mass: 1,150 kilograms (2,540 lb)

Start of mission
- Launch date: 16 June 1961, 23:02:52 UTC
- Rocket: Thor DM-21 Agena-B 303
- Launch site: Vandenberg LC-75-1-1

End of mission
- Decay date: 12 July 1961

Orbital parameters
- Reference system: Geocentric
- Regime: Low Earth
- Perigee altitude: 223 kilometers (139 mi)
- Apogee altitude: 361 kilometers (224 mi)
- Inclination: 82.1 degrees
- Period: 90.4 minutes

Discoverer 25, also known as Corona 9017, was an American optical reconnaissance satellite which was launched in 1961. It was the fifth of ten Corona KH-2 satellites, based on the Agena-B.

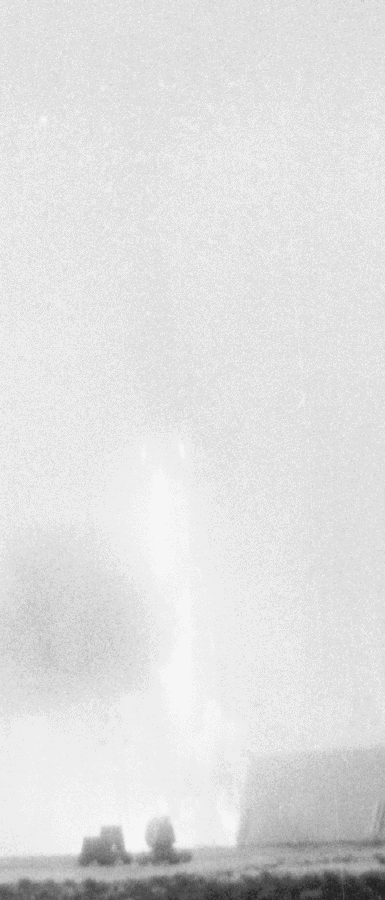
Thor-Agena B with Discoverer 25

The launch of Discoverer 25 occurred at 23:02 UTC on 16 June 1961. A Thor DM-21 Agena-B rocket was used, flying from Launch Complex 75-1-1 at the Vandenberg Air Force Base. Upon successfully reaching orbit, it was assigned the Harvard designation 1961 Xi 1.

Discoverer 25 was operated in a low Earth orbit, with a perigee of 223 kilometres (139 mi), an apogee of 361 kilometres (224 mi), 82.1 degrees of inclination, and a period of 90.4 minutes. The satellite had a mass of 1,150 kilograms (2,540 lb), and was equipped with a panoramic camera with a focal length of 61 centimetres (24 in), which had a maximum resolution of 7.6 metres (25 ft). Images were recorded onto 70-millimeter (2.8 in) film, and returned in a Satellite Recovery Vehicle two days after launch. The Satellite Recovery Vehicle used by Discoverer 25 was SRV-510. Once its images had been returned, Discoverer 25's mission was complete, and it remained in orbit until it decayed on 12 July 1961.

The Satellite Recovery Vehicle was designed to be recovered in mid-air by a Fairchild C-119J Flying Boxcar aircraft. As SRV-510 descended, the C-119J was unable to capture it, and the capsule had to be recovered at sea after it landed. The film it returned was affected by streaks across images.
