= Discoverer 24 =

American reconnaissance satellite

- Mission type: Optical reconnaissance
- Operator: US Air Force/NRO
- Mission duration: Failed to orbit

Spacecraft properties
- Spacecraft type: KH-5 Argon
- Bus: Agena-B
- Manufacturer: Lockheed
- Launch mass: 1,150 kilograms (2,540 lb)

Start of mission
- Launch date: 8 June 1961, 21:16 UTC
- Rocket: Thor DM-21 Agena-B 302
- Launch site: Vandenberg LC-1 launch pad 75-3-4

Orbital parameters
- Reference system: Geocentric
- Regime: Low Earth
- Epoch: Planned

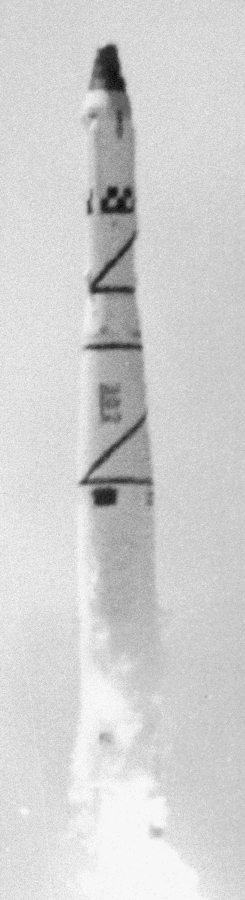
The launch of Discoverer 24

Discoverer 24, also known as Corona 9018A, was an American area survey optical reconnaissance satellite which was launched in 1961 but failed to achieve orbit. It was a KH-5 Argon satellite, based on an Agena-B. It was the third KH-5 to be launched.

The launch of Discoverer 24 occurred at 21:16 UTC on 8 June 1961. A Thor DM-21 Agena-B rocket was used, flying from launch pad 75-3-4 at the Vandenberg Air Force Base. Thor performance was normal and cutoff and staging occurred on time, but the Agena suffered a massive power supply failure during ascent. Since the power failure had caused loss of Agena telemetry data, it was unclear exactly what happened following staging or if engine start ever occurred. Radar tracking indicated that the stage was on a ballistic trajectory and tumbling. It impacted the Pacific Ocean some 400 miles downrange.

Discoverer 24 was to have operated in a low Earth orbit. It had a mass of 1,150 kilograms (2,540 lb), and was equipped with a frame camera with a focal length of 76 millimetres (3.0 in), which had a maximum resolution of 140 metres (460 ft). Images would have been recorded onto 127-millimeter (5.0 in) film, and returned in a Satellite Recovery Vehicle, before the satellite ceased operations. The Satellite Recovery Vehicle carried aboard Discoverer 24 was SRV-541.
