= Obachi =

Rocket launch site in Aomori, Japan

Obachi (尾駮) was a launch site for meteorological rockets and rockoons in Rokkasho, Aomori, Japan.
