= Discoverer 20 =

Reconnaissance satellite

- Mission type: Photographic reconnaissance
- Operator: US Air Force / NRO
- Harvard designation: 1961 Epsilon 1
- COSPAR ID: 1961-005A
- SATCAT no.: 00083

Spacecraft properties
- Spacecraft type: KH-5 ARGON
- Bus: Agena-B
- Manufacturer: Lockheed
- Launch mass: 1110 kg

Start of mission
- Launch date: 17 February 1961, 20:24:00 GMT
- Rocket: Thor DM-21 Agena-B (Thor 298)
- Launch site: Vandenberg, SLC-1; Launch pad 75-3-4

End of mission
- Decay date: 28 July 1962

Orbital parameters
- Reference system: Geocentric
- Regime: Low Earth
- Perigee altitude: 288 km
- Apogee altitude: 786 km
- Inclination: 80.91°
- Period: 95.81 minutes

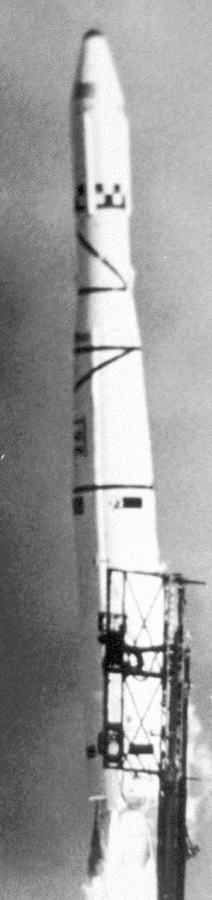
The launch of Discoverer 20.

Discoverer 20, also known as KH-5 9014A, was a USAF photographic reconnaissance satellite under the supervision of the National Reconnaissance Office (NRO) which was launched in 1961. Discoverer 20 was the first KH-5 ARGON satellite to be launched.

== Launch ==
The launch of Discoverer 20 occurred at 20:24:00 GMT on 17 February 1961. A Thor DM-21 Agena-B rocket was used, flying from launch pad 75-3-4 at the Vandenberg Air Force Base. Upon successfully reaching orbit, it was assigned the Harvard designation 1961 Epsilon 1. Discoverer 20 was operated in a low Earth orbit, with a perigee of 283 kilometres (176 mi), an apogee of 770 kilometres (480 mi), 80.91° of inclination, and a period of 95.81 minutes. The satellite was equipped with a frame camera with a focal length of 76 millimetres (3.0 in), which had a maximum resolution of 140 metres (460 ft). Images were recorded onto 127 millimetres (5.0 in) film, and were to have been returned in a Satellite Recovery Vehicle (SRV) before the satellite ceased operations.

== Mission ==
Discoverer 20 was placed in a near-polar orbit to continue evaluation of the Agena-B system, with particular emphasis on the spacecraft's stabilization system in order to overcome instability problems encountered on the previous DISCOVERER and to attempt ejection, deceleration, reentry through the atmosphere, and recovery of an instrument package. The satellite's scientific experiment package of radiation dosimeters, infrared radiometers, and microwave band detectors was identical to that of Discoverer 18 (launched 7 December 1960). Also included were the necessary telemetry and a 136 kilograms (300 lb) reentry capsule. The capsule was a bowl-shaped configuration 83.8 centimetres (33.0 in) in diameter and 68.6 centimetres (27.0 in) in deep. A conical afterbody increased the total length to about 101.6 centimetres (40.0 in). The recovery capsule payload included photographic film packs, nuclear track plates, and biological specimens. In addition to the external lights for optical tracking, the satellite carried a precision tracking experiment. The total package weighed 1,110 kg (2,450 lb). Recovery of the capsule was not attempted due to a system malfunction, and thus the scientific experiment data obtained were limited. Discoverer 20 decayed from orbit on 28 July 1962.
