= STARAD =

United States radiation-monitoring satellite

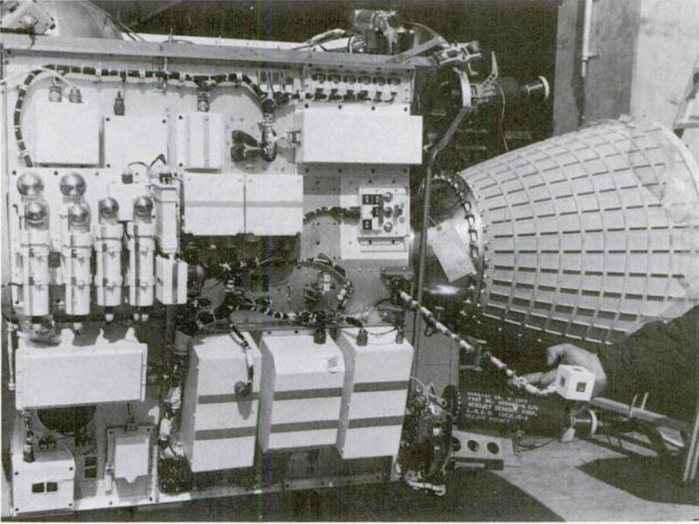
- COSPAR ID: 1962-058A
- SATCAT no.: 00444

Spacecraft properties
- Manufacturer: Air Force Cambridge Research Lab

Start of mission
- Launch date: 26 October 1962
- Rocket: Thor Augmented Delta-Agena D

End of mission
- Last contact: 18 January 1963
- Decay date: 5 October 1967

STARAD (STARfish RADiation) was a radiation-monitoring satellite used to track the artificial radiation belt created by the Starfish Prime high-altitude nuclear test.

== Background ==
On 9 July 1962, decay of debris the Starfish Prime nuclear test utccreated an unexpected increase in high-energy particles in the Earth's magnetic field. Scientists were not sure how long the radiation and its effects would last. The Air Force Cambridge Research Laboratory was asked to design and build STARAD to study the radiation.

== Build and launch ==
The STARAD vehicle was designed and built in sixty days and was launched from Vandenberg Air Force Base on 26 October 1962. It was equipped with nine radiation-measuring instruments.

== Results ==
The STARAD data showed that the radiation from the Starfish test was decaying much slower than expected and that there was little decrease in radiation after the satellite's launch. It also detected radiation from two Soviet nuclear tests conducted after its launch. The satellite's spin allowed scientists to measure Pitch angle distributions.

The satellite's existence was kept secret for some time, as were the conclusions that the artificial radiation belt could last ten years or longer. The unfavorable conclusions worsened existing criticism of the Starfish test among the scientific community.
