= Discoverer 22 =

Reconnaissance satellite

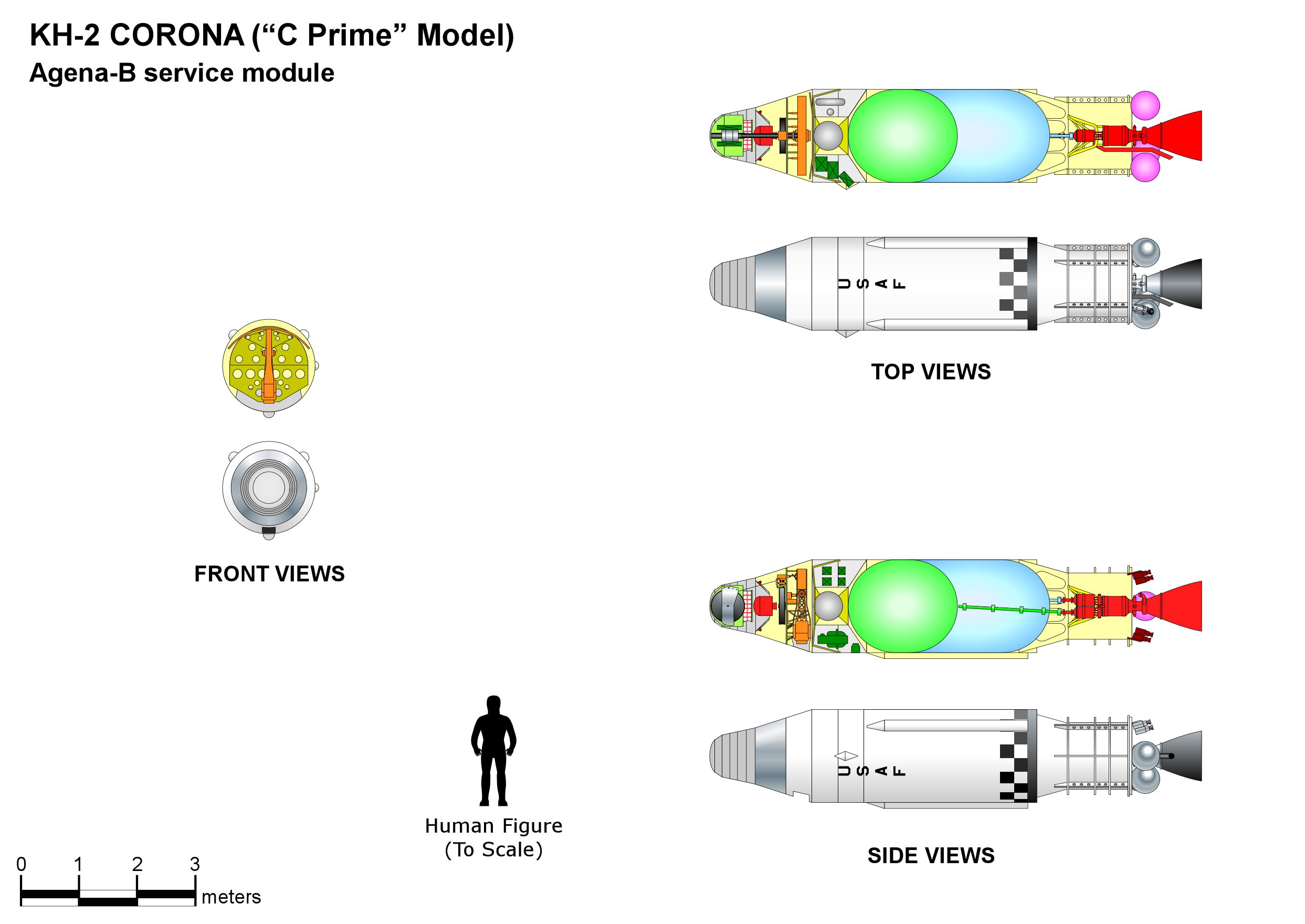
- Mission type: Optical reconnaissance
- Operator: US Air Force/NRO
- Mission duration: Failed to orbit

Spacecraft properties
- Spacecraft type: Corona KH-2
- Bus: Agena-B
- Manufacturer: Lockheed
- Launch mass: 1,150 kilograms (2,540 lb)

Start of mission
- Launch date: 30 March 1961, 20:34:43 UTC
- Rocket: Thor DM-21 Agena-B 300
- Launch site: Vandenberg LC-1 launch pad 75-3-4

Orbital parameters
- Reference system: Geocentric
- Regime: Low Earth
- Epoch: Planned

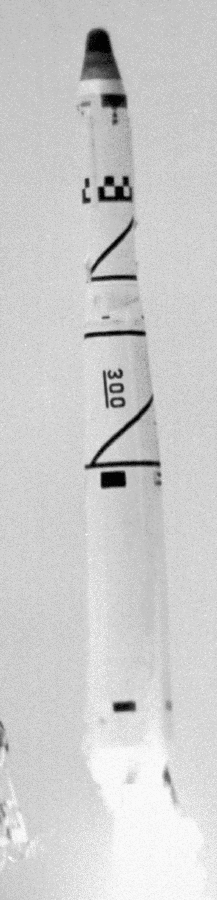
The launch of Discoverer 22

Discoverer 22, also known as Corona 9015, was an American optical reconnaissance satellite which was lost in a launch failure in 1961. It was the fourth of ten Corona KH-2 satellites, based on the Agena-B.

The launch of Discoverer 22 occurred at 20:34:43 UTC on 30 March 1961. A Thor DM-21 Agena-B rocket was used, flying from launch pad 75-3-4 at the Vandenberg Air Force Base. Due to a malfunction of the rocket's second stage, it failed to achieve orbit.

Discoverer 22 was to have operated in a low Earth orbit. It had a mass of 1,150 kilograms (2,540 lb), and was equipped with a panoramic camera with a focal length of 61 centimetres (24 in), which had a maximum resolution of 7.6 metres (25 ft). Images were to have been recorded onto 70-millimeter (2.8 in) film, and returned in a Satellite Recovery Vehicle. The Satellite Recovery Vehicle carried aboard Discoverer 22 was SRV-509.
