= Thor-Agena =

Launch vehicle developed in United States

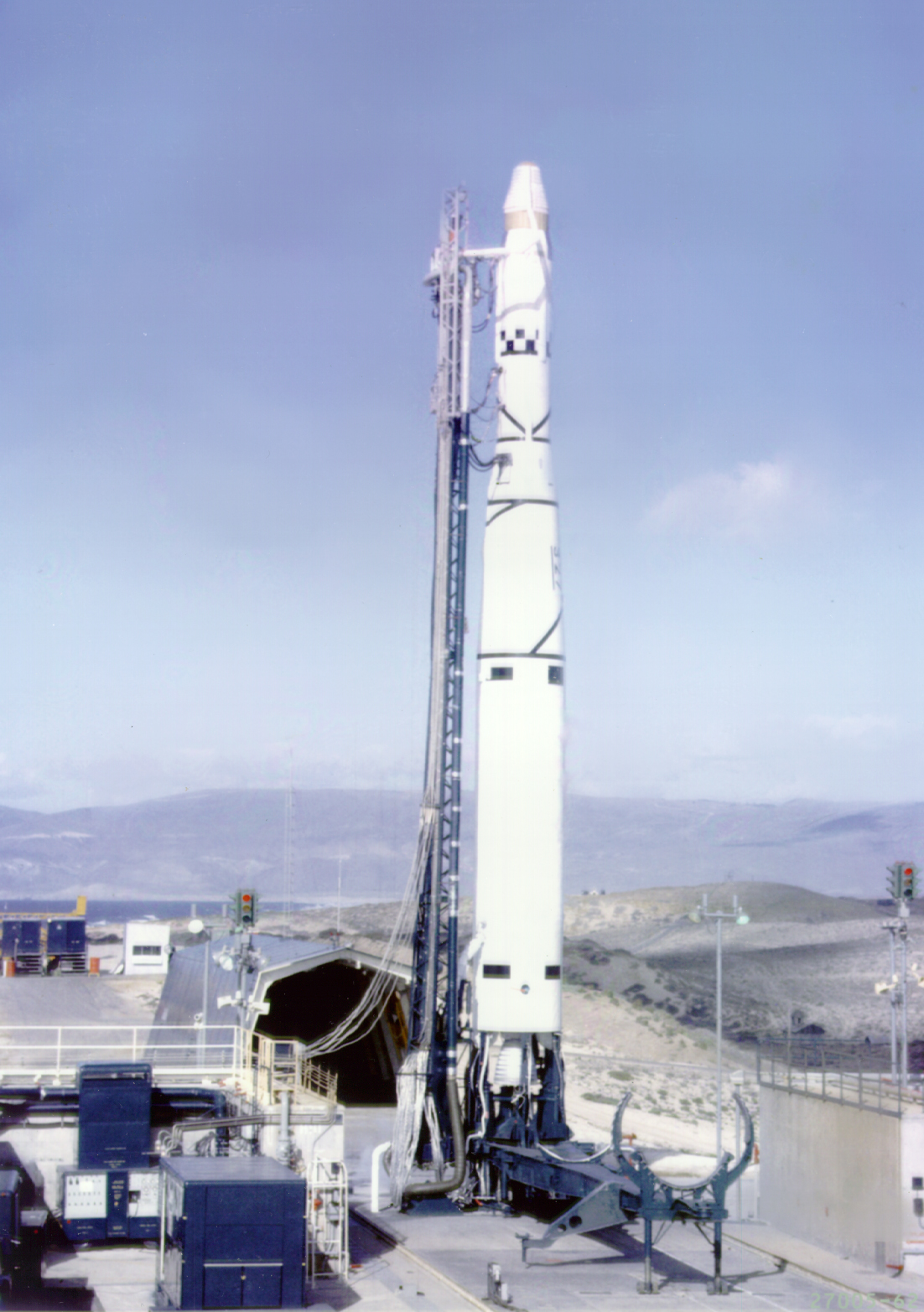
- A Thor-Agena launch vehicle, ready to launch the Discoverer 37 (KH-3) spacecraft, 13 January 1962
- Function: Expendable launch system
- Country of origin: United States

Size
- Height: Thor-Agena A: 28 m (92 ft); Thor-Agena B: 31 m (102 ft); Thor-Agena D: 31 m (102 ft)
- Diameter: 2.44 m (8 ft 0 in)
- Mass: Thor-Agena A: 53,130 kg (117,130 lb); Thor-Agena B: 56,507 kg (124,577 lb); Thor-Agena D: 56,507 kg (124,577 lb)
- Stages: 2

Launch history
- Status: Retired
- Launch sites: Vandenberg Air Force Base
- Total launches: 145
- First flight: 21 January 1959
- Last flight: 17 January 1968

Thor-Agena was a series of orbital launch vehicles. The launch vehicles used the Douglas-built Thor first stage and the Lockheed-built Agena second stages. They are thus cousins of the more-famous Thor-Deltas, which founded the Delta rocket family.

The first attempted launch of a Thor-Agena was in January 1959. The first successful launch was on 28 February 1959, launching Discoverer 1. It was the first two-stage launch vehicle to place a satellite into orbit.

== Missions ==
Among other uses, the clandestine CORONA program used Thor-Agena from June 1959 until January 1968 to launch United States military reconnaissance satellites operated by the Central Intelligence Agency (CIA).

During this program, Thor-Agena launch vehicles were used in 145 launch attempts, now known to have been part of satellite surveillance programs.

OSCAR 1 The first non governmental satellite was launched on Thor-Agena B Discover 36 in December 1961

Also, Alouette 1, Canada's first satellite, was launched on a Thor-Agena B.

== Versions ==
The following table lists the different Thor-Agena versions, designations and configurations:

Version	Designation	Image	Boosters	Stage 1	Stage 2
Thor-Agena A	Thor-DM18 Agena-A		-	DM-18A / MB-3-I	Agena-A / 8048
Thor-Agena B	Thor-DM21 Agena-B, Thor-SLV2 Agena-B		-	DM-21 / MB-3-II	Agena-B / 8081
Thor-Agena B	Thor-SLV2A Agena-B, TAT Agena-B		3 × Castor-1	DSV-2C / MB-3-III	Agena-B / 8081
Thor-Agena D	Thor-DM21 Agena-D, Thor-SLV2 Agena-D		-	DM-21 / MB-3-II	Agena-D / 8096
Thor-Agena D	Thor-SLV2A Agena-D, TAT Agena-D		3 × Castor-1	DSV-2C / MB-3-III	Agena-D / 8096
Thor-Agena D	Thorad-SLV2G Agena-D, LTTAT Agena-D		3 × Castor-2	DSV-2L / MB-3-III	Agena-D / 8096
Thor-Agena D	Thorad-SLV2H Agena-D, LTTAT Agena-D		3 × Castor-2	DSV-2L-1A / MB-3-III	Agena-D / 8096

=== Thor-Agena A ===
- Thor-Agena A (Thor-DM18 Agena-A) was used for 16 launches between 21 January 1959 and 13 September 1960
- The Discoverer 14 satellite used in the CORONA spy satellite program was launched by a Thor-Agena A. On 19 August 1960, usable photographic film from the satellite was recovered by a Fairchild C-119 Flying Boxcar recovery aircraft. This was the first successful recovery of film from an orbiting satellite and the first mid-air recovery of an object returning from Earth orbit.

=== Thor-Agena B ===
- Thor-Agena B (Thor-DM21 Agena-B or Thor-SLV2 Agena-B) was used for 44 launches between 26 October 1960 and 15 May 1966
- Includes a variant with Solid Rocket Boosters (TAT Agena-B or Thor-SLV2A Agena-B)
- First successful launch: 12 November 1960 with Discoverer 17
- Last launch: 15 May 1966 with Nimbus 2

=== Thor-Agena D ===
- Thor-Agena D (Thor-DM21 Agena-D or Thor-SLV2 Agena-D) was used for 83 launches between 28 June 1962 and 17 January 1968
- Includes a variant with Solid Rocket Boosters (TAT Agena-D or Thor-SLV2A Agena-D)
- First launch: 28 June 1962 with KH-4 19
- Last launch: 17 January 1968 with Multigroup 3 and Setter 1B-2

==== 1963 Mystery Cloud ====
On 28 February 1963, the maiden flight of Thrust-Augmented Thor Agena (TAT Agena-D) launch vehicle carrying a spy satellite into orbit was launched from Vandenberg Air Force Base. The launch vehicle went off course and mission control detonated the launch vehicle at an altitude of 44 km (27 mi) before it could reach orbit.

The launch vehicle detonation produced a large circular cloud that appeared over the southwestern United States. Due to its mysterious nature, appearing at a very high altitude and being visible for hundreds of miles, the cloud attracted widespread attention and was published by the news media. The cloud was featured on the cover of Science Magazine in April 1963, Weatherwise Magazine in May 1963, and had a full page image published in the May issue of Life Magazine. Prof. James MacDonald at the University of Arizona Institute for Atmospheric Physics investigated the phenomena and linked it to the Thor launch vehicle launch after contacting military personnel at Vandenberg Air Force Base. When the launch records were later declassified, the United States Air Force released a memo explaining that the cloud was the result of a military operation.
