= 1961 in spaceflight (July–December) =

This is a list of spaceflights launched between July and December 1961. For launches between January and June, see 1961 in spaceflight (January–June). For an overview of the whole year, see 1961 in spaceflight.

== Orbital launches ==
- ← Jan
- Feb
- Mar
- Apr
- May
- Jun
- Jul
- Aug
- Sep
- Oct
- Nov
- Dec →

Date and time (UTC)	Rocket	Flight number	Launch site		LSP	
Date and time (UTC)	Payload (⚀ = CubeSat)	Operator	Orbit	Function	Decay (UTC)	Outcome
Date and time (UTC)	Remarks					
=== July ===
7 July; 23:29:48	(United States) Thor DM-21 Agena-B		(United States) Vandenberg LC-75-3-5		(United States) US Air Force	
7 July; 23:29:48	(United States) Discoverer 26 (KH-2 6/9019)	US Air Force	Low Earth	Optical imaging	5 December	Successful
7 July; 23:29:48	(United States) SRV 511	US Air Force	Low Earth	Film return	10 July	Successful
12 July; 10:25:06	(United States) Thor DM-19 Delta		(United States) Cape Canaveral LC-17A		(United States) US Air Force	
12 July; 10:25:06	(United States) Tiros-3 (Tiros-C)	NASA	Low Earth	Weather	In orbit	Successful
12 July; 10:25:06	Deactivated on 28 February 1962.					
12 July; 15:11	(United States) Atlas LV-3A Agena-B		(United States) Point Arguello LC-1-2		(United States) US Air Force	
12 July; 15:11	(United States) MIDAS-3	US Air Force	Low Earth	Missile defence	In orbit	Successful
12 July; 15:11	Maiden flight of Atlas LV-3A Agena-B.					
21 July; 22:35	(United States) Thor DM-21 Agena-B		(United States) Vandenberg LC-75-3-4		(United States) US Air Force	
21 July; 22:35	(United States) Discoverer 27 (KH-5 4/9020A)	US Air Force	Intended: Low Earth	Optical imaging	8 June	Launch failure
21 July; 22:35	(United States) SRV 524	US Air Force	Intended: Low Earth	Film return	8 June	Launch failure
21 July; 22:35	Destroyed by range safety during ascent.					
← Jan; Feb; Mar; Apr; May; Jun; Jul; Aug; Sep; Oct; Nov; Dec →; === August ===
4 August; 00:01	(United States) Thor DM-21 Agena-B		(United States) Vandenberg LC-75-3-4		(United States) US Air Force	
4 August; 00:01	(United States) Discoverer 28 (KH-2 7/9021)	US Air Force	Intended: Low Earth	Optical imaging	4 August	Launch failure
4 August; 00:01	(United States) SRV 512	US Air Force	Intended: Low Earth	Film return	4 August	Launch failure
4 August; 00:01	Second stage control system malfunctioned, final KH-2 launch.					
6 August; 06:00	(Soviet Union) Vostok-K		(Soviet Union) Baikonur Site 1/5		(Soviet Union) RVSN	
6 August; 06:00	(Soviet Union) Vostok 2	RVSN	Low Earth	Test flight	7 August; 07:18	Successful
6 August; 06:00	Manned flight carrying cosmonaut Gherman Titov. Equipment module did not fully separate until reentry was underway. Titov ejected from spacecraft following reentry due to predicted hard landing and landed separately.					
16 August; 03:21:05	(United States) Thor DM-19 Delta		(United States) Cape Canaveral LC-17A		(United States) US Air Force	
16 August; 03:21:05	(United States) Explorer 12 (EPE-A/S-3)	NASA	Highly elliptical	Magnetospheric	31 August 1963	Successful
16 August; 03:21:05	Last signal received on 6 December.					
23 August; 06:02:00	(United States) Atlas LV-3A Agena-B		(United States) Cape Canaveral LC-12		(United States) US Air Force	
23 August; 06:02:00	(United States) Ranger 1 (P-32)	NASA	Intended: High Earth; Achieved: Low Earth	Technology	30 August	Partial launch failure
23 August; 06:02:00	Agena failed to restart resulting in lower orbit than planned, primary mission still accomplished.					
25 August; 18:29:44	(United States) Scout X-1		(United States) Wallops Island LA-3		(United States) NASA	
25 August; 18:29:44	(United States) Explorer 13 (S-55A)	NASA	Low Earth	Technology; Meteorite research	28 August	Launch failure
25 August; 18:29:44	Reached lower orbit than planned and quickly decayed.					
30 August; 20:00	(United States) Thor DM-21 Agena-B		(United States) Vandenberg LC-75-3-4		(United States) US Air Force	
30 August; 20:00	(United States) Discoverer 29 (KH-3 1 /9023)	US Air Force	Low Earth	Optical imaging	9 September	Successful
30 August; 20:00	(United States) SRV 554	US Air Force	Low Earth	Film return	1 September	Successful
30 August; 20:00	First KH-3 satellite.					
← Jan; Feb; Mar; Apr; May; Jun; Jul; Aug; Sep; Oct; Nov; Dec →; === September ===
9 September; 19:28	(United States) Atlas LV-3A Agena-B		(United States) Point Arguello LC-1-1		(United States) US Air Force	
9 September; 19:28	(United States) Samos-E2 1 (Samos 3)	US Air Force	Intended: Low Earth	Optical imaging	+0 seconds	Launch failure
9 September; 19:28	Electro-optical satellite, rocket exploded on launch pad.					
12 September; 19:59	(United States) Thor DM-21 Agena-B		(United States) Vandenberg LC-75-3-5		(United States) US Air Force	
12 September; 19:59	(United States) Discoverer 30 (KH-3 2/9022)	US Air Force	Low Earth	Optical imaging	11 December	Successful
12 September; 19:59	(United States) SRV 551	US Air Force	Low Earth	Film return	14 September	Successful
13 September; 14:04	(United States) Atlas LV-3B		(United States) Cape Canaveral LC-14		(United States) US Air Force	
13 September; 14:04	(United States) Mercury-Atlas 4	NASA	Low Earth	Test flight	15:58:20	Successful
17 September; 21:00	(United States) Thor DM-21 Agena-B		(United States) Vandenberg LC-75-1-1		(United States) US Air Force	
17 September; 21:00	(United States) Discoverer 31 (KH-3 3/9024)	US Air Force	Low Earth	Optical imaging	26 October	Successful
17 September; 21:00	(United States) SRV 552	US Air Force	Low Earth	Film return	19 September	Spacecraft failure
17 September; 21:00	SRV recovery failed.					
← Jan; Feb; Mar; Apr; May; Jun; Jul; Aug; Sep; Oct; Nov; Dec →; === October ===
13 October; 19:22	(United States) Thor DM-21 Agena-B		(United States) Vandenberg LC-75-3-4		(United States) US Air Force	
13 October; 19:22	(United States) Discoverer 32 (KH-3 4/9025)	US Air Force	Low Earth	Optical imaging	13 November	Successful
13 October; 19:22	(United States) SRV 555	US Air Force	Low Earth	Film return	14 October	Successful
21 October; 13:53:03	(United States) Atlas LV-3A Agena-B		(United States) Point Arguello LC-1-2		(United States) US Air Force	
21 October; 13:53:03	(United States) MIDAS-4	US Air Force	Low Earth	Missile defence	In orbit	Successful
21 October; 13:53:03	(United States) Westford-1	Lincoln	Low Earth	Communications; Technology	In orbit	Spacecraft failure
21 October; 13:53:03	Westford-1 released 480 million copper dipoles, which failed to disperse correctly preventing experiments from being conducted.					
23 October; 19:23	(United States) Thor DM-21 Agena-B		(United States) Vandenberg LC-75-3-5		(United States) US Air Force	
23 October; 19:23	(United States) Discoverer 33 (KH-2 8/9026)	US Air Force	Intended: Low Earth	Optical imaging	23 October	Launch failure
23 October; 19:23	(United States) SRV 513	US Air Force	Intended: Low Earth	Film return	23 October	Launch failure
23 October; 19:23	Rocket shut down prematurely, failed to orbit.					
27 October; 16:30	(Soviet Union) Kosmos 63S1		(Soviet Union) Kapustin Yar Mayak-2		(Soviet Union) RVSN	
27 October; 16:30	(Soviet Union) DS-1 №1	RVSN	Intended: Low Earth	Technology	27 October	Launch failure
27 October; 16:30	Maiden flight of Kosmos-2I 63S1, acceleration integrator malfunctioned, failed to reach orbit.					
← Jan; Feb; Mar; Apr; May; Jun; Jul; Aug; Sep; Oct; Nov; Dec →; === November ===
1 November; 15:32	(United States) RM-90 Blue Scout II		(United States) Cape Canaveral LC-18B		(United States) US Air Force	
1 November; 15:32	(United States) Mercury-Scout 1 (MNTV)	NASA	Intended: Low Earth	Tracking test	+43 seconds	Launch failure
1 November; 15:32	Would have been used to test Mercury Tracking Network, went out of control 28 seconds after launch, subsequently destroyed by range safety, only orbital launch attempt of Blue Scout II.					
5 November; 20:00	(United States) Thor DM-21 Agena-B		(United States) Vandenberg LC-75-1-1		(United States) US Air Force	
5 November; 20:00	(United States) Discoverer 34 (KH-2 9/9027)	US Air Force	Low Earth	Optical imaging	7 December 1962	Launch failure
5 November; 20:00	(United States) SRV 553	US Air Force	Low Earth	Film return	7 December 1962	Launch failure
5 November; 20:00	Placed in useless orbit due to erroneous launch trajectory, SRV not released.					
15 November; 21:23	(United States) Thor DM-21 Agena-B		(United States) Vandenberg LC-75-3-4		(United States) US Air Force	
15 November; 21:23	(United States) Discoverer 35 (KH-2 10/9028)	US Air Force	Low Earth	Optical imaging	3 December	Successful
15 November; 21:23	(United States) SRV 523	US Air Force	Low Earth	Film return	16 November	Successful
15 November; 22:26	(United States) Thor DM-21 Ablestar		(United States) Cape Canaveral LC-17B		(United States) US Air Force	
15 November; 22:26	(United States) Transit 4B	US Navy	Low Earth	Navigation; Technology	In orbit	Successful
15 November; 22:26	(United States) TRAAC	US Navy	Low Earth	Technology	In orbit	Successful
15 November; 22:26	Transit 4B carried a SNAP-3 nuclear reactor.					
18 November; 08:12	(United States) Atlas LV-3A Agena-B		(United States) Cape Canaveral LC-12		(United States) US Air Force	
18 November; 08:12	(United States) Ranger 2 (P-33)	NASA	Intended: High Earth; Achieved: Low Earth	Technology	20 November	Launch failure
18 November; 08:12	Agena failed to restart resulting in lower orbit than planned, spacecraft decayed quickly.					
22 November; 20:45:47	(United States) Atlas LV-3A Agena-B		(United States) Point Arguello LC-1-1		(United States) US Air Force	
22 November; 20:45:47	(United States) Samos-E5 1 (Samos 4)	US Air Force	Intended: Low Earth	Optical imaging	22 November	Launch failure
22 November; 20:45:47	(United States) Samos 4 RV	US Air Force	Intended: Low Earth	Film return	22 November	Launch failure
22 November; 20:45:47	Film-return satellite, failed to orbit.					
29 November; 15:07:57	(United States) Atlas LV-3B		(United States) Cape Canaveral LC-14		(United States) US Air Force	
29 November; 15:07:57	(United States) Mercury-Atlas 5	NASA	Low Earth	Test flight	18:28:59	Successful
29 November; 15:07:57	Carried Enos the Chimp.					
← Jan; Feb; Mar; Apr; May; Jun; Jul; Aug; Sep; Oct; Nov; Dec →; === December ===
11 December; 09:39:02	(Soviet Union) Vostok-K		(Soviet Union) Baikonur Site 1/5		(Soviet Union) RVSN	
11 December; 09:39:02	(Soviet Union) Zenit-2 №1	RVSN	Intended: Low Earth	Optical imaging	+407 seconds	Launch failure
11 December; 09:39:02	First launch of a Zenit satellite, failed to orbit due to premature cutoff of upper stage, spacecraft commanded to self-destruct 407 seconds after launch.					
12 December; 20:40	(United States) Thor DM-21 Agena-B		(United States) Vandenberg LC-75-3-4		(United States) US Air Force	
12 December; 20:40	(United States) Discoverer 36 (KH-3 5/9029)	US Air Force	Low Earth	Optical imaging	3 December	Successful
12 December; 20:40	(United States) SRV 525	US Air Force	Low Earth	Film return	16 December	Successful
12 December; 20:40	(United States) OSCAR 1	Project OSCAR	Low Earth	Amateur radio	31 January 1962	Successful
12 December; 20:40	First amateur-built satellite.					
21 December; 12:30	(Soviet Union) Kosmos 63S1		(Soviet Union) Kapustin Yar Mayak-2		(Soviet Union) RVSN	
21 December; 12:30	(Soviet Union) Kosmos DS-1 №2	RVSN	Intended: Low Earth	Technology	21 December	Launch failure
21 December; 12:30	Second stage oxidiser exhausted prematurely due to turbopump malfunction, failed to orbit.					
22 December; 19:12:33	(United States) Atlas LV-3A Agena-B		(United States) Point Arguello LC-1-2		(United States) US Air Force	
22 December; 19:12:33	(United States) FTV-2203 (Samos-E5 2/Samos 5)	US Air Force	Low Earth	Optical imaging	31 December	Launch failure
22 December; 19:12:33	(United States) Samos 5 RV	US Air Force	Low Earth	Film return	9 January 1962	Launch failure
22 December; 19:12:33	Film-return satellite, overshot target orbit resulting in return vehicle being unable to deorbit.					
← Jan; Feb; Mar; Apr; May; Jun; Jul; Aug; Sep; Oct; Nov; Dec →

== Suborbital launches ==
- ← Jan
- Feb
- Mar
- Apr
- May
- Jun
- Jul
- Aug
- Sep
- Oct
- Nov
- Dec →

Date and time (UTC)	Rocket	Flight number	Launch site		LSP	
Date and time (UTC)	Payload (⚀ = CubeSat)	Operator	Orbit	Function	Decay (UTC)	Outcome
Date and time (UTC)	Remarks					
=== July ===
1 July; 02:00	(United States) MGM-31 Pershing I		(United States) Cape Canaveral LC-30		(United States) US Army	
1 July; 02:00		US Army	Suborbital	Missile test	1 July	Successful
1 July; 02:00	Apogee: 250 kilometres (160 mi)					
4 July; 04:00	(Soviet Union) R-7A Semyorka		(Soviet Union) Baikonur Site 31/6		(Soviet Union) RVSN	
4 July; 04:00		RVSN	Suborbital	Missile test	4 July	Successful
4 July; 04:00	Apogee: 1,350 kilometres (840 mi)					
4 July; 20:20	(Soviet Union) R-7A Semyorka		(Soviet Union) Baikonur Site 31/6		(Soviet Union) RVSN	
4 July; 20:20		RVSN	Suborbital	Missile test	4 July	Successful
4 July; 20:20	Apogee: 1,350 kilometres (840 mi)					
7 July; 04:51	(United States) SM-65E Atlas		(United States) Cape Canaveral LC-13		(United States) US Air Force	
7 July; 04:51		US Air Force	Suborbital	Missile test	7 July	Successful
7 July; 04:51	Apogee: 1,500 kilometres (930 mi)					
13 July; 22:07	(United States) Nike-Cajun		(United States) Wallops Island		(United States) NASA	
13 July; 22:07		NASA	Suborbital	Aeronomy	13 July	Successful
13 July; 22:07	Apogee: 119 kilometres (74 mi)					
13 July	(United States) UGM-27 Polaris A2		(United States) Cape Canaveral LC-29A		(United States) US Navy	
13 July		US Navy	Suborbital	Missile test	13 July	Successful
13 July	Apogee: 1,000 kilometres (620 mi)					
14 July; 02:57	(United States) Nike-Apache		(United States) Wallops Island		(United States) NASA	
14 July; 02:57		New Hampshire	Suborbital	Magnetospheric	14 July	Successful
14 July; 02:57	Apogee: 196 kilometres (122 mi)					
14 July; 15:00	(United States) Nike-Apache		(United States) Wallops Island		(United States) NASA	
14 July; 15:00		New Hampshire	Suborbital	Magnetospheric	14 July	Successful
14 July; 15:00	Apogee: 200 kilometres (120 mi)					
14 July; 16:02	(United States) Nike-Cajun		(United States) Wallops Island		(United States) NASA	
14 July; 16:02		NASA	Suborbital	Aeronomy	14 July	Successful
14 July; 16:02	Apogee: 101 kilometres (63 mi)					
19 July	(Soviet Union) R-5 Pobeda		(Soviet Union) Kapustin Yar		(Soviet Union) RVSN	
19 July		RVSN	Suborbital	Target	19 July	Successful
19 July	Apogee: 500 kilometres (310 mi)					
19 July	(Soviet Union) R-5 Pobeda		(Soviet Union) Kapustin Yar		(Soviet Union) RVSN	
19 July		RVSN	Suborbital	Target	19 July	Successful
19 July	Apogee: 500 kilometres (310 mi)					
20 July; 02:00	(United States) MGM-31 Pershing I		(United States) Cape Canaveral LC-30A		(United States) US Army	
20 July; 02:00		US Army	Suborbital	Missile test	20 July	Successful
20 July; 02:00	Apogee: 250 kilometres (160 mi)					
20 July; 10:30	(United States) Nike-Cajun		(United States) Wallops Island		(United States) NASA	
20 July; 10:30		NASA	Suborbital	Aeronomy	20 July	Successful
20 July; 10:30	Apogee: 124 kilometres (77 mi)					
20 July; 13:12	(United States) Nike-Apache		(United States) Wallops Island		(United States) NASA	
20 July; 13:12		New Hampshire	Suborbital	Magnetospheric	20 July	Successful
20 July; 13:12	Apogee: 193 kilometres (120 mi)					
21 July; 02:00	(United States) HGM-25A Titan I		(United States) Cape Canaveral LC-20		(United States) US Air Force	
21 July; 02:00		US Air Force	Suborbital	Missile test	21 July	Successful
21 July; 02:00	Apogee: 1,000 kilometres (620 mi)					
21 July; 02:42	(Japan) Kappa-8		(Japan) Akita		(Japan) ISAS	
21 July; 02:42		ISAS	Suborbital	Aeronomy; Ionospheric	21 July	Successful
21 July; 02:42	Apogee: 158 kilometres (98 mi)					
21 July; 12:20	(United States) Redstone MRLV		(United States) Cape Canaveral LC-5		(United States) NASA	
21 July; 12:20	(United States) Mercury-Redstone 4	NASA	Suborbital	Manned flight	21 July	Partial spacecraft failure
21 July; 12:20	Carried Gus Grissom, apogee: 189 kilometres (117 mi), capsule sank during recovery operations after landing following inadvertent opening of escape hatch, final flight of the Mercury-Redstone programme					
22 July	(Soviet Union) R-12 Dvina		(Soviet Union) Kapustin Yar		(Soviet Union) MVS	
22 July		MVS	Suborbital	Missile test	22 July	Successful
22 July	Apogee: 402 kilometres (250 mi)					
22 July	(Soviet Union) R-16		(Soviet Union) Baikonur Site 41/4		(Soviet Union) RVSN	
22 July		RVSN	Suborbital	Missile test	22 July	Launch failure
25 July; 19:05	(United States) HGM-25A Titan I		(United States) Cape Canaveral LC-19		(United States) US Air Force	
25 July; 19:05		US Air Force	Suborbital	Missile test	25 July	Successful
25 July; 19:05	Apogee: 1,000 kilometres (620 mi)					
25 July	(Soviet Union) R-12 Dvina		(Soviet Union) Kapustin Yar		(Soviet Union) MVS	
25 July		MVS	Suborbital	Missile test	25 July	Successful
25 July	Apogee: 402 kilometres (250 mi)					
25 July	(Soviet Union) R-9 Desna		(Soviet Union) Baikonur Site 51		(Soviet Union) RVSN	
25 July		RVSN	Suborbital	Missile test	25 July	Successful
25 July	Apogee: 1,160 kilometres (720 mi)					
26 July; 19:22	(United States) Nike-Cajun		(United States) Wallops Island		(United States) NASA	
26 July; 19:22		Michigan	Suborbital	Aeronomy	26 July	Successful
26 July; 19:22	Apogee: 143 kilometres (89 mi)					
26 July	(United States) Nike-Zeus		(United States) White Sands LC-38		(United States) US Army	
26 July		US Army	Suborbital	Missile test	26 July	Successful
26 July	Apogee: 150 kilometres (93 mi)					
27 July; 11:45	(United States) Strongarm-1		(United States) White Sands		(United States) US Air Force	
27 July; 11:45		US Air Force	Suborbital	Aeronomy	27 July	Launch failure
27 July; 11:45	Apogee: 75 kilometres (47 mi)					
27 July; 11:45	(United States) Strongarm-1		(United States) White Sands		(United States) US Air Force	
27 July; 11:45		US Air Force	Suborbital	Aeronomy	27 July	Launch failure
27 July; 11:45	Apogee: 75 kilometres (47 mi)					
27 July; 15:09	(United States) LGM-30A Minuteman IA		(United States) Cape Canaveral LC-31A		(United States) US Air Force	
27 July; 15:09		US Air Force	Suborbital	Missile test	27 July	Successful
27 July; 15:09	Apogee: 1,300 kilometres (810 mi)					
27 July	(Soviet Union) R-12 Dvina		(Soviet Union) Kapustin Yar		(Soviet Union) MVS	
27 July		MVS	Suborbital	Missile test	27 July	Successful
27 July	Apogee: 402 kilometres (250 mi)					
30 July	(Soviet Union) R-9 Desna		(Soviet Union) Baikonur Site 51		(Soviet Union) RVSN	
30 July		RVSN	Suborbital	Missile test	30 July	Successful
30 July	Apogee: 1,160 kilometres (720 mi)					
31 July; 21:32	(United States) SM-65E Atlas		(United States) Cape Canaveral LC-11		(United States) US Air Force	
31 July; 21:32		US Air Force	Suborbital	Missile test	31 July	Successful
31 July; 21:32	Apogee: 1,500 kilometres (930 mi)					
=== August ===
1 August; 11:02	(United Kingdom) Skylark-2		(Australia) Woomera LA-2		(United Kingdom) RAE	
1 August; 11:02		UCL	Suborbital	UV Astronomy	1 August	Successful
1 August; 11:02	Apogee: 124 kilometres (77 mi)					
1 August; 20:18	(United States) Astrobee-1500		(United States) Point Arguello LC-A		(United States) US Air Force	
1 August; 20:18		US Air Force	Suborbital	Geodesy	1 August	Launch failure
1 August; 20:18	Apogee: 10 kilometres (6.2 mi)					
2 August	(United States) UGM-27 Polaris A2		(United States) Cape Canaveral LC-29A		(United States) US Navy	
2 August		US Navy	Suborbital	Missile test	2 August	Successful
2 August	Apogee: 1,000 kilometres (620 mi)					
3 August	(Soviet Union) R-9 Desna		(Soviet Union) Baikonur Site 51		(Soviet Union) RVSN	
3 August		RVSN	Suborbital	Missile test	3 August	Launch failure
4 August	(United States) HGM-25A Titan I		(United States) Cape Canaveral LC-20		(United States) US Air Force	
4 August		US Air Force	Suborbital	Missile test	4 August	Successful
4 August	Apogee: 1,000 kilometres (620 mi)					
5 August; 00:19	(United States) PGM-19 Jupiter		(United States) Cape Canaveral LC-26A		(United States) US Army	
5 August; 00:19		US Army	Suborbital	Missile test	5 August	Successful
5 August; 00:19	Apogee: 500 kilometres (310 mi)					
9 August; 04:31	(United States) SM-65F Atlas		(United States) Cape Canaveral LC-13		(United States) US Air Force	
9 August; 04:31		US Air Force	Suborbital	Missile test	9 August	Successful
9 August; 04:31	Apogee: 1,400 kilometres (870 mi), maiden flight of Atlas F					
9 August	(Soviet Union) R-16		(Soviet Union) Baikonur Site 41/4		(Soviet Union) RVSN	
9 August		RVSN	Suborbital	Missile test	9 August	Successful
9 August	Apogee: 1,210 kilometres (750 mi)					
10 August	(United States) MGM-31 Pershing I		(United States) Cape Canaveral LC-30A		(United States) US Army	
10 August		US Army	Suborbital	Missile test	10 August	Launch failure
10 August	Apogee: 5 kilometres (3.1 mi)					
11 August; 14:30	(United States) Exos		(United States) Eglin		(United States) US Air Force	
11 August; 14:30		US Air Force	Suborbital	Ionospheric	11 August	Successful
11 August; 14:30	Apogee: 114 kilometres (71 mi)					
11 August	(Soviet Union) R-5 Pobeda		(Soviet Union) Kapustin Yar		(Soviet Union) RVSN	
11 August		RVSN	Suborbital	Target	11 August	Successful
11 August	Apogee: 500 kilometres (310 mi)					
11 August	(Soviet Union) R-5 Pobeda		(Soviet Union) Kapustin Yar		(Soviet Union) RVSN	
11 August		RVSN	Suborbital	Target	11 August	Successful
11 August	Apogee: 500 kilometres (310 mi)					
12 August; 10:57	(United States) Aerobee-150A		(United States) Wallops Island		(United States) NASA	
12 August; 10:57		NASA	Suborbital	Technology	12 August	Successful
12 August; 10:57	Apogee: 153 kilometres (95 mi)					
12 August	(United States) UGM-27 Polaris A1		(United States) USS Abraham Lincoln, ETR		(United States) US Navy	
12 August		US Navy	Suborbital	Missile test	12 August	Successful
12 August	Apogee: 500 kilometres (310 mi)					
12 August	(United States) UGM-27 Polaris A1		(United States) USS Abraham Lincoln, ETR		(United States) US Navy	
12 August		US Navy	Suborbital	Missile test	12 August	Successful
12 August	Apogee: 500 kilometres (310 mi)					
12 August	(United States) UGM-27 Polaris A1		(United States) USS Abraham Lincoln, ETR		(United States) US Navy	
12 August		US Navy	Suborbital	Missile test	12 August	Successful
12 August	Apogee: 500 kilometres (310 mi)					
12 August	(United States) UGM-27 Polaris A1		(United States) USS Abraham Lincoln, ETR		(United States) US Navy	
12 August		US Navy	Suborbital	Missile test	12 August	Successful
12 August	Apogee: 500 kilometres (310 mi)					
12 August	(United States) UGM-27 Polaris A1		(United States) USS Abraham Lincoln, ETR		(United States) US Navy	
12 August		US Navy	Suborbital	Missile test	12 August	Successful
12 August	Apogee: 500 kilometres (310 mi)					
12 August	(United States) UGM-27 Polaris A1		(United States) USS Abraham Lincoln, ETR		(United States) US Navy	
12 August		US Navy	Suborbital	Missile test	12 August	Successful
12 August	Apogee: 500 kilometres (310 mi)					
13 August	(Soviet Union) R-16		(Soviet Union) Baikonur Site 41/4		(Soviet Union) RVSN	
13 August		RVSN	Suborbital	Missile test	13 August	Launch failure
15 August; 17:21	(United States) Aerobee-150 (Hi)		(United States) White Sands LC-35		(United States) US Air Force	
15 August; 17:21		US Air Force	Suborbital	Solar	15 August	Successful
15 August; 17:21	Apogee: 271 kilometres (168 mi)					
15 August	(Soviet Union) R-12 Dvina		(Soviet Union) Kapustin Yar		(Soviet Union) MVS	
15 August		MVS	Suborbital	Missile test	15 August	Successful
15 August	Apogee: 402 kilometres (250 mi)					
16 August; 20:27	(United States) Nike-Apache		(United States) Wallops Island		(United States) NASA	
16 August; 20:27		NASA	Suborbital	Test flight	16 August	Successful
16 August; 20:27	Apogee: 182 kilometres (113 mi)					
17 August; 14:29	(United States) XRM-91 Blue Scout Junior		(United States) Cape Canaveral LC-18A		(United States) US Air Force	
17 August; 14:29		US Air Force	Suborbital	Magnetospheric	17 August	Successful
17 August; 14:29	Apogee: 225,000 kilometres (140,000 mi)					
17 August	(Soviet Union) R-5 Pobeda		(Soviet Union) Kapustin Yar		(Soviet Union) RVSN	
17 August		RVSN	Suborbital	Target	17 August	Launch failure
17 August	Apogee: 100 kilometres (62 mi)					
17 August	(Soviet Union) R-5 Pobeda		(Soviet Union) Kapustin Yar		(Soviet Union) RVSN	
17 August		RVSN	Suborbital	Target	17 August	Successful
17 August	Apogee: 500 kilometres (310 mi)					
18 August; 03:06	(United States) Nike-Cajun		(United States) Wallops Island		(United States) NASA	
18 August; 03:06		GCA	Suborbital	Ionospheric	18 August	Successful
18 August; 03:06	Apogee: 141 kilometres (88 mi)					
18 August	(United States) UGM-27 Polaris A2		(United States) USNS Observation Island, ETR		(United States) US Navy	
18 August		US Navy	Suborbital	Missile test	18 August	Launch failure
18 August	Apogee: 5 kilometres (3.1 mi)					
22 August	(United States) MGM-31 Pershing I		(United States) Cape Canaveral LC-30A		(United States) US Army	
22 August		US Army	Suborbital	Missile test	22 August	Successful
22 August	Apogee: 250 kilometres (160 mi)					
22 August	(Soviet Union) R-5 Pobeda		(Soviet Union) Kapustin Yar		(Soviet Union) RVSN	
22 August		RVSN	Suborbital	Target	22 August	Launch failure
22 August	Apogee: 100 kilometres (62 mi)					
22 August	(Soviet Union) R-5 Pobeda		(Soviet Union) Kapustin Yar		(Soviet Union) RVSN	
22 August		RVSN	Suborbital	Target	22 August	Successful
22 August	Apogee: 500 kilometres (310 mi)					
23 August; 01:16	(United States) SM-65D Atlas		(United States) Vandenberg LC-576B-3		(United States) US Air Force	
23 August; 01:16		US Air Force	Suborbital	Missile test	23 August	Successful
23 August; 01:16	Apogee: 1,800 kilometres (1,100 mi)					
23 August; 17:02	(United States) Aerobee-150 (Hi)		(United States) White Sands LC-35		(United States) US Air Force	
23 August; 17:02		US Air Force	Suborbital	Aeronomy; Solar	23 August	Successful
23 August; 17:02	Apogee: 225 kilometres (140 mi)					
24 August	(Soviet Union) R-5 Pobeda		(Soviet Union) Kapustin Yar		(Soviet Union) RVSN	
24 August		RVSN	Suborbital	Target	24 August	Successful
24 August	Apogee: 500 kilometres (310 mi)					
25 August	(Soviet Union) R-5 Pobeda		(Soviet Union) Kapustin Yar		(Soviet Union) RVSN	
25 August		RVSN	Suborbital	Target	25 August	Successful
25 August	Apogee: 500 kilometres (310 mi)					
25 August	(Soviet Union) R-5 Pobeda		(Soviet Union) Kapustin Yar		(Soviet Union) RVSN	
25 August		RVSN	Suborbital	Target	25 August	Successful
25 August	Apogee: 500 kilometres (310 mi)					
28 August; 17:41	(United States) Nike-Asp		(United States) Eglin		(United States) US Air Force	
28 August; 17:41		US Air Force	Suborbital	Ionospheric	28 August	Successful
28 August; 17:41	Apogee: 200 kilometres (120 mi)					
29 August; 14:35	(United States) Aerobee-150 (Hi)		(United States) White Sands		(United States) NRL	
29 August; 14:35		NRL	Suborbital	Solar	29 August	Successful
29 August; 14:35	Apogee: 260 kilometres (160 mi)					
30 August; 18:30	(United States) LGM-30A Minuteman IA		(United States) Cape Canaveral LC-32B		(United States) US Air Force	
30 August; 18:30		US Air Force	Suborbital	Missile test	30 August	Launch failure
30 August; 18:30	Apogee: 1 kilometre (0.62 mi)					
30 August	(Soviet Union) R-12 Dvina		(Soviet Union) Kapustin Yar		(Soviet Union) MVS	
30 August		MVS	Suborbital	Missile test	30 August	Successful
30 August	Apogee: 402 kilometres (250 mi)					
30 August	(United States) RAM-A		(United States) Wallops Island		(United States) NASA	
30 August		NASA	Suborbital	REV Test	30 August	Successful
30 August	Apogee: 1,280 kilometres (800 mi)					
31 August	(United States) Nike-Zeus		(United States) White Sands LC-38		(United States) US Army	
31 August		US Army	Suborbital	Missile test	31 August	Successful
31 August	Apogee: 150 kilometres (93 mi)					
31 August	(Soviet Union) R-12 Dvina		(Soviet Union) Kapustin Yar		(Soviet Union) MVS	
31 August		MVS	Suborbital	Missile test	31 August	Successful
31 August	Apogee: 402 kilometres (250 mi)					
=== September ===
4 September	(Soviet Union) R-16		(Soviet Union) Baikonur Site 41/4		(Soviet Union) RVSN	
4 September		RVSN	Suborbital	Missile test	4 September	Successful
4 September	Apogee: 1,210 kilometres (750 mi)					
6 September; 22:30	(United States) PGM-17 Thor DM-18A		(United States) Vandenberg LE-7		(United Kingdom) Royal Air Force	
6 September; 22:30		Royal Air Force	Suborbital	Missile test	6 September	Successful
6 September; 22:30	Apogee: 520 kilometres (320 mi)					
6 September	(Soviet Union) R-5M Pobeda		(Soviet Union) Kapustin Yar		(Soviet Union) RVSN	
6 September		RVSN	Suborbital	Nuclear test	6 September	Successful
6 September	Apogee: 500 kilometres (310 mi)					
7 September; 01:30	(United States) HGM-25A Titan I		(United States) Cape Canaveral LC-20		(United States) US Air Force	
7 September; 01:30		US Air Force	Suborbital	Missile test	7 September	Successful
7 September; 01:30	Apogee: 1,000 kilometres (620 mi)					
7 September; 18:17	(United States) Nike-Asp		(Italy) Salto di Quirra		(Italy) CRA	
7 September; 18:17		ROSAP	Suborbital	Aeronomy	7 September	Successful
7 September; 18:17	Apogee: 200 kilometres (120 mi)					
8 September; 04:06	(United States) Nike-Cajun		(Italy) Salto di Quirra		(Italy) CRA	
8 September; 04:06		ROSAP	Suborbital	Aeronomy	8 September	Successful
8 September; 04:06	Apogee: 100 kilometres (62 mi)					
8 September; 04:11	(United States) Nike-Cajun		(Italy) Salto di Quirra		(Italy) CRA	
8 September; 04:11		ROSAP	Suborbital	Aeronomy	8 September	Successful
8 September; 04:11	Apogee: 145 kilometres (90 mi)					
8 September	(United States) HGM-25A Titan I		(United States) Cape Canaveral LC-19		(United States) US Air Force	
8 September		US Air Force	Suborbital	Missile test	8 September	Successful
8 September	Apogee: 1,000 kilometres (620 mi)					
9 September; 01:42	(United States) SM-65E Atlas		(United States) Cape Canaveral LC-13		(United States) US Air Force	
9 September; 01:42		US Air Force	Suborbital	Missile test	9 September	Launch failure
9 September; 01:42	Apogee: 1,000 kilometres (620 mi), propulsion system malfunctioned					
9 September; 20:02	(United States) Nike-Zeus		(United States) Point Mugu		(United States) US Army	
9 September; 20:02		US Army	Suborbital	Missile test	9 September	Launch failure
9 September; 20:02	Apogee: 1 kilometre (0.62 mi)					
10 September; 05:50	(Soviet Union) R-12 Dvina		(Soviet Union) Novaya Zemlya		(Soviet Union) RVSN	
10 September; 05:50		RVSN	Suborbital	Nuclear test	10 September	Successful
10 September; 05:50	Apogee: 100 kilometres (62 mi)					
10 September	(Soviet Union) R-16		(Soviet Union) Baikonur Site 41/4		(Soviet Union) RVSN	
10 September		RVSN	Suborbital	Missile test	10 September	Successful
10 September	Apogee: 1,210 kilometres (750 mi)					
10 September	(Soviet Union) R-9 Desna		(Soviet Union) Baikonur Site 51		(Soviet Union) RVSN	
10 September		RVSN	Suborbital	Missile test	10 September	Launch failure
11 September	(Soviet Union) R-12 Dvina		(Soviet Union) Kapustin Yar		(Soviet Union) MVS	
11 September		MVS	Suborbital	Missile test	11 September	Successful
11 September	Apogee: 402 kilometres (250 mi)					
12 September; 05:00	(Soviet Union) R-12 Dvina		(Soviet Union) Novaya Zemlya		(Soviet Union) RVSN	
12 September; 05:00		RVSN	Suborbital	Nuclear test	12 September	Successful
12 September; 05:00	Apogee: 100 kilometres (62 mi)					
13 September; 09:32	(United States) Javelin		(United States) Wallops Island		(United States) NASA	
13 September; 09:32		GCA	Suborbital	Aeronomy	13 September	Successful
13 September; 09:32	Apogee: 331 kilometres (206 mi)					
13 September; 23:53	(United States) Javelin		(United States) Wallops Island		(United States) NASA	
13 September; 23:53		GCA	Suborbital	Aeronomy	13 September	Successful
13 September; 23:53	Apogee: 431 kilometres (268 mi)					
13 September	(United States) MGM-31 Pershing I		(United States) Cape Canaveral LC-30A		(United States) US Army	
13 September		US Army	Suborbital	Missile test	13 September	Successful
13 September	Apogee: 250 kilometres (160 mi)					
13 September	(Soviet Union) R-12 Dvina		(Soviet Union) Kapustin Yar		(Soviet Union) MVS	
13 September		MVS	Suborbital	Missile test	13 September	Successful
13 September	Apogee: 402 kilometres (250 mi)					
13 September	(Soviet Union) R-16		(Soviet Union) Baikonur Site 41/4		(Soviet Union) RVSN	
13 September		RVSN	Suborbital	Missile test	13 September	Successful
13 September	Apogee: 1,210 kilometres (750 mi)					
14 September; 04:45	(Soviet Union) R-13		(Soviet Union) Project 611 Submarine, Kola Peninsula		(Soviet Union) RVSN	
14 September; 04:45		RVSN	Suborbital	Nuclear test	14 September	Successful
14 September; 04:45	Apogee: 150 kilometres (93 mi)					
16 September; 04:00	(Soviet Union) R-13		(Soviet Union) Project 611 Submarine, Kola Peninsula		(Soviet Union) RVSN	
16 September; 04:00		RVSN	Suborbital	Nuclear test	16 September	Successful
16 September; 04:00	Apogee: 150 kilometres (93 mi)					
16 September; 10:02	(United States) Nike-Asp		(United States) Wallops Island		(United States) NASA	
16 September; 10:02		GCA	Suborbital	Aeronomy	16 September	Launch failure
16 September; 10:02	Apogee: 27 kilometres (17 mi)					
16 September; 21:39	(United States) Nike-Asp		(United States) Wallops Island		(United States) NASA	
16 September; 21:39		GCA	Suborbital	Aeronomy	16 September	Successful
16 September; 21:39	Apogee: 208 kilometres (129 mi)					
16 September; 23:55	(United States) Nike-Cajun		(United States) Wallops Island		(United States) NASA	
16 September; 23:55		NASA	Suborbital	Aeronomy	16 September	Launch failure
16 September; 23:55	Apogee: 88 kilometres (55 mi)					
17 September; 04:47	(United States) Trailblazer 1		(United States) Wallops Island		(United States) NASA	
17 September; 04:47		NASA	Suborbital	REV Test	17 September	Successful
17 September; 04:47	Apogee: 260 kilometres (160 mi)					
17 September; 10:03	(United States) Nike-Asp		(United States) Wallops Island		(United States) NASA	
17 September; 10:03		GCA	Suborbital	Aeronomy	17 September	Successful
17 September; 10:03	Apogee: 273 kilometres (170 mi)					
17 September	(Soviet Union) R-16		(Soviet Union) Baikonur Site 41/4		(Soviet Union) RVSN	
17 September		RVSN	Suborbital	Missile test	17 September	Successful
17 September	Apogee: 1,210 kilometres (750 mi)					
18 September; 12:15	(United Kingdom) Skylark-2C		(Australia) Woomera LA-2		(United States) NASA	
18 September; 12:15		NASA	Suborbital	UV Astronomy	18 September	Successful
18 September; 12:15	Apogee: 193 kilometres (120 mi)					
19 September	(Soviet Union) R-9 Desna		(Soviet Union) Baikonur Site 51		(Soviet Union) RVSN	
19 September		RVSN	Suborbital	Missile test	19 September	Launch failure
21 September	(Soviet Union) R-7A Semyorka		(Soviet Union) Baikonur Site 31/6		(Soviet Union) RVSN	
21 September		RVSN	Suborbital	Missile test	21 September	Successful
21 September	Apogee: 1,350 kilometres (840 mi)					
22 September	(Soviet Union) R-16		(Soviet Union) Baikonur Site 41/4		(Soviet Union) RVSN	
22 September		RVSN	Suborbital	Missile test	22 September	Launch failure
23 September; 20:36	(United States) HGM-25A Titan I		(United States) Vandenberg LC-395A-1		(United States) US Air Force	
23 September; 20:36		US Air Force	Suborbital	Missile test	23 September	Successful
23 September; 20:36	Apogee: 1,000 kilometres (620 mi)					
26 September; 21:56	(United States) Nike-Cajun		(United States) Wallops Island		(United States) US Air Force	
26 September; 21:56		BRL	Suborbital	Aeronomy	26 September	Successful
26 September; 21:56	Apogee: 128 kilometres (80 mi)					
26 September	(United States) MGM-31 Pershing I		(United States) Cape Canaveral LC-30A		(United States) US Army	
26 September		US Army	Suborbital	Missile test	26 September	Successful
26 September	Apogee: 250 kilometres (160 mi)					
26 September	(Soviet Union) R-12 Dvina		(Soviet Union) Kapustin Yar		(Soviet Union) MVS	
26 September		MVS	Suborbital	Missile test	26 September	Successful
26 September	Apogee: 402 kilometres (250 mi)					
26 September	(Soviet Union) R-9 Desna		(Soviet Union) Baikonur Site 51		(Soviet Union) RVSN	
26 September		RVSN	Suborbital	Missile test	26 September	Successful
26 September	Apogee: 1,160 kilometres (720 mi)					
27 September; 00:25	(United Kingdom) Skylark-2		(Australia) Woomera LA-2		(United Kingdom) RAE	
27 September; 00:25		UCL	Suborbital	Ionospheric; Solar	27 September	Successful
27 September; 00:25	Apogee: 153 kilometres (95 mi)					
29 September; 01:52	(United States) HGM-25A Titan I		(United States) Cape Canaveral LC-20		(United States) US Air Force	
29 September; 01:52		US Air Force	Suborbital	Missile test	29 September	Successful
29 September; 01:52	Apogee: 1,000 kilometres (620 mi)					
29 September; 14:00	(United States) UGM-27 Polaris A1		(United States) Cape Canaveral LC-25A		(United States) US Navy	
29 September; 14:00		US Navy	Suborbital	Missile test	29 September	Successful
29 September; 14:00	Apogee: 1,000 kilometres (620 mi)					
30 September; 14:30	(United States) Aerobee-150 (Hi)		(United States) Wallops Island		(United States) NASA	
30 September; 14:30		NASA	Suborbital	Solar	30 September	Successful
30 September; 14:30	Apogee: 223 kilometres (139 mi)					
30 September	(Soviet Union) R-12 Dvina		(Soviet Union) Kapustin Yar		(Soviet Union) MVS	
30 September		MVS	Suborbital	Missile test	30 September	Successful
30 September	Apogee: 402 kilometres (250 mi)					
September	(Soviet Union) R-12 Dvina		(Soviet Union) Kapustin Yar		(Soviet Union) MVS	
September		MVS	Suborbital	Missile test	September	Successful
September	Apogee: 402 kilometres (250 mi)					
September	(Soviet Union) R-14 Usovaya		(Soviet Union) Kapustin Yar		(Soviet Union) RVSN	
September		RVSN	Suborbital	Missile test	September	Successful
September	Apogee: 675 kilometres (419 mi)					
September	(Soviet Union) R-14 Usovaya		(Soviet Union) Kapustin Yar		(Soviet Union) RVSN	
September		RVSN	Suborbital	Missile test	September	Successful
September	Apogee: 675 kilometres (419 mi)					
September	(Soviet Union) R-17 Elbrus		(Soviet Union) Kapustin Yar		(Soviet Union) MVS	
September		MVS	Suborbital	Missile test	September	Successful
September	Apogee: 150 kilometres (93 mi)					
3rd Quarter	(United States) Nike-Zeus		(United States) White Sands LC-38		(United States) US Army	
3rd Quarter		US Army	Suborbital	Missile test	3rd Quarter	Successful
3rd Quarter	Apogee: 150 kilometres (93 mi)					
3rd Quarter	(United States) Nike-Zeus		(United States) White Sands LC-38		(United States) US Army	
3rd Quarter		US Army	Suborbital	Missile test	3rd Quarter	Successful
3rd Quarter	Apogee: 150 kilometres (93 mi)					
=== October ===
2 October; 18:23	(United States) SM-65E Atlas		(United States) Cape Canaveral LC-11		(United States) US Air Force	
2 October; 18:23		US Air Force	Suborbital	Missile test	2 October	Successful
2 October; 18:23	Apogee: 1,500 kilometres (930 mi)					
4 October; 11:19	(United Kingdom) Skylark-2C		(Australia) Woomera LA-2		(United States) NASA	
4 October; 11:19		NASA	Suborbital	UV Astronomy	4 October	Successful
4 October; 11:19	Apogee: 195 kilometres (121 mi)					
4 October; 14:22	(United States) UGM-27 Polaris A2		(United States) USNS Observation Island, ETR		(United States) US Navy	
4 October; 14:22		US Navy	Suborbital	Missile test	4 October	Successful
4 October; 14:22	Apogee: 1,000 kilometres (620 mi)					
4 October	(Soviet Union) R-5A Pobeda		(Soviet Union) Chelkar		(Soviet Union) RVSN	
4 October		RVSN	Suborbital	Target	4 October	Successful
4 October	Apogee: 500 kilometres (310 mi)					
5 October; 13:42	(United States) SM-65E Atlas		(United States) Cape Canaveral LC-13		(United States) US Air Force	
5 October; 13:42		US Air Force	Suborbital	Missile test	5 October	Successful
5 October; 13:42	Apogee: 1,500 kilometres (930 mi)					
5 October; 19:10	(United States) Hi-Hoe		(United States) F4H Phantom II, Point Arguello		(United States) NOTS	
5 October; 19:10		NOTS/NRL	Suborbital	Aeronomy	5 October	Launch failure
5 October; 19:10	Apogee: 10 kilometres (6.2 mi), second stage failed to ignite					
5 October	(France) Daniel		(France) CERES		(France) ONERA	
5 October		ONERA	Suborbital	Aeronomy	5 October	Successful
5 October	Apogee: 130 kilometres (81 mi)					
6 October	(Soviet Union) R-5M Pobeda		(Soviet Union) Kapustin Yar		(Soviet Union) RVSN	
6 October		RVSN	Suborbital	Nuclear test	6 October	Successful
6 October	Apogee: 500 kilometres (310 mi)					
6 October	(Soviet Union) R-9 Desna		(Soviet Union) Baikonur Site 51		(Soviet Union) RVSN	
6 October		RVSN	Suborbital	Missile test	6 October	Successful
6 October	Apogee: 1,160 kilometres (720 mi)					
7 October; 01:30	(United States) HGM-25A Titan I		(United States) Cape Canaveral LC-19		(United States) US Air Force	
7 October; 01:30		US Air Force	Suborbital	Missile test	7 October	Successful
7 October; 01:30	Apogee: 1,000 kilometres (620 mi)					
7 October; 20:03	(United States) Nike-Zeus		(United States) Point Mugu		(United States) US Army	
7 October; 20:03		US Army	Suborbital	Missile test	7 October	Launch failure
7 October; 20:03	Apogee: 3 kilometres (1.9 mi)					
8 October	(Soviet Union) R-9 Desna		(Soviet Union) Baikonur Site 51		(Soviet Union) RVSN	
8 October		RVSN	Suborbital	Missile test	8 October	Launch failure
9 October	(France) Daniel		(France) CERES		(France) ONERA	
9 October		ONERA	Suborbital	Aeronomy	9 October	Successful
9 October	Apogee: 130 kilometres (81 mi)					
9 October	(Soviet Union) R-16U		(Soviet Union) Baikonur Site 41/4		(Soviet Union) RVSN	
9 October		RVSN	Suborbital	Missile test	9 October	Successful
9 October	Apogee: 1,210 kilometres (750 mi)					
10 October; 17:40	(United States) Javelin		(United States) Wallops Island		(United States) NASA	
10 October; 17:40		NASA	Suborbital	Aeronomy	10 October	Successful
10 October; 17:40	Apogee: 1,544 kilometres (959 mi)					
10 October	(United States) MGM-31 Pershing I		(United States) Cape Canaveral LC-30A		(United States) US Army	
10 October		US Army	Suborbital	Missile test	10 October	Successful
10 October	Apogee: 250 kilometres (160 mi)					
11 October	(Soviet Union) R-16U		(Soviet Union) Baikonur Site 41/4		(Soviet Union) RVSN	
11 October		RVSN	Suborbital	Missile test	11 October	Launch failure
12 October; 13:21	(United States) Aerobee-150 (Hi)		(United States) White Sands LC-35		(United States) US Air Force	
12 October; 13:21		US Air Force	Suborbital	Aeronomy	12 October	Successful
12 October; 13:21	Apogee: 192 kilometres (119 mi)					
12 October	(Soviet Union) R-9 Desna		(Soviet Union) Baikonur Site 51		(Soviet Union) RVSN	
12 October		RVSN	Suborbital	Missile test	12 October	Successful
12 October	Apogee: 1,160 kilometres (720 mi)					
14 October; 04:26	(United States) Javelin		(United States) Wallops Island		(United States) NASA	
14 October; 04:26		NASA	Suborbital	Ionospheric	14 October	Successful
14 October; 04:26	Apogee: 1,055 kilometres (656 mi)					
14 October	(United States) Aerobee-150 (Hi)		(United States) White Sands LC-35		(United States) US Air Force	
14 October		ASE	Suborbital	XR astronomy	14 October	Successful
14 October	Apogee: 200 kilometres (120 mi)					
15 October	(Soviet Union) R-16U		(Soviet Union) Baikonur Site 41		(Soviet Union) RVSN	
15 October		RVSN	Suborbital	Missile test	15 October	Successful
15 October	Apogee: 1,210 kilometres (750 mi)					
16 October; 14:54	(United States) UGM-27 Polaris A1		(United States) USS Ethan Allen, ETR		(United States) US Navy	
16 October; 14:54		US Navy	Suborbital	Missile test	16 October	Successful
16 October; 14:54	Apogee: 500 kilometres (310 mi)					
18 October; 13:25	(United States) Aerobee-150A		(United States) Wallops Island		(United States) NASA	
18 October; 13:25		NASA	Suborbital	Technology	18 October	Successful
18 October; 13:25	Apogee: 152 kilometres (94 mi)					
19 October; 17:38	(United States) Scout X-1		(United States) Wallops Island LA-3		(United States) NASA	
19 October; 17:38		NASA	Suborbital	Plasma research Aeronomy	19 October	Successful
19 October; 17:38	Apogee: 6,855 kilometres (4,259 mi)					
19 October	(Soviet Union) R-14 Usovaya		(Soviet Union) Kapustin Yar		(Soviet Union) RVSN	
19 October		RVSN	Suborbital	Missile test	19 October	Successful
19 October	Apogee: 675 kilometres (419 mi)					
20 October	(Soviet Union) R-13		(Soviet Union) Project 611 Submarine, Kola Peninsula		(Soviet Union) RVSN	
20 October		RVSN	Suborbital	Nuclear test	20 October	Successful
20 October	Apogee: 150 kilometres (93 mi)					
21 October	(Soviet Union) R-5A Pobeda		(Soviet Union) Kapustin Yar		(Soviet Union) AN	
21 October		AN	Suborbital	Aeronomy	21 October	Successful
21 October	Apogee: 500 kilometres (310 mi)					
21 October	(Soviet Union) R-5A Pobeda		(Soviet Union) Kapustin Yar		(Soviet Union) AN	
21 October		AN	Suborbital	Aeronomy	21 October	Successful
21 October	Apogee: 500 kilometres (310 mi)					
22 October	(Soviet Union) R-16U		(Soviet Union) Baikonur Site 41		(Soviet Union) RVSN	
22 October		RVSN	Suborbital	Missile test	22 October	Successful
22 October	Apogee: 1,210 kilometres (750 mi)					
22 October	(Soviet Union) R-5 Pobeda		(Soviet Union) Kapustin Yar		(Soviet Union) RVSN	
22 October		RVSN	Suborbital	Target	22 October	Successful
22 October	Apogee: 500 kilometres (310 mi)					
23 October; 16:38:40	(United States) UGM-27 Polaris A2		(United States) USS Ethan Allen, ETR		(United States) US Navy	
23 October; 16:38:40		US Navy	Suborbital	Missile test	23 October	Successful
23 October; 16:38:40	Apogee: 1,000 kilometres (620 mi)					
23 October	(Soviet Union) R-5A Pobeda		(Soviet Union) Chelkar		(Soviet Union) RVSN	
23 October		RVSN	Suborbital	Target	23 October	Successful
23 October	Apogee: 500 kilometres (310 mi)					
23 October	(Soviet Union) R-14 Usovaya		(Soviet Union) Kapustin Yar		(Soviet Union) RVSN	
23 October		RVSN	Suborbital	Missile test	23 October	Launch failure
24 October; 00:23	(United Kingdom) Skylark-2		(Australia) Woomera LA-2		(United Kingdom) RAE	
24 October; 00:23		UCL	Suborbital	Aeronomy; Solar; Meteorite research	24 October	Successful
24 October; 00:23	Apogee: 142 kilometres (88 mi)					
24 October; 03:59	(Japan) Kappa-8		(Japan) Akita		(Japan) ISAS	
24 October; 03:59		ISAS	Suborbital	Ionospheric	24 October	Successful
24 October; 03:59	Apogee: 200 kilometres (120 mi)					
24 October; 23:28	(United States) HGM-25A Titan I		(United States) Cape Canaveral LC-20		(United States) US Air Force	
24 October; 23:28		US Air Force	Suborbital	Missile test	24 October	Successful
24 October; 23:28	Apogee: 1,000 kilometres (620 mi)					
24 October	(Soviet Union) R-5 Pobeda		(Soviet Union) Kapustin Yar		(Soviet Union) RVSN	
24 October		RVSN	Suborbital	Target	24 October	Successful
24 October	Apogee: 500 kilometres (310 mi)					
25 October; 06:59	(United States) Aerobee-150 (Hi)		(United States) White Sands LC-35		(United States) US Air Force	
25 October; 06:59		ASE	Suborbital	XR astronomy	25 October	Successful
25 October; 06:59	Apogee: 232 kilometres (144 mi)					
25 October	(Soviet Union) R-5 Pobeda		(Soviet Union) Kapustin Yar		(Soviet Union) RVSN	
25 October		RVSN	Suborbital	Target	25 October	Launch failure
25 October	Apogee: 100 kilometres (62 mi)					
26 October	(Soviet Union) R-5 Pobeda		(Soviet Union) Kapustin Yar		(Soviet Union) RVSN	
26 October		RVSN	Suborbital	Target	26 October	Launch failure
26 October	Apogee: 100 kilometres (62 mi)					
26 October	(Soviet Union) R-9 Desna		(Soviet Union) Baikonur Site 51		(Soviet Union) RVSN	
26 October		RVSN	Suborbital	Missile test	26 October	Launch failure
27 October; 09:35	(United States) Nike-Cajun		(United States) Wallops Island		(United States) NASA	
27 October; 09:35		GCA	Suborbital	Ionospheric	27 October	Successful
27 October; 09:35	Apogee: 148 kilometres (92 mi)					
27 October; 15:06:04	(United States) Saturn C-1 (Saturn I)		(United States) Cape Canaveral LC-34		(United States) NASA	
27 October; 15:06:04	(United States) SA-1	NASA	Suborbital	Test flight	27 October	Successful
27 October; 15:06:04	Apogee: 136 kilometres (85 mi), maiden flight of Saturn I, flew with battleship upper stages					
27 October	(Soviet Union) R-5M Pobeda		(Soviet Union) Kapustin Yar		(Soviet Union) RVSN	
27 October		RVSN	Suborbital	Nuclear test	27 October	Successful
27 October	Apogee: 300 kilometres (190 mi)					
27 October	(Soviet Union) R-5M Pobeda		(Soviet Union) Kapustin Yar		(Soviet Union) RVSN	
27 October		RVSN	Suborbital	Nuclear test	27 October	Successful
27 October	Apogee: 180 kilometres (110 mi)					
28 October	(Soviet Union) R-16U		(Soviet Union) Baikonur Site 41		(Soviet Union) RVSN	
28 October		RVSN	Suborbital	Missile test	28 October	Successful
28 October	Apogee: 1,210 kilometres (750 mi)					
28 October	(Soviet Union) R-5 Pobeda		(Soviet Union) Kapustin Yar		(Soviet Union) RVSN	
28 October		RVSN	Suborbital	Target	28 October	Successful
28 October	Apogee: 500 kilometres (310 mi)					
29 October	(Soviet Union) R-16		(Soviet Union) Baikonur Site 41		(Soviet Union) RVSN	
29 October		RVSN	Suborbital	Missile test	29 October	Successful
29 October	Apogee: 1,210 kilometres (750 mi)					
30 October; 11:13	(Japan) Kappa-8		(Japan) Akita		(Japan) ISAS	
30 October; 11:13		ISAS	Suborbital	Ionospheric	30 October	Successful
30 October; 11:13	Apogee: 175 kilometres (109 mi)					
31 October	(Soviet Union) R-12 Dvina		(Soviet Union) Kapustin Yar		(Soviet Union) MVS	
31 October		MVS	Suborbital	Missile test	31 October	Successful
31 October	Apogee: 402 kilometres (250 mi)					
31 October	(Soviet Union) R-14 Usovaya		(Soviet Union) Kapustin Yar		(Soviet Union) RVSN	
31 October		RVSN	Suborbital	Missile test	31 October	Successful
31 October	Apogee: 675 kilometres (419 mi)					
October	(Soviet Union) R-12 Dvina		(Soviet Union) Kapustin Yar		(Soviet Union) MVS	
October		MVS	Suborbital	Missile test	October	Successful
October	Apogee: 402 kilometres (250 mi)					
October	(Soviet Union) R-12 Dvina		(Soviet Union) Kapustin Yar		(Soviet Union) MVS	
October		MVS	Suborbital	Missile test	October	Successful
October	Apogee: 402 kilometres (250 mi)					
October	(Soviet Union) R-12 Dvina		(Soviet Union) Kapustin Yar		(Soviet Union) MVS	
October		MVS	Suborbital	Missile test	October	Successful
October	Apogee: 402 kilometres (250 mi)					
October	(Soviet Union) R-12 Dvina		(Soviet Union) Kapustin Yar		(Soviet Union) MVS	
October		MVS	Suborbital	Missile test	October	Successful
October	Apogee: 402 kilometres (250 mi)					
October	(Soviet Union) R-12 Dvina		(Soviet Union) Kapustin Yar		(Soviet Union) MVS	
October		MVS	Suborbital	Missile test	October	Successful
October	Apogee: 402 kilometres (250 mi)					
October	(Soviet Union) R-12 Dvina		(Soviet Union) Kapustin Yar		(Soviet Union) MVS	
October		MVS	Suborbital	Missile test	October	Successful
October	Apogee: 402 kilometres (250 mi)					
October	(Soviet Union) R-12 Dvina		(Soviet Union) Kapustin Yar		(Soviet Union) MVS	
October		MVS	Suborbital	Missile test	October	Successful
October	Apogee: 402 kilometres (250 mi)					
October	(Soviet Union) R-12 Dvina		(Soviet Union) Kapustin Yar		(Soviet Union) MVS	
October		MVS	Suborbital	Missile test	October	Successful
October	Apogee: 402 kilometres (250 mi)					
October	(Soviet Union) R-12 Dvina		(Soviet Union) Kapustin Yar		(Soviet Union) MVS	
October		MVS	Suborbital	Missile test	October	Successful
October	Apogee: 402 kilometres (250 mi)					
October	(Soviet Union) R-12 Dvina		(Soviet Union) Kapustin Yar		(Soviet Union) MVS	
October		MVS	Suborbital	Missile test	October	Successful
October	Apogee: 402 kilometres (250 mi)					
October	(Soviet Union) R-12 Dvina		(Soviet Union) Kapustin Yar		(Soviet Union) MVS	
October		MVS	Suborbital	Missile test	October	Successful
October	Apogee: 402 kilometres (250 mi)					
=== November ===
1 November; 03:00	(United States) Aerobee-150 (Hi)		(United States) White Sands LC-35		(United States) NRL	
1 November; 03:00		NRL	Suborbital	Aeronomy	1 November	Successful
1 November; 03:00	Apogee: 212 kilometres (132 mi)					
1 November; 17:56	(United Kingdom) Skylark-2C		(Australia) Woomera LA-2		(United States) NASA	
1 November; 17:56		NASA	Suborbital	UV Astronomy	1 November	Successful
1 November; 17:56	Apogee: 193 kilometres (120 mi)					
2 November	(United States) MGM-31 Pershing I		(United States) Cape Canaveral LC-30A		(United States) US Army	
2 November		US Army	Suborbital	Missile test	2 November	Successful
2 November	Apogee: 250 kilometres (160 mi)					
3 November; 14:01:32	(United States) UGM-27 Polaris A1		(United States) USS Ethan Allen, ETR		(United States) US Navy	
3 November; 14:01:32		US Navy	Suborbital	Missile test	3 November	Successful
3 November; 14:01:32	Apogee: 500 kilometres (310 mi)					
3 November; 15:30	(United States) UGM-27 Polaris A1		(United States) USS Ethan Allen, ETR		(United States) US Navy	
3 November; 15:30		US Navy	Suborbital	Missile test	3 November	Successful
3 November; 15:30	Apogee: 500 kilometres (310 mi)					
3 November; 17:00	(United States) UGM-27 Polaris A1		(United States) USS Ethan Allen, ETR		(United States) US Navy	
3 November; 17:00		US Navy	Suborbital	Missile test	3 November	Successful
3 November; 17:00	Apogee: 500 kilometres (310 mi)					
8 November; 09:00	(United Kingdom) Skylark-2		(Australia) Woomera LA-2		(United Kingdom) RAE	
8 November; 09:00		UCL	Suborbital	Aeronomy; Ionospheric	8 November	Successful
8 November; 09:00	Apogee: 152 kilometres (94 mi)					
8 November; 16:10	(United States) UGM-27 Polaris A2		(United States) USS Ethan Allen, ETR		(United States) US Navy	
8 November; 16:10		US Navy	Suborbital	Missile test	8 November	Successful
8 November; 16:10	Apogee: 1,000 kilometres (620 mi)					
9 November	(United States) UGM-27 Polaris A2		(United States) Cape Canaveral LC-29A		(United States) US Navy	
9 November		US Navy	Suborbital	Missile test	9 November	Successful
9 November	Apogee: 1,000 kilometres (620 mi)					
10 November; 14:55	(United States) SM-65E Atlas		(United States) Cape Canaveral LC-13		(United States) US Air Force	
10 November; 14:55		US Air Force	Suborbital	Cosmic ray research Biological	10 November	Launch failure
10 November; 14:55	Apogee: 10 kilometres (6.2 mi), carried a squirrel monkey, engine failed early in ascent					
15 November; 13:00	(Soviet Union) R-5 Pobeda		(Soviet Union) Kapustin Yar		(Soviet Union) AN	
15 November; 13:00		AN	Suborbital	Aeronomy; Ionospheric	15 November	Successful
15 November; 13:00	Apogee: 430 kilometres (270 mi)					
15 November; 13:42	(United States) Journeyman		(United States) Point Arguello LC-A		(United States) NASA	
15 November; 13:42		NASA	Suborbital	Biological	15 November	Successful
15 November; 13:42	Apogee: 1,057 kilometres (657 mi)					
15 November	(United States) Asp-Apache		(United States) Kwajalein			
15 November		NMSU	Suborbital	Aeronomy	15 November	Successful
15 November	Apogee: 100 kilometres (62 mi)					
15 November	(United States) MGM-31 Pershing I		(United States) Cape Canaveral LC-30A		(United States) US Army	
15 November		US Army	Suborbital	Missile test	15 November	Successful
15 November	Apogee: 250 kilometres (160 mi)					
15 November	(United States) Nike-Zeus		(United States) White Sands LC-38		(United States) US Army	
15 November		US Army	Suborbital	Missile test	15 November	Successful
15 November	Apogee: 150 kilometres (93 mi)					
15 November	(United States) Nike-Zeus		(United States) White Sands LC-38		(United States) US Army	
15 November		US Army	Suborbital	Missile test	15 November	Successful
15 November	Apogee: 150 kilometres (93 mi)					
16 November; 20:37	(United States) Nike-Zeus		(United States) Point Mugu		(United States) US Army	
16 November; 20:37		US Army	Suborbital	Missile test	16 November	Successful
16 November; 20:37	Apogee: 150 kilometres (93 mi)					
17 November; 15:15	(United States) LGM-30A Minuteman IA		(United States) Cape Canaveral LC-32B		(United States) US Air Force	
17 November; 15:15		US Air Force	Suborbital	Missile test	17 November	Successful
17 November; 15:15	Apogee: 1,300 kilometres (810 mi)					
17 November; 16:06	(United States) Javelin		(United States) Wallops Island		(United States) US Air Force	
17 November; 16:06		US Air Force	Suborbital	Aeronomy	17 November	Successful
17 November; 16:06	Apogee: 610 kilometres (380 mi)					
18 November; 06:30	(United States) Nike-Cajun		(United States) Wallops Island		(United States) NASA	
18 November; 06:30		NASA	Suborbital	Aeronomy	18 November	Successful
18 November; 06:30	Apogee: 142 kilometres (88 mi)					
18 November; 13:42	(United States) Journeyman		(United States) Point Arguello LC-A		(United States) NASA	
18 November; 13:42		NASA	Suborbital	Biological	18 November	Successful
18 November; 13:42	Apogee: 1,057 kilometres (657 mi)					
20 November; 18:04	(United Kingdom) Skylark-2C		(Australia) Woomera LA-2		(United States) NASA	
20 November; 18:04		NASA	Suborbital	UV Astronomy	20 November	Successful
20 November; 18:04	Apogee: 209 kilometres (130 mi)					
21 November; 19:00	(United States) Nike-Zeus 3		(United States) Point Mugu		(United States) US Army	
21 November; 19:00		US Army	Suborbital	Missile test	21 November	Successful
21 November; 19:00	Apogee: 150 kilometres (93 mi)					
21 November	(United Kingdom) Skylark-5C		(Australia) Woomera LA-2		(United Kingdom) RAE	
21 November		UCL/RAE	Suborbital	Ionospheric; Solar	21 November	Launch failure
22 November; 00:30	(United States) HGM-25A Titan I		(United States) Cape Canaveral LC-20		(United States) US Air Force	
22 November; 00:30		US Air Force	Suborbital	Missile test	22 November	Successful
22 November; 00:30	Apogee: 1,000 kilometres (620 mi)					
22 November; 21:04	(United States) SM-65F Atlas		(United States) Cape Canaveral LC-11		(United States) US Air Force	
22 November; 21:04		US Air Force	Suborbital	Ionospheric; Aeronomy	22 November	Successful
22 November; 21:04	Apogee: 1,400 kilometres (870 mi)					
25 November	(Soviet Union) R-12 Dvina		(Soviet Union) Kapustin Yar		(Soviet Union) MVS	
25 November		MVS	Suborbital	Missile test	25 November	Successful
25 November	Apogee: 402 kilometres (250 mi)					
25 November	(Soviet Union) R-14 Usovaya		(Soviet Union) Kapustin Yar		(Soviet Union) RVSN	
25 November		RVSN	Suborbital	Missile test	25 November	Successful
25 November	Apogee: 675 kilometres (419 mi)					
29 November; 23:01:49	(United States) SM-65D Atlas		(United States) Vandenberg LC-576B-2		(United States) Strategic Air Command	
29 November; 23:01:49		Strategic Air Command	Suborbital	Missile test	29 November	Successful
29 November; 23:01:49	Apogee: 1,800 kilometres (1,100 mi)					
29 November	(Soviet Union) R-14 Usovaya		(Soviet Union) Kapustin Yar		(Soviet Union) RVSN	
29 November		RVSN	Suborbital	Missile test	29 November	Successful
29 November	Apogee: 675 kilometres (419 mi)					
29 November	(Soviet Union) R-16		(Soviet Union) Baikonur Site 41		(Soviet Union) RVSN	
29 November		RVSN	Suborbital	Missile test	29 November	Successful
29 November	Apogee: 1,210 kilometres (750 mi)					
29 November	(Soviet Union) R-7A Semyorka		(Soviet Union) Baikonur		(Soviet Union) RVSN	
29 November		RVSN	Suborbital	Missile test	29 November	Successful
29 November	Apogee: 1,350 kilometres (840 mi)					
29 November	(United States) HGM-25A Titan I		(United States) Cape Canaveral LC-19		(United States) US Air Force	
29 November		US Air Force	Suborbital	Missile test	29 November	Successful
29 November	Apogee: 1,000 kilometres (620 mi)					
30 November; 17:10	(United States) Aerobee-150 (Hi)		(United States) White Sands LC-35		(United States) NRL	
30 November; 17:10		NRL	Suborbital	Solar	30 November	Successful
30 November; 17:10	Apogee: 238 kilometres (148 mi)					
30 November	(United States) Nike-Zeus 3		(United States) White Sands LC-38		(United States) US Army	
30 November		US Army	Suborbital	Missile test	30 November	Successful
30 November	Apogee: 150 kilometres (93 mi)					
=== December ===
1 December; 20:40	(United States) SM-65E Atlas		(United States) Cape Canaveral LC-13		(United States) US Air Force	
1 December; 20:40		US Air Force	Suborbital	Missile test	1 December	Successful
1 December; 20:40	Apogee: 1,600 kilometres (990 mi)					
1 December	(United States) MGM-31 Pershing I		(United States) Cape Canaveral LC-30A		(United States) US Army	
1 December		US Army	Suborbital	Missile test	1 December	Successful
1 December	Apogee: 250 kilometres (160 mi)					
1 December	(United States) UGM-27 Polaris A2		(United States) Cape Canaveral LC-29A		(United States) US Navy	
1 December		US Navy	Suborbital	Missile test	1 December	Successful
1 December	Apogee: 1,000 kilometres (620 mi)					
1 December	(Soviet Union) R-14 Usovaya		(Soviet Union) Kapustin Yar		(Soviet Union) RVSN	
1 December		RVSN	Suborbital	Missile test	1 December	Successful
1 December	Apogee: 675 kilometres (419 mi)					
2 December	(Soviet Union) R-12 Dvina		(Soviet Union) Kapustin Yar		(Soviet Union) MVS	
2 December		MVS	Suborbital	Missile test	2 December	Successful
2 December	Apogee: 402 kilometres (250 mi)					
2 December	(Soviet Union) R-16		(Soviet Union) Baikonur Site 41		(Soviet Union) RVSN	
2 December		RVSN	Suborbital	Missile test	2 December	Launch failure
4 December; 04:00:16	(United States) XRM-91 Blue Scout Junior		(United States) Point Arguello LC-A		(United States) US Air Force	
4 December; 04:00:16		US Air Force	Suborbital	Magnetospheric	4 December	Successful
4 December; 04:00:16	Apogee: 44,400 kilometres (27,600 mi)					
4 December	(Soviet Union) R-14 Usovaya		(Soviet Union) Kapustin Yar		(Soviet Union) RVSN	
4 December		RVSN	Suborbital	Missile test	4 December	Successful
4 December	Apogee: 675 kilometres (419 mi)					
5 December; 23:26	(United Kingdom) Skylark-2C		(Australia) Woomera LA-2		(United Kingdom) RAE	
5 December; 23:26		Birmingham/UCL	Suborbital	Ionospheric; Solar	5 December	Successful
5 December; 23:26	Apogee: 226 kilometres (140 mi)					
5 December	(United States) UGM-27 Polaris A1		(United States) Cape Canaveral LC-25A		(United States) US Navy	
5 December		US Navy	Suborbital	Missile test	5 December	Successful
5 December	Apogee: 500 kilometres (310 mi)					
6 December; 01:30	(United States) PGM-17 Thor DM-18A		(United States) Vandenberg LE-8		(United Kingdom) Royal Air Force	
6 December; 01:30		Royal Air Force	Suborbital	Missile test	6 December	Successful
6 December; 01:30	Apogee: 520 kilometres (320 mi)					
6 December; 22:37	(United States) PGM-19 Jupiter		(United States) Cape Canaveral LC-26A		(United States) US Army	
6 December; 22:37		US Army	Suborbital	Missile test	6 December	Successful
6 December; 22:37	Apogee: 500 kilometres (310 mi)					
6 December	(France) Centaure		(France) Reggane		(France) CNES	
6 December		CNRS	Suborbital	Aeronomy	6 December	Successful
6 December	Apogee: 130 kilometres (81 mi)					
6 December	(France) Centaure		(France) Hammaguira Bacchus		(France) CNES	
6 December		CNRS	Suborbital	Aeronomy	6 December	Successful
6 December	Apogee: 130 kilometres (81 mi)					
7 December; 21:18:36	(United States) SM-65D Atlas		(United States) Vandenberg LC-576B-3		(United States) Strategic Air Command	
7 December; 21:18:36		Strategic Air Command	Suborbital	Missile test	7 December	Successful
7 December; 21:18:36	Apogee: 1,800 kilometres (1,100 mi)					
7 December; 23:15	(United States) Aerobee-150 (Hi)		(United States) Eglin		(United States) US Air Force	
7 December; 23:15		US Air Force	Suborbital	Aeronomy; Ionospheric	7 December	Successful
7 December; 23:15	Apogee: 234 kilometres (145 mi)					
8 December	(Soviet Union) R-14 Usovaya		(Soviet Union) Kapustin Yar		(Soviet Union) RVSN	
8 December		RVSN	Suborbital	Missile test	8 December	Successful
8 December	Apogee: 675 kilometres (419 mi)					
8 December	(United States) Astrobee-1500		(United States) Point Arguello LC-A		(United States) US Air Force	
8 December		US Air Force	Suborbital	Geodesy	8 December	Successful
8 December	Apogee: 2,190 kilometres (1,360 mi)					
9 December	(France) Centaure		(France) Reggane		(France) CNES	
9 December		CNRS	Suborbital	Aeronomy	9 December	Successful
9 December	Apogee: 130 kilometres (81 mi)					
9 December	(France) Centaure		(France) Hammaguira Bacchus		(France) CNES	
9 December		CNRS	Suborbital	Aeronomy	9 December	Successful
9 December	Apogee: 130 kilometres (81 mi)					
9 December	(France) Centaure		(France) Hammaguira Bacchus		(France) CNES	
9 December		CNRS	Suborbital	Aeronomy	9 December	Successful
9 December	Apogee: 130 kilometres (81 mi)					
10 December; 17:01	(United States) Nike-Cajun		(Canada) Churchill		(United States) NASA	
10 December; 17:01		NASA	Suborbital	Cosmic ray research	10 December	Successful
10 December; 17:01	Apogee: 132 kilometres (82 mi)					
12 December; 20:16	(United States) SM-65F Atlas		(United States) Cape Canaveral LC-11		(United States) US Air Force	
12 December; 20:16		US Air Force	Suborbital	Missile test	12 December	Launch failure
12 December; 20:16	Apogee: 1,000 kilometres (620 mi), guidance system failed					
13 December; 12:00	(United States) Aerobee-150 (Hi)		(United States) White Sands LC-35		(United States) US Air Force	
13 December; 12:00		US Air Force	Suborbital	Meteorite research	13 December	Successful
13 December; 12:00	Apogee: 246 kilometres (153 mi)					
13 December	(United States) HGM-25A Titan I		(United States) Cape Canaveral LC-20		(United States) US Air Force	
13 December		US Air Force	Suborbital	Missile test	13 December	Successful
13 December	Apogee: 1,000 kilometres (620 mi)					
14 December; 07:09	(United States) Trailblazer 2		(United States) Wallops Island		(United States) NASA	
14 December; 07:09		NASA	Suborbital	REV Test	14 December	Successful
14 December; 07:09	Apogee: 157 kilometres (98 mi)					
14 December; 10:29	(United States) HAD		(Australia) Woomera LA-2		(Australia) WRE	
14 December; 10:29		WRE	Suborbital	Aeronomy	14 December	Successful
14 December; 10:29	Apogee: 130 kilometres (81 mi)					
14 December; 20:00	(United States) Nike-Zeus 3		(United States) Kwajalein		(United States) US Army	
14 December; 20:00		US Army	Suborbital	Missile test	14 December	Successful
14 December; 20:00	Apogee: 150 kilometres (93 mi)					
14 December; 20:26	(United States) Nike-Zeus		(United States) Point Mugu		(United States) US Army	
14 December; 20:26		US Army	Suborbital	Missile test	14 December	Successful
14 December; 20:26	Apogee: 150 kilometres (93 mi)					
14 December	(Soviet Union) R-14 Usovaya		(Soviet Union) Kapustin Yar		(Soviet Union) RVSN	
14 December		RVSN	Suborbital	Missile test	14 December	Launch failure
15 December; 17:00	(United States) Aerobee-150 (Hi)		(United States) White Sands LC-35		(United States) US Air Force	
15 December; 17:00		US Air Force	Suborbital	Solar	15 December	Successful
15 December; 17:00	Apogee: 169 kilometres (105 mi)					
15 December	(United States) HGM-25A Titan I		(United States) Cape Canaveral LC-19		(United States) US Air Force	
15 December		US Air Force	Suborbital	Missile test	15 December	Successful
15 December	Apogee: 1,000 kilometres (620 mi)					
18 December; 13:04	(United States) LGM-30A Minuteman IA		(United States) Cape Canaveral LC-31B		(United States) US Air Force	
18 December; 13:04		US Air Force	Suborbital	Missile test	18 December	Successful
18 December; 13:04	Apogee: 1,300 kilometres (810 mi)					
20 December; 03:32	(United States) SM-65E Atlas		(United States) Cape Canaveral LC-13		(United States) US Air Force	
20 December; 03:32		US Air Force	Suborbital	Cosmic ray research	20 December	Successful
20 December; 03:32	Apogee: 1,800 kilometres (1,100 mi)					
21 December; 03:35	(United States) SM-65F Atlas		(United States) Cape Canaveral LC-11		(United States) US Air Force	
21 December; 03:35		US Air Force	Suborbital	Cosmic ray research Ionospheric; Meteorite research	21 December	Launch failure
21 December; 03:35	Apogee: 500 kilometres (310 mi), hydraulic system failed					
21 December; 19:54	(United States) Nike-Cajun		(United States) Wallops Island		(United States) NASA	
21 December; 19:54		Michigan	Suborbital	Aeronomy	21 December	Successful
21 December; 19:54	Apogee: 132 kilometres (82 mi)					
22 December; 04:24	(United States) Aerobee-300A		(United States) Wallops Island		(United States) NASA	
22 December; 04:24		Michigan	Suborbital	Ionospheric	22 December	Successful
22 December; 04:24	Apogee: 365 kilometres (227 mi)					
23 December	(Soviet Union) R-12 Dvina		(Soviet Union) Kapustin Yar		(Soviet Union) MVS	
23 December		MVS	Suborbital	Missile test	23 December	Successful
23 December	Apogee: 402 kilometres (250 mi)					
23 December	(Soviet Union) R-5A Pobeda		(Soviet Union) Chelkar		(Soviet Union) RVSN	
23 December		RVSN	Suborbital	Target	23 December	Successful
23 December	Apogee: 500 kilometres (310 mi)					
26 December; 05:05	(Japan) Kappa-9L		(Japan) Akita		(Japan) ISAS	
26 December; 05:05		ISAS	Suborbital	Test flight	26 December	Successful
26 December; 05:05	Apogee: 343 kilometres (213 mi)					
26 December	(Soviet Union) R-5A Pobeda		(Soviet Union) Chelkar		(Soviet Union) RVSN	
26 December		RVSN	Suborbital	Target	26 December	Successful
26 December	Apogee: 500 kilometres (310 mi)					
26 December	(Soviet Union) R-5A Pobeda		(Soviet Union) Chelkar		(Soviet Union) RVSN	
26 December		RVSN	Suborbital	Target	26 December	Successful
26 December	Apogee: 500 kilometres (310 mi)					
26 December	(Soviet Union) R-14 Usovaya		(Soviet Union) Kapustin Yar		(Soviet Union) RVSN	
26 December		RVSN	Suborbital	Missile test	26 December	Launch failure
27 December	(Soviet Union) R-12 Dvina		(Soviet Union) Vladimirovka PL-1		(Soviet Union) RVSN	
27 December		RVSN	Suborbital	REV Test	27 December	Successful
27 December	Apogee: 405 kilometres (252 mi)					
28 December	(United States) MGM-31 Pershing I		(United States) Cape Canaveral LC-30A		(United States) US Army	
28 December		US Army	Suborbital	Missile test	28 December	Successful
28 December	Apogee: 250 kilometres (160 mi)					
29 December	(Soviet Union) R-12 Dvina		(Soviet Union) Kapustin Yar		(Soviet Union) MVS	
29 December		MVS	Suborbital	Missile test	29 December	Successful
29 December	Apogee: 402 kilometres (250 mi)					
29 December	(Soviet Union) R-5A Pobeda		(Soviet Union) Chelkar		(Soviet Union) RVSN	
29 December		RVSN	Suborbital	Target	29 December	Successful
29 December	Apogee: 500 kilometres (310 mi)					
29 December	(Soviet Union) R-5A Pobeda		(Soviet Union) Chelkar		(Soviet Union) RVSN	
29 December		RVSN	Suborbital	Target	29 December	Successful
29 December	Apogee: 500 kilometres (310 mi)					
30 December	(Soviet Union) R-12 Dvina		(Soviet Union) Kapustin Yar		(Soviet Union) MVS	
30 December		MVS	Suborbital	Missile test	30 December	Successful
30 December	Apogee: 402 kilometres (250 mi)					
30 December	(Soviet Union) R-5A Pobeda		(Soviet Union) Chelkar		(Soviet Union) RVSN	
30 December		RVSN	Suborbital	Target	30 December	Successful
30 December	Apogee: 500 kilometres (310 mi)					
December	(Soviet Union) R-12 Dvina		(Soviet Union) Kapustin Yar		(Soviet Union) MVS	
December		MVS	Suborbital	Missile test	December	Successful
December	Apogee: 402 kilometres (250 mi)					
December	(Soviet Union) R-12 Dvina		(Soviet Union) Kapustin Yar		(Soviet Union) MVS	
December		MVS	Suborbital	Missile test	December	Successful
December	Apogee: 402 kilometres (250 mi)					
Unknown	(United States) Jaguar		(United States) B-57A Canberra, White Sands		(United States) US Air Force	
Unknown		US Air Force	Suborbital	Aeronomy	Unknown	Successful
Unknown	Apogee: 800 kilometres (500 mi)					
Unknown	(United States) Sparoair II		(United States) F3H Demon, Point Mugu		(United States) US Navy	
Unknown		US Navy	Suborbital	Test flight		
Unknown	Apogee: 100 kilometres (62 mi)					
Unknown	(United States) Sparoair II		(United States) F3H Demon, Point Mugu		(United States) US Navy	
Unknown		US Navy	Suborbital	Test flight		
Unknown	Apogee: 100 kilometres (62 mi)					

- ← Jan
- Feb
- Mar
- Apr
- May
- Jun
- Jul
- Aug
- Sep
- Oct
- Nov
- Dec →
