= Samos 3 =

American satellite

- Mission type: Reconnaissance
- Operator: US Air Force
- Mission duration: 4 months (planned); Failed to orbit

Spacecraft properties
- Spacecraft type: Samos-E2
- Bus: Agena-B

Start of mission
- Launch date: 9 September 1961, 19:28:27 UTC
- Rocket: Atlas LV-3A Agena-B
- Launch site: Point Arguello LC-1-1

Orbital parameters
- Reference system: Geocentric
- Regime: Sun-synchronous low Earth (planned)

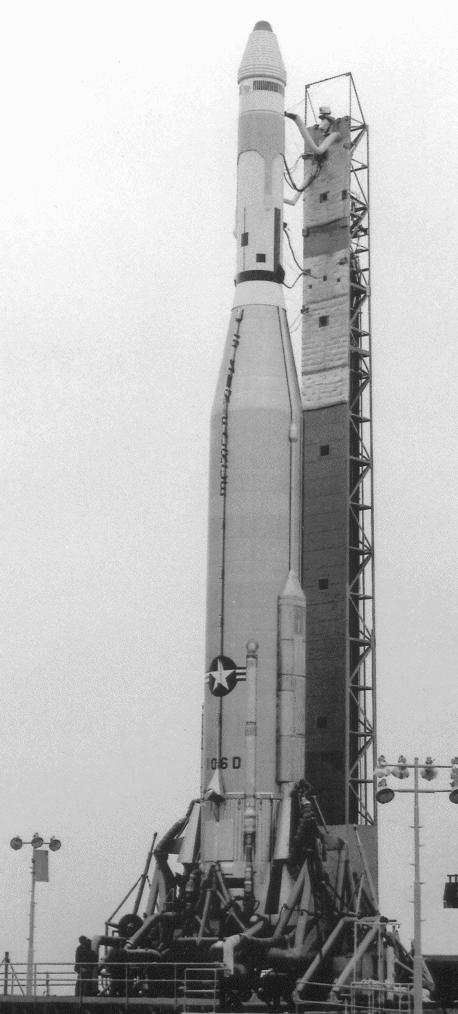
Atlas Agena B with SAMOS 3 (Sep. 9, 1961)

Samos 3 was an American reconnaissance satellite that was lost in a launch failure in 1961. It was an early electro-optical reconnaissance spacecraft, meaning that it transmitted images to receiving stations on Earth rather than returning them in a film capsule, and it was intended to operate as part of the Samos programme. Samos 3 was the only Samos-E2 spacecraft to be launched. Samos-E2 satellites were based on the Agena-B platform and carried a camera with a focal length of 91 centimetres (36 in) and a ground resolution of 6 metres (20 ft).

The launch of Samos 3 occurred at 19:28 UTC on 9 September 1961. An Atlas LV-3A Agena-B rocket was used, flying from Launch Complex 1-1 at Point Arguello Naval Air Station. At the moment of liftoff, one of the launch tower umbilicals detached 0.21 seconds late. This tripped a switch in the Atlas, causing it to change from internal to external power. As a result, the booster's engines shut down, and the vehicle fell back onto the pad and exploded, destroying the satellite and causing extensive damage to the launch complex.

Samos 3 was intended to operate in a Sun-synchronous low Earth orbit at an altitude of 480 kilometres (300 mi) with an inclination of 83 degrees. The satellite had a mass of around 1,900 kilograms (4,200 lb), and was designed to operate for around four months. Damage to SLC3 mainly affected electrical and plumbing components and repair work began almost immediately. The pad was back online to host the launch of Samos 4 in November. Samos 3 was the last DOD-related launch to be unclassified, and afterwards, much greater secrecy would be put around such flights.
