= FTV-2203 =

American reconnaissance satellite

- Mission type: Reconnaissance
- Operator: US Air Force
- Harvard designation: 1962 Alpha Lambda 1
- COSPAR ID: 1961-035A
- SATCAT no.: 00218
- Mission duration: 15-30 days (planned)

Spacecraft properties
- Spacecraft type: Samos-E5

Start of mission
- Launch date: 22 December 1961, 19:12:33 UTC
- Rocket: Atlas LV-3A Agena-B 114D
- Launch site: Point Arguello LC-1-2

End of mission
- Disposal: Failed deorbit
- Deactivated: December 1961
- Decay date: 31 December 1961

Orbital parameters
- Reference system: Geocentric
- Regime: Low Earth
- Eccentricity: 0.0334
- Perigee altitude: 244 kilometers (152 mi)
- Apogee altitude: 702 kilometers (436 mi)
- Inclination: 89.2 degrees
- Period: 94.5 minutes
- Epoch: 22 December 1961, 14:12:00 UTC

FTV-2203, also known as Samos 5, was an American reconnaissance satellite launched in 1961 as part of the Samos programme. It was a film return reconnaissance spacecraft, meaning that it returned images in a film capsule at the end of its mission. FTV-2203 was a Samos-E5 spacecraft, based on the Agena-B. It carried a camera with a focal length of 1.67 metres (5 ft 6 in) and a resolution of 1.5 metres (4 ft 11 in).

== The launch ==
The launch of FTV-2203 occurred at 19:12:33 UTC on 22 December 1961. An Atlas LV-3A Agena-B rocket was used, flying from Launch Complex 1-2 at the Point Arguello Naval Air Station. During the launch, the first stage sustainer engine failed to shut down on time, and instead burned until all of its oxidiser had been depleted. As a result, the spacecraft reached a higher orbit than had been planned. It was assigned the Harvard designation 1961 Alpha Lambda 1.

Following launch, FTV-2203 was in a low Earth orbit with an apogee of 650 kilometres (400 mi), a perigee of 230 kilometres (140 mi), and 89.6 degrees of inclination. Within a few days of launch, it was commanded to deorbit in order to return its film capsule. This was conducted, however due to the additional altitude provided by the anomaly during launch, it was unable to fully deorbit. The burn lowered its orbit, and it reentered the atmosphere on 31 December 1961. The film capsule, which had separated following the attempted deorbit burn, decayed on 9 January 1962. The satellite had a mass of 2,580 kilograms (5,690 lb), and measured 10.21 metres (33.5 ft) in length, with a diameter of 1.52 metres (5 ft 0 in).
