= Samos 4 =

- Mission type: Reconnaissance
- Operator: US Air Force
- Mission duration: 15-30 days (planned); Failed to orbit

Spacecraft properties
- Spacecraft type: Samos-E5
- Bus: Agena-B

Start of mission
- Launch date: 22 November 1961, 20:45:47 UTC
- Rocket: Atlas LV-3A Agena-B 108D
- Launch site: Point Arguello LC-1-1

Orbital parameters
- Reference system: Geocentric
- Regime: Sun-synchronous low Earth
- Epoch: Planned

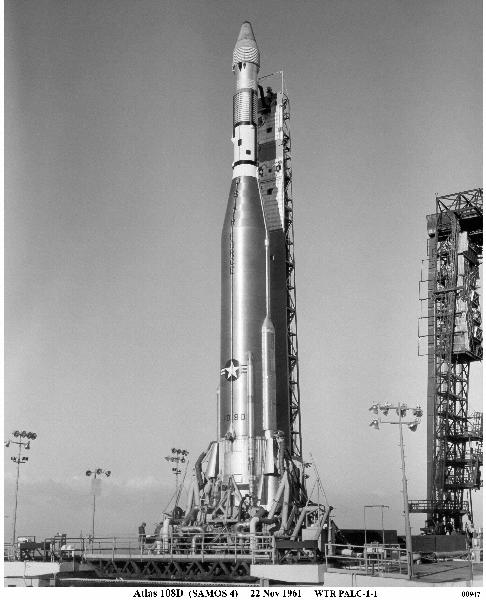
Atlas Agena B with Samos 4

Samos 4 was an American reconnaissance satellite which was lost in a launch failure in 1961. It was a film-return reconnaissance spacecraft, meaning that it returned images in a film capsule at the end of its mission. It was operated as part of the Samos programme. Samos 4 was the first of three Samos-E5 spacecraft to be launched; Samos-E5 satellites were based on an Agena-B, and carried a camera with a focal length of 1.67 metres (5 ft 6 in), and a resolution of 1.5 metres (4 ft 11 in).

The launch of Samos 4 occurred at 20:45:47 UTC on 22 November 1961. An Atlas LV-3A Agena-B rocket was used, flying from Launch Complex 1-1 at the Point Arguello Naval Air Station. Four minutes and four seconds into the flight, the rocket's first stage attitude control system malfunctioned, and control over the rocket's pitch was lost. The rest of the flight proceeded nominally, but, by the time the second stage ignited, it had pitched up by 160 degrees and was hence facing in the wrong direction. Its three-minute-41-second burn reduced the vehicle's velocity instead of increasing it, and as a result the satellite failed to achieve orbit. Samos 4 was to have operated in a Sun-synchronous low Earth orbit. It was designed to operate for between 15 and 30 days.
