= Vandenberg Probe Launch Complex C =

Probe Launch Complex C
- Interactive map of Probe Launch Complex C
- Launch site: Vandenberg Space Force Base
- Location: 34.6095°N 120.6284°W
- Short name: PLC-C
- Operator: US Air Force
- Total launches: 6
- Launch pad: 1
Launch history
- Status: Inactive
- Launches: 6
- First launch: 29 June 1971
- Last launch: 12 December 1975
- Associated rockets: Aerobee-170; Tomahawk

Probe Launch Complex C or PLC-C at the Vandenberg Space Force Base in California, United States, is a launch complex which was used for six sounding rocket launches between 1971 and 1975. It was originally built as Launch Complex C or LC-C at the Point Arguello Naval Air Station, however no launches were made from the site whilst it was part of Point Arguello. Following the merger of Point Arguello into Vandenberg in 1964, it was briefly designated PALC-C, and subsequently Probe Launch Complex C.

== Launch history ==
Six launches occurred from Probe Launch Complex C. The first four launches used Aerobee-170 rockets, whilst the last two used Tomahawks. Five of the launches reached space, with the exception of the third Aerobee, which failed early in its flight. The Aerobee launches conducted tests of infrared sensors for anti-ballistic missile systems, whilst the Tomahawks were used for aeronomy research.

Date/Time (GMT)	Rocket	Mission	Outcome	Apogee	Remarks
29 June 1971, 13:10	Aerobee-170	Chaser-1	Success	161 kilometres (100 mi)	
24 November 1971, 06:15	Aerobee-170	Chaser-2	Success	145 kilometres (90 mi)	
20 June 1972, 16:45	Aerobee-170	Chaser-3	Failure	8 kilometres (5.0 mi)	
11 October 1972, 11:31	Aerobee-170	Chaser-4	Success	151 kilometres (94 mi)	
15 August 1975, 05:21	Tomahawk	Escape I	Success	272 kilometres (169 mi)	
12 December 1975, 05:09	Tomahawk	Escape II	Success	164 kilometres (102 mi)	
