= Vandenberg Launch Emplacement 8 =

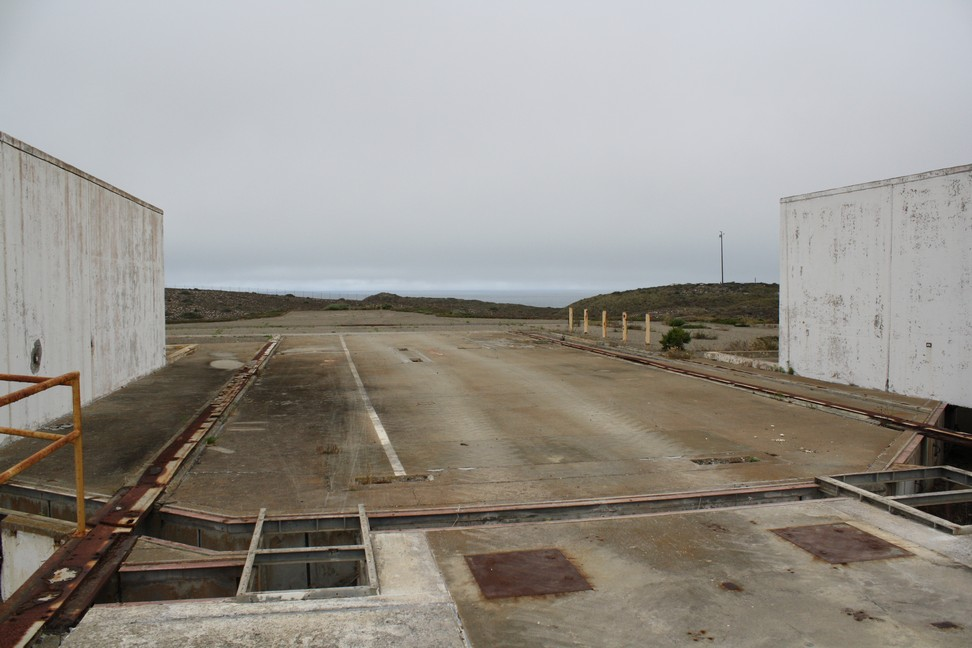
- Launch site: Vandenberg Space Force Base, California, US
- Location: 34.766354°N 120.622720°W
- Short name: LE-8
- Operator: United States Air Force
- Launch pad(s): 1
Launch history
- Status: Abandoned
- Launches: None
- Associated rockets: Thor IRBM

The Launch Emplacement 8 (LE-8) is a former United States Air Force intercontinental ballistic missile launch facility at Vandenberg Space Force Base, California, United States.
