= Point Arguello =

Landform in Santa Barbara County, California

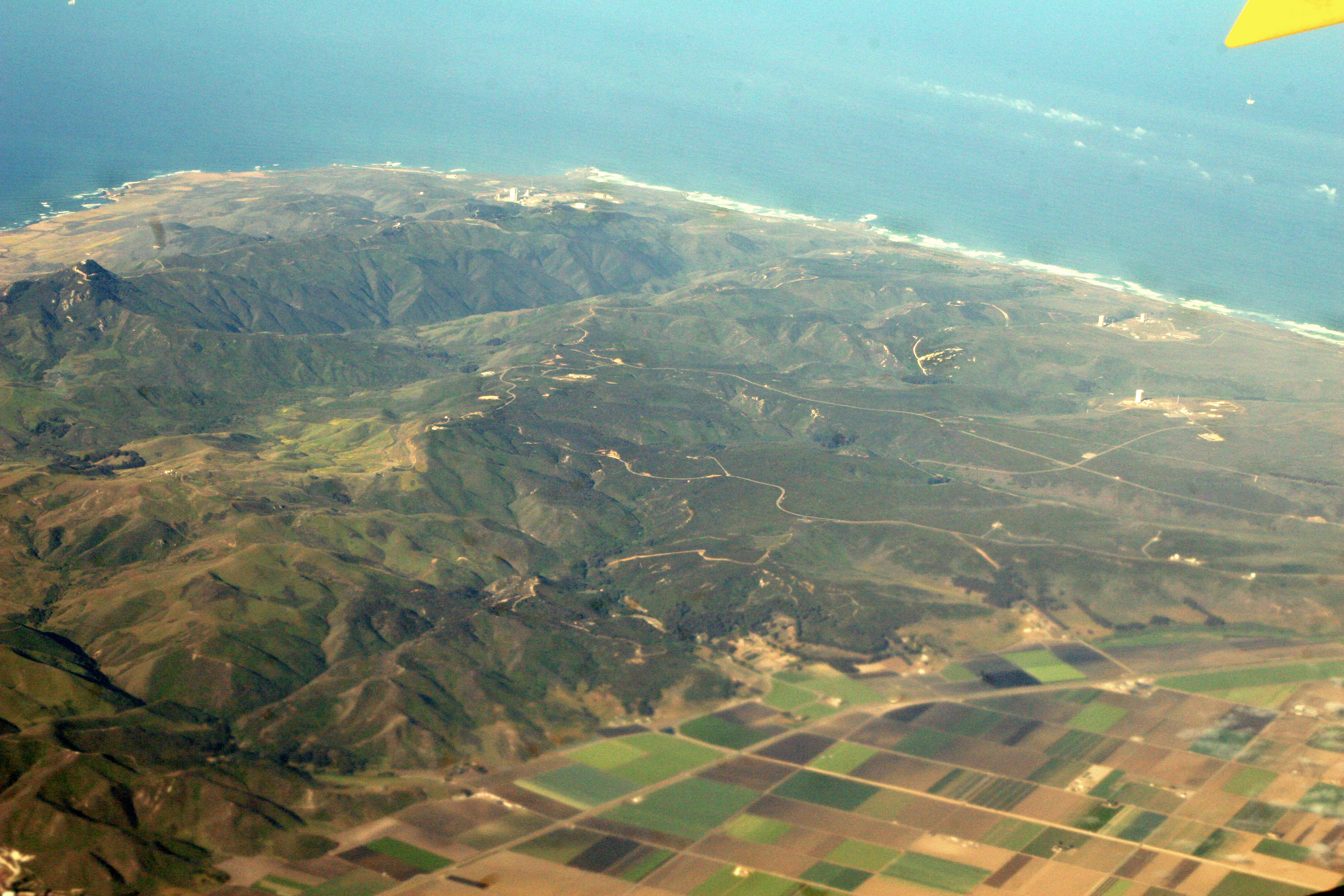
Point Arguello

Point Arguello (Spanish: Punta Argüello) is a headland on the Gaviota Coast, in Santa Barbara County, California, near the city of Lompoc. The area was first used by the United States Navy in 1959 for the launch of military and sounding rockets. It was transferred to the United States Air Force in 1964, at which time it became part of Vandenberg Air Force Base.

== History ==
In 1769, the Spanish Portola expedition became the first Europeans to explore this area by land. Soldiers of the expedition named a nearby point Los Pedernales or Punta Pedernales, because they found flints there. The point was given that name on some early maps, but in 1792 British naval explorer George Vancouver dubbed it Point Arguello for José Darío Argüello, a Spanish frontier soldier who was Commandant of the Presidio of Santa Barbara and acting governor of Alta California.

USS Edith wrecked off Point Argüello in 1849.

A High-frequency direction finding (HFDF) was established here by the Navy during World War II. These radio intercept sites along the coast could track Japanese warships and merchant marine vessels as far away as the Western Pacific. The other stations in California were at Farallon Islands, Point Saint George, and San Diego. Bainbridge Island, Washington also hosted a station.

== Launch pads ==
Rockets listed in italics were launched from the complex after its transfer to Vandenberg Air Force Base in 1964.

Original Designation	Later Designation (Vandenberg Air Force Base, from 1966)	Rockets
LC-1-1	SLC-3W	Atlas-Agena; Thor-Agena; Thorad-Agena; Atlas E/F
LC-1-2	SLC-3E	Atlas-Agena; Atlas E/F; Atlas H Atlas IIAS; Atlas V
LC-2-3	SLC-4W	Atlas-Agena; Titan IIIB; Titan 23G
LC-2-4	SLC-4E	Atlas-Agena; Titan IIID; Titan 34D; Titan IV; Falcon 9
PALC-A	N/A	Sounding rockets
PALC-B	N/A	Sounding rockets
LC-C	PLC-C	Sounding rockets
PALC-D	SLC-5	Scout

=== PALC-A ===
Launch Complex A or LC-A at the Point Arguello Naval Air Station in California, United States, subsequently Point Arguello Launch Complex A or PALC-A at the Vandenberg Air Force Base, is a launch complex that was used for a number of sounding rocket launches between 1959 and 1966. It was originally built as Launch Complex A or LC-A at the Point Arguello Naval Air Station, and was subsequently transferred to Vandenberg Air Force Base as PALC-A following the merger of Point Arguello into Vandenberg AFB in 1964.

Point Arguello Launch Complex A
- Interactive map of Point Arguello Launch Complex A
- Launch site: Point Arguello; Vandenberg
- Location: 34.6791°N 120.5922°W
- Short name: LC-A, PALC-A
- Operator: US Air Force
- Total launches: 39
- Launch pad: One
Launch history
- Status: Inactive
- First launch: 14 July 1959
- Last launch: 25 March 1966
- Associated rockets: Blue Scout Junior; Astrobee-1500; Black Brant III; DAC Roc; Honest John-Nike-Nike; Javelin; Journeyman; Nike-Asp; Seagull

Blue Scout Junior, Astrobee, Black Brant, DAC Roc, Honest John-Nike-Nike, Javelin, Journeyman, Nike-Asp and Seagull rockets were launched from the complex whilst it was active.

==== Launch history ====
Date/Time (GMT)	Rocket	Mission	Remarks
14 July 1959, 17:45	Nike-Asp		
17 July 1959, 17:40	Nike-Asp		Failed
24 July 1959, 16:34	Nike-Asp		
7 August 1959, 17:05	Nike-Asp		
14 August 1959, 16:00	Nike-Asp		
22 August 1959, 02:30	Nike-Asp		
24 August 1959, 22:47	Nike-Asp		
28 August 1959, 16:10	Nike-Asp		
31 August 1959, 22:53	Nike-Asp		
1 September 1959, 01:01	Nike-Asp		
1 September 1959, 19:00	Nike-Asp		
2 September 1959, 00:03	Nike-Asp		
19 September 1960, 16:35	Journeyman		
1 August 1961, 20:18	Astrobee-1500		
15 November 1961, 13:42	Journeyman		
18 November 1961, 13:42	Journeyman		
4 December 1961, 04:00	Blue Scout Junior	O-2	
8 December 1961	Astrobee-1500		
31 May 1962, 17:08	Blue Scout Junior SLV-1C	ERCS 279L-1	
9 July 1962	Journeyman		
24 July 1962, 17:29	Blue Scout Junior SLV-1C	ERCS 279L-2	
21 November 1962, 18:20	Blue Scout Junior SLV-1C	ERCS 279L-3	
19 December 1962	Blue Scout Junior SLV-1B		
2 February 1963, 06:56	Blue Scout Jr SLV-1C	ERCS 279L-4	
12 February 1963, 01:47	Journeyman		
14 March 1963, 01:01	Blue Scout Junior SLV-1C	ERCS 279L-5	
17 May 1963, 23:00	Blue Scout Junior SLV-1C	ERCS 279L-6	
1 July 1963	Black Brant III		
24 October 1963	DAC Roc		
7 November 1963	Black Brant III		
18 November 1963	Honest John-Nike-Nike	HAD-1	
10 December 1963	DAC Roc		
20 December 1963	Seagull		
6 February 1964	Honest John-Nike-Nike	HAD-2	Failed
14 March 1964	Honest John-Nike-Nike	HAD-3	
29 August 1964, 09:36	Blue Scout Junior SLV-1B		
22 December 1964, 04:00	Blue Scout Junior		Failed - premature third stage cutoff
19 March 1966, 12:31	Javelin	HITAB-1	
25 March 1966, 09:42	Javelin	HITAB-2	

=== PALC-B ===
Launch Complex B or LC-B at the Point Arguello Naval Air Station in California, United States was a launch complex which was used for twenty three sounding rocket launches between 1960 and 1963. Astrobee-1500, Deacon-Arrow, Kiva-Hopi, Nike-Cajun, Nike-Viper, Terrier-Asp rockets were launched from the complex whilst it was active.

Launch Complex B
- Interactive map of Launch Complex B
- Launch site: Point Arguello
- Location: 34.6697°N 120.5993°W
- Short name: LC-B
- Operator: US Air Force
- Total launches: 23
- Launch pad: One
Launch history
- Status: Inactive
- First launch: 4 February 1960
- Last launch: 11 May 1963
- Associated rockets: Astrobee-1500; Deacon-Arrow; Kiva-Hopi; Nike-Cajun; Nike-Viper; Terrier-Asp

The complex was transferred to the Vandenberg Air Force Base as a result of a merger between it and Point Arguello in 1964, however by that time it was already inactive.

==== Launch history ====
Date/Time (GMT)	Rocket	Mission	Remarks
4 February 1960	Nike-Viper		
29 April 1960	Nike-Viper		
27 June 1960	Nike-Viper		
1 July 1960	Deacon-Arrow		
8 July 1960	Deacon-Arrow		
14 July 1960	Deacon-Arrow		
20 July 1960	Nike-Cajun		
12 August 1960	Kiva-Hopi		
30 September 1960	Nike-Viper		
12 October 1960	Kiva-Hopi		
27 October 1960	Kiva-Hopi		
21 November 1960	Nike-Cajun		
22 November 1960	Nike-Cajun		
6 December 1960, 18:44	Kiva-Hopi		
14 December 1960	Kiva-Hopi		
14 December 1960	Kiva-Hopi		
16 December 1960	Kiva-Hopi		
27 March 1961	Deacon-Arrow		
14 March 1962	Terrier-Asp		
9 July 1962	Astrobee-1500		Failed
5 August 1962	Kiva-Hopi		
13 December 1962	Terrier-Asp		
11 May 1963	Kiva-Hopi		

== See also ==
- Point Arguello Light
- Honda Point disaster
