= Samos (satellite) =

Series of reconnaissance satellites for the United States

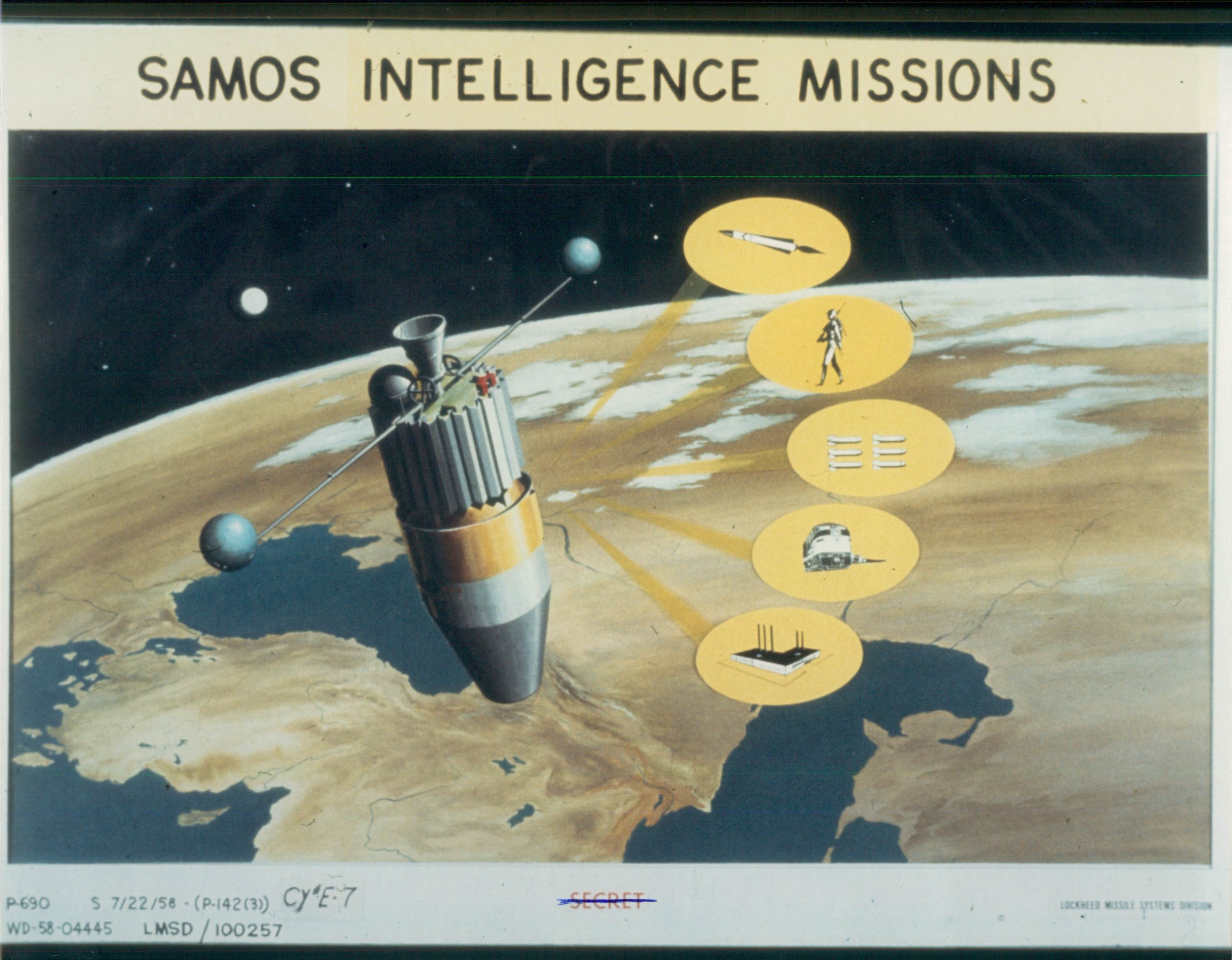
An artist impression of SAMOS photoreconnaissance missions.

The SAMOS (misidentified as Satellite and Missile Observation System) or SAMOS-E program was a relatively short-lived series of reconnaissance satellites for the United States in the early 1960s, also used as a cover for the initial development of the KH-7 GAMBIT system. Reconnaissance was performed with film cameras and television surveillance from polar low Earth orbits with film canister returns and transmittals over the United States. SAMOS was first launched in 1960 from Vandenberg Air Force Base.

SAMOS was also known by the unclassified terms Program 101 and Program 201.

== History ==
=== Background ===
==== WS-117L and costs ====
SAMOS started as part of the WS-117L satellite reconnaissance and protection program of the United States Air Force in 1956. In May 1958, the Department of Defense directed the transfer of the WS-117L program to ARPA. Significant parts of the SAMOS development program were SAMOS-E (optical reconnaissance), SAMOS-F (ELINT Ferret reconnaissance).

In FY1958, WS-117L was funded by the Air Force at a level of US$ 108.2 million (inflation adjusted US$ 1.21 billion in 2025). For SAMOS, USAF, and ARPA spent a combined sum of US$82.9 million in FY1959 (inflation adjusted US$ 0.92 billion in 2025) and US$163.9 million in FY1960 (inflation adjusted US$ 1.78 billion in 2025).

==== CORONA and SAMOS ====
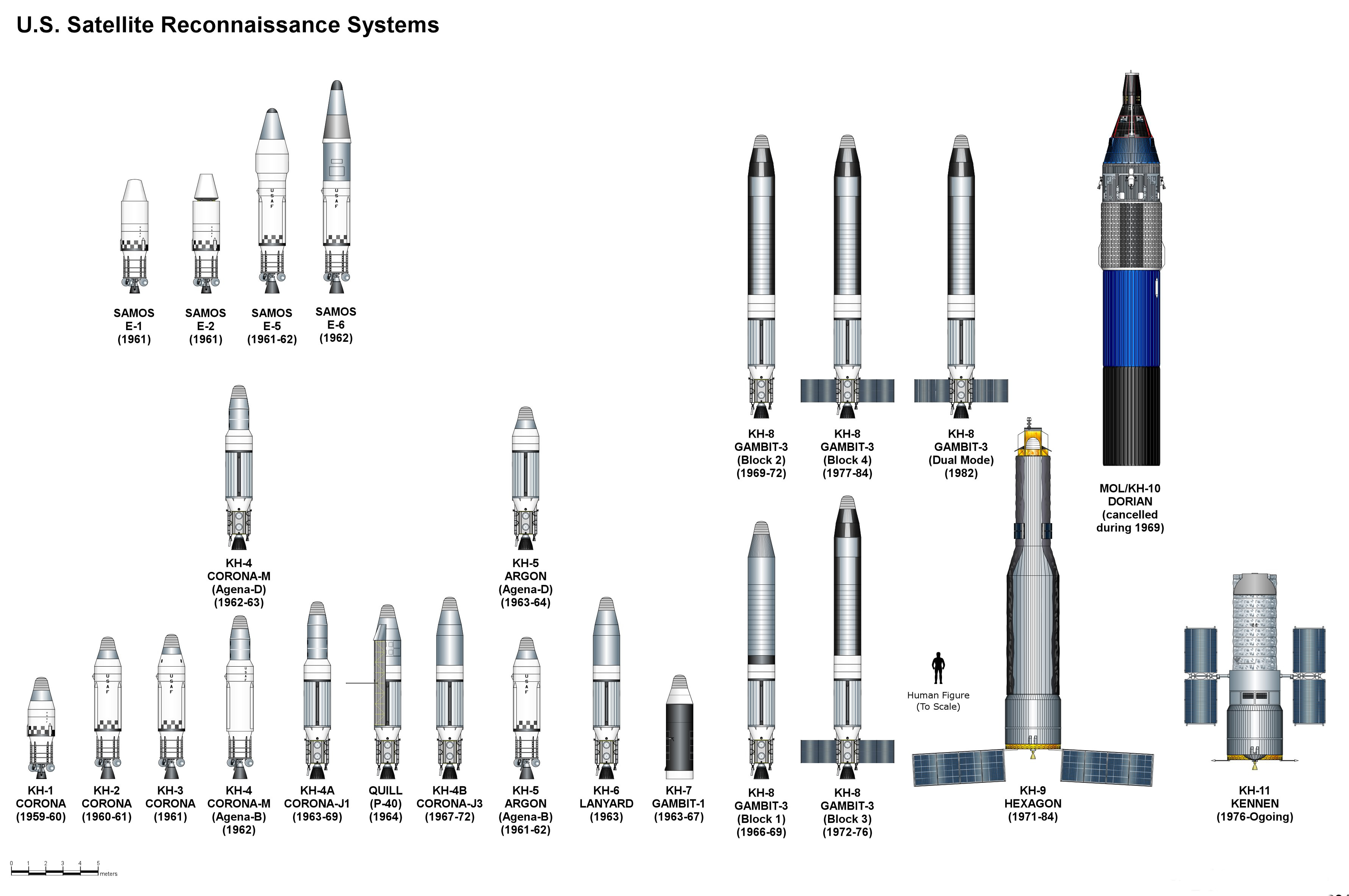
U.S. reconnaissance satellites: SAMOS at the top left and CORONA at the bottom left.

During this period, the rival CORONA program, which saw its first launch in February 1959, began operation. SAMOS emerged as a more advanced satellite with additional capabilities that due to its larger mass would be launched on the Atlas-Agena booster instead of the Thor-Agena. While CORONA took photographs and returned them to Earth in a film capsule, SAMOS would instead electronically scan its film and beam images down by radio link.

While CORONA began flying in 1959, the reliability of the program for its first three years was abysmal and a backup reconnaissance program was needed. Moreover, the fear of the "missile gap" with the Soviet Union was very great, with space successes and boasts by Soviet politicians seeming to hint that the USSR not only had a large arsenal of nuclear missiles on hand, but were quite willing to use them. The US ballistic missile arsenal in 1960 consisted of a handful of Atlas ICBMs that were exposed to Soviet attack, took a long time to prepare for launch, and whose test flight record did not inspire much confidence. The Thor and Jupiter IRBMs stationed in the UK, Italy, and Turkey were not much of an improvement, also their bases could be attacked by Soviet bombers. Intelligence on Soviet missile activities was considered vital, but the only viable option, U-2 reconnaissance flights, had been halted by the Gary Powers shootdown in May 1960. Unbeknownst to the Pentagon, Soviet missiles were deployed in far smaller numbers than generally believed and their reliability was no better than any US missile. The initial SAMOS satellites were known as Program 101 and were merely a test model designed to verify the operability of the photo-optical camera system.

==== Name and secrecy ====
"Samos" was the name of a Greek island and the name was picked with the belief that nobody would associate it with reconnaissance. However, a mistaken rumor later emerged that the name was an acronym for "Satellite And Missile Observation System". President Eisenhower was adamant about cultivating the image that the US space program was only for peaceful purposes. The Air Force for a while managed to create the fiction that Discoverer was a series of scientific satellites, but SAMOS's real purpose was known from the beginning, and efforts to not link it to Discoverer were made. Although the existence and mission purpose of SAMOS was publicly acknowledged until the fall of 1961, the Air Force did not release detailed information about the satellites or exactly what they were doing during their missions.

=== SAMOS 1 ===
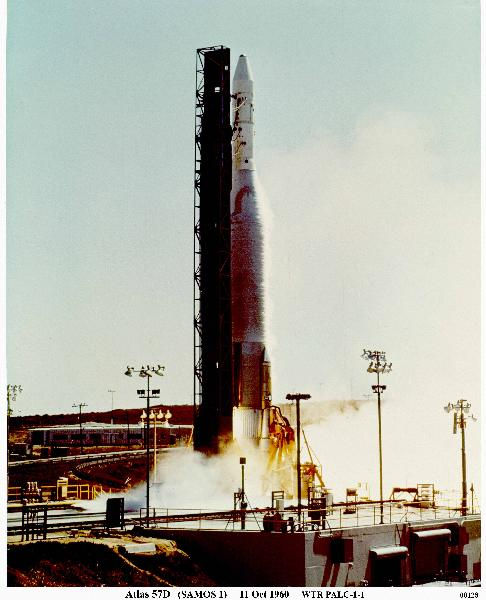
Atlas LV-3 Agena-A with SAMOS 1

SAMOS 1 launch took place from PALC 1-1 (Point Arguello Launch Complex - later absorbed into the main launch center at Vandenberg Air Force Base) at 20:34 GMT on 11 October 1960, using Atlas LV-3 Agena-A vehicle 57D and Agena 2101. The Atlas lifted smoothly and steered downrange, as the weather was clear and cloudless, visibility was excellent and the launch vehicle could be seen until after booster section separation. Initial jubilation at the successful launch turned to dismay when the real-time telemetry readouts showed that the nitrogen pressure gas for the Agena-A's attitude control jets was gone. Without this, the stage could not be stabilized for ignition so that after separation from the Atlas, the Agena-A was left with no attitude control. Telemetry indicated an erratic attitude rate and abnormal gimbaling of the Bell XLR-81 engine. The Agena-A burn lasted 123 seconds, slightly longer than nominal, but tracking stations in VAFB, Kodiak Island, and Hawaii found no indication that orbit had been achieved, and it was concluded that the vehicle had reentered and broken up over an unknown point in the Pacific Ocean. The postflight analysis also found that the Atlas guidance system had malfunctioned in flight, due to either a failure of the rate beacon or waveguide antenna, but the guidance system was not telemetered so an exact cause could not be determined. The guidance system was unable to generate any steering or programmed engine cutoff commands, however, backup signals from the missile programmer managed to ensure a proper flight path and on-time engine cutoff. The Agena-A malfunction was traced to a technician installing a pad umbilical release lanyard improperly, which resulted in the Agena-A nitrogen quick fill line being ripped out at liftoff. Film and photographs of the launch clearly showed the gas escaping. At Agena engine ignition, the performance was also below normal, suggesting damage to the pneumatic system as well.

The major objective of the SAMOS 1 mission was to determine the engineering feasibility of obtaining ground observation capability from an orbiting satellite. It launched on 11 October 1960 at 20:34 GMT from the Pacific Missile Range in Point Arguello, California. The first stage separated at 249.9 seconds after liftoff. The Agena-A second stage ignited at 506.7 seconds and cutoff at 629.3 seconds, as planned, but a loss of nitrogen gas pressure had disrupted the guidance and control systems at 123 seconds, resulting in poor trajectory and failure to orbit the payload. Tracking telemetry was lost prior to the Agena-A ignition, so the exact trajectory was unknown. SAMOS 1 was the first satellite in the series SAMOS launched by the US Air Force from Vandenberg Air Force Base aboard an Atlas Agena-A rocket. It was a first-generation photo surveillance satellite intended to radio relay images back to Earth but loss of nitrogen gas pressure disrupted the guidance and control systems, causing a second stage failure. No data were returned. The payload comprised photographic and related test equipment, telemetry, radiation, tracking, and command instrumentation. The payload was housed in the Agena second stage. The entire stage was designed to go into orbit. The stage, including payload and casing, had a planned orbital mass of 1,845 kg. It was a 6.7 meter high, 1.5-meter diameter cylinder. The first stage was a modified Atlas ICBM. The full rocket was 30.2 m high with a base diameter of 3.05 m and a liftoff mass of approximately 124 000 kg.

=== SAMOS 2 ===
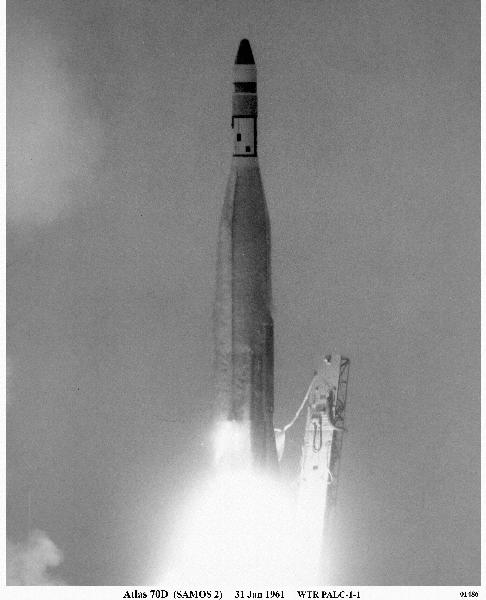
Atlas LV-3 Agena-A with SAMOS 2

SAMOS 2 was launched on 31 January 1961, on Atlas 70D and Agena 2102. Unlike with SAMOS 1, the weather was foggy and gray, and the pad was not even visible from the blockhouse. This time, everything worked perfectly and SAMOS 2 achieved orbit. The F-1 ferret system was tested first, followed by the E-1 electro-optical cameras, which transmitted images of approximately 30.5 m of resolution. On-orbit 21, ground controllers sent the command to jettison the F-1 antenna, which was partially obstructing the camera, in the hopes of even better images. However, something went disastrously wrong when all telemetry signals from SAMOS 2 ceased. It was believed that the separation mechanism for the F-1 antenna had caused the partial or complete disintegration of the satellite vehicle. SAMOS 2 remained in orbit until it decayed into the atmosphere on 21 October 1971.

SAMOS 2 was launched from the Pacific Missile Range at 20:24:00 GMT, into a near-circular polar orbit of 474 x 557 km, 94.97 min of revolution, and 97.4° of inclination, to determine the capability for making observations of space, the atmosphere, and the nature of the globe from satellites. The 1 860 kg spacecraft was a cylinder 6.7 m long and 1.5 m in diameter, and it comprised the entire Agena-A second stage. Included in the instrumentation were photographic and associated test equipment, acoustical (Microphone Density Gauge) micrometeorite detection apparatus, a plasma probe, and an electric field meter. The computer on board was digital-to-analog. Telemetry, tracking, and command equipment completed the payload. Details about the satellite's transmitter were not announced. A conical nose cap detached from the satellite casing and remained in orbit. The expected lifetime of the satellite was 15 years, and the expected lifetime of the nose cap was 12 years.

The next attempt did not take place for seven months, because of the switch to the larger Agena-B second stage that could be restarted in orbit and the operational Program 101A satellites, which had a more advanced camera system with better resolution and a wider field of view. SAMOS satellites after SAMOS 2 also sported a large "mushroom cap" nose cone, as early plans had envisioned flying a crewed capsule similar to Project Mercury.

=== SAMOS 3 ===
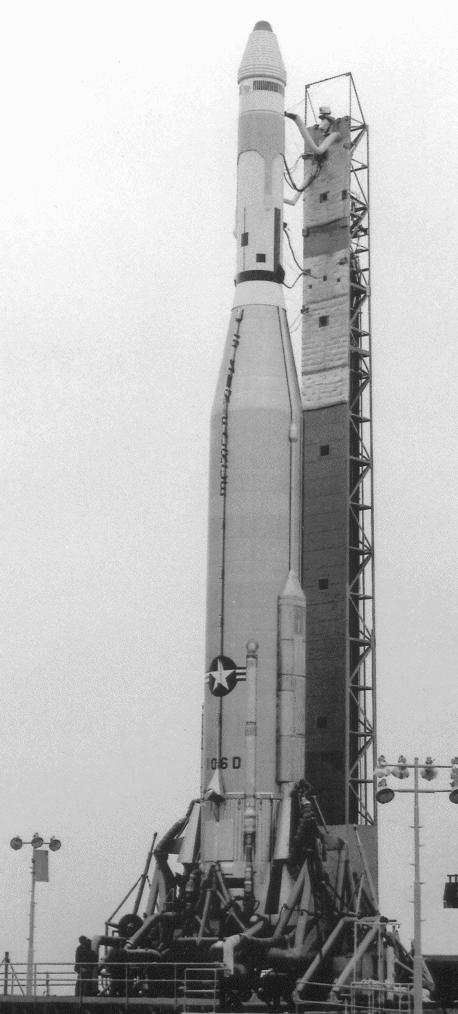
Atlas LV-3 Agena-B with SAMOS 3

The SAMOS 3 launch was a complete disaster. SAMOS 3 lifted from PALC 1-1 on 9 September 1961 at 00:00:00 GMT, was a US Air Force first-generation photo surveillance satellite with 7 instruments on board but the Atlas LV-3 Agena-B booster's engines shut down after the rocket had ascended about 29 cm and it fell back onto the pad in an enormous fireball. Postflight investigation found that an umbilical on PALC 1-1 had not detached on time, resulting in the booster being switched from internal to external power, but since the power umbilicals on the pad had already detached, the result was a complete loss of electrical power to all Atlas systems. The accident necessitated improved procedures to umbilical lanyard installation, and modifications to the launcher system to prevent the hold-down arms from releasing the launch vehicle until all umbilicals had detached.

After SAMOS 3, it was decided to abandon the Program 101/101A satellites entirely and switch to a more conventional film recovery capsule, since the one successful mission had not proven the viability of the electro-optical camera system. While the 101/101A satellites separated from the Agena-B in orbit, the 101B would remain attached and would use it for orbital maneuvers and also deorbiting the film capsule at the end of the mission.

Several more 101/101A satellites were either completed or in a state of partial completion when the program was called off, but the problem of how to dispose of them was never satisfactorily solved. Most were left mothballed in warehouses or scrapped. There was talk of giving the camera systems to NASA for the planetary probe program, but they were of doubtful value for taking photographs of the Moon. The Agena stages that could not be repurposed for other programs were scrapped.

The 101B satellites were originally intended to use an encrypted communications system out of paranoia that the Soviets could not only intercept transmissions, but even reprogram the satellite to land on their territory. Unlike CORONA, the 101B satellites would land with the complete camera system, not just the film capsule, and the Pentagon and State Department dreaded the consequences of a landing on Soviet territory. Ultimately, the encrypted communication requirement was dropped in October 1961, a mere month before the first 101B satellite launched.

As it turned out, PALC 1-1 was not seriously damaged by the explosion of SAMOS 3's booster and repair work only consisted of plumbing and electrical equipment, replacing the launcher mechanism, and cleaning and repainting. By 29 October, the pad was fully restored to working condition.

=== SAMOS 4 ===
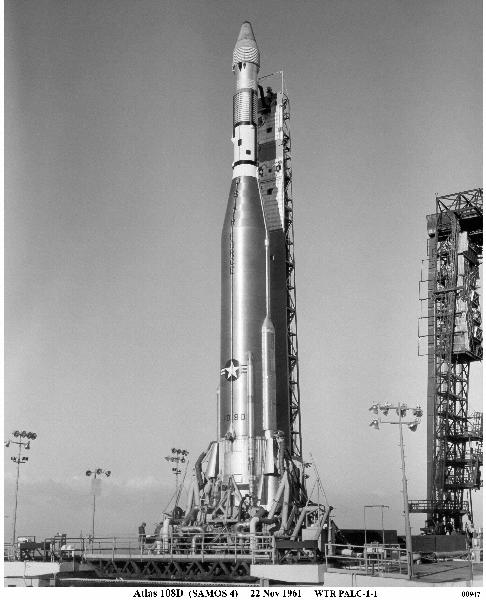
Atlas LV-3 Agena-B with SAMOS 4

On 22 November 1961 at 00:00:00 GMT, SAMOS 4, the first Program 101B satellite, was a US Air Force first-generation photo surveillance satellite, lifted off. Extensive efforts were made to ensure mission success, such as X-ray testing for bad transistors and super-clean propellant tanks. Unfortunately, the launch was another failure, albeit less dramatic than SAMOS 3. The Atlas suffered a guidance malfunction at T+245 seconds into launch that resulted in loss of pitch control, as well as improper booster and sustainer cutoff signals. Booster jettison happened a few seconds early, while the sustainer engine burned to LOX depletion. The booster pitched up about 160° at SECO, leaving the Agena oriented in the wrong direction for orbital insertion, so when its engine fired, it drove SAMOS 4 into the Pacific Ocean instead of orbit.

It was believed that the improper pitch signals on SAMOS 4's launch vehicle had been caused by the accidental separation of a heat shield covering the retrorockets on the Atlas equipment pods. This would have caused aerodynamic heating of the pitch gyro, and the failure was extremely similar to an incident that occurred during the launch of MIDAS 4 a month earlier, and it led to redesigned heat shields over the retrorockets. The guidance system tracking beacon had also failed in flight, causing the absence of programmed BECO/SECO commands.

SAMOS 4 was the first fully top-secret DoD space mission, as President Kennedy had issued an executive order putting all DoD space programs under strict secrecy. The Air Force announcement said nothing other than that a satellite had been launched on 22 November from PALC 1-1 on an Atlas-Agena B vehicle. SAMOS 4's failure to orbit also went unannounced, although since the Air Force never confirmed that it reached orbit, space program observers quickly guessed that the launch was not a success.

The next two Program 101B satellites contained several technical improvements, such as more sophisticated telemetry and control/communications systems and improved cameras.

=== SAMOS 5 ===
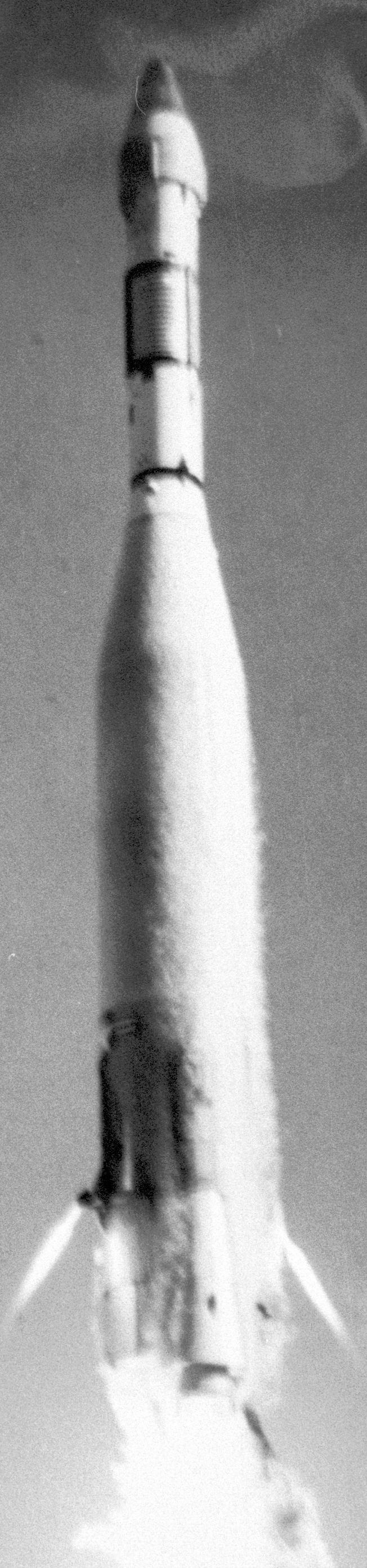
Atlas LV-3 Agena-B with SAMOS 5

SAMOS 5 was launched on 22 December 1961 at 19:12:00 GMT, was a first-generation, low-resolution photo surveillance spacecraft, once again with nothing but a brief statement by the Air Force about a launch taking place aboard an Atlas-Agena B from PALC 1-1. Space program observers noted that this time around, the Air Force statement did report the satellite as having attained orbit. Indeed, it did, but the Atlas malfunctioned yet again. This time, the sustainer engine did not cut off on schedule and continued operating until LOX depletion, putting the satellite into a high orbit, which resulted in the deorbit maneuver failing (although given that reentry would have taken place over densely populated New England, this was not necessarily a bad thing). The reentry command had activated all systems in the satellite, quickly draining the batteries. With the loss of electrical power, the parachutes could not be deployed during reentry, and also since the retrorockets had been expended during the failed deorbit maneuver, SAMOS 5 would only leave orbit once it decayed naturally. Without the parachutes or retrorockets, the capsule's descent would be far too fast for air recovery to be possible, but it could still easily survive reentry and land almost anywhere. The spent Agena-B stage reentered over Indonesia on 31 December, and it was calculated that reentry of the satellite itself would happen on 6 January 1962.

When 6 January 1962 came, the indications were that SAMOS 5 impacted somewhere in northwestern Canada. A US Air Force search party attempted to obtain Canadian permission to search the suspected area, but were unable to explain exactly what they were looking for. The Canadian authorities were suspicious that a B-52 aircraft had accidentally lost a nuclear warhead somewhere, and since this was not an easily resolved matter, the search was called off. Later on, a pair of U-2 reconnaissance aircraft searched the suspected area, but failed to locate any satellite debris.

=== SAMOS 6 ===
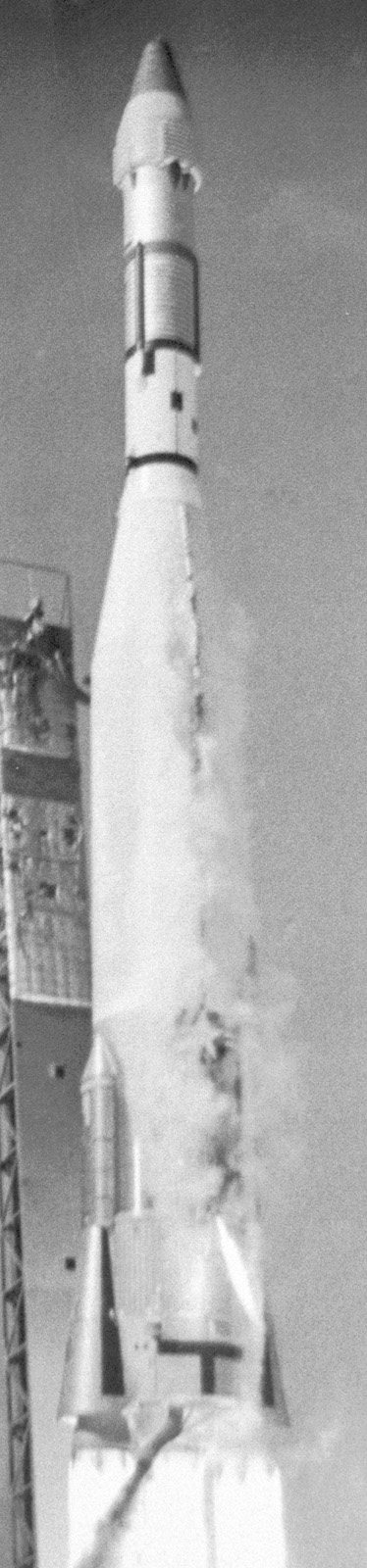
Atlas LV-3 Agena-B with SAMOS 6

SAMOS 6 was launched on 7 March 1962 at 19:12:00 GMT, finally had no booster problems, in part due to modifications made to the Agena-B after lessons learned from previous missions, but a series of erroneous ground commands caused the satellite to deplete its attitude control gas. When the Agena stage fired for the deorbit maneuver, SAMOS 6 was launched into a high orbit. In July 1963, fifteen months later, the satellite was on the verge of reentry. With the electrical system dead for months, there was again no chance of an air recovery of the capsule, but it could still survive reentry. However, it was calculated that impact would occur in the Arabian Sea and in all likelihood, the cold ocean water would crack the heat shield and cause it to sink. No attempt was made to recover SAMOS 6, which did apparently land in the Arabian Sea. At this point, the idea of the recoverable capsule was abandoned and the electro-optical system put back into use. It proved no more successful than before and after another five SAMOS launches, the program was terminated.

By the end of 1962, when the last SAMOS satellite flew, only the CORONA program had managed to return usable reconnaissance images. The photos obtained by SAMOS 2 back at the start of 1961 were considered little more than curiosities, their resolution too low for reconnaissance. The Lanyard program had by this time emerged as a successor to SAMOS, and by 1962, CORONA was at last reaching operational status.

In addition, aside program was operated during this period (Program 102) which launched a modified SAMOS on the Thor-Agena B with no cameras at all, but instead electronic monitoring equipment for detecting Soviet missile launches — what could be described as an early ELINT satellite. Four of these were launched from 1962 to 1963 with one failure when the first satellite's Agena-B failed to restart in orbit. The standard SAMOS apparently also carried ELINT subsatellites that remained attached to the Agena-B stage.

Like most early space programs, SAMOS had goals that exceeded what contemporary technology was capable of, and the launch vehicles used to orbit it were nearly as marginal as the satellite itself. Digital photography was not attempted successfully until the KH-11 satellites came online in the late 1970s.

== Vehicle missions ==
From October 1960 to November 1962, at least 11 launch attempts were made. Portions of the program are still considered classified information. It is believed that the program was cancelled because the imagery produced was poor. The program was operated by the United States Air Force, but was overshadowed by the CIA CORONA program.

SAMOS launches
Name	Launch date	Mass (kg)	Perigee (km)	Apogee (km)	Inclination	NSSDC ID	Comments
SAMOS 1	11 October 1960	1,845	--------	--------	--------	SAMOS1	A loss of nitrogen gas pressure had disrupted the guidance and control systems at 123 seconds, resulting in poor trajectory and failure to orbit the payload. Tracking telemetry were lost prior to the Agena-A ignition, so the exact trajectory was unknown.
SAMOS 2	31 January 1961	1,860	474	557	97.4°	1961-001A	First generation photo surveillance; radio relay of images; micrometeoroid impact data. Decayed 21 October 1971.
SAMOS 3	9 September 1961	1,890	--------	--------	--------	SAMOS3	Pad umbilical disconnect 0.21 seconds later than intended. The Atlas lost electrical power and fell back onto the pad, exploding.
SAMOS 4	22 November 1961	1,860	--------	--------	--------	NNN6101	Atlas attitude control failure at T+247 seconds leaving the booster oriented in the wrong direction. The Agena-B could not attain orbital velocity and fell into the Pacific Ocean.
SAMOS 5	22 December 1961	1,860	244	702	89.2°	1961-035A	Decayed 14 August 1962.
SAMOS 6	7 March 1962	1,860	251	676	90.9°	1962-007A	Decayed 7 June 1963.
SAMOS 7	26 April 1962	1,588	203	204	92.0°	1962-016A	Decayed 28 April 1962.
SAMOS 8	17 June 1962	1,860	--------	--------	--------	1962-023A	Decayed 18 June 1962.
SAMOS 9	18 July 1962	1,860	184	236	96.1°	1962-030A	Decayed 25 July 1962.
SAMOS 10	5 August 1962	1,860	205	205	96.3°	1962-035A	Decayed 6 August 1962.
SAMOS 11	11 November 1962	1,860	206	206	96,0°	1962-064A	Decayed 12 November 1962.

At least two different generations of the satellite were made, and at least four different types of cameras were used. Early on, the idea was to use frame readout cameras that would take a picture and send the scanned image via radio to ground stations on Earth. This system was apparently troublesome, so the program also developed a photographic film return system where the camera and used film would be ejected and be retrieved as it floated down through the atmosphere by parachute. Film-return satellites would remain the standard until the KH-11 satellite with digital imaging capability emerged in the 1970s.

== Equipment ==
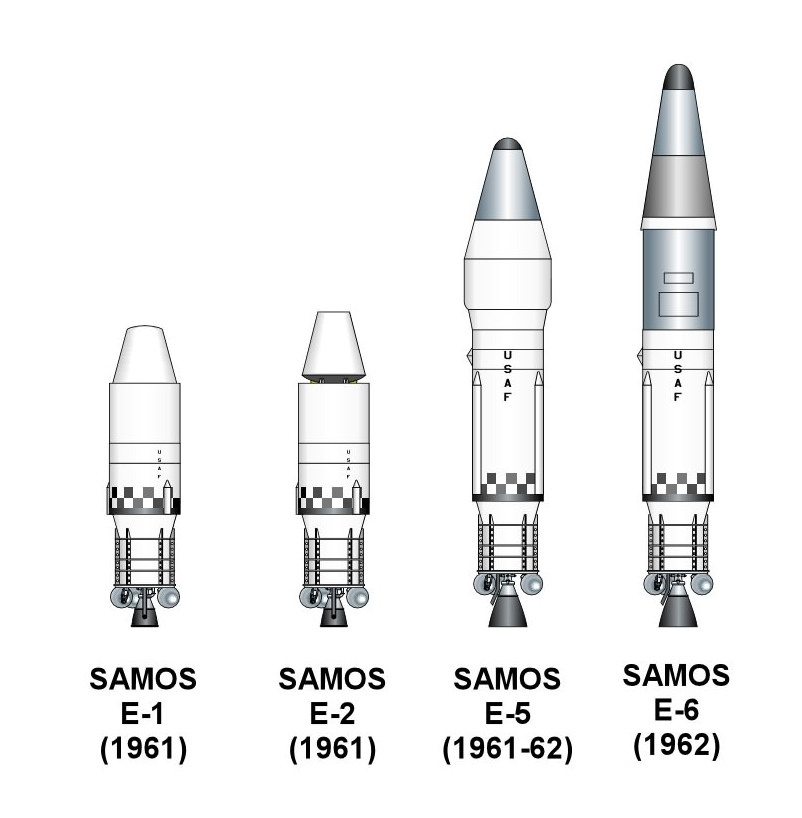
SAMOS cameras type and configuration

SAMOS satellites used four types of cameras. The E-1 and E-2 cameras used the readout method. Little is known about the E-3 type of camera, which was eventually cancelled. It likely had higher resolution, and may have been superseded by the later E-6. An E-4 camera was initially planned for relatively low-resolution mapmaking purposes, but it was cancelled with the functionality being taken up by the KH-5 (Argon) satellite. The E-5 and E-6 were panoramic format film cameras that appeared in later launches, but only a few were used. The E-5 would later be called upon in the short-lived KH-6 (Lanyard) program.

E-1 camera, particularly the unique system of developing and scanning the film on orbit, was later adopted by Kodak for NASA moon cartographic Lunar Orbiter program.

SAMOS cameras
Name	Type	Focal Length	Resolution	Swath
E-1	readout	1.83 m (72 in)	30 m (100 ft)	161 × 161 km
E-2	readout	0.91 m (36 in)	6 m (20 ft)	27 × 27 km
E-5	film	1.67 m (66 in)	1.5 m (5 ft)	98 km length
E-6	film	0.7 m (28 in)	2.4 m (8 ft)	280 km width

Some satellites were equipped with so-called Ferret devices, for "ferreting" information by spying on electronic communication. A more modern term for that activity would be Signals Intelligence. Toward the end of the program, satellites were only being launched with Ferrets, without any cameras. Two Ferret systems were created, designated F-1 and F-2.

Some additional payloads were sometimes on board, mostly scientific devices for learning more about the space environment so that future satellites could be better-designed for spaceflight. The satellites as launched varied in mass from 1,845 to 1,890 kilograms.

== Orbit ==
SAMOS 2 was the first satellite to enter a Sun-synchronous orbit.

== Recovery by Soviets ==
Section data from Wade

Sergei Khrushchev wrote in his memoirs about the partial recovery of what he believed was a SAMOS satellite, except the date, was the winter before the program started. A second capsule was apparently recovered in early 1961, although the device had been disassembled by local farmers, exposing film and preventing the Soviets from determining the satellite's capabilities. It may or may not have been a SAMOS.

== See also ==
- James Gilbert Baker
