= List of Thor and Delta launches (1960–1969) =

Between 1960 and 1969, there were 314 Thor missiles launched, of which 272 were successful, giving an 86.6% success rate.

== Launch statistics ==
=== Rocket configurations ===
- Thor DM
- Thor SVL
- Thor DSV
- Thor Burner
- Thor-Ablestar
- Delta A
- Delta B
- Delta C
- Delta D
- Delta E
- Delta G
- Delta J
- Delta L
- Delta M
- Delta N

=== Launch sites ===
- Cape Canaveral LC-17A
- Cape Canaveral LC-17B
- Cape Canaveral LC-18B
- Vandenberg LC-75
- Vandenberg LE-7
- Vandenberg LE-8
- Arguello LC-1-1 (Vandenberg SLC-3)
- Vandenberg PALC-1-1
- Vandenberg SLC-1W
- Vandenberg SLC-1E
- Vandenberg SLC-2W
- Vandenberg SLC-2E
- Vandenberg SLC-3W
- Vandenberg SLC-10W
- Tanegashima SLC-N
- Johnston LE-1
- Johnston LE-2

=== Launch outcomes ===
- Success
- Partial Failure
- Failure

== 1960 ==
There were 29 Thor missiles launched in 1960. 22 of the 29 launches were successful, giving a 75.8% success rate.

Date/Time (UTC)	Rocket	S/N	Launch site	Payload	Function	Orbit	Outcome	Remarks
1960-01-14; 16:35	Thor DM-18C	Thor 256	CCAFS LC-18B		Missile test	Suborbital	Success	Maiden flight of Thor DM-18C
1960-01-21; 20:10	Thor DM-18A	Thor 215	VAFB LC-75-1-2		Missile test	Suborbital	Success	
1960-02-04; 18:51:45	Thor DM-18 Agena-A	Thor 218; Agena 1052	VAFB LC-75-3-4	Discoverer 9	Reconnaissance	LEO	Failure	Premature Thor cutoff. Agena could not attain orbital velocity.
1960-02-09; 17:11	Thor DM-18C	Thor 259	CCAFS LC-18B		Missile test	Suborbital	Success	
1960-02-19; 20:15:14	Thor DM-18 Agena-A	Thor 223; Agena 1054	VAFB LC-75-3-5	Discoverer 10	Reconnaissance	LEO	Failure	Thor flight control malfunction. RSO T+52 seconds.
1960-02-29	Thor DM-18C	Thor 263	CCAFS LC-18B		Missile test	Suborbital	Success	
1960-03-02; 20:06	Thor DM-18A	Thor 272	VAFB LC-75-2-8		Missile test	Suborbital	Success	
1960-03-11; 13:00	Thor DM-18 Able-IV	Thor 219	CCAFS LC-17A	Pioneer 5	Scientific	Heliocentric	Success	Only flight of Thor-Able IV
1960-04-01; 11:40:09	Thor DM-18 Able-II	Thor 148	CCAFS LC-17A	TIROS-1	Weather	LEO	Success	Final flight of Thor-Able
1960-04-13; 12:02:36	Thor DM-21 Ablestar	Thor 257; Ablestar 002	CCAFS LC-17B	Transit 1B	Navigation	LEO	Success	Maiden flight of Thor-Ablestar
1960-04-15; 20:30:37	Thor DM-18 Agena-A	Thor 234; Agena 1055	VAFB LC-75-3-5	Discoverer 11	Reconnaissance	LEO	Success	
1960-05-13; 09:16:05	Thor DM-19 Delta	Thor 144; Delta 1	CCAFS LC-17A	Echo 1	Communication	MEO	Failure	Maiden flight of Thor-Delta, upper-stage attitude control system malfunctioned
1960-06-22; 05:54	Thor DM-21 Ablestar	Thor 281; Ablestar 003	CCAFS LC-17B	Transit 2A; GRAB-1 (Solrad 1)	Navigation; ELINT	LEO	Success	
1960-06-22; 23:26	Thor DM-18A	Thor 233	VAFB LC-75-2-7		Missile test	Suborbital	Success	
1960-06-29; 22:00:44	Thor DM-18 Agena-A	Thor 160; Agena 1053	VAFB LC-75-3-4	Discoverer 12	Reconnaissance	LEO	Failure	Agena attitude control malfunction.
1960-08-10; 20:37:54	Thor DM-18 Agena-A	Thor 231; Agena 1057	VAFB LC-75-3-5	Discoverer 13	Reconnaissance	LEO	Success	First successful recovery of a manmade object from orbit.
1960-08-12; 09:39:43	Thor DM-19 Delta	Thor 270; Delta 2	CCAFS LC-17A	Echo 1A	Communications	MEO	Success	
1960-08-18; 19:57:08	Thor DM-18 Agena-A	Thor 237; Agena 1056	VAFB LC-75-3-4	Discoverer 14	Reconnaissance	LEO	Success	
1960-08-18; 19:58	Thor DM-21 Ablestar	Thor 262; Ablestar 004	CCAFS LC-17B	Courier 1A	Communications	LEO	Failure	Premature first stage cutoff. RSO T+150 seconds.
1960-09-13; 22:14	Thor DM-18 Agena-A	Thor 246; Agena 1058	VAFB LC-75-3-5	Discoverer 15	Reconnaissance	LEO	Success	
1960-10-04; 17:50	Thor DM-21 Ablestar	Thor 293; Ablestar 005	CCAFS LC-17B	Courier 1B	Communications	LEO	Success	
1960-10-11; 21:53	Thor DM-18A	Thor 186	VAFB LC-75-2-8		Missile test	Suborbital	Success	
1960-10-26; 20:26	Thor DM-21 Agena-B	Thor 253; Agena 1061	VAFB LC-75-3-4	Discoverer 16	Reconnaissance	LEO	Failure	Maiden flight of Thor-Agena B. Agena staging failed. Vehicle fell into the Pacific Ocean.
1960-11-12; 20:43	Thor DM-21 Agena-B	Thor 297; Agena 1062	VAFB LC-75-3-5	Discoverer 17	Reconnaissance	LEO	Success	
1960-11-23; 11:13:03	Thor DM-19 Delta	Thor 245; Delta 3	CCAFS LC-17A	TIROS-2	Weather	LEO	Success	
1960-11-30; 19:50	Thor DM-21 Ablestar	Thor 283; Ablestar 006	CCAFS LC-17B	Transit 3A; GRAB-2 (Solrad-2)	Navigation; ELINT	LEO	Failure	Premature Thor cutoff. RSO. Debris fell in Cuba.
1960-12-07; 20:20:58	Thor DM-21 Agena-B	Thor 296; Agena 1103	VAFB LC-75-3-4	Discoverer 18	Reconnaissance	LEO	Success	
1960-12-13; 20:08	Thor DM-18A	Thor 267	VAFB LC-75-2-8		Missile test	Suborbital	Success	
1960-12-20; 20:32	Thor DM-21 Agena-B	Thor 258; Agena 1101	VAFB LC-75-3-5	Discoverer 19	Technology	LEO	Success	

== 1961 ==
There were 27 Thor missiles launched in 1961. 21 of the 27 launches were successful, giving a 77.7% success rate.

Date/Time (UTC)	Rocket	S/N	Launch site	Payload	Function	Orbit	Outcome	Remarks
1961-02-17; 20:25	Thor DM-21 Agena-B	Thor 298	VAFB LC-75-3-4	Discoverer 20	Reconnaissance	LEO	Success	
1961-02-18; 22:58	Thor DM-21 Agena-B	Thor 261; Agena 1102	VAFB LC-75-3-5	Discoverer 21	Technology	LEO	Success	
1961-02-22; 03:45	Thor DM-21 Ablestar	Thor 313; Ablestar 007	CCAFS LC-17B	Transit 3B; Lofti 1	Navigation; Technology	LEO	Success	
1961-03-25; 15:17:04	Thor DM-19 Delta	Thor 295; Delta 4	CCAFS LC-17A	Explorer 10	Magnetospheric	HEO	Success	
1961-03-30; 05:13:43	Thor DM-18A	Thor 243	VAFB LC-75-2-7		Missile test	Suborbital	Success	
1961-03-30; 20:34:43	Thor DM-21 Agena-B	Thor 300; Agena 1105	VAFB LC-75-3-4	Discoverer 22	Reconnaissance	LEO	Failure	Agena control failure.
1961-04-08; 19:21	Thor DM-21 Agena-B	Thor 307; Agena 1106	VAFB LC-75-3-5	Discoverer 23	Reconnaissance	LEO	Success	
1961-06-08; 21:16	Thor DM-21 Agena-B	Thor 302; Agena 1108	VAFB LC-75-3-4	Discoverer 24	Reconnaissance	LEO	Failure	Agena power failure
1961-06-16; 23:02	Thor DM-21 Agena-B	Thor 303; Agena 1107	VAFB LC-75-1-1	Discoverer 25	Reconnaissance	LEO	Success	
1961-06-20; 23:54	Thor DM-18A	Thor 276	VAFB LC-75-2-7		Missile test	Suborbital	Success	
1961-06-29; 04:22	Thor DM-21 Ablestar	Thor 315; Ablestar 008	CCAFS LC-17B	Transit 4A; Injun 1 GRAB-3 (Solrad 3)	Navigation; Ionospheric; ELINT	LEO	Success	
1961-07-07; 23:29:48	Thor DM-21 Agena-B	Thor 308; Agena 1109	VAFB LC-75-3-5	Discoverer 26	Reconnaissance	LEO	Success	
1961-07-12; 10:25:06	Thor DM-19 Delta	Thor 286; Delta 5	CCAFS LC-17A	TIROS-3	Weather	LEO	Success	
1961-07-21; 22:35	Thor DM-21 Agena-B	Thor 322; Agena 1110	VAFB LC-75-3-4	Discoverer 27	Reconnaissance	LEO	Failure	Open circuit in guidance computer led to loss of control and vehicle breakup at T+60 seconds.
1961-08-04; 00:01	Thor DM-21 Agena-B	Thor 309; Agena 1111	VAFB LC-75-1-1	Discoverer 28	Reconnaissance	LEO	Failure	Agena control system malfunctioned
1961-08-16; 03:21:05	Thor DM-19 Delta	Thor 312; Delta 6	CCAFS LC-17A	Explorer 12	Magnetospheric	HEO	Success	
1961-08-30; 20:00	Thor DM-21 Agena-B	Thor 323; Agena 1112	VAFB LC-75-3-4	Discoverer 29	Reconnaissance	LEO	Success	
1961-09-06; 22:30	Thor DM-18A	Thor 165	VAFB LE-7		Missile test	Suborbital	Success	
1961-09-12; 19:59	Thor DM-21 Agena-B	Thor 310; Agena 1113	VAFB LC-75-3-5	Discoverer 30	Reconnaissance	LEO	Success	
1961-09-17; 21:00	Thor DM-21 Agena-B	Thor 324; Agena 1114	VAFB LC-75-1-1	Discoverer 31	Reconnaissance	LEO	Success	
1961-10-13; 19:22	Thor DM-21 Agena-B	Thor 328; Agena 1115	VAFB LC-75-3-4	Discoverer 32	Reconnaissance	LEO	Success	100th Thor launch
1961-10-23; 19:23	Thor DM-21 Agena-B	Thor 329; Agena 1116	VAFB LC-75-3-5	Discoverer 33	Reconnaissance	LEO	Failure	Agena hydraulics failure
1961-11-05; 20:00	Thor DM-21 Agena-B	Thor 330; Agena 1117	VAFB LC-75-1-1	Discoverer 34	Reconnaissance	LEO	Failure	Incorrect guidance program left the satellite in a useless orbit.
1961-11-15; 21:23	Thor DM-21 Agena-B	Thor 326; Agena 1118	VAFB LC-75-3-4	Discoverer 35	Reconnaissance	LEO	Success	
1961-11-15; 22:26	Thor DM-21 Ablestar	Thor 305; Ablestar 009	CCAFS LC-17B	Transit 4B; TRAAC	Navigation	LEO	Success	Transit Research and Attitude Control
1961-12-06; 01:30	Thor DM-18A	Thor 214	VAFB LE-8		Missile test	Suborbital	Success	
1961-12-12; 20:40	Thor DM-21 Agena-B	Thor 325; Agena 1119	VAFB LC-75-3-4	Discoverer 36; Oscar 1	Reconnaissance; Amateur radio satellite	LEO	Success	

== 1962 ==
There were 50 Thor missiles launched in 1962. 42 of the 50 launches were successful, giving an 84% success rate.

Date/Time (UTC)	Rocket	S/N	Launch site	Payload	Function	Orbit	Outcome	Remarks
1962-01-13; 21:41	Thor DM-21 Agena-B	Thor 327; Agena 1120	VAFB LC-75-3-4	Discoverer 37	Reconnaissance	LEO	Failure	Agena restart burn failed.
1962-01-15; 11:07:01	Thor DSV-2D	Thor 337	CCAFS LC-17A		ASAT test	Suborbital	Success	
1962-01-24; 09:30	Thor DM-21 Ablestar	Thor 311; Ablestar 010	CCAFS LC-17B	LOFTI-2A; SECOR; GRAB-4 (Solrad 4); Injun 2 SURCAL 1	Technology; Geodesy; ELINT; Ionospheric; Calibration	LEO	Failure	Second stage insufficient thrust
1962-02-08; 12:43:45	Thor DM-19 Delta	Thor 317; Delta 7	CCAFS LC-17A	TIROS-4	Weather	LEO	Success	
1962-02-21; 18:44	Thor DM-21 Agena-B	Thor 332; Agena 2301	VAFB LC-75-3-5	FTV 2301	ELINT	LEO	Partial failure	Upper stage failed to restart for circularization burn
1962-02-27; 19:39	Thor DM-21 Agena-B	Thor 241; Agena 1123	VAFB LC-75-3-4	Discoverer 38	Reconnaissance	LEO	Success	
1962-03-07; 16:06:18	Thor DM-19 Delta	Thor 301; Delta 8	CCAFS LC-17A	OSO 1	Solar	LEO	Success	
1962-03-19; 23:28	Thor DM-18A	Thor 229	VAFB LE-7		Missile test	Suborbital	Success	
1962-04-18; 00:54	Thor DM-21 Agena-B	Thor 331; Agena 1124	VAFB LC-75-3-5	Discoverer 39	Reconnaissance	LEO	Success	
1962-04-26; 18:00:16	Thor DM-19 Delta	Thor 320; Delta 9	CCAFS LC-17A	Ariel 1	Ionospheric	LEO	Success	
1962-04-29; 00:30:12	Thor DM-21 Agena-B	Thor 333; Agena 1125	VAFB LC-75-3-4	FTV 1125	Reconnaissance	LEO	Success	
1962-05-02; 23:44:53	Thor DSV-2E	Thor 177	Johnston LE-1	TIGERFISH	Nuclear test	Suborbital	Success	
1962-05-10; 12:06	Thor DM-21 Ablestar	Thor 314; Ablestar 011	CCAFS LC-17B	ANNA 1A	Geodesy	LEO	Failure	Second stage failed to ignite
1962-05-15; 19:36	Thor DM-21 Agena-B	Thor 334; Agena 1126	VAFB LC-75-3-5	FTV 1126	Reconnaissance	LEO	Success	
1962-05-30; 01:00:04	Thor DM-21 Agena-B	Thor 336; Agena 1128	VAFB LC-75-1-1	FTV 1128	Reconnaissance	LEO	Success	
1962-06-02; 00:31	Thor DM-21 Agena-B	Thor 335; Agena 1127	VAFB LC-75-3-4	FTV 1127; Oscar 2	Reconnaissance; Amateur radio	LEO	Success	
1962-06-04; 09:44:17	Thor DSV-2E	Thor 199	Johnston LE-1	Bluegill	Nuclear test	Suborbital	Failure	Radar contact lost 5 minutes after launch. RSO destruct command sent.
1962-06-18; 20:20	Thor DM-21 Agena-B	Thor 343; Agena 2312	VAFB LC-75-3-5	FTV 2312	ELINT	LEO	Success	
1962-06-19; 00:30	Thor DM-18A	Thor 269	VAFB LE-8		Missile test	Suborbital	Success	
1962-06-19; 12:19:01	Thor DM-19 Delta	Thor 321; Delta 10	CCAFS LC-17A	TIROS-5	Weather	LEO	Success	
1962-06-20; 08:46:16	Thor DSV-2E	Thor 193	Johnston LE-1	STARFISH	Nuclear test	Suborbital	Failure	RVs caused turbine exhaust gas to enter the thrust section, overheating and weakening the engine mounts. Engine broke loose and ruptured the propellant tanks T+59 seconds. Warhead destroyed by RSO T+65 seconds.
1962-06-23; 00:30	Thor DM-21 Agena-B	Thor 339; Agena 1129	VAFB LC-75-3-4	FTV 1129	Reconnaissance	LEO	Success	
1962-06-28; 01:09	Thor DM-21 Agena-D	Thor 340; Agena 1151	VAFB LC-75-1-1	FTV 1151	Reconnaissance	LEO	Success	
1962-07-09; 08:46:28	Thor DSV-2E	Thor 195	Johnston LE-1	STARFISH PRIME	Nuclear test	Suborbital	Success	
1962-07-10; 08:35:05	Thor DM-19 Delta	Thor 316; Delta 11	CCAFS LC-17B	Telstar 1	Communication	MEO	Success	
1962-07-18; 09:30:12	Thor DSV-2D	Thor 338	CCAFS LC-17A		ASAT test	Suborbital	Success	
1962-07-21; 00:56	Thor DM-21 Agena-B	Thor 342; Agena 1130	VAFB LC-75-3-5	FTV 1130	Reconnaissance	LEO	Success	
1962-07-26; 09:13:53	Thor DSV-2E	Thor 180	Johnston LE-1	Bluegill Prime	Nuclear test	Suborbital	Failure	Stuck LOX valve caused loss of thrust and fire on the launch stand. Range Safety Officer destroyed the missile and warhead. Launch area extensively contaminated with plutonium.
1962-07-28; 00:30	Thor DM-21 Agena-B	Thor 347; Agena 1131	VAFB LC-75-3-4	FTV 1131	Reconnaissance	LEO	Success	
1962-08-02; 00:17	Thor DM-21 Agena-D	Thor 344; Agena 1152	VAFB LC-75-1-1	FTV 1152	Reconnaissance	LEO	Success	
1962-08-29; 01:00	Thor DM-21 Agena-D	Thor 349; Agena 1153	VAFB LC-75-1-2	FTV 1153	Reconnaissance	LEO	Success	
1962-09-01; 20:39	Thor DM-21 Agena-B	Thor 348; Agena 1132	VAFB LC-75-3-5	FTV 1132	Reconnaissance	LEO	Success	
1962-09-17; 23:46	Thor DM-21 Agena-B	Thor 350; Agena 1133	VAFB LC-75-3-4	FTV 1133; ERS-2	Reconnaissance; Technology	LEO	Success	
1962-09-18; 08:53:08	Thor DM-19 Delta	Thor 318; Delta 12	CCAFS LC-17A	TIROS-6	Weather	LEO	Success	Final flight of Thor-Delta
1962-09-29; 06:05	Thor DM-21 Agena-B	Thor 341; TA-1	VAFB LC-75-1-1	Alouette 1 TAVE	Ionospheric; Technology	LEO	Success	
1962-09-29; 23:34:50	Thor DM-21 Agena-D	Thor 351; Agena 1154	VAFB LC-75-1-2	FTV 1154	Reconnaissance	LEO	Success	
1962-10-02; 22:11:30	Delta A	Thor 345; Delta 13	CCAFS LC-17B	Explorer 14	Magnetospheric	HEO	Success	Maiden flight of Delta A
1962-10-09; 18:35	Thor DM-21 Agena-B	Thor 352; Agena 1134	VAFB LC-75-3-4	FTV 1134	Reconnaissance	LEO	Success	
1962-10-16; 09:14:38	Thor DSV-2E	Thor 156	Johnston LE-2	Bluegill Double Prime	Nuclear test	Suborbital	Failure	Flight control failure T+85 seconds. RSO T+156 seconds.
1962-10-26; 09:44:05	Thor DSV-2E	Thor 141	Johnston LE-1	Bluegill Triple Prime	Nuclear test	Suborbital	Success	
1962-10-26; 16:14	Thor DM-21 Agena-D	Thor 353; Agena 1401	VAFB LC-75-1-2	STARAD	Radiation	MEO	Success	
1962-10-27; 23:15:01	Delta A	Thor 346; Delta 14	CCAFS LC-17B	Explorer 15	Radiation	MEO	Success	Final flight of Delta A
1962-10-31; 08:08	Thor DM-21 Ablestar	Thor 319; Ablestar 012	CCAFS LC-17A	ANNA 1B	Geodesy	LEO	Success	Final flight of Thor DM-21 Ablestar
1962-11-01; 11:54:48	Thor DSV-2E	Thor 226	Johnston LE-2	KINGFISH	Nuclear test	Suborbital	Success	
1962-11-05; 22:04	Thor DM-21 Agena-B	Thor 356; Agena 1136	VAFB LC-75-3-4	FTV 1136	Reconnaissance	LEO	Success	
1962-11-24; 22:01	Thor DM-21 Agena-B	Thor 367; Agena 1135	VAFB LC-75-3-4	FTV 1135	Reconnaissance	LEO	Success	
1962-12-04; 21:30	Thor DM-21 Agena-D	Thor 361; Agena 1155	VAFB LC-75-1-2	FTV 1155	Reconnaissance	LEO	Success	
1962-12-13; 04:07	Thor DM-21 Agena-D	Thor 365	VAFB LC-75-1-1	NRL PL120; Injun 3 NRL PL121; SURCAL 2 Calsphere 1	ELINT; Ionospheric; Calibration	MEO	Success	
1962-12-13; 23:30:01	Delta B	Thor 355; Delta 15	CCAFS LC-17A	Relay 1	Communications	MEO	Success	Maiden flight of Delta B
1962-12-14; 21:26:07	Thor DM-21 Agena-D	Thor 368; Agena 1156	VAFB LC-75-3-5	FTV 1156	Reconnaissance	LEO	Success	

== 1963 ==
There were 30 Thor missiles launched in 1963. 26 of the 30 launches were successful, giving an 86.6% success rate.

Date/Time (UTC)	Rocket	S/N	Launch site	Payload	Function	Orbit	Outcome	Remarks
1963-01-07; 21:09:49	Thor DM-21 Agena-D	Thor 369; Agena 1157	VAFB LC-75-1-1	OPS 0048	Reconnaissance	LEO	Success	
1963-01-16; 21:59	Thor DM-21 Agena-B	Thor 363; Agena 2313	VAFB LC-75-3-5	OPS 0180	ELINT	LEO	Success	
1963-02-14; 05:35:08	Delta B	Thor 358; Delta 16	CCAFS LC-17B	Syncom 1	Communications	GTO	Success	Electronics failure on payload
1963-02-28; 21:48	TAT SLV-2A Agena-D	Thor 354; Agena 1159	VAFB LC-75-3-5	OPS 0583	Reconnaissance	LEO	Failure	Maiden flight of Thrust-Augmented Thor Agena. One SRB failed to ignite and subsequently separate from the vehicle, resulting in loss of control and self-destruct T+127 seconds. The resultant debris cloud drifted west to Arizona where it was photographed and featured in Life Magazine.
1963-03-18; 21:13	TAT SLV-2A Agena-D	Thor 360; Agena 1164	VAFB LC-75-3-4	OPS 0627	Reconnaissance	LEO	Failure	Electrical short at staging causes loss of Agena control and no orbit.
1963-04-01; 23:01	Thor DM-21 Agena-D	Thor 376; Agena 1160	VAFB LC-75-3-5	OPS 0720	Reconnaissance	LEO	Success	
1963-04-03; 02:00:02	Delta B	Thor 357; Delta 17	CCAFS LC-17A	Explorer 17	Atmospheric	LEO	Success	
1963-04-26; 20:13	Thor DM-21 Agena-D	Thor 372; Agena 1411	VAFB LC-75-1-1	OPS 1008	Reconnaissance	LEO	Failure	Attitude sensor alignment error results in no Agena orbit.
1963-05-07; 11:38:03	Delta B	Thor 366; Delta 18	CCAFS LC-17B	Telstar 2	Communications	MEO	Success	
1963-05-18; 22:21	TAT SLV-2A Agena-D	Thor 364; Agena 1165	VAFB LC-75-3-5	OPS 0924	Reconnaissance	LEO	Success	
1963-06-12; 23:58	TAT SLV-2A Agena-D	Thor 362; Agena 1161	VAFB LC-75-3-4	OPS 0954	Reconnaissance	LEO	Success	
1963-06-15; 14:29	Thor DM-21 Agena-D	Thor 378; Agena 2353	VAFB LC-75-1-1	FTV 1292; Solrad 6A; LOFTI 2B; Surcal 3 Radose 112	ELINT; Radiation; Ionospheric; Calibration	LEO	Success	
1963-06-19; 09:50:01	Delta B	Thor 359; Delta 19	CCAFS LC-17B	TIROS-7	Weather	LEO	Success	
1963-06-27; 00:37	TAT SLV-2A Agena-D	Thor 381; Agena 1166	VAFB LC-75-1-2	OPS 0999; Hitchhiker 1	Reconnaissance; ELINT	LEO	Success	
1963-06-29; 22:30	TAT SLV-2A Agena-B	Thor 380; Agena 2314	VAFB LC-75-3-5	OPS 1440	ELINT	LEO	Success	
1963-07-19; 00:00:10	Thor DM-21 Agena-D	Thor 388; Agena 1412	VAFB LC-75-1-1	OPS 1266	Reconnaissance	LEO	Success	
1963-07-26; 14:33:00	Delta B	Thor 370; Delta 20	CCAFS LC-17A	Syncom 2	Communications	GTO	Success	
1963-07-31; 00:00:17	TAT SLV-2A Agena-D	Thor 382; Agena 1167	VAFB LC-75-1-2	OPS 1370	Reconnaissance	LEO	Success	
1963-08-25; 00:30	TAT SLV-2A Agena-D	Thor 377; Agena 1162	VAFB LC-75-3-4	OPS 1419	Reconnaissance	LEO	Success	
1963-08-29; 20:31	Thor SLV-2 Agena-D	Thor 394; Agena 1169	VAFB LC-75-3-5	OPS 1561; LAMPO	Reconnaissance; Target	LEO	Success	
1963-09-18; 09:39	Thor DSV-2F	Thor 232	CCAFS LC-17B	ASSET-1	REV test	Suborbital	Success	Atmospheric flight
1963-09-23; 23:00	TAT SLV-2A Agena-D	Thor 383; Agena 1163	VAFB LC-75-1-2	OPS 1353	Reconnaissance	LEO	Success	
1963-09-28; 20:22	Thor DSV-2A Ablestar	Thor 375; Ablestar 013	VAFB LC-75-1-1	Transit 5BN-1; Transit 5E-1	Navigation	LEO	Success	
1963-10-29; 21:19	TAT SLV-2A Agena-D	Thor 386; Agena 1601	VAFB LC-75-3-4	OPS 2437; Hitchhiker 2	Reconnaissance; ELINT	LEO	Success	
1963-11-09; 20:27:54	Thor SLV-2 Agena-D	Thor 400; Agena 1171	VAFB LC-75-1-2	OPS 2268	Reconnaissance	LEO	Failure	Loss of heat shield causes high thrust section temperatures. Control loss at T+113 seconds followed by propulsion system shutdown.
1963-11-27; 02:30:01	Delta C	Thor 387; Delta 21	CCAFS LC-17B	Explorer 18	Magnetospheric	HEO	Success	Maiden flight of Delta C
1963-11-27; 21:15:40	Thor SLV-2 Agena-D	Thor 406; Agena 1172	Arguello LC-1-1	OPS 2260	Reconnaissance	LEO	Success	First Thor launch from Point Arguello
1963-12-05; 21:51	Thor DSV-2A Ablestar	Thor 385; Ablestar 015	VAFB LC-75-1-1	Transit 5BN-2; Transit 5E-3	Navigation	LEO	Success	
1963-12-21; 09:30:00	Delta B	Thor 371; Delta 22	CCAFS LC-17B	TIROS-8	Weather	LEO	Success	
1963-12-21; 21:45	TAT SLV-2A Agena-D	Thor 398; Agena 1168	VAFB LC-75-1-2	OPS 1388; Hitchhiker 3	Reconnaissance; ELINT	LEO	Success	

== 1964 ==
There were 41 Thor missiles launched in 1964. 34 of the 41 launches were successful, giving an 82.9% success rate.

Date/Time (GMT)	Rocket	S/N	Launch site	Payload	Function	Orbit	Outcome	Remarks
1964-01-11; 20:07	TAT SLV-2A Agena-D	Thor 390; Agena 2354	VAFB LC-75-3-5	NRL PL135 (Poppy 3); GGSE-1; Solrad 7A; SECOR-1	ELINT; Technology; Raditation; Geodesy	LEO	Success	
1964-01-19; 10:59:54	Thor SLV-2 Agena-D	Thor 384; Agena 2302	VAFB LC-75-1-2	OPS 3367A; OPS 3367B	Weather	LEO	Success	
1964-01-21; 21:14:59	Delta B	Thor 373; Delta 23	CCAFS LC-17B	Relay 2	Communications	MEO	Success	
1964-01-25; 13:59:04	Thor SLV-2 Agena-B	Thor 397; Agena 6301; TA-2	VAFB LC-75-1-1	Echo 2	Communications	LEO	Success	
1964-02-14; 07:47	Thor DSV-2J	Thor 299	Johnston LE-1		ASAT test	Suborbital	Success	
1964-02-15; 21:38	TAT SLV-2A Agena-D	Thor 389; Agena 1174	VAFB LC-75-3-4	OPS 3444	Reconnaissance	LEO	Success	
1964-02-28; 03:20	TAT SLV-2A Agena-D	Thor 402; Agena 2316	VAFB LC-75-3-5	OPS 3722	ELINT	LEO	Success	
1964-03-01; 06:40	Thor DSV-2J	Thor 209	Johnston LE-1		ASAT test	Suborbital	Success	
1964-03-19; 11:13:41	Delta B	Thor 391; Delta 24	CCAFS LC-17A	BE-A	Ionospheric	LEO	Failure	Third stage underperformed
1964-03-24; 12:15	Thor DSV-2G	Thor 240	CCAFS LC-17B	ASSET-2	REV test	Suborbital	Failure	Atmospheric flight, second stage fired intermittently, destroyed by range safety
1964-03-24; 22:22:48	TAT SLV-2A Agena-D	Thor 396; Agena 1175	Arguello LC-1-1	OPS 3467	Reconnaissance	LEO	Failure	Agena power failure. No orbit.
1964-04-21; 06:15	Thor DSV-2J	Thor 290	Johnston LE-2		ASAT test	Suborbital	Success	
1964-04-21; 18:50	Thor DSV-2A Ablestar	Thor 379; Ablestar 014	VAFB LC-75-1-1	Transit 5BN-3; Transit 5E-4	Navigation	LEO	Failure	
1964-04-27; 23:23:43	TAT SLV-2A Agena-D	Thor 395; Agena 1604	VAFB LC-75-3-4	OPS 2921	Reconnaissance	LEO	Success	Agena failed to restart in orbit due to power failure.
1964-05-28; 07:32	Thor DSV-2J	Thor 227	Johnston LE-2		ASAT test	Suborbital	Failure	
1964-06-04; 22:59	TAT SLV-2A Agena-D	Thor 403; Agena 1176	Arguello LC-1-1	OPS 3483	Reconnaissance	LEO	Success	
1964-06-13; 15:47	TAT SLV-2A Agena-D	Thor 408; Agena 1606	VAFB LC-75-1-2	OPS 3236	Reconnaissance	LEO	Success	
1964-06-18; 04:56:08	Thor SLV-2 Agena-D	Thor 407; Agena 2304	VAFB LC-75-3-4	OPS 4467A; OPS 4467B	Weather	LEO	Success	
1964-06-19; 23:18	TAT SLV-2A Agena-D	Thor 410; Agena 1609	VAFB LC-75-1-1	OPS 3754	Reconnaissance	LEO	Success	
1964-07-02; 23:59:56	TAT SLV-2A Agena-D	Thor 409; Agena 2315	VAFB LC-75-3-5	OPS 3395	ELINT	LEO	Success	
1964-07-10; 23:15	TAT SLV-2A Agena-D	Thor 404; Agena 1177	Arguello LC-1-1	OPS 3491	Reconnaissance	LEO	Success	
1964-07-22; 15:39	Thor DSV-2G	Thor 250	CCAFS LC-17B	ASSET-3	REV test	Suborbital	Success	Atmospheric flight
1964-08-05; 23:15:35	TAT SLV-2A Agena-D	Thor 413; Agena 1605	VAFB LC-75-3-4	OPS 3042	Reconnaissance	LEO	Success	
1964-08-19; 12:15:02	Delta D	Thor 417; Delta 25	CCAFS LC-17A	Syncom 3	Communications	GTO	Success	
1964-08-21; 15:45	TAT SLV-2A Agena-D	Thor 412; Agena 1603	VAFB LC-75-1-2	OPS 2739	Reconnaissance	LEO	Success	
1964-08-28; 07:56:57	Thor SLV-2 Agena-B	Thor 399; Agena 6201; TA-3	VAFB LC-75-1-1	Nimbus 1	Weather	LEO	Partial failure	Second-stage cutoff early during second burn
1964-09-14; 22:53	TAT SLV-2A Agena-D	Thor 405; Agena 1178	VAFB PALC-1-1	OPS 3497	Reconnaissance	LEO	Success	
1964-10-04; 03:45:00	Delta C	Thor 392; Delta 26	CCAFS LC-17A	Explorer 21	Magnetospheric	HEO	Partial failure	Reached lower than planned orbit
1964-10-05; 21:50:14	TAT SLV-2A Agena-D	Thor 421; Agena 1170	VAFB LC-75-3-4	OPS 3333	Reconnaissance	LEO	Success	
1964-10-06; 17:04:21	Thor DSV-2A Ablestar	Thor 423; Ablestar 016	VAFB LC-75-1-2	OPS 5796 (Transit O-1); Dragsphere 1 Dragsphere 2	Navigation	LEO	Success	
1964-10-17; 22:02:23	TAT SLV-2A Agena-D	Thor 418; Agena 1179	VAFB PALC-1-1	OPS 3559	Reconnaissance	LEO	Success	
1964-10-29; 03:35	Thor DSV-2F	Thor 260	CCAFS LC-17B	ASSET-4	REV test	Suborbital	Success	Atmospheric flight
1964-11-02; 21:30:20	TAT SLV-2A Agena-D	Thor 420; Agena 1173	VAFB LC-75-3-4	OPS 5434	Reconnaissance	LEO	Success	
1964-11-04; 02:12:11	TAT SLV-2A Agena-D	Thor 430; Agena 2317	VAFB LC-75-3-5	OPS 3062	ELINT	LEO	Success	
1964-11-16; 06:57	Thor DSV-2J	Thor 236	Johnston LE-1		ASAT test	Suborbital	Success	
1964-11-18; 20:35:54	TAT SLV-2A Agena-D	Thor 416; Agena 1180	VAFB LC-75-1-1	OPS 3360	Reconnaissance	LEO	Success	
1964-12-09; 02:00	Thor DSV-2F	Thor 247	CCAFS LC-17B	ASSET-5	REV test	Suborbital	Success	Atmospheric flight
1964-12-13; 00:08:10	Thor DSV-2A Ablestar	Thor 427; Ablestar 017	VAFB LC-75-1-2	OPS 6582 (Transit O-2); Transit 5E-5	Navigation	LEO	Success	
1964-12-19; 21:10:16	TAT SLV-2A Agena-D	Thor 424; Agena 1607	VAFB LC-75-3-4	OPS 3358	Reconnaissance	LEO	Success	
1964-12-21; 09:00:03	Delta C	Thor 393; Delta 27	CCAFS LC-17A	Explorer 26	Magnetospheric	MEO	Success	
1964-12-21; 19:08:56	TAT SLV-2A Agena-D	Thor 425; Agena 2355	VAFB LC-75-1-1	OPS 3762 (Quill)	Reconnaissance	LEO	Success	

== 1965 ==
There were 36 Thor missiles launched in 1965. 33 of the 36 launches were successful, giving a 91.6% success rate.

Date/Time (UTC)	Rocket	S/N	Launch site	Payload	Function	Orbit	Outcome	Remarks
1965-01-15; 21:00	TAT SLV-2A Agena-D	Thor 414; Agena 1608	VAFB LC-75-3-5	OPS 3928 (KH-4A #1016)	Reconnaissance	LEO	Success	
1965-01-19; 05:03	Thor MG-18	Thor 224	VAFB SLC-10W	DMSP-3B-F1	Military weather satellite	planned: LEO / SSO	Partial failure	Maiden flight of the Thor-Burner series. Satellite failed to separate from the upper stage, but the satellite was able to operate for 6 months.
1965-01-22; 07:55	Delta C	Thor 374; Delta 28	CCAFS LC-17A	TIROS-9	Weather Satellite	LEO / SSO	Success	
1965-02-03; 16:33	Delta C	Thor 411; Delta 29	CCAFS LC-17B	OSO 2	Solar observation satellite	LEO	Success	
1965-02-23; 14:36	Thor DSV-2G	Thor 248	CCAFS LC-17B	ASSET-6	REV test	Suborbital	Success	Atmospheric flight
1965-02-25; 21:44	TAT SLV-2A Agena-D	Thor 432; Agena 1611	VAFB PALC-1-1	OPS 4782 (KH-4A #1017)	Reconnaissance	LEO	Success	
1965-03-09; 18:29	Thor DM-21 Agena-D	Thor 419; Agena 2701	VAFB SLC-2W	SECOR 3 / Dodecapole 1 / Poppy 4 / Solrad 7B / GGSE 2 / GGSE 3 / Surcal 4 / Oscar 3	Geodesic research / Radar calibration / ELINT / ELINT / Technological test / Technological test / Technological test / Amateur radio satellite	LEO	Success	
1965-03-11; 13:39	Thor-Ablestar	Thor 440; Ablestar 018	VAFB LC-75-1-1	OPS 7087 (Transit O-3); SECOR 2	Navigation; Geodesy	LEO	Success	
1965-03-18; 04:43	Thor MG-18	Thor 306	VAFB SLC-10W	DMSP-3B-F2	Military weather satellite	LEO / SSO	Success	
1965-03-25; 21:11	TAT SLV-2A Agena-D	Thor 432; Agena 1611	VAFB LC-75-3-4	OPS 4782 (KH-4A #1018)	Reconnaissance	LEO	Success	
1965-04-05; 07:20	Thor DSV-2J	Thor 155	Johnston LE-2		ASAT test	Suborbital	Success	
1965-04-06; 23:45	Delta D	Thor 426; Delta 30	CCAFS LC-17A	Intelsat I (Intelsat-1-1 / Early Bird)	Communication satellite	GTO	Success	Performed first transcontinental satellite TV broadcast.
1965-04-29; 21:44	TAT SLV-2A Agena-D	Thor 437; Agena 1614	VAFB PALC-1-1	OPS 5023 (KH-4A #1019)	Reconnaissance	LEO	Success	
1965-05-18; 18:02	TAT SLV-2A Agena-D	Thor 438; Agena 1615	VAFB LC-75-3-4	OPS 8431 (KH-4A #1021)	Reconnaissance	LEO	Success	
1965-05-20; 16:30	Thor Burner 1	Thor 282	VAFB SLC-10W	DMSP-3B-F3	Military weather satellite	LEO / SSO	Success	
1965-05-29; 12:00	Delta C	Thor 441; Delta 31	CCAFS LC-17B	Explorer 28 (IMP-C)	Interplanetary space research satellite	HEO	Success	
1965-06-09; 21:53	TAT SLV-2A Agena-D	Thor 444; Agena 1613	VAFB LC-75-3-5	OPS 8425 (KH-4A #1020)	Reconnaissance	LEO	Success	
1965-06-24; 22:35	Thor-Ablestar	Thor 447; Ablestar 019	VAFB LC-75-1-1	OPS 8480 (Transit O-4)	Navigation	LEO	Success	
1965-07-02; 04:04	Delta C	Thor 415; Delta 32	CCAFS LC-17B	TIROS-10	Weather Satellite	LEO / SSO	Success	
1965-07-17; 05:55	TAT SLV-2A Agena-D	Thor 422; Agena 2702	VAFB LC-75-1-2	OPS 8411 (Samos-F3 #4 )	ELINT	LEO	Success	
1965-07-19; 22:01	TAT SLV-2A Agena-D	Thor 446; Agena 1617	VAFB PALC-1-1	OPS 5543 (KH-4A #1022)	Reconnaissance	LEO	Success	
1965-08-13; 22:11	Thor-Ablestar	Thor 455; Ablestar 020	VAFB LC-75-1-1	OPS 8464 (Transit O-5); Dodecapole 2 Tempsat 1 Surcal 5 Long Rod 1 Calsphere 2	Navigation; Calibration	LEO	Success	Final flight of Thor-Ablestar
1965-08-17; 20:59	TAT SLV-2A Agena-D	Thor 449; Agena 1618	VAFB PALC-1-1	OPS 7208 (KH-4A #1023)	Reconnaissance	LEO	Success	
1965-08-25; 15:17	Delta C	Thor 434; Delta 33	CCAFS LC-17B	OSO C	Solar observation satellite	planned: LEO	Failure	Third stage ignited while still attached to the second stage.
1965-09-02; 20:00	Thor DM-21 Agena-D	Thor 401; Agena 1602	VAFB LC-75-3-5	MPRV	Upper atmosphere and space experiments	planned: MEO	Failure	High winds caused the vehicle to drift off course. RSO T+43 seconds. Debris fell on a trailer park.
1965-09-10; 04:41	Thor Burner 1	Thor 213	VAFB SLC-10W	DMSP-3B-F4	Military weather satellite	LEO / SSO	Success	
1965-09-22; 21:31	TAT SLV-2A Agena-D	Thor 458; Agena 1619	VAFB PALC-1-1	OPS 7221 (KH-4A #1024)	Reconnaissance	LEO	Success	
1965-10-05; 17:45	TAT SLV-2A Agena-D	Thor 433; Agena 1616	VAFB LC-75-3-5	OPS 5325 (KH-4A #1025)	Reconnaissance	LEO	Success	
1965-10-14; 13:11	TAT SLV-2A Agena-D	Thor 435; Agena 680	VAFB LC-75-1-1	OGO 2	Magnetosphere research satellite	LEO	Success	
1965-10-28; 21:17	TAT SLV-2A Agena-D	Thor 439; Agena 1620	VAFB PALC-1-1	OPS 2155 (KH-4A #1026)	Reconnaissance	LEO	Success	
1965-11-06; 18:43	Delta E	Thor 457; Delta 34	CCAFS LC-17A	Explorer 29 (GEOS-A)	Geodetic research satellite	MEO	Success	
1965-11-29; 04:48	Thor DM-21 Agena-B	Thor 453; Agena 6102	VAFB LC-75-1-1	Alouette 2 / Explorer 31 (DME)	Ionospheric research satellite / Ionospheric research satellite	MEO	Success	
1965-12-07; 02:28	Thor DSV-2J	Thor 188	Johnston LE-2		ASAT test / Satellite Inspection Test	Suborbital	Success	
1965-12-09; 21:10	TAT SLV-2A Agena-D	Thor 448; Agena 1621	VAFB LC-75-3-5	OPS 7249 (KH-4A #1027)	Reconnaissance	LEO	Success	
1965-12-16; 07:31	Delta E	Thor 460; Delta 35	CCAFS LC-17A	Pioneer 6	Interplanetary space research probe	Heliocentric	Success	Probe continues to work as of late 2000.
1965-12-24; 21:06	TAT SLV-2A Agena-D	Thor 451; Agena 1610	VAFB LC-75-3-4	OPS 4639 (KH-4A #1028)	Reconnaissance	LEO	Success	

== 1966 ==
There were 27 Thor missiles launched in 1966. 25 of the 27 launches were successful, giving a 92.6% success rate.

Date/Time (UTC)	Rocket	S/N	Launch site	Payload	Function	Orbit	Outcome	Remarks
1966-01-08; 04:48	Thor Burner 1	Thor 251	VAFB SLC-10W	DMSP-3B-F5	Military weather satellite	planned: LEO / SSO	Failure	FW-4S second-stage motor failed to ignite.
1966-01-18; 18:11	Thor DSV-2J	Thor 242	Johnston LE-2		ASAT test / Satellite Inspection Test	Suborbital	Success	
1966-02-02; 21:32	TAT SLV-2A Agena-D	Thor 450; Agena 1623	VAFB PALC-1-1	OPS 7291 (KH-4A #1029)	Reconnaissance	LEO	Success	
1966-02-03; 07:41	Delta C	Thor 445; Delta 36	CCAFS LC-17A	ESSA-1	Weather Satellite	LEO / SSO	Success	
1966-02-09; 19:45	TAT SLV-2A Agena-D	Thor 428; Agena 2703	VAFB LC-75-1-2	OPS 1439 (Samos-F3 #5 )	ELINT	LEO	Success	
1966-02-28; 13:58	Delta E	Thor 461; Delta 37	CCAFS LC-17B	ESSA-2	Weather Satellite	LEO / SSO	Success	
1966-03-09; 22:02	TAT SLV-2A Agena-D	Thor 452; Agena 1622	VAFB LC-75-3-4	OPS 3488 (KH-4A #1030)	Reconnaissance	LEO	Success	
1966-03-12; 00:42	Thor DSV-2J	Thor 196	Johnston LE-2		ASAT test / Satellite Inspection Test	Suborbital	Success	
1966-03-31; 05:41	Thor Burner 1	Thor 147	VAFB SLC-10W	DMSP-3B-F6	Military weather satellite	LEO / SSO	Success	
1966-04-07; 22:02	TAT SLV-2A Agena-D	Thor 474; Agena 1627	VAFB PALC-1-1	OPS 1612 (KH-4A #1031)	Reconnaissance	LEO	Success	
1966-05-03; 19:25	TAT SLV-2A Agena-D	Thor 465; Agena 1625	VAFB LC-75-3-5	OPS 1508 (KH-4A #1032)	Reconnaissance	planned: LEO	Failure	Agena failed to separate from the Thor at staging. Vehicle fell into the Pacific Ocean.
1966-05-15; 07:55	TAT SLV-2A Agena-B	Thor 456; Agena 6202	VAFB LC-75-1-1	Nimbus 2	Weather satellite	LEO / SSO	Success	
1966-05-24; 02:00	TAT SLV-2A Agena-D	Thor 469; Agena 1630	VAFB PALC-1-1	OPS 1778 (KH-4A #1033)	Reconnaissance	LEO	Success	
1966-05-25; 14:00	Delta C1	Thor 436; Delta 38	CCAFS LC-17B	Explorer 32 (AE-B)	Atmospheric research Satellite	LEO	Success	
1966-06-21; 21:31	TAT SLV-2A Agena-D	Thor 466; Agena 1626	VAFB LC-75-3-5	OPS 1599 (KH-4A #1034)	Reconnaissance	LEO	Success	
1966-06-24; 00:12	TAT SLV-2A Agena-D	Thor 473; Agena 631	VAFB LC-75-1-1	PAGEOS-1	Geodesic research satellite	MEO	Success	
1966-07-01; 16:04	Delta E1	Thor 467; Delta 39	CCAFS LC-17A	Explorer 33 (IMP-D)	Magnetosphere research Satellite	HEO	Success	
1966-07-02; 22:53	Thor DSV-2J	Thor 289	Johnston LE-2		ASAT test / Satellite Inspection Test	Suborbital	Success	
1966-08-09; 20:46	Thorad SLV-2G Agena-D	Thor 506; Agena 1631	VAFB SLC-1W	KH-4A (S/N 1036)	Reconnaissance	LEO	Success	Maiden flight of Thorad-Agena
1966-08-17; 15:20	Delta E1	Thor 462; Delta 40	CCAFS LC-17A	Pioneer 7	Interplanetary space research probe	Heliocentric	Success	
1966-09-16; 04:36	Thor Burner 2	Thor 167	VAFB SLC-10W	DMSP-4A-F1	Military weather satellite	LEO / SSO	Success	
1966-09-20; 21:14	TAT SLV-2A Agena-D	Thor 477; Agena 1628	VAFB SLC-3W	OPS 1703 (KH-4A #1035)	Reconnaissance	LEO	Success	
1966-10-02; 10:34	Delta E	Thor 463; Delta 41	VAFB SLC-2E	ESSA-3	Weather Satellite	LEO / SSO	Success	First Delta launch from VAFB
1966-10-26; 23:05	Delta E1	Thor 464; Delta 42	CCAFS SLC-17B	Intelsat 2-1	Communication Satellite	GTO	Success	
1966-11-08; 19:53	Thorad SLV-2G Agena-D	Thor 507; Agena 1632	VAFB SLC-1W	KH-4A (S/N 1037)	Reconnaissance	LEO	Success	
1966-12-14; 19:26	Delta G	Thor 471; Delta 43	CCAFS LC-17A	Biosatellite 1	Life science research satellite	LEO	Success	
1966-12-29; 12:00	TAT SLV-2A Agena-D	Thor 459; Agena 2731	VAFB SLC-2W	OPS 1584 (Samos-F3 #6 )	ELINT	LEO	Success	

== 1967 ==
There were 29 Thor missiles launched in 1967. 28 of the 29 launches were successful, giving a 96.6% success rate.

Date/Time (UTC)	Rocket	S/N	Launch site	Payload	Function	Orbit	Outcome	Remarks
1967-01-11; 10:55	Delta E1	Thor 468; Delta 44	CCAFS SLC-17B	Intelsat 2-2	Communication Satellite	GTO	Success	
1967-01-14; 21:28	TAT SLV-2A Agena-D	Thor 495; Agena 1629	VAFB SLC-2W	OPS 1664 (KH-4A #1038)	Reconnaissance	LEO	Success	
1967-01-26; 17:31	Delta E	Thor 472; Delta 45	VAFB SLC-2E	ESSA-4	Weather Satellite	LEO / SSO	Success	
1967-02-08; 08:00	Thor Burner 2	Thor 169	VAFB SLC-10W	DMSP-4A-F2	Military weather satellite	LEO / SSO	Success	
1967-02-22; 22:02	TAT SLV-2A Agena-D	Thor 493; Agena 1635	VAFB SLC-2W	OPS 4750 (KH-4A #1039)	Reconnaissance	LEO	Success	
1967-03-08; 16:19	Delta C	Thor 431; Delta 46	CCAFS LC-17A	OSO 3	Solar observation satellite	LEO	Success	
1967-03-23; 01:30	Delta E1	Thor 470; Delta 47	CCAFS SLC-17B	Intelsat 2-3	Communication Satellite	GTO	Success	
1967-03-30; 18:54	TAT SLV-2A Agena-D	Thor 501; Agena 1636	VAFB SLC-2W	OPS 4779 (KH-4A #1040)	Reconnaissance	LEO	Success	
1967-03-31; 06:44	Thor DSV-2J	Thor 168	Johnston LE-1		ASAT test	Suborbital	Success	
1967-04-20; 11:17	Delta E	Thor 484; Delta 48	VAFB SLC-2E	ESSA-5	Weather Satellite	LEO / SSO	Success	
1967-05-09; 21:50	Thorad SLV-2G Agena-D	Thor 508; Agena 1634	VAFB SLC-1E	KH-4A (S/N 1041)/SRV S/N 731	Reconnaissance	planned: LEO	Partial failure	Rocket failed to cut off, resulting in incorrect, but usable orbit
1967-05-24; 14:06	Delta E1	Thor 486; Delta 49	VAFB SLC-2E	Explorer 34 (IMP-F)	Interplanetary space research satellite	HEO	Success	
1967-05-31; 09:30	Thor DM-21 Agena-D	Thor 443; Agena 2704	VAFB SLC-2W	Timation 1 / GGSE 4 / GGSE 5 / Poppy 5 / Calsphere 3 / Calsphere 4 / Surcal 152 / Surcal 153 / Surcal 150B	Experimental navigation satellite / Technological research satellite / ELINT / Technological research satellites (x5)	LEO	Success	Final flight of the original Thor-Agena series.
1967-06-16; 21:35	Thorad SLV-2G Agena-D	Thor 509; Agena 1633	VAFB SLC-1W	KH-4A (S/N 1042)/SRV S/N 725	Reconnaissance	LEO	Success	
1967-06-29; 21:01	Thor Burner 2	Thor 171	VAFB SLC-10W	Aurora (P67-1) / SECOR-9	Magnetosphere research satellite / Geodesic research satellite	MEO	Success	
1967-07-19; 14:19	Delta E1	Thor 488; Delta 50	CCAFS SLC-17B	Explorer 35 (IMP-E)	Interplanetary space research satellite	Lunar Orbit	Success	
1967-07-25; 03:48	TAT SLV-2A Agena-D	Thor 496; Agena 2732	VAFB SLC-2W	OPS 1879 (Samos-F3 #7 )	ELINT	LEO	Success	
1967-07-28; 14:21	TAT SLV-2A Agena-D	Thor 478; Agena 681	VAFB SLC-2E	OGO 4	Magnetosphere research satellite	LEO	Success	
1967-08-07; 21:44	Thorad SLV-2G Agena-D	Thor 510; Agena 1637	VAFB SLC-1E	KH-4A (S/N 1043)	Reconnaissance	LEO	Success	
1967-08-23; 04:41	Thor Burner 2	Thor 266	VAFB SLC-10W	DMSP-4A-F3	Military weather satellite	LEO / SSO	Success	
1967-09-07; 22:04	Delta G	Thor 475; Delta 51	CCAFS LC-17B	Biosatellite 2	Life science research satellite	LEO	Success	
1967-09-15; 19:41	Thorad SLV-2G Agena-D	Thor 512; Agena 1641	VAFB SLC-1W	KH-4B (S/N 1101)	Reconnaissance	LEO	Success	First KH-4B satellite
1967-09-28; 00:45	Delta E1	Thor 442; Delta 52	CCAFS SLC-17B	Intelsat 2-4	Communication Satellite	GTO	Success	
1967-10-11; 07:57	Thor Burner 2	Thor 268	VAFB SLC-10W	DMSP-4A-F4	Military weather satellite	LEO / SSO	Success	
1967-10-18; 16:04	Delta C	Thor 490; Delta 53	CCAFS LC-17B	OSO 4	Solar observation satellite	LEO	Success	
1967-11-02; 21:31	Thorad SLV-2G Agena-D	Thor 513; Agena 1639	VAFB SLC-1E	KH-4A (S/N 1044)/SRV S/N 733	Reconnaissance	LEO	Success	
1967-11-10; 18:00	Delta E1	Thor 480; Delta 54	VAFB SLC-2E	ESSA-6	Weather Satellite	LEO / SSO	Success	
1967-12-09; 22:26	Thorad SLV-2G Agena-D	Thor 514; Agena 1642	VAFB SLC-1W	KH-4B (S/N 1102)	Reconnaissance	LEO	Success	
1967-12-13; 14:08	Delta E1	Thor 489; Delta 55	CCAFS LC-17B	Pioneer 8 / TTS-1	Interplanetary space research probe / Technology demonstration satellite	Heliocentric	Success	

== 1968 ==
There were 23 Thor missiles launched in 1968. 21 of the 23 launches were successful, giving a 91.3% success rate.

Date/Time (UTC)	Rocket	S/N	Launch site	Payload	Function	Orbit	Outcome	Remarks
1968-01-11; 16:19	Delta E1	Thor 454; Delta 56	VAFB SLC-2E	Explorer 36 (GEOS-B)	Geodetic research satellite	LEO / SSO	Success	
1968-01-17; 10:12	TAT SLV-2A Agena-D	Thor 498; Agena 2733	VAFB SLC-2W	OPS 1965 (Samos-F3 #8 )	ELINT	LEO	Success	Final flight of the TAT Thor-Agena series.
1968-01-24; 22:26	Thorad SLV-2G Agena-D	Thor 516; Agena 1640	VAFB SLC-1E	KH-4A (S/N 1045)/SRV S/N 741	Reconnaissance	LEO	Success	
1968-03-14; 22:00	Thorad SLV-2G Agena-D	Thor 518; Agena 1638	VAFB SLC-1E	KH-4A (S/N 1046)/SRV S/N 747	Reconnaissance	LEO	Success	
1968-05-01; 21:31	Thorad SLV-2G Agena-D	Thor 511; Agena 1643	VAFB SLC-3W	KH-4B (S/N 1103)/SRV S/N 807	Reconnaissance	LEO	Success	
1968-05-14; 07:05	Thor DSV-2J	Thor 205	Johnston LE-1		ASAT test	Suborbital	Success	
1968-05-18; 08:23	Thorad SLV-2G Agena-D	Thor 520; Agena 6221	VAFB SLC-2E	Nimbus B/EGRS-10	Weather Satellite / Geodesic research satellite	planned: LEO / SSO	Failure	Incorrectly installed yaw gyro led to loss of control. RSO T+101 seconds.
1968-05-23; 04:38	Thor Burner 2	Thor 277	VAFB SLC-10W	DMSP-4B-F1	Military weather satellite	LEO / SSO	Success	
1968-06-20; 21:46	Thorad SLV-2G Agena-D	Thor 517; Agena 1645	VAFB SLC-1E	KH-4A (S/N 1047)/SRV S/N 745	Reconnaissance	LEO	Success	
1968-07-04; 17:31	Delta J	Thor 476; Delta 57	VAFB SLC-2E	Explorer 38 (RAE-A)	Radio astronomy satellite	MEO	Success	
1968-08-07; 21:36	Thorad SLV-2G Agena-D	Thor 522; Agena 1644	VAFB SLC-3W	KH-4B (S/N 1104)	Reconnaissance	LEO	Success	
1968-08-16; 11:31	Delta N	Thor 528; Delta 58	VAFB SLC-2E	ESSA-7	Weather Satellite	LEO / SSO	Success	Maiden Flight of the Long Tank Thor-Delta
1968-09-18; 21:32	Thorad SLV-2G Agena-D	Thor 524; Agena 1647	VAFB SLC-1E	KH-4A (S/N 1048)/SRV S/N 749	Reconnaissance	LEO	Success	
1968-09-19; 00:09	Delta M	Thor 529; Delta 59	CCAFS SLC-17A	Intelsat 3-1	Communication Satellite	planned: GTO	Failure	Pitch gyroscope failure led to loss of control starting at T+20 seconds. RSO T+110 seconds.
1968-10-05; 11:16	Thorad SLV-2G Agena-D	Thor 521; Agena 2734	VAFB SLC-1W	Ferret 13 (OPS 0964)	ELINT	LEO	Success	
1968-10-23; 04:34	Thor Burner 2	Thor 173	VAFB SLC-10W	DMSP-4B-F2	Military weather satellite	LEO / SSO	Success	
1968-11-03; 21:30	Thorad SLV-2G Agena-D	Thor 515; Agena 1646	VAFB SLC-3W	KH-4B (S/N 1105)/SRV S/N 741	Reconnaissance	LEO	Success	
1968-11-08; 09:46	Delta E1	Thor 479; Delta 60	CCAFS LC-17B	Pioneer 9 / TTS-2	Interplanetary space research probe / Technology demonstration satellite	Heliocentric	Success	
1968-11-20; 07:08	Thor DSV-2J	Thor 252	Johnston LE-1		ASAT test	Suborbital	Success	
1968-12-05; 18:55	Delta E1	Thor 481; Delta 61	CCAFS LC-17B	HEOS 1	Magnetosphere research satellite	HEO	Success	
1968-12-12; 22:22	Thorad SLV-2G Agena-D	Thor 527; Agena 1648	VAFB SLC-3W	KH-4A (S/N 1049)/SRV S/N 751	Reconnaissance	LEO	Success	
1968-12-15; 17:17	Delta N	Thor 532; Delta 62	VAFB SLC-2E	ESSA-8	Weather Satellite	LEO / SSO	Success	
1968-12-19; 00:32	Delta M	Thor 536; Delta 63	CCAFS SLC-17A	Intelsat 3-2	Communication Satellite	GTO	Success	

== 1969 ==
There were 22 Thor missiles launched in 1969. 20 of the 22 launches were successful, giving a 90.9% success rate.

Date/Time (UTC)	Rocket	S/N	Launch site	Payload	Function	Orbit	Outcome	Remarks
1969-01-22; 16:48	Delta C1	Thor 487; Delta 64	CCAFS LC-17B	OSO 5	Solar observation satellite	LEO	Success	
1969-01-30; 06:43	Delta E1	Thor 485; Delta 65	VAFB SLC-2E	ISIS-I	Ionosphere research satellite	MEO	Success	
1969-02-05; 21:59	Thorad SLV-2G Agena-D	Thor 519; Agena 1650	VAFB SLC-3W	KH-4B (S/N 1106)/SRV S/N 801R	Reconnaissance	LEO	Success	
1969-02-06; 00:39	Delta M	Thor 530; Delta 66	CCAFS SLC-17A	Intelsat 3-3	Communication Satellite	GTO	Success	
1969-02-26; 07:47	Delta E1	Thor 483; Delta 67	CCAFS SLC-17B	ESSA-9	Weather Satellite	LEO / SSO	Success	
1969-03-19; 21:38	Thorad SLV-2G Agena-D	Thor 541; Agena 1651	VAFB SLC-3W	KH-4B (S/N 1150)/SRV S/N 737	Reconnaissance	LEO	Success	Satellite later failed
1969-04-14; 07:54	Thorad SLV-2G Agena-D	Thor 543; Agena 6222	VAFB SLC-2E	Nimbus 3/Secor 13	Weather satellite / Geodesic research satellite	LEO / SSO	Success	
1969-05-02; 01:46	Thorad SLV-2G Agena-D	Thor 544; Agena 1649	VAFB SLC-3W	KH-4A (S/N 1051)/SRV S/N 739	Reconnaissance	LEO	Success	
1969-05-22; 02:00	Delta M	Thor 533; Delta 68	CCAFS SLC-17A	Intelsat 3-4	Communication Satellite	GTO	Success	
1969-06-05; 14:42	Thorad SLV-2H Agena-D	Thor 526; Agena 6803	VAFB SLC-2E	OGO 6	Magnetosphere research satellite	LEO	Success	Maiden flight of SLV-2H
1969-06-21; 08:53	Delta E1	Thor 482; Delta 69	VAFB SLC-2W	Explorer 41 (IMP-G)	Interplanetary space research satellite	HEO	Success	
1969-06-29; 13:26	Delta N	Thor 539; Delta 70	CCAFS SLC-17A	Biosatellite 3	Life science research satellite	LEO	Success	
1969-07-23; 04:39	Thor Burner 2	Thor 279	VAFB SLC-10W	DMSP-4B-F3	Military weather satellite	LEO / SSO	Success	
1969-07-24; 01:30	Thorad SLV-2H Agena-D	Thor 545; Agena 1652	VAFB SLC-3W	KH-4B (S/N 1107)	Reconnaissance	LEO	Success	
1969-07-26; 02:06	Delta M	Thor 547; Delta 71	CCAFS SLC-17A	Intelsat 3-5	Communication Satellite	planned: GTO	Partial failure	Stage 3 motor case ruptured, leaving spacecraft in unusable orbit
1969-07-31; 10:19	Thorad SLV-2G Agena-D	Thor 523; Agena 2735	VAFB SLC-1W	Ferret 14 (OPS 8285)	ELINT	LEO	Success	
1969-08-09; 07:32	Delta N	Thor 548; Delta 72	CCAFS LC-17A	OSO 6 / PAC-1	Solar observation satellite / Technology test	GTO	Success	
1969-08-27; 21:59	Delta L	Thor 540; Delta 73	CCAFS LC-17A	Pioneer E / TTS-3	Interplanetary space research probe / Technology demonstration satellite	planned: Heliocentric	Failure	Defective valve in Stage 1 caused a hydraulic fluid leak and loss of engine gimbaling at T+220 seconds, making it impossible for the second stage to reach orbit. RSO T+480 seconds.
1969-09-22; 21:11	Thorad SLV-2G Agena-D	Thor 531; Agena 1653	VAFB SLC-3W	KH-4A (S/N 1052)/SRV S/N 743R	Reconnaissance	LEO	Success	
1969-09-30; 13:40	Thorad SLV-2G Agena-D	Thor 525; Agena Unknown	VAFB SLC-1W	EHH B-17 (OPS 1807), Surcal (x5), Timation 2, Tempsat 2, SOICAL (x2)	Experimental navigation satellite / Radar calibration / Technological demonstration satellites (x7)	LEO	Success	
1969-11-22; 00:37	Delta M	Thor 554; Delta 74	CCAFS SLC-17A	Skynet 1A	Military communication Satellite	GTO	Success	
1969-12-04; 21:37	Thorad SLV-2H Agena-D	Thor 549; Agena 1655	VAFB SLC-3W	KH-4B (S/N 1108)	Reconnaissance	LEO	Success	

== Images ==
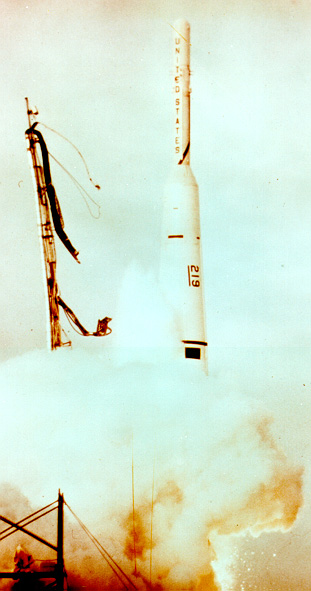
Thor 219

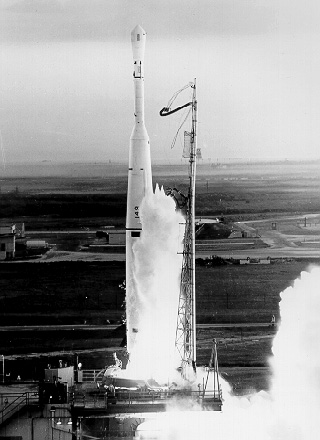
Thor 148

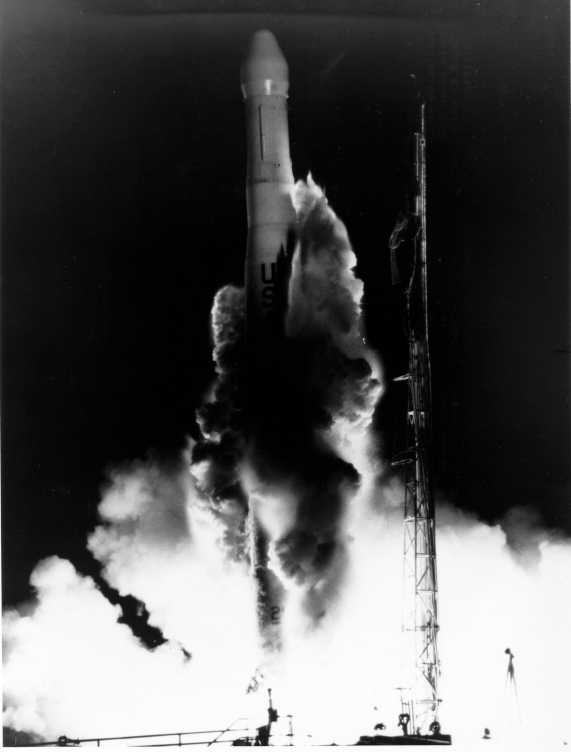
Thor 281

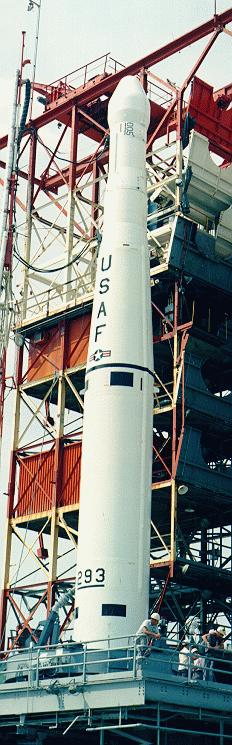
Thor 293

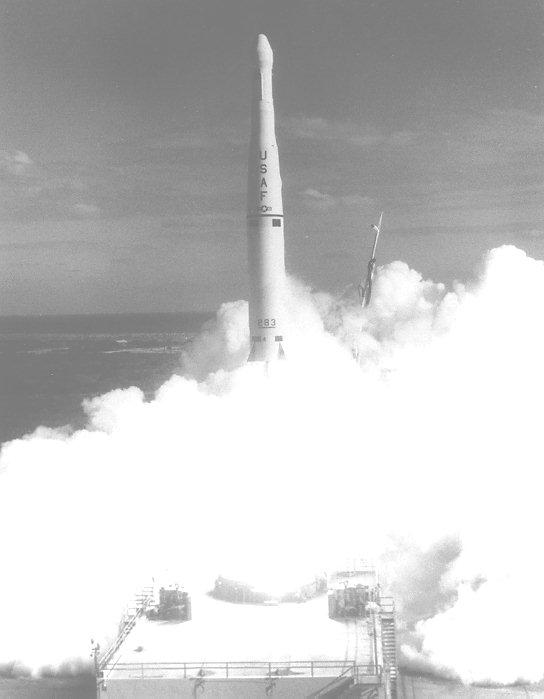
Thor 283

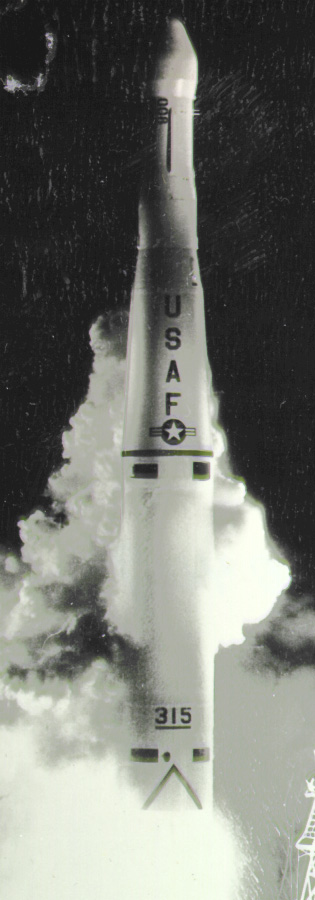
Thor 315

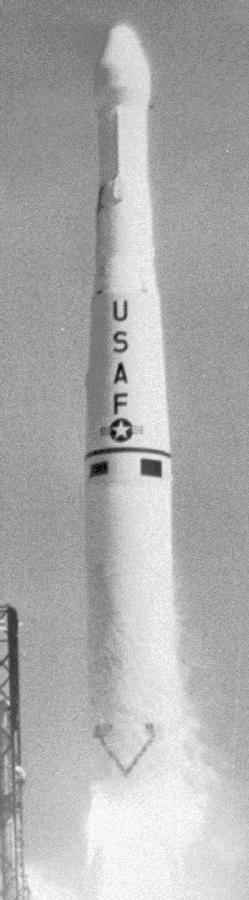
Thor 375

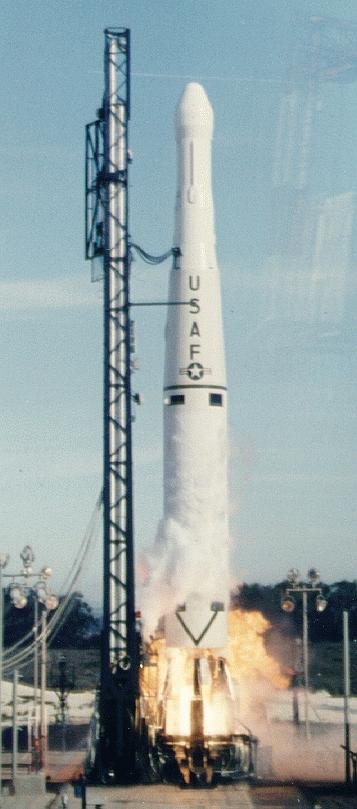
Thor 385

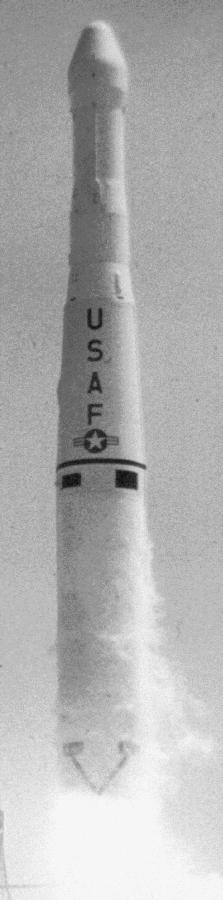
Thor 379

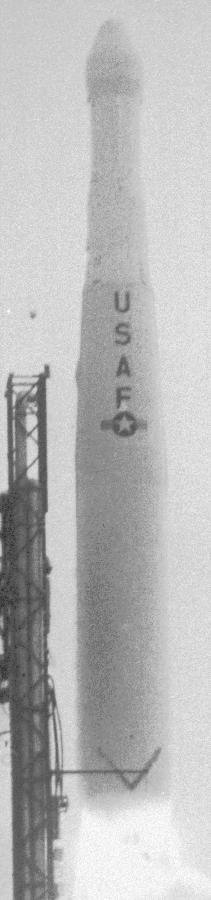
Thor 423

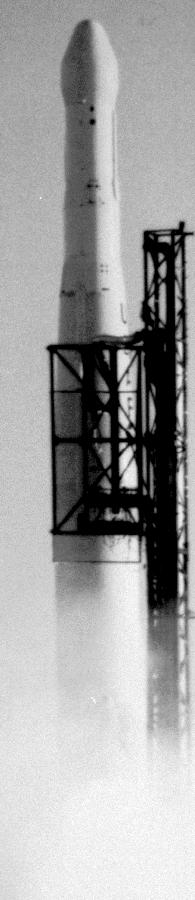
Thor 427

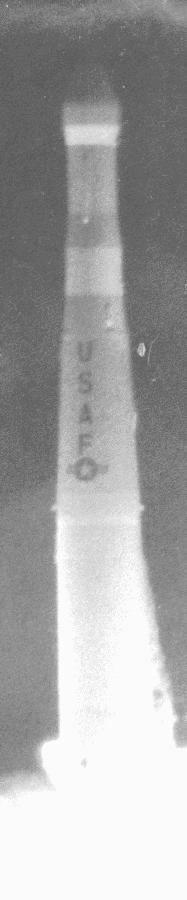
Thor 440

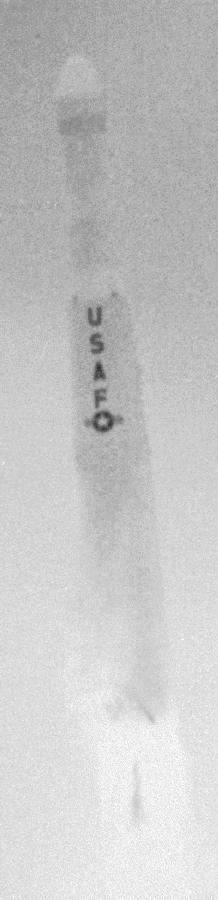
Thor 447

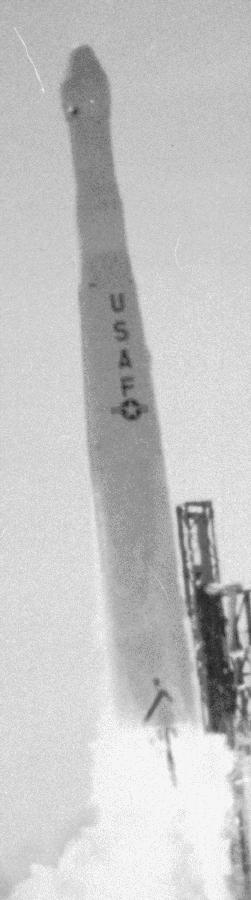
Thor 455
