= Orbiting Geophysical Observatory =

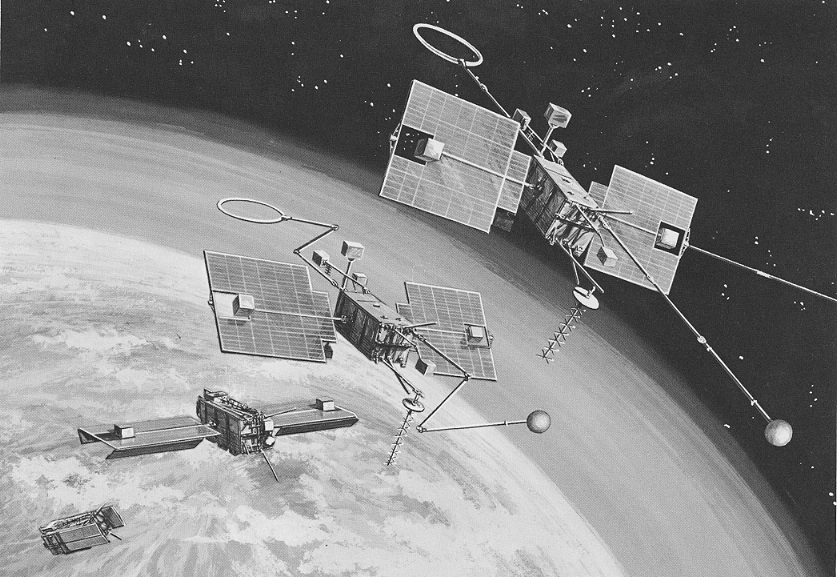
Orbiting Geophysical Observatory (OGO) deployment sequence

Orbiting Geophysical Observatory (OGO) Program of NASA refers to the six satellites launched by the United States that were in use from September 1964 to 1972, designed to study the Earth's magnetosphere. The satellites successfully studied the interactions between the Earth and the Sun, despite a number of technical problems. Each satellite had 20 to 25 instruments. The project manager for all 6 OGO projects was Wilfred Scull.

== OGO satellites ==
The NASA's first OGO satellites employed a standardized bus structure; their box shape earned the label 'streetcar' satellites. They were built by Space Test Laboratories of Los Angeles.

All OGO satellites are built around a common parallelepiped-shaped platform (0.9 × 0.9 × 1.8 m). The satellite's orientation is maintained fixed in space (3-axis stabilized) so that one of the long faces (0.9 × 1.8 m) permanently points towards Earth. On this face, as well as on the opposite face, a surface of 0.6 m² is available for scientific experiments. The attitude control system is also responsible for keeping the solar panels continuously oriented perpendicularly to the solar rays. The cubic SOEP (Solar Oriented Experiment Package) receptacles, attached to the ends of the solar panels on both faces, can accommodate experiments on a surface of 0.1 m². At one end of the satellite's body, two OPEP-1 (Orbital Plane Experiment Package) and OPEP-2 experiment sets are mounted on an adjustable support that keeps them oriented in the direction of the satellite's forward movement. Two booms, 5.7 meters long (EP-5 and EP-6) and four booms, 1.8 meters long (EP-1 to EP-4), hold scientific experiments at their ends that must be kept away from the satellite's body to meet visibility or sensitivity constraints. Additionally, the satellite is equipped with several antennas for telecommunications, the most prominent being an adjustable Yagi antenna. The scientific experiments may have their own antenna, like the one shown in the diagram extending 9 meters from the SOEP-1 experiment on the solar panel. The satellite typically has twelve appendages deployed in orbit in two sequences to avoid any interference.

The attitude control system relies on horizon sensors, cold gas thrusters, and reaction wheels. It allows the satellite to be stabilized on 3 axes with an accuracy of 2° relative to the local vertical, 5° relative to the Sun's direction, and 5° relative to the forward movement axis. The thermal control system uses louvers that open and close to maintain a temperature of 10 to 24°C within the satellite's body and thermal resistors for scientific experiments mounted outside. Electrical power is provided by solar panels that produce 550 watts, of which 50 watts are available for scientific experiments. The energy is stored in two 28-volt nickel-cadmium batteries. The telecommunications system ensures data transfer at a rate between 1 and 64 kilobits per second. Scientific data can be transmitted in real-time or stored temporarily on one of two magnetic tape recorders with a recording speed of 1 to 4 kilobits per second and a reading speed of 64 to 128 kilobits per second.

OGO 1, OGO 3, and OGO 5 were in equatorial orbits; OGO 2, OGO 4, and OGO 6 were in lower polar orbits.

Satellite	Launch date	Rocket	COSPAR	NORAD	Mass	Orbit	End of mission	Reentry
OGO 1 (A)	4 September 1964	Atlas-LV3 Agena B	1964-054A	00879	487 kg	282 km × 149 385 km 37.10°	1 November 1971	29 August 2020
OGO 2 (C)	14 October 1965	Thor-LV3 Agena D	1965-081A	01620	520 kg	415 km × 1 517 km, 87.43°	1 November 1971	17 September 1981
OGO 3 (B)	7 June 1966	Atlas-Agena B	1966-049A	02195	515 kg	319 km × 122 173 km, 31.39°	29 February 1972	14 September 1981
OGO 4 (D)	28 July 1967	Thor-Agena D	1967-073A	02895	562 kg	411 km × 903 km, 86.03°	27 September 1971	16 August 1972
OGO 5 (E)	4 March 1968	Atlas-Agena D	1968-014A	03138	611 kg	232 km × 148 228 km, 31.13°	14 July 1972	2 July 2011
OGO 6 (F)	5 June 1969	Thorad-Agena D	1969-051A	03986	632 kg	397 km × 1 089 km, 82.00°	14 July 1972	12 October 1979

=== OGO 1 ===
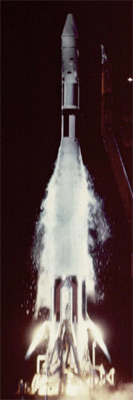
Atlas-LV3 Agena B (195D) with OGO 1

OGO 1 (OGO-A) was successfully launched from Cape Canaveral Air Force Station on September 5, 1964 and placed in an initial orbit of 281 × 149,385 km with an inclination of 31.2°.

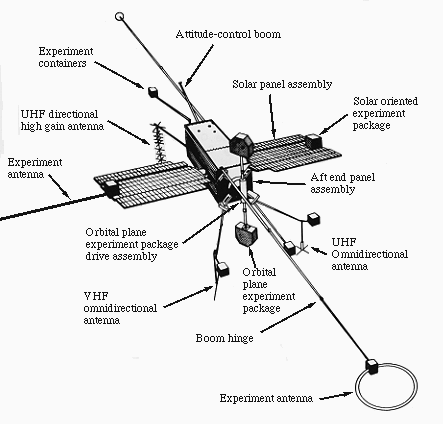
OGO 1 components

The purpose of the OGO 1 spacecraft, the first of a series of six Orbiting Geophysical Observatories, was to conduct diversified geophysical experiments to obtain a better understanding of the Earth as a planet and to develop and operate a standardized observatory-type satellite. OGO 1 consisted of a main body that was parallelepipedal in form, two solar panels, each with a solar-oriented experiment package (SOEP), two orbital plane experiment packages (OPEP) and six appendages EP-1 through EP-6 supporting the boom experiment packages. One face of the main body was designed to point toward the Earth (+Z axis), and the line connecting the two solar panels (X axis) was intended to be perpendicular to the Earth-Sun-spacecraft plane. The solar panels were able to rotate about the X axis. The OPEPs were mounted on and could rotate about an axis which was parallel to the Z axis and attached to the main body.

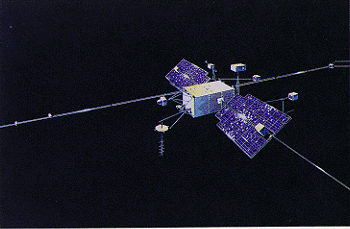
Artist's concept of OGO 1

Due to a boom deployment failure shortly after orbital injection, the spacecraft was put into a permanent spin mode of 5 rpm about the Z axis. This spin axis remained fixed with a declination of about -10 deg and right ascension of about 40 deg at launch. The initial local time of apogee was 2100 h. OGO 1 carried 20 experiments. Twelve of these were particle studies and two were magnetic field studies. In addition, there was one experiment for each of the following types of studies: interplanetary dust, VLF, Lyman-alpha, gegenschein, atmospheric mass, and radio astronomy. Real-time data were transmitted at 1, 8, or 64 kbs depending on the distance of the spacecraft from the Earth. Playback data were tape recorded at 1 kbs and transmitted at 64 kbs. Two wideband transmitters, one feeding into an omnidirectional antenna and the other feeding into a directional antenna, were used to transmit data. A special-purpose telemetry system, feeding into either antenna, was also used to transmit wideband data in real time only. Tracking was accomplished by using radio beacons and a range and range-rate S-band transponder. Because of the boom deployment failure, the best operating mode for the data handling system was the use of one of the wideband transmitters and the directional antenna. All data received from the omnidirectional antenna were noisy. During September 1964, acceptable data were received over 70% of the orbital path. By June 1969, data acquisition was limited to 10% of the orbital path. The spacecraft was placed in a standby status November 25, 1969, and all support was terminated November 1, 1971. By April 1970 the spacecraft perigee had increased to 46,000 km and the inclination had increased to 58.8 deg.

==== OGO-1 reentry ====
The University of Arizona's Catalina Sky Survey (CSS), funded by NASA’s Planetary Defense Coordination Office (PDCO), detected an object late in the evening of 25 August 2020 which appeared to be on an impact trajectory with Earth. Two Maui middle school students also observed the 250-pound (110 kg) object. Maui Waena Intermediate School eighth-graders Holden Suzuki and Wilson Chau, with mentor outreach astronomer J.D. Armstrong of the University of Hawaii Institute for Astronomy (IfA), used data from the Las Cumbres Observatory (LCO) Faulkes Telescope North on Haleakala to track OGO-1. The University of Hawaii's Asteroid Terrestrial-impact Last Alert System (ATLAS), also funded by PDCO, independently observed the object. Further observations were conducted by CSS to confirm the object’s trajectory. Precision orbit calculations were conducted by the Center for Near-Earth Object (NEO) Studies (CNEOS) at NASA’s Jet Propulsion Laboratory, and compared to data from the European Space Agency's NEO Coordination Center. The object was confirmed to be not an asteroid, but in fact Orbiting Geophysical Observatory-1 (OGO-1). OGO-1 reentered Earth's atmosphere and disintegrated on Saturday evening, 29 August 2020 over Southern French Polynesia.

=== OGO 2 ===
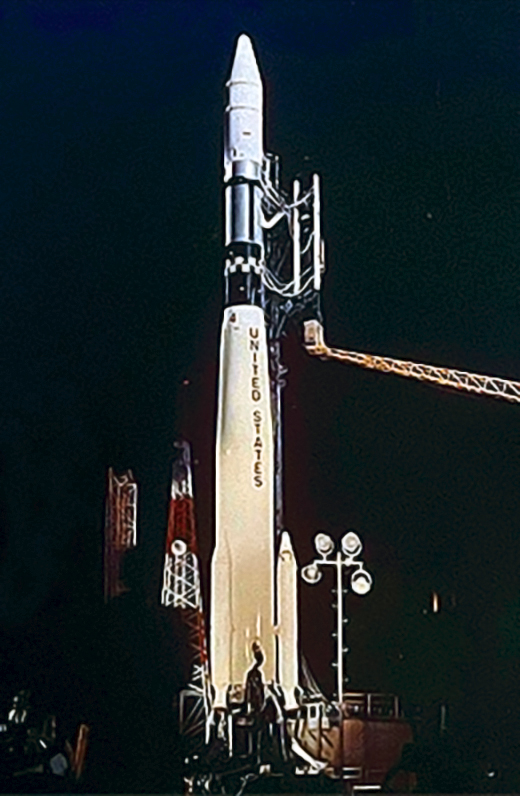
Thor-SLV2A Agena-D (sn 435) with OGO 2. Vandenberg, 14.10.1965

OGO 2 (OGO-C) carried about twenty scientific experiments with the objective of performing observations of polar auroras, atmospheric luminescence, energized particles, variations affecting the magnetic field and the properties of the ionosphere. These observations were to be carried out particularly in the regions overlooking the poles. The satellite was placed in a low polar orbit (414 × 1,510 km with an inclination of 87.4°) on October 14, 1965 by a Thor-Agena D launch vehicle from Vandenberg Air Force Base.

Shortly after launch, the attitude control system exhausted the gas it had available to control the satellite's orientation and the satellite entered a slow rotation. Five of the experiments could no longer operate under these conditions and six others provided degraded results. On April 1966, both accumulators fail and observations are consequently limited to the illuminated portions of the orbit. By December 1966, there are only 8 operational experiments left, of which only 5 provide undegraded results. On November 1, 1967, the satellite was put into standby mode. Due to power problems, the data collected up to that time only covered a total period of 306 days. An instrument was briefly reactivated for two weeks in February 1968, and operations were definitely stopped on November 1, 1971.

=== OGO 3 ===
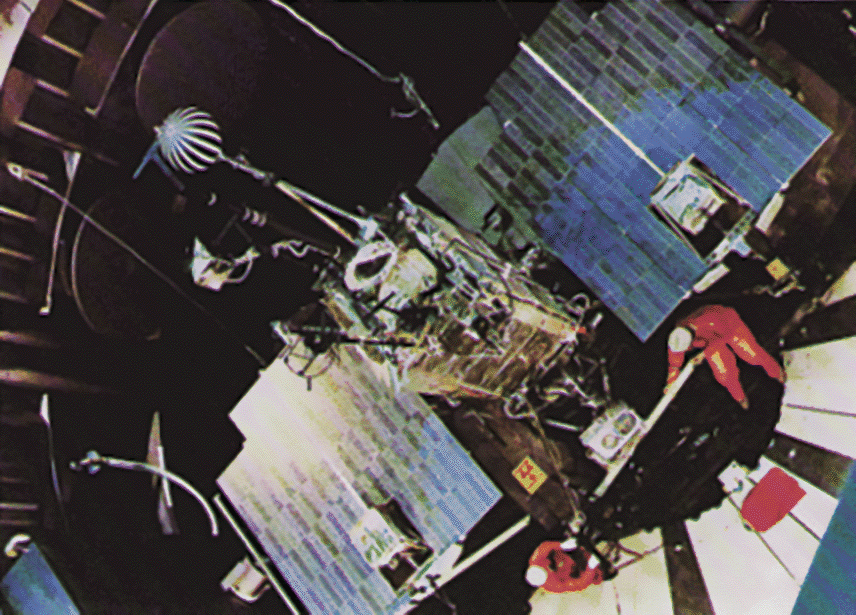
Tests of OGO-3 satellite

OGO 3 (OGO-B) was launched on June 7, 1966 and placed in an orbit of 295 × 122,219 km and 31° inclination. The 21 experiments, forming the largest set of scientific instruments ever placed in orbit, all returned quality data. They were mostly identical to those flown on OGO 1. These included 4 experiments for the study of cosmic radiation, 4 devoted to plasma, two to trapped radiation, two to the Earth's magnetic field, one to the ionosphere, 3 to the study of optical radiation and radio emissions and one to micrometeorites. The instrument responsible for detecting positrons and gamma-ray bursts, which had not worked on board OGO 1, provided satisfactory results in a modified version. The satellite remained stabilized on 3 axes for 46 days. At the end of this period on July 23, 1966, a failure of one of the equipment responsible for attitude control forces the operators to stabilize the satellite by putting it into rotation (with rotation period between 90 and 125 seconds). From June 1969, data collection can only be done over 50% of the orbit. Regular data collection ends on December 1, 1969, and the mission ends on February 29, 1972.

=== OGO 4 ===
The OGO 4 (OGO-D) satellite was launched on July 28, 1967 by a Thor-Agena D launcher from Vandenberg Air Force Base and placed in a polar orbit of 416 × 900 km with a declination of 86°. The objectives were the same as those of OGO 2. The satellite encounters problems with the attitude control system shortly after launch, but manages to correct them and for 18 months the satellite is stabilized on 3 axes. By mid January 1969 the magnetic tape recording system fails and the operators are no longer able to maintain the satellite's orientation. The satellite is rotated to stabilize it around its vertical axis with a slight precession and an initial period of 202 seconds. In this new configuration, 7 of the experiments are stopped because they can no longer provide viable results. On October 27, 1969, the satellite was put on standby. An experiment in receiving low-frequency waves was reactivated several times between 1970 and 1971, but operations were definitively stopped on September 27, 1971.

=== OGO 5 ===
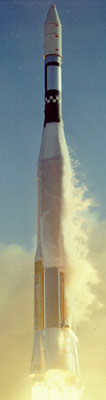
Atlas-SLV3A Agena-D launching OGO 5

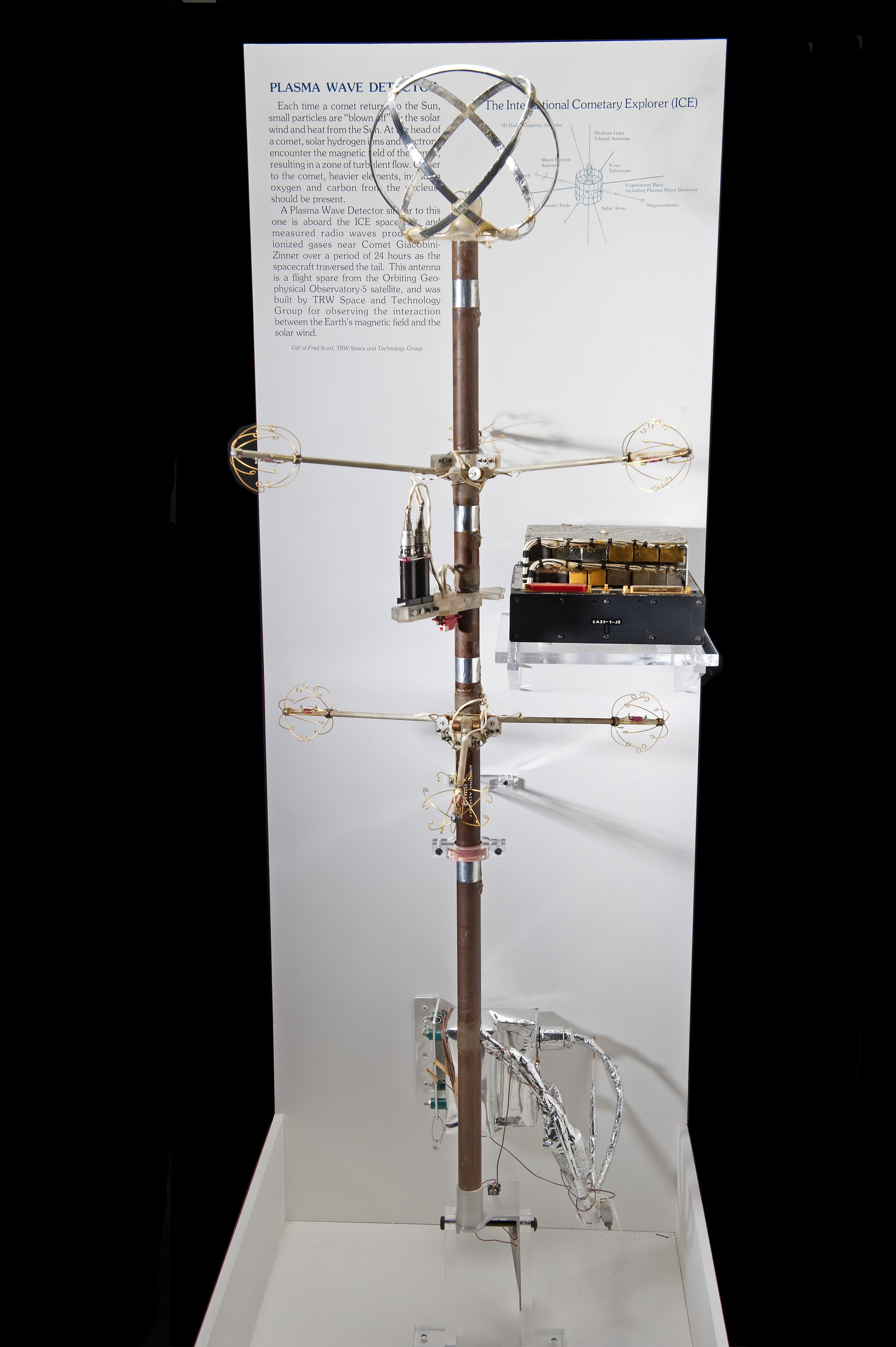
A flight spare for the plasma wave sensor system carried on the OGO-5 satellite

OGO 5 (OGO-E) was launched on March 4, 1969. The satellite was primarily dedicated to Earth observation, with an initial orbit of 272 × 148,228 km with an inclination of 31.1°. The attitude control system suffered a failure on August 6, 1971 and the satellite is put on standby on October 8, 1971. Three experiments were reactivated between June 1 and July 13, 1972, with operations stopping on July 14, 1972.

==== Non-Earth observations ====
In 1970 OGO-5 used its ultraviolet photometer to observe comets Encke, Tago-Sato-Kosaka (1969 IX) and Bennett (1970 II).

=== OGO 6 ===
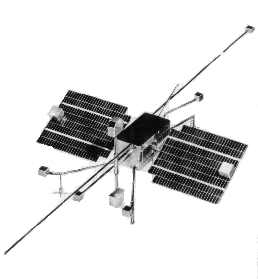
OGO-6 satellite

The OGO 6 (OGO-F) satellite was launched on June 5, 1969 by a Thor-Agena D launcher from Vandenberg Air Force Base and placed in a polar orbit of 413 × 1,077 km with an inclination of 82°. The satellite carried 26 scientific experiments whose objective was to observe the relationships between different characteristics of the upper atmosphere during a period of high solar activity. On June 22, 1969, a fault in a solar panel results in the creation of a negative potential of 20 volts when the solar panels are exposed to the Sun, affecting the results of seven experiments. On October 1969, a row of photovoltaic cells fails without noticeable consequences. One of the two magnetic tape recorders suffered a failure in August 1970. In September 1970, following the degradation of energy production and equipment only 14 scientific experiments are still operating normally while 3 are partially operating and 9 are stopped. But the end of June 1971, power generation problems worsen and the satellite is put on standby. A radio experiment developed by a Japanese laboratory is activated between October 10, 1971 and March 1972. Operations are completely stopped on July 14, 1972.
