= Nimbus 3 =

Former U.S. meteorological satellite

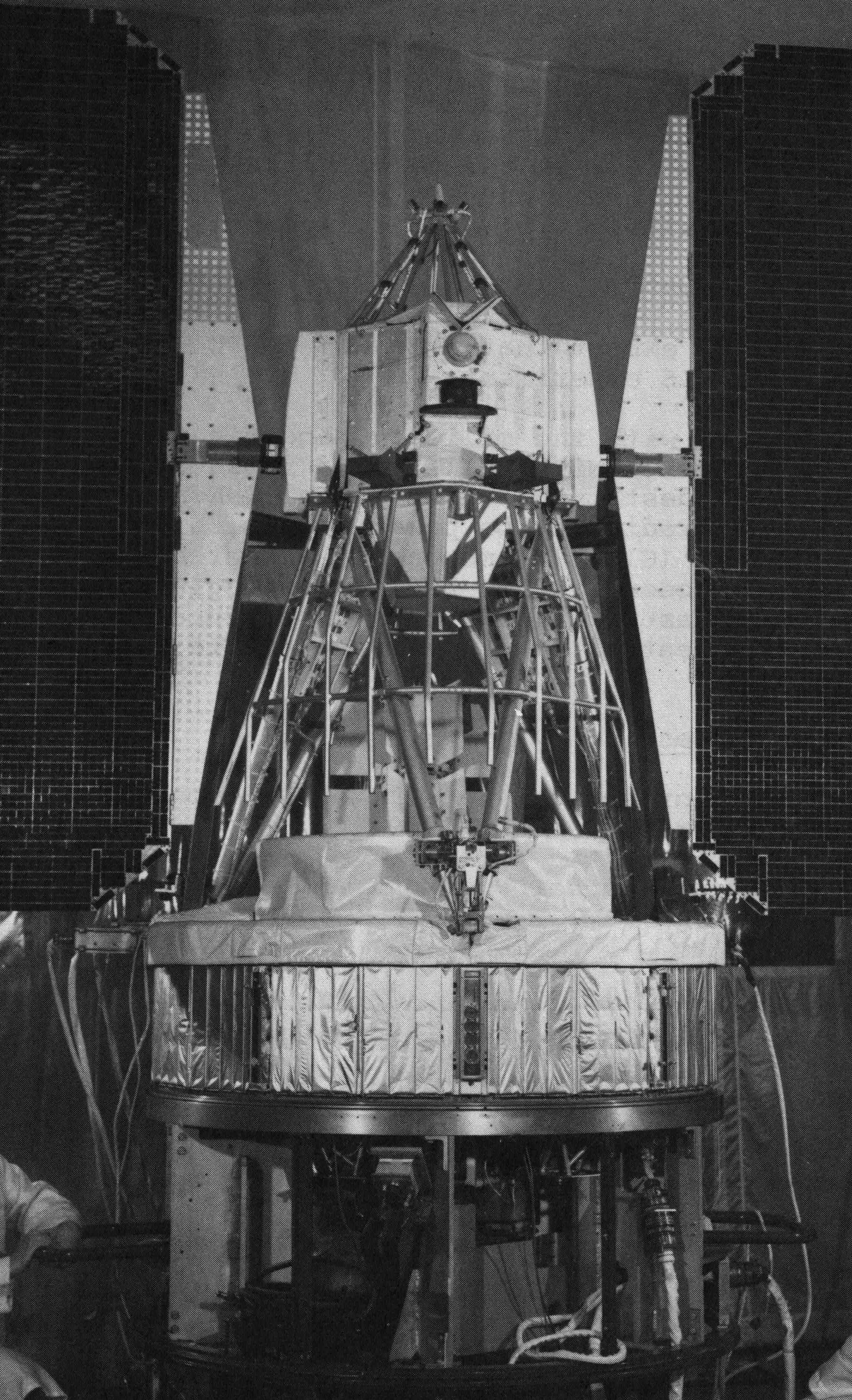
- Mission type: Weather satellite
- Operator: NASA
- COSPAR ID: 1969-037A
- SATCAT no.: 3890
- Mission duration: 2 years and 9 months

Spacecraft properties
- Manufacturer: RCA Astrospace
- Launch mass: 575.6 kilograms (1,269 lb)
- Dimensions: 3.7 m × 1.5 m × 3.0 m (12.1 ft × 4.9 ft × 9.8 ft)

Start of mission
- Launch date: April 14, 1969, 07:54:03 UTC
- Rocket: Thorad-SLV2G Agena-D
- Launch site: Vandenberg SLC-2E

End of mission
- Last contact: January 22, 1972
- Decay date: January 22, 1972

Orbital parameters
- Reference system: Geocentric
- Regime: Low Earth
- Eccentricity: 0.00401
- Perigee altitude: 1,075 kilometers (668 mi)
- Apogee altitude: 1,135 kilometers (705 mi)
- Inclination: 99.91°
- Period: 107.4 minutes
- Epoch: April 14, 1969

Nimbus 3 (also called Nimbus-B2) was a meteorological satellite. It was the third in a series of the Nimbus program.

== Launch ==
Nimbus 3 was launched on April 14, 1969, by a Thor-Agena rocket from Vandenberg Air Force Base, Lompoc, CA.

The spacecraft functioned nominally until January 22, 1972. The satellite orbited the Earth once every 1 hour and 47 minutes, at an inclination of 99.9°. Its perigee was 1,075 kilometers (668 mi) and its apogee was 1,135 kilometers (705 mi).

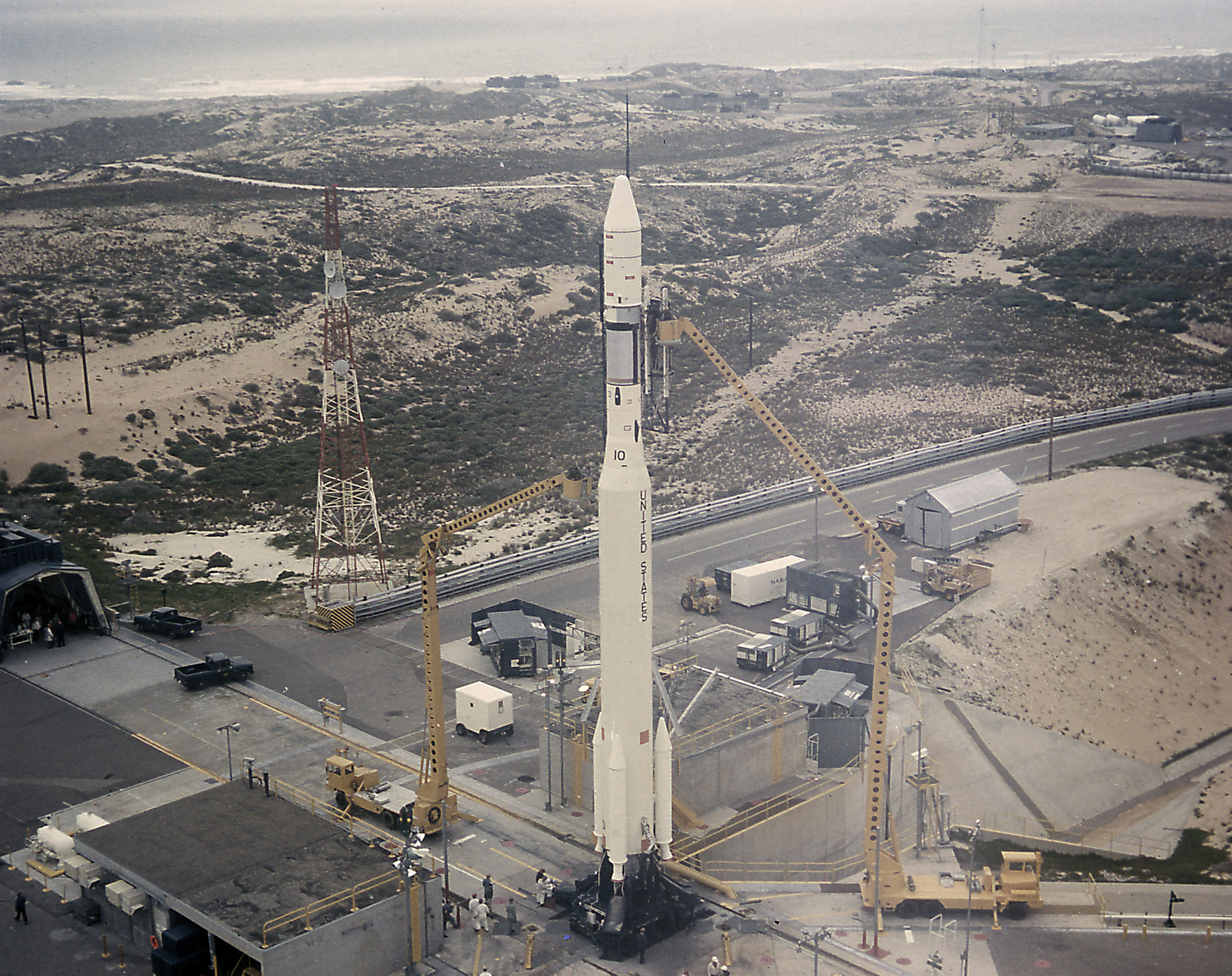
Thorad-Agena rocket with Nimbus 3 on pad

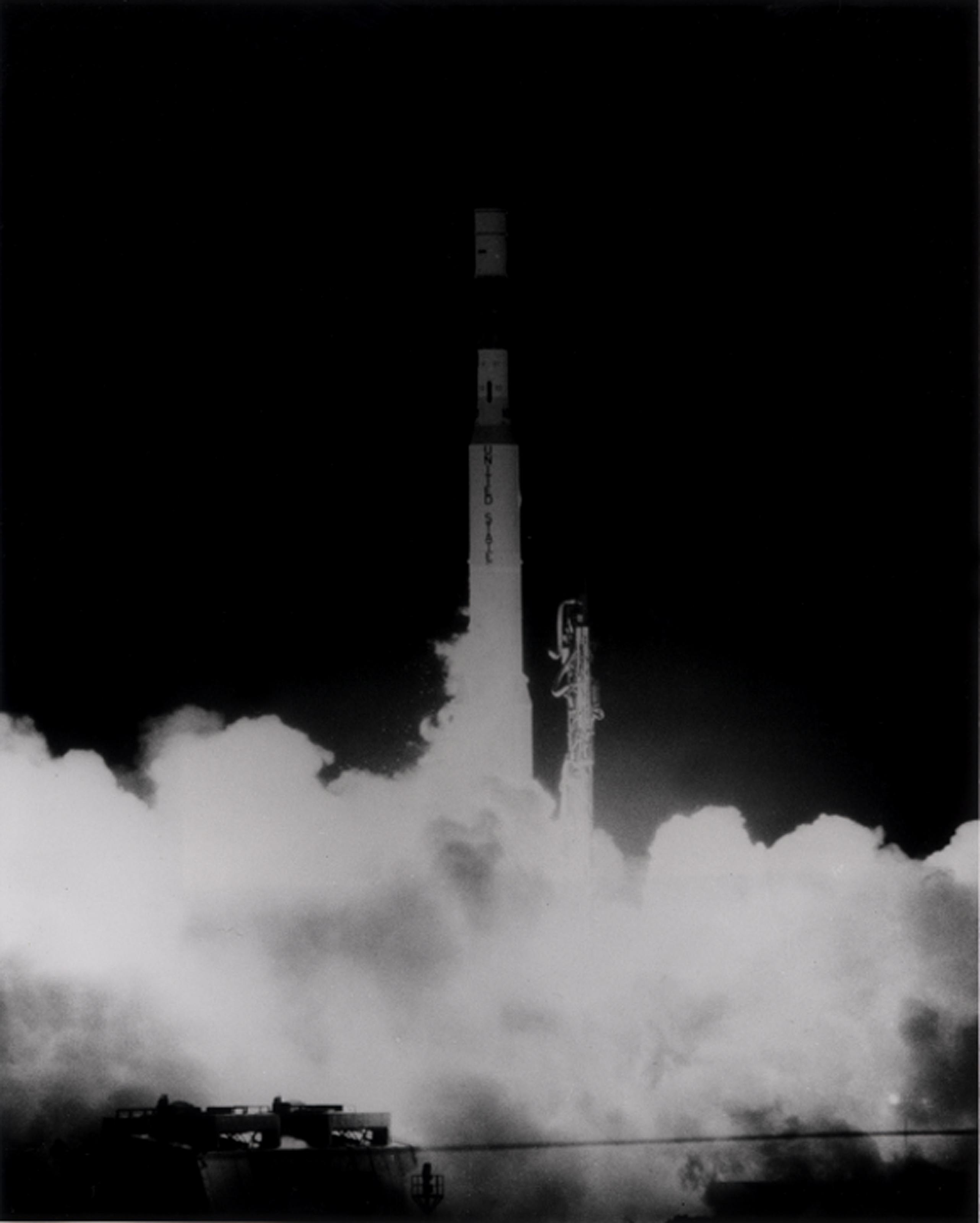
Launch of Nimbus 3

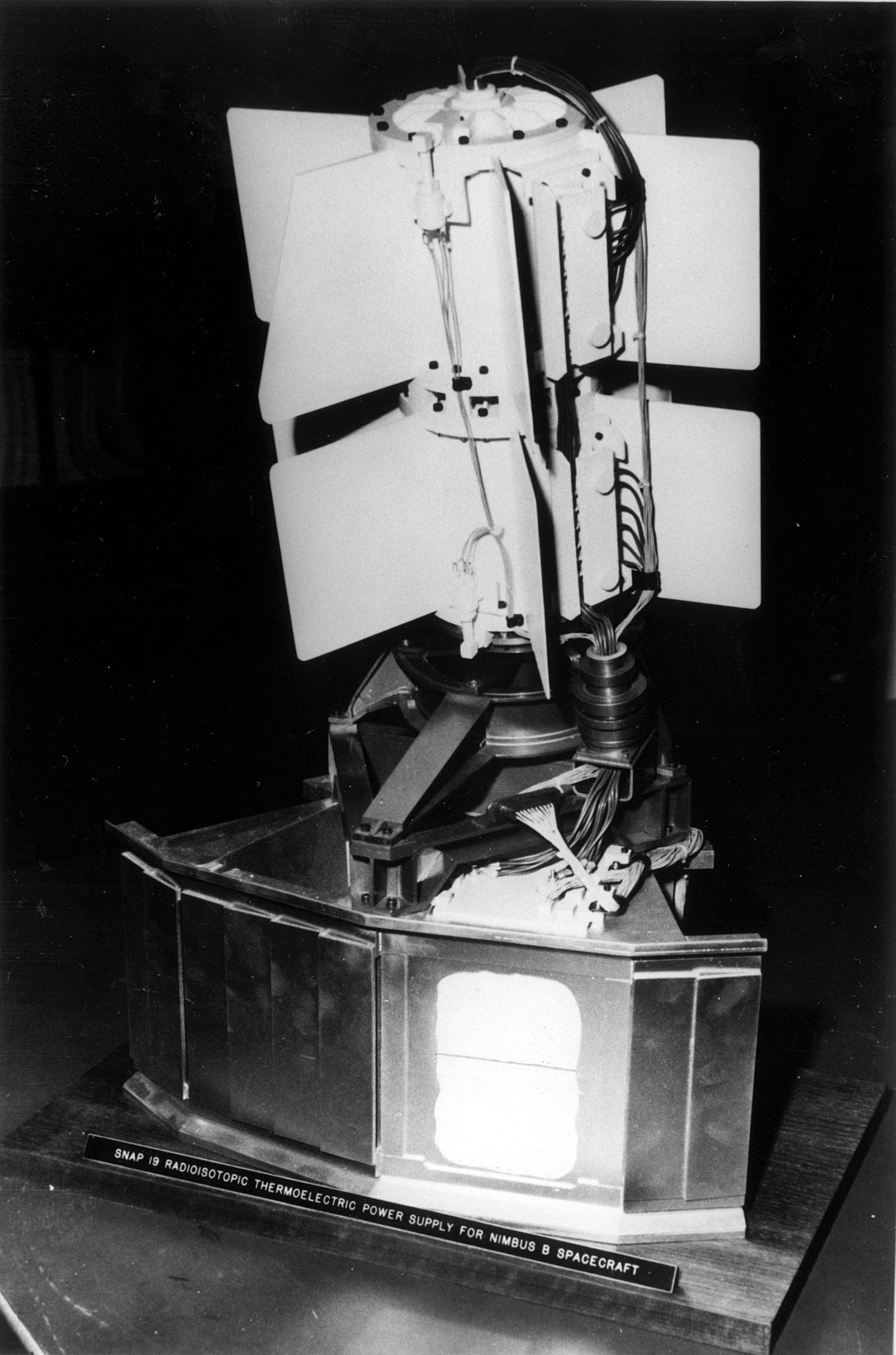
Model of SNAP-19 (radioisotope thermoelectric generator)

== Mission ==
The third in a series of second-generation meteorological research and development satellites, Nimbus 3 was designed to serve as a stabilized, Earth-oriented platform for the testing of advanced meteorological sensor systems and the collecting of meteorological data. The polar-orbiting spacecraft consisted of three major elements: (1) a sensory ring, (2) solar paddles, and (3) the control system housing. The solar paddles and the control system housing were connected to the sensory ring by a truss structure, giving the satellite the appearance of an ocean buoy.

Nimbus 3 was nearly 3.7 metres (12 ft) tall, 1.5 metres (4.9 ft) in diameter at the base, and about 3 metres (9.8 ft) across with solar paddles extended. The torus-shaped sensory ring, which formed the satellite base, housed the electronics equipment and battery modules. The lower surface of the torus ring provided mounting space for sensors and telemetry antennas. An H-frame structure mounted within the center of the torus provided support for the larger experiments and tape recorders. Mounted on the control system housing, which was located on top of the spacecraft, were Sun sensors, horizon scanners, gas nozzles for attitude control, and a command antenna.

Use of the attitude control subsystem (ACS) permitted the spacecraft's orientation to be controlled to within plus or minus 1 degree for all three axes (pitch, roll, yaw). Primary experiments consisted of: (1) a satellite infrared spectrometer (SIRS), for determining the vertical temperature profiles of the atmosphere; (2) an infrared interferometer spectrometer (IRIS), for measuring the emission spectra of the Earth-atmosphere system; (3) both high- and medium-resolution infrared radiometers (HRIR/MRIR), for yielding information on the distribution and intensity of infrared radiation emitted and reflected by the Earth and its atmosphere; (4) a monitor of ultraviolet solar energy (MUSE), for detecting solar UV radiation; (5) an image dissector camera system (IDCS), for providing daytime cloud-cover pictures in both real-time mode, using the real time transmission system (RTTS), and tape recorder mode, using the high data rate storage system; (6) a radioisotope thermoelectric generator (RTG), SNAP-19, to assess the operational capability of radioisotope power for space applications; and (7) an interrogation, recording and location system (IRLS) experiment, designed to locate, interrogate, record, and retransmit meteorological and geophysical data from remote collection stations.

Nimbus 3 was successful and performed normally until July 22, 1969, when the IRIS experiment failed. The HRIR and SIRS experiments were terminated on January 25, 1970, and June 21, 1970, respectively. The remaining experiments continued to operate until September 25, 1970, when the rear horizon scanner failed. Without this horizon scanner, it was impossible to maintain proper spacecraft attitude, thus making most experimental observations useless. All spacecraft operations were terminated on January 22, 1972.
