= Hitchhiker 1 =

US Air Force satellite

- Mission type: Technology
- Operator: U.S. Air Force
- COSPAR ID: 1963-025B
- SATCAT no.: 614

Spacecraft properties
- Bus: P-11
- Manufacturer: Lockheed Martin / MIT
- Launch mass: 80 kilograms (180 lb)

Start of mission
- Launch date: June 27, 1963, 19:55 UTC
- Rocket: Thor-SLV2A Agena-D
- Launch site: Vandenberg 75-1-2

Orbital parameters
- Reference system: Geocentric
- Regime: Medium Earth
- Eccentricity: 0.16898
- Perigee altitude: 330 kilometres (210 mi)
- Apogee altitude: 3,060 kilometres (1,900 mi)
- Inclination: 82.1°
- Period: 120.3 minutes
- Epoch: June 27, 1963

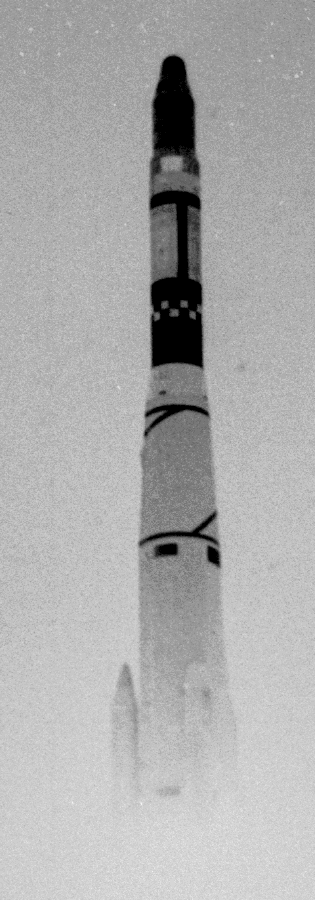
Launch of Hitchhiker 1.

Hitchhiker 1 (or Hitchhiker P-11 4201) was a satellite launched by U.S. Air Force on June 27, 1963. It was launched with the aim of studying and measuring cosmic radiation. The satellite was the first successful satellite of the P-11 program, following the failure of the first Hitchhiker satellite in March 1963.

== Instruments ==
- 1 Geiger tube (40-4 MeV)
- 1 Faraday cup plasma
- 1 Electron detector (0.3-5.0 MeV)
- 1 Proton detector (0.7-5.3 MeV)
- 2 electrostatic analysers (4-100 keV)

== See also ==
- Corona program
