= Explorer 31 =

NASA satellite of the Explorer program

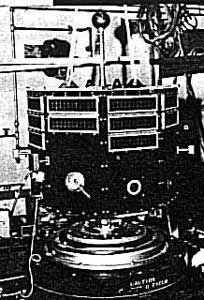
- Explorer 31 satellite
- Names: DME-A; Direct Measurement Explorer-A
- Mission type: Earth science
- Operator: NASA
- COSPAR ID: 1965-098B
- SATCAT no.: 01806

Spacecraft properties
- Spacecraft: Explorer XXXI
- Spacecraft type: Direct Measurement Explorer
- Bus: DME
- Launch mass: 98.9 kg (218 lb)

Start of mission
- Launch date: 29 November 1965, 04:48:47 GMT
- Rocket: Thor SLV-2 Agena B (Thor 453 / Agena 6102 (TA5))
- Launch site: Vandenberg, SLC-2E
- Contractor: Douglas Aircraft Company / Lockheed Corporation
- Entered service: 29 November 1965

Orbital parameters
- Reference system: Geocentric orbit
- Regime: Low Earth orbit
- Perigee altitude: 505 km (314 mi)
- Apogee altitude: 2,978 km (1,850 mi)
- Inclination: 79.80°
- Period: 121.40 minutes

Instruments
- Cylindrical Electrostatic Probes; Electron Temperature; Energetic Electron Current Monitor; Ion Mass Spectrometer; Magnetic Ion-Mass Spectrometer; Thermal Electron Probe; Thermal Ion Probe

Explorer 31, also called DME-A, was a NASA satellite launched as part of the Explorer program. Explorer 31 was launched on 29 November 1965 from Vandenberg Air Force Base, California, with a Thor-Agena launch vehicle. Explorer 31 was released along with the Canadian satellite Alouette 2.

Explorer 31 was a small ionospheric observatory instrumented to make direct measurements of selected ionospheric parameters at the spacecraft. Since the spacecraft had no tape recorder, data could be observed at the spacecraft only when the spacecraft was in sight of the telemetry station and when commanded on. Experiments were operated either simultaneously or sequentially, as desired. The satellite was spin-stabilized with the spin axis perpendicular to the orbit plane. The spin rate and spin axis were controlled by an onboard magnetic torquing system. The attitude and spin rate information were observed by a Sun sensor and a three-axis magnetometer.

Satellite performance was satisfactory except for a partial power failure in May 1966, which reduced data acquisition time to about half the nominal amount. Some difficulties were encountered in obtaining attitude information that was necessary for the reduction of the experiment observations. On July 1, 1969, the satellite data observations were terminated with five of the seven experiments operating. Responsibility for standby monitoring of the satellite was given to the ESSA telemetry station at Boulder, Colorado, on July 8, 1969. During this standby operation, experiment data were collected only once on 1 October 1969, for 9 minutes from the electrostatic probe for use in studying a red arc event. On January 15, 1971, no response was received from a variety of satellite commands, and the satellite was abandoned.

== Instruments ==
- Cylindrical Electrostatic Probes
- Electron Temperature
- Energetic Electron Current Monitor
- Ion Mass Spectrometer
- Magnetic Ion-Mass Spectrometer
- Thermal Electron Probe
- Thermal Ion Probe

== Experiments ==
=== Cylindrical Electrostatic Probes ===
The cylindrical electrostatic probes were used to measure electron temperature and density in the ionosphere. Each sensor was basically a Langmuir probe consisting of a collector electrode extending from the central axis of a cylindrical guard ring. The guard rings extended 23 cm (9.1 in) from the spacecraft and the collector electrode extended 46 cm (18 in). The two sensors were mounted on opposite sides of the spacecraft, and were perpendicular to the spin axis and in the orbit plane.

=== Electron Temperature ===
The purpose of the electron temperature probe was to measure the energy distribution of ionospheric electrons. From these measurements electron temperature and density could be derived. The sensor was a disk, 2 cm (0.79 in) in diameter, mounted flush with the satellite surface. The probe current-voltage characteristics were investigated by means of the same modulation technique that was used in the spherical ion-mass spectrometer.

=== Energetic Electron Current Monitor ===
The purpose of this experiment was to measure the electron energy spectrum in the suprathermal energy range of 0.2 to 2000 eV. Two three-grid retarding potential analyzers were used, one providing analog data in the 0.2 to 200 eV range and the other providing digital data in the 0.2 to 2000 eV range. The two analyzers had separate power supplies and associated electronics. The instrumentation for the digital measurement included an electron multiplier and a digital pulse counting system. Because of moisture contamination of the detector in the launch tower prior to launch, the gain of the electron multiplier was so degraded that no geophysical measurements could be obtained. The instrumentation for the analog measurement included a range-changing electrometer. The analog data were plots of the measured current-voltage function. The analog experiment yielded excellent data for 4 months, after which the experiment deteriorated because of radiation damage to its circuitry.

=== Ion Mass Spectrometer ===
The spherical ion mass spectrometer probe was used to investigate the composition of positive ions at altitudes between 500 km (310 mi) and 3,000 km (1,900 mi). The instrument consisted of a 9 cm (3.5 in) diameter ion collector, circumscribed by a 10 cm (3.9 in) diameter nickel grid that was approximately 40% transparent. The grid had a 6-volts bias to prevent electrons from reaching the collector. The probe rested on top of a 32 cm (13 in)-long rod mounted along the satellite spin axis. In addition to the principal bias-potential sweep, two small ac potentials were applied to the collector. The amplitude and depth of modulation of the resulting carrier current were then measured as a function of probe potential. This "retarding potential" ion spectrometer had low resolution. Hydrogen, with a mass-to-charge ratio (M/Q) of 1, was readily distinguished from atomic oxygen ions (M/Q = 16). However, atomic nitrogen ions (M/Q = 14) could not be distinguished from atomic oxygen ions. The signal current to the probe varied inversely with ionic mass, and consequently, the instrument was less sensitive to heavy masses. When the concentration of atomic oxygen ions was significantly greater than 300 ions per cc, accurate temperature measurements could be made for the atomic oxygen ions.

=== Magnetic Ion-Mass Spectrometer ===
A magnetic sector field mass spectrometer was used to measure the abundances of the ionospheric positive ion species in the mass range 1 to 20 atomic mass units. The mass range was swept every 3-seconds by an exponentially decreasing accelerating voltage, which varied from -4000 to -150 volts. The ions were separated according to mass-to-charge ratio in the magnetic analyzer section of the spectrometer. A particular ion species, depending on the accelerating voltage, was then passed through the analyzer into an electron multiplier. The output ion current from the multiplier was measured by a logarithmic electrometer amplifier and converted to a voltage. The experiment operated normally and yielded useful data from launch on 29 November 1965, until about April 1967. Then low battery voltage resulted in a voltage regulator problem. The experiment provided useful data only intermittently after that, and it failed in March 1968.

=== Thermal Electron Probe ===
The purpose of the thermal electron probe experiment was to measure the electron density and temperature at the satellite. The instrumentation was a modified Langmuir probe in which unwanted ion and photo-current components were eliminated through the use of a grid with appropriate bias. The grid was mounted flush with the satellite surface and it received a sweep voltage of from -5 to +4 V. The collector was biased at +25 V. From the measured current-voltage data the electron density could be obtained with an accuracy of about 20%. The electron temperature could normally be obtained with an accuracy of about 150K, but a computer curve-fitting analysis improved the accuracy to about 10K.

=== Thermal Ion Probe ===
The purpose of the thermal ion probe experiment was to measure ion density, temperature, and composition at the satellite. The sensor consisted of a planar ion trap with three circular mesh grids and a collector. With the innermost suppressor grid maintained at -15 V to exclude electrons and the middle retarding grid swept from zero to 6.3 V, the resulting current-voltage curve due to ion current was interpreted to obtain ion temperature, ion composition, and density. Determination of these parameters was made by curve fitting, assuming various models of ion parameters and assuming that the model with the least rms residual was correct.

== See also ==
- Explorer program
