= Alouette 2 =

Defunct Canadian research satellite

Alouette 2 (Alouette B)
- Launch of the Thor SLV-2 Agena B rocket with Alouette 2 and DME A spacecraft.
- Mission type: Ionospheric research
- Operator: DRDC
- COSPAR ID: 1965-098A
- SATCAT no.: 1804
- Mission duration: Final: 9 years and 8 months

Spacecraft properties
- Manufacturer: RCA Victor
- Launch mass: 146.5 kilograms (323 lb)

Start of mission
- Launch date: 29 November 1965, 04:48 UTC
- Rocket: Thor SLV-2 Agena-B
- Launch site: Vandenberg LC-75-1-1

End of mission
- Deactivated: 1 August 1975

Orbital parameters
- Reference system: Geocentric
- Regime: Medium Earth
- Perigee altitude: 508 kilometres (316 mi)
- Apogee altitude: 2,652 kilometres (1,648 mi)
- Inclination: 79.8 degrees
- Period: 117.61 minutes
- Epoch: 5 December 2013, 13:24:44 UTC

Alouette 2 was a Canadian research satellite launched at 04:48 UTC on November 29, 1965, by a Thor Agena rocket with Explorer 31 (also known as DME A) from the Western test range at Vandenberg AFB in California. It was (like its predecessor Alouette 1 and rideshare spacecraft Explorer 31) designed to explore Earth's ionosphere.

== History ==
The name "Alouette" came from the French for "skylark" and from the title of a popular French-Canadian folk song. Alouette 2 was built up from the identical backup satellite for Alouette 1. It had many more experiments and a more sophisticated support system than the earlier satellite. It lasted for 10 years, being terminated on August 1, 1975.

RCA Victor of Montreal, Quebec, was the prime contractor; Havilland Aircraft of Toronto, Ontario, served as associate contractor.

== Post mission ==
After the Alouette 2 was launched, the upper stage of the rocket used to launch the satellite became a derelict object that would continue to orbit Earth for many years. As of 2026, the upper stage remains in orbit.

Alouette 2 itself became a derelict object in August 1975 after its termination. It too remains in earth orbit along with Explorer 31 as of 2026.

== Name misconception ==
Alouette 2 has occasionally been misidentified as ISIS-X; however, ISIS-X is the designation for the combined mission that launched both Alouette 2 and Explorer 31 together in November 1965. Alouette 2 was the first spacecraft in the ISIS-X series and originally designated as ISIS-X until it was designated Alouette 2.
