= Thorad-Agena =

American two-stage rocket (1966–1972)

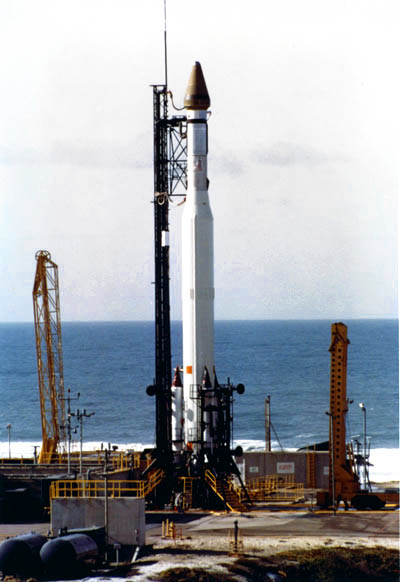
- The last Thorad Agena SLV-2G with four Poppy spacecraft
- Manufacturer: Douglas
- Country of origin: United States

Size
- Height: SLV-2G: 32.9 m (107.9 ft); SLV-2H: 34 m (111 ft)
- Diameter: 2.44 m (8 ft)
- Mass: SLV-2G: 91,400 kg (201,500 lb); SLV-2H: 88,731 kg (195,618 lb)
- Stages: 2

Launch history
- Status: Retired
- Launch sites: Vandenberg AFB, SLC-1, SLC-2E, SLC-3W
- Total launches: 43 (30 SLV-2G, 13 SLV-2H)
- Success(es): 40 (28 SLV-2G, 12 SLV-2H)
- Failure(s): 2 (1 SLV-2G, 1 SLV-2H)
- Partial failure: 1 (SLV-2G)
- First flight: SLV-2G: 9 August 1966; SLV-2H: 5 June 1969
- Last flight: SLV-2G: 14 December 1971; SLV-2H:25 May 1972

Thorad-Agena was an American expendable launch system, derived from the Thor and Delta rockets.

The first stage of the rocket was a stretched Thor variant named "Long Tank Thrust Augmented Thor". The Long Tank Thor first stage was later adopted by NASA's Delta program for its "Thrust Augmented Improved Delta", which first flew in 1968. The second stage was the Agena-D, which had already been used in conjunction with the standard configuration Thor, as the Thor-Agena. Three Castor rockets would be used as boosters.

Most launches carried Corona (KeyHole) reconnaissance satellites, particularly spacecraft of the KH-4 series, however some scientific and technology development satellites were also flown, mostly towards the end of the program.

== Configurations ==
The Thorad-Agena was flown in two different configurations, the SLV-2G, and the SLV-2H. These differed in that the SLV-2G used Castor 1 strap-on boosters, whereas the 2H used Castor 2s.

== Launches ==
Forty-three launches took place from 1966 to 1972 with two complete failures and one partial.

The launch of a KH-4A photo reconnaissance satellite on May 9, 1967, malfunctioned when the Thor's first stage failed to cut off on schedule and continued burning until LOX depletion, thus putting the satellite into an incorrect orbit that seriously reduced its image quality.

The first total failure was the launch of a Nimbus weather satellite on May 5, 1968, when control of the Thor failed during launch and it was destroyed by Range Safety action at T+120 seconds. The satellite carried a pair of isotopic power generators known as SNAP (Systems For Nuclear Auxiliary Power). As the possibility of a launch failure had been considered during their design, the power generators were equipped with a robust casing to prevent their radioactive contents from escaping into the environment. After the destruction of Nimbus-B's launch vehicle, Navy crews began an extensive search for the SNAP generators. On September 27, the Nimbus satellite was located in 300 feet of water near the Santa Barbara Islands with the SNAP units nearby. They were successfully fished out of the ocean two weeks later and their protective casings found to be intact. The fuel inside them was removed and reused in a subsequent Nimbus launch.

As part of the investigation, parts of the Thor were recovered and examined. It was discovered that the yaw gyro was installed improperly and had missing alignment pins, apparently because a pad technician had mistakenly broken them off during installation. Without the pins, the gyro rotated out of position with the effect that the booster lost control almost as soon as the pitch and roll sequence started.

The other total failure was the attempted launch of a KH-4B photo-reconnaissance satellite on February 17, 1971. A technician mistakenly added too much lubricant to the Thor's fuel system, the result being that the excess fluid formed a frozen plug in a section of plumbing. The booster lifted and flew normally until the start of the pitch and roll program about 20 seconds after liftoff at which point the turbopump gearbox disintegrated due to loss of lubricant. Flying debris tore up the Thor's thrust section, causing total loss of thrust. With the main engine being the only source of attitude control, the launch vehicle tumbled uncontrollably and exploded 30 seconds after launch, the debris impacting in Bear Creek Canyon a quarter mile from the launch complex.

== Gallery ==
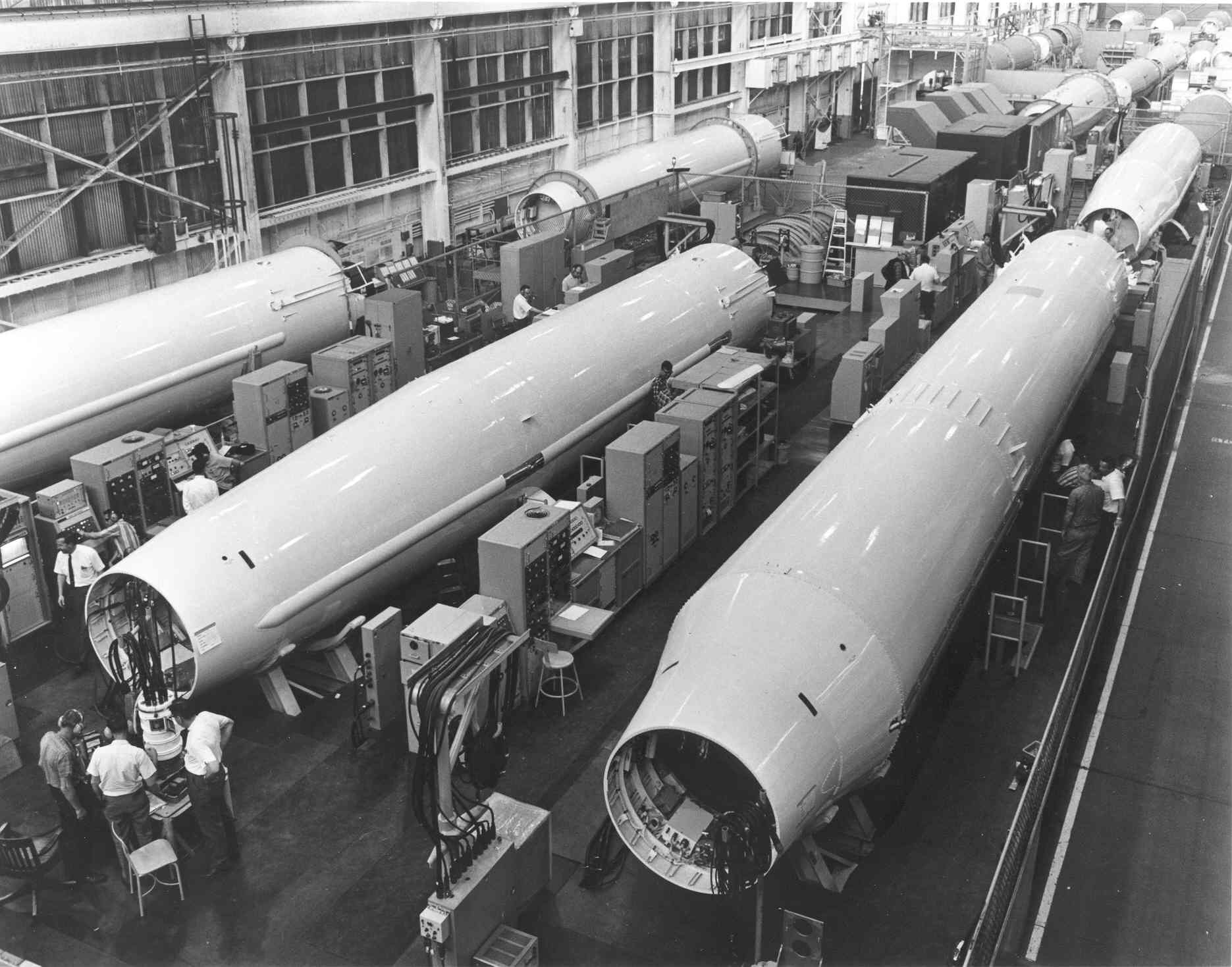
A Long Tank Thor (right) next to the regular Thor (left)

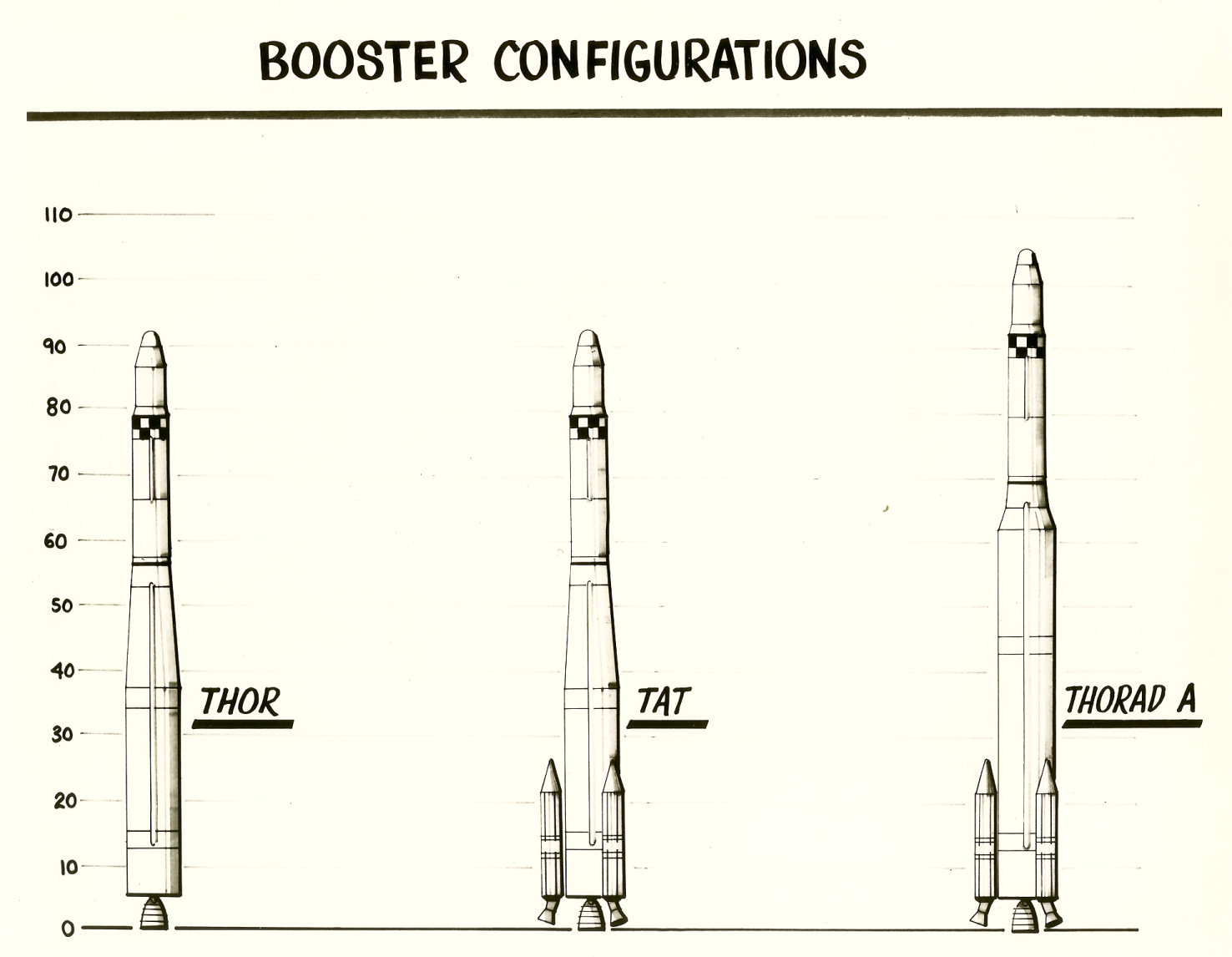
Thor booster configurations with Thorad-Agena at the right.

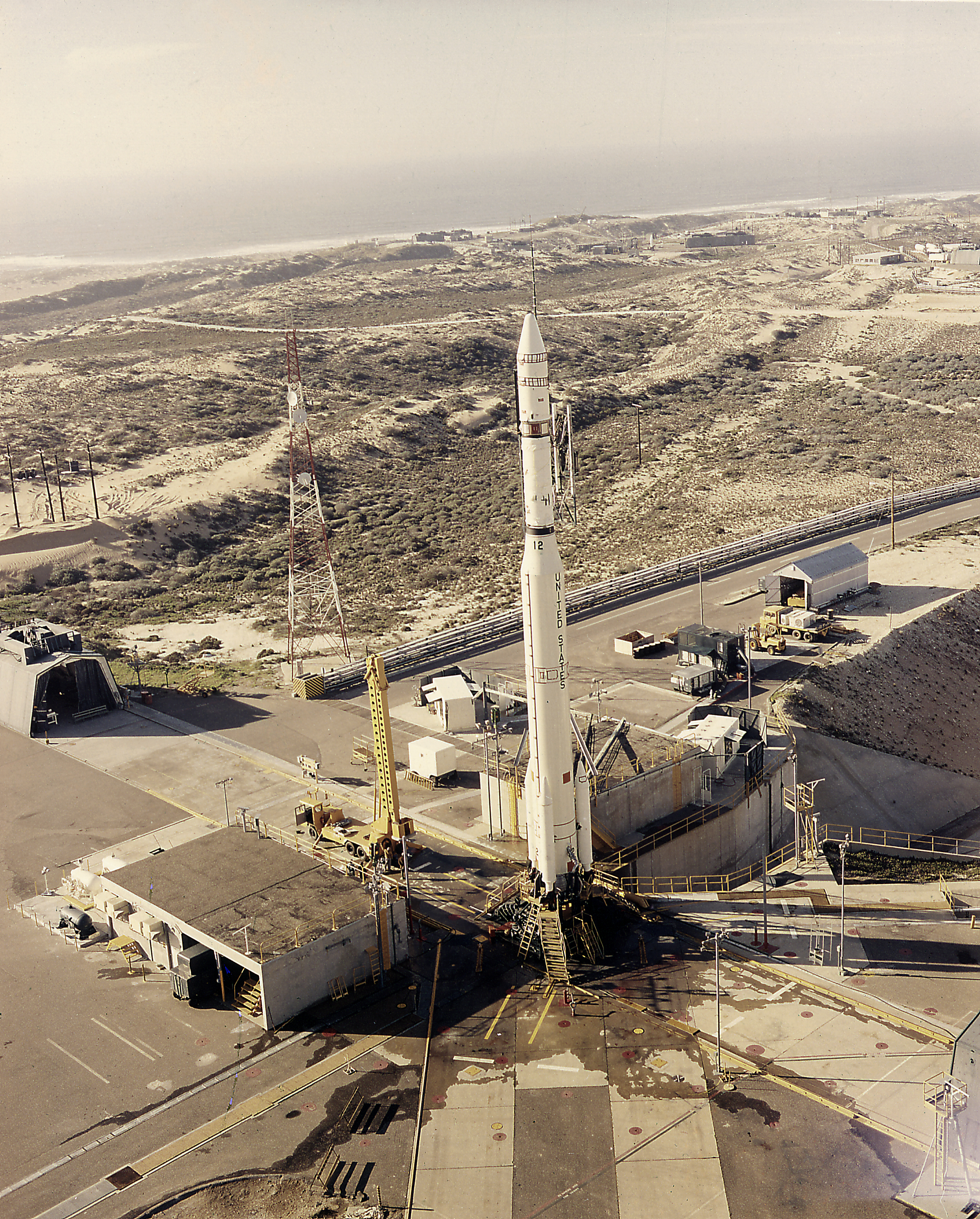
Thorad-Agena with SERT-2 at the Western Test Range in California (February 1970)

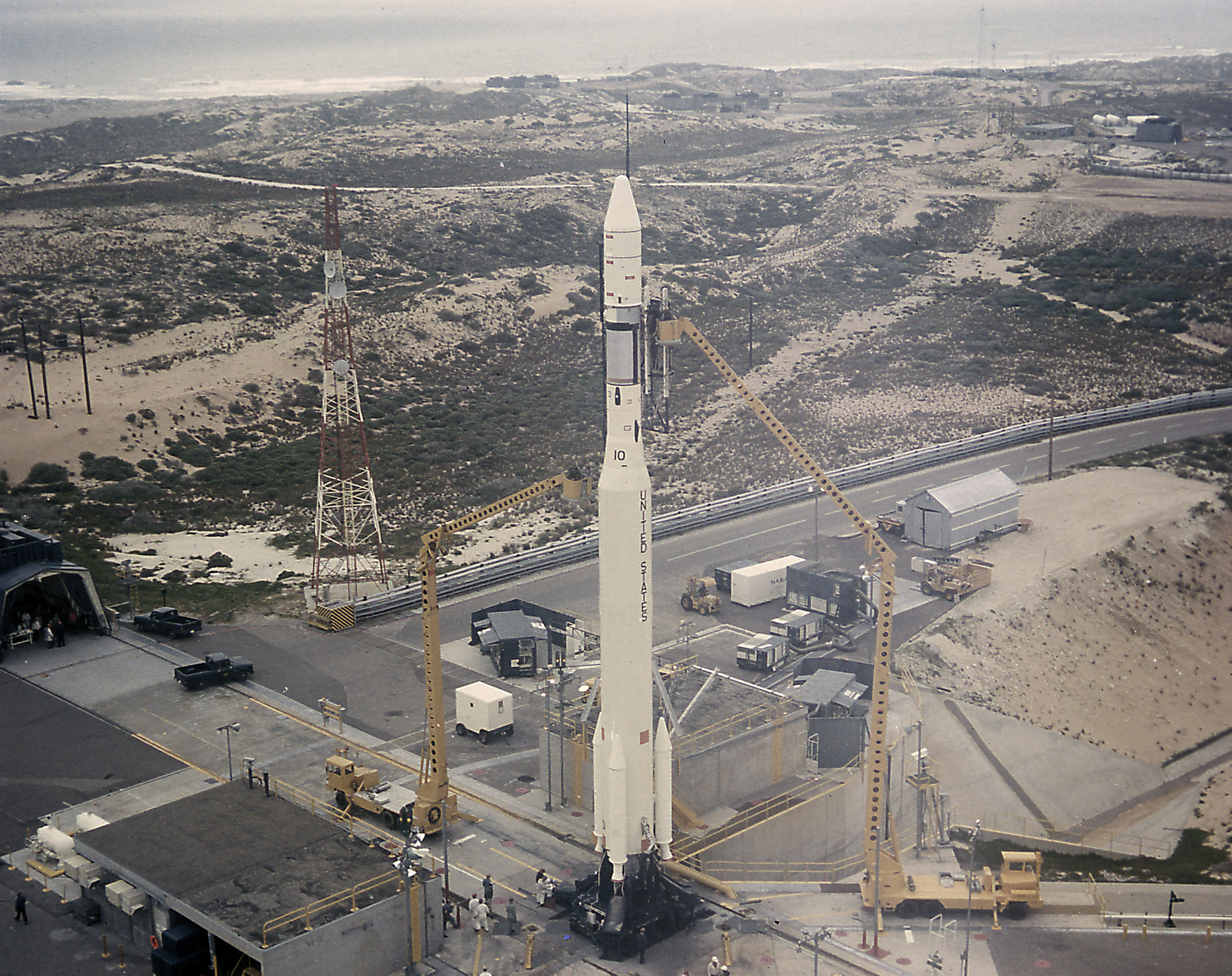
Thorad-Agena-10 with Nimbus 3 (April 1969)

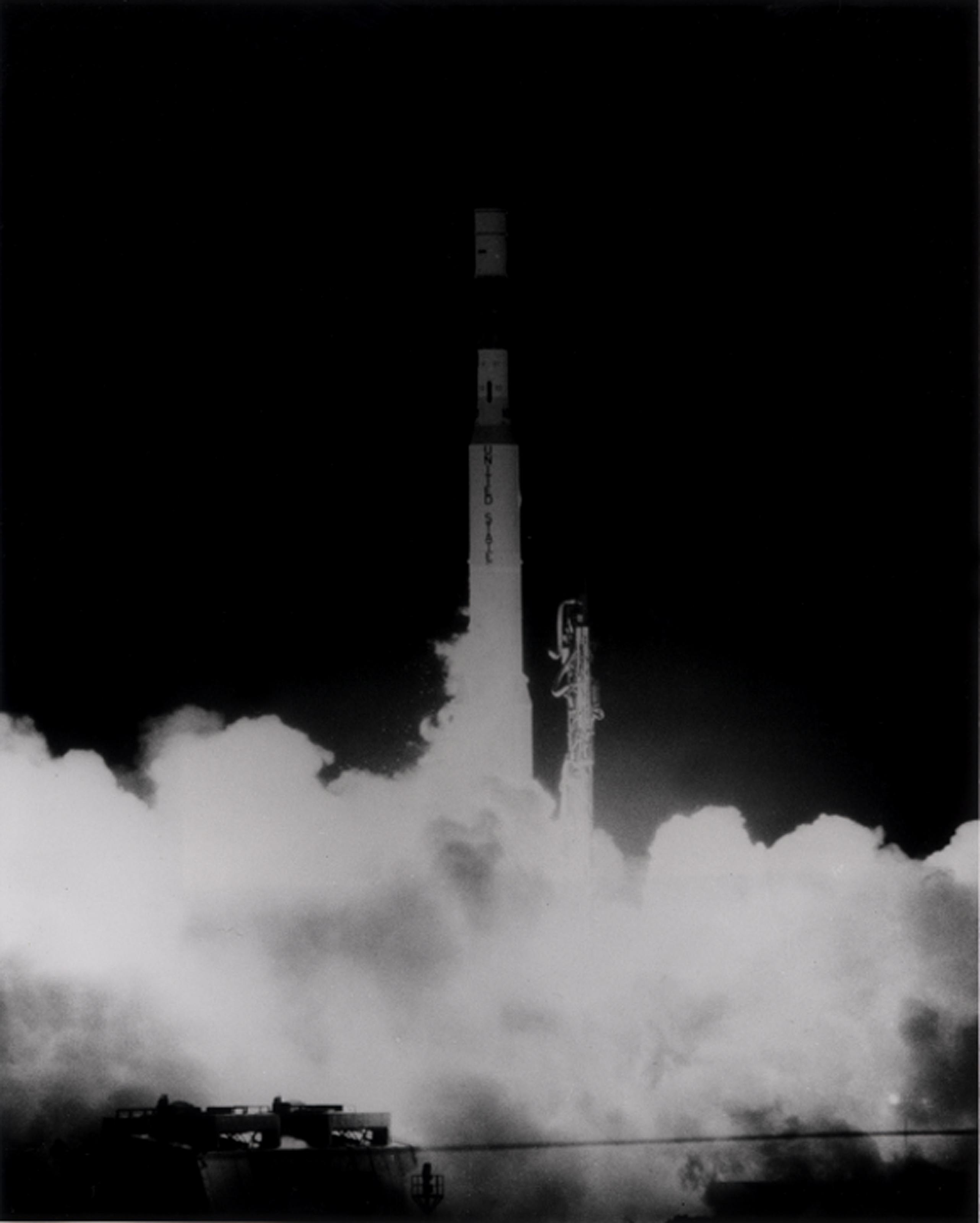
Thorad-Agena-10 with Nimbus 3 (April 1969)

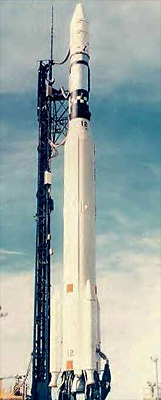
Thorad-SLV2H Agena-D with OGO 6 (July 1969)
