= List of Thor-Ablestar launches =

The Thor-Ablestar, or Thor-Able-Star, also known as Thor-Epsilon was an early American expendable launch system consisting of a PGM-17 Thor missile, with an Ablestar upper stage. It was a member of the Thor family of rockets, and was derived from the Thor-Able.

Two versions were built; the Thor-Ablestar 1 (Thor-DM21 Able-Star), with a DM-21 Thor and an AJ-10-104 second stage engine, and the Thor-Ablestar 2 (Thor-DSV2A Able-Star), which had a DSV-2A Thor first stage, and an uprated AJ-10-104D engine on the second stage. Thor-Ablestar 1 launches occurred from LC-17 at Cape Canaveral, and Thor-Ablestar 2 rockets were launched from LC-75-1 at Vandenberg Space Force Base (now designated SLC-2).

Nineteen Thor-Ablestar were launched between 1960 and 1965, of which four failed, and a fifth resulted in a partial failure, as only one of two payloads separated from the upper stage.

== Launch history ==
Date/Time (UTC)	S/N	Version	Launch site	Payload	Function	Outcome	Photo
1960-04-13 12:02:36	Thor 257 Ablestar 002	Thor-DM21 Able-Star	CCAFS LC-17B	Transit 1B	Navigation	Success, maiden flight of Thor-Ablestar	
1960-06-22 05:54	Thor 281 Ablestar 003	Thor-DM21 Able-Star	CCAFS LC-17B	Transit 2A, GRAB-1 (Solrad 1)	Navigation, ELINT	Success	
1960-08-18 19:58	Thor 262 Ablestar 004	Thor-DM21 Able-Star	CCAFS LC-17B	Courier 1A	Communications	Failure (Premature first stage cutoff. RSO T+150 seconds.)	
1960-10-04 17:50	Thor 293 Ablestar 005	Thor-DM21 Able-Star	CCAFS LC-17B	Courier 1B	Communications	Success	
1960-11-30 19:50	Thor 283 Ablestar 006	Thor-DM21 Able-Star	CCAFS LC-17B	Transit 3A, GRAB-2 (Solrad-2)	Navigation, ELINT	Failure (Premature Thor cutoff. RSO. Debris fell in Cuba.)	
1961-02-22 03:45	Thor 313 Ablestar 007	Thor-DM21 Able-Star	CCAFS LC-17B	Transit 3B, LOFTI-1	Navigation, Technology	Success	
1961-06-29 04:22	Thor 315 Ablestar 008	Thor-DM21 Able-Star	CCAFS LC-17B	Transit 4A, Injun 1, GRAB-3 (Solrad 3)	Navigation, Ionospheric, ELINT	Success	
1961-11-15 22:26	Thor 305 Ablestar 009	Thor-DM21 Able-Star	CCAFS LC-17B	Transit 4B, TRAAC	Navigation	Success, Transit Research and Attitude Control	
1962-01-24 09:30	Thor 311 Ablestar 010	Thor-DM21 Able-Star	CCAFS LC-17B	LOFTI-2, SECOR, GRAB-4 (Solrad 4), Injun 2, SURCAL 1	Technology, Geodesy, ELINT, Ionospheric, Calibration	Failure (second stage insufficient thrust)	
1962-05-10 12:06	Thor 314 Ablestar 011	Thor-DM21 Able-Star	CCAFS LC-17B	ANNA 1A	Geodesy	Failure (second stage failed to ignite)	
1962-10-31 08:08	Thor 319 Ablestar 012	Thor-DM21 Able-Star	CCAFS LC-17A	ANNA 1B	Geodesy	Success, final flight of Thor DM-21 Ablestar	
1963-09-28	Thor 375	Thor-DSV2A Able-Star	VAFB LC-75-1-1	Transit 5BN-1 / Transit 5E-1	Navigation	Success	
1963-05-12	Thor 385	Thor-DSV2A Able-Star	VAFB LC-75-1-1	Transit 5BN-2 / Transit 5E-3	Navigation	Success	
1964-04-21 18:50	Thor 379 Ablestar 014	Thor-DSV2A Able-Star	VAFB LC-75-1-1	Transit 5BN-3, Transit 5E-4	Navigation	Failure	
1964-10-06 17:04:21	Thor 423 Ablestar 016	Thor-DSV2A Able-Star	VAFB LC-75-1-2	OPS 5796 (Transit O-1), Dragsphere 1, Dragsphere 2	Navigation	Success	
1964-12-13 00:08:10	Thor 427 Ablestar 017	Thor-DSV2A Able-Star	VAFB LC-75-1-2	OPS 6582 (Transit O-2) (Transit 5B-5), Transit 5E-5	Navigation	Success	
1965-03-11 13:39	Thor 440 Ablestar 018	Thor-DSV2A Able-Star	VAFB LC-75-1-1	OPS 7087 (Transit O-3), SECOR 2	Navigation, Geodesy	Success	
1965-06-24 22:35	Thor 447 Ablestar 019	Thor-DSV2A Able-Star	VAFB LC-75-1-1	OPS 8480 (Transit O-4)	Navigation	Success	
1965-08-13 22:11	Thor 455 Ablestar 020	Thor-DSV2A Able-Star	VAFB LC-75-1-1	OPS 8464 (Transit O-5), Dodecapole 2, Tempsat 1, Surcal 5, Long Rod 1, Calsphere 2	Navigation, Calibration	Success, final flight of Thor-Ablestar	

== See also ==
- List of Delta 4 launches
- List of Thor and Delta launches
- List of Thor and Delta launches (1960–1969)
- List of Delta IV Heavy launches
- List of Delta IV Medium launches
- Thor-Delta
