= Thor DSV-2 =

- Function: Sounding rocket Test vehicle ASAT booster
- Country of origin: United States

Launch history
- Launch sites: CCAFS LC-17; Johnston Atoll LE-1 & LE-2; VA LC-75
- Total launches: 34
- Success(es): 28
- Failure: 6

The Thor DSV-2 was a series of sounding rockets, test vehicles, and anti-satellite weapons derived from the Thor Intermediate-range ballistic missile. It was also used as the first stage of several Thor-derived expendable launch systems.

== Variants ==
=== Thor DSV-2A ===
The DSV-2A was a two-stage rocket, consisting of a DSV-2A / MB-3-II first stage, and an Able-Star / AJ10-104D second stage. It was launched eight times between 1963 and 1965 from Vandenberg.

List of Thor DSV-2A launches
S/N	Date	Launch site	Payload	Result	Image
Thor 375	1963-09-28	VA LC-75	Transit 5BN-1 / Transit 5E-1	Success	
Thor 385	1963-12-05	VA LC-75	Transit 5BN-2 / Transit 5E-3	Success	
Thor 379	1964-04-21	VA LC-75	Transit 5BN-3 / Transit 5E-2	Failure	
Thor 423	1964-10-06	VA LC-75	Transit-O 1/ Dragsphere 1 / Dragsphere 2		
Thor 427	1964-12-13	VA LC-75	Transit-O 2 / Transit 5E-5		
Thor 440	1965-03-11	VA LC-75	Transit-O 3 / SECOR 2	Partial success	
Thor 447	1965-06-24	VA LC-75	Transit-O 4		
Thor 455	1965-08-13	VA LC-75	Transit-O 5 / Dodecapole 2 / Long Rod / Tempsat 1 / Surcal 5 / Calsphere 2		

=== Thor DSV-2D ===
The DSV-2D was launched twice in 1962, conducting suborbital research flights for the development of the Program 437 ASAT. It was a single-stage vehicle, consisting of a Thor DM-21. Launches were conducted from Cape Canaveral Air Force Station Launch Complex 17A.

List of Thor DSV-2D launches
S/N	Date	Launch site	Payload	Orbit	Image
Thor 337	1962-01-15	CCAFS LC-17A	Big Shot 1 (AVT 1)	Suborbital	
Thor 338	1962-07-18	CCAFS LC-17A	Big Shot 2 (AVT 2)	Suborbital	

=== Thor DSV-2E ===
The DSV-2E was a single-stage vehicle, using a Thor DM-19. It was launched eight times in 1962, including several nuclear weapons tests as part of Operation Fishbowl. Four launches failed, all of which were carrying live nuclear warheads. Launches were conducted from Launch Emplacements 1 and 2 on Johnston Atoll.

List of Thor DSV-2E launches
S/N	Date	Launch site	Payload	Orbit	Result
Thor 177	1962-05-02	Johnston LE-1	Tigerfish (R/D)	Suborbital	Success
Thor 199	1962-06-04	Johnston LE-1	Bluegill	Suborbital	Radar contact lost 5 minutes after launch. RSO destruct command sent.
Thor 193	1962-06-20	Johnston LE-1	Starfish	Suborbital	RVs caused turbine exhaust gas to enter the thrust section, overheating and weakening the engine mounts. Engine broke loose and ruptured the propellant tanks T+59 seconds. Warhead destroyed by RSO T+65 seconds.
Thor 195	1962-07-09	Johnston LE-1	Starfish Prime	Suborbital	Success
Thor 180	1962-07-26	Johnston LE-1	Bluegill Prime	Suborbital	Stuck LOX valve caused loss of thrust and fire on the launch stand. Range Safety Officer destroyed the missile and warhead. Launch area extensively contaminated with plutonium.
Thor 156	1962-10-16	Johnston LE-2	Bluegill Double Prime	Suborbital	Flight control failure T+85 seconds. RSO T+156 seconds.
Thor 141	1962-10-26	Johnston LE-1	Bluegill Triple Prime	Suborbital	Success
Thor 226	1962-11-01	Johnston LE-2	Kingfish	Suborbital	Success

=== Thor DSV-2F ===
The DSV-2F was a single-stage vehicle consisting of a Thor DM-19, like the DSV-2E. Three were launched between 1963 and 1964, as part of Project ASSET, which involved launching a sub-scale mockup of the X-20 Dyna-Soar to test materials for the larger spacecraft. Launches were conducted from Cape Canaveral Air Force Station Launch Complex 17B.

List of Thor DSV-2F launches
S/N	Date	Launch site	Payload	Orbit	Result	Image
Thor 232	1963-09-18	CCAFS LC-17B	ASSET-1 (ASSET ASV 1)	Suborbital	Success	
Thor 260	1964-10-28	CCAFS LC-17B	ASSET-4 (ASSET-AEV 1)	Suborbital	Success	
Thor 247	1964-12-09	CCAFS LC-17B	ASSET-5 (ASSET-AEV 2)	Suborbital	Success	

=== Thor DSV-2G ===
The DSV-2G was a two-stage rocket, consisting of a Thor DM-19 first stage, and a Delta second stage. Three were launched between 1964 and 1965 as part of Project ASSET. Launches were conducted from Cape Canaveral Air Force Station Launch Complex 17B.

List of Thor DSV-2G launches
S/N	Date	Launch site	Payload	Orbit	Result	Image
Thor 240	1964-03-24	CCAFS LC-17B	ASSET-2 (ASSET-ASV 2)	Suborbital	Atmospheric flight, second stage fired intermittently, destroyed by range safety	
Thor 250	1964-07-22	CCAFS LC-17B	ASSET-3 (ASSET-ASV 3)	Suborbital	Success	
Thor 248	1965-02-23	CCAFS LC-17B	ASSET-6 (ASSET-ASV 4)	Suborbital	Success	

=== Thor DSV-2J ===
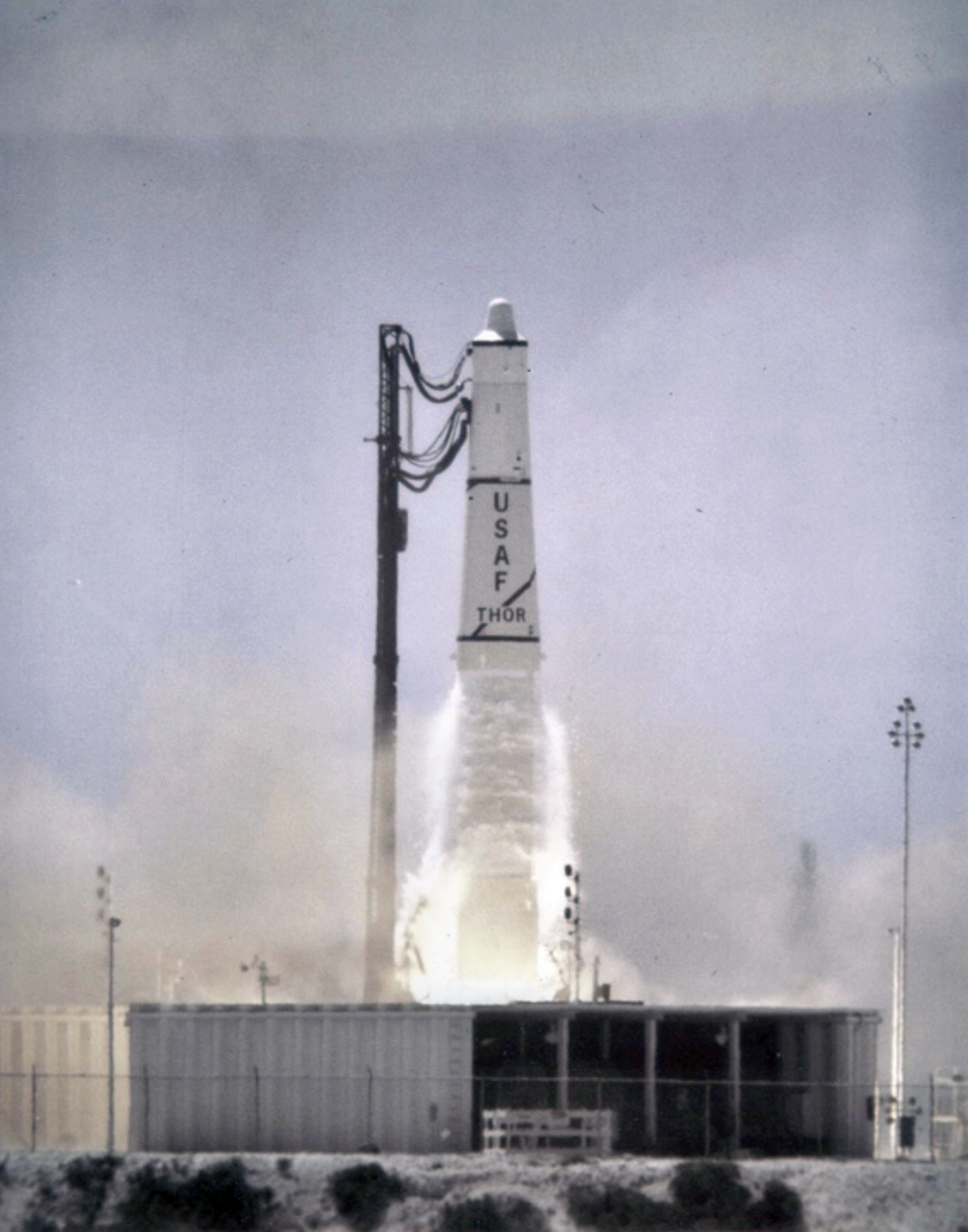
Thor-DSV2J, Johnston Atoll, 1960s

The DSV-2J was an operational nuclear anti-satellite weapon. 18 were launched between 1964 and 1975. Most flights were non-intercept tests of the rocket's anti-satellite capabilities, however some later launches carried research payloads. Launches were conducted from Launch Emplacements 1 and 2 on Johnston Atoll.

List of Thor DSV-2J launches
S/N	Date	Launch site	Payload	Result
Thor 299	14.02.1964	Johnston LE-1	AFP-437 (#1)	Success
Thor 209	02.03.1964	Johnston LE-1	AFP-437 (#2)	Success
Thor 290	21.04.1964	Johnston LE-2	AFP-437 (#3)	Success
Thor 227	28.05.1964	Johnston LE-2	AFP-437 (#4)	Failure
Thor 236	16.11.1964	Johnston LE-1	AFP-437 (#5)	Success
Thor 155	05.04.1965	Johnston LE-2	AFP-437 (#6)	Success
Thor 188	07.12.1965	Johnston LE-2	AFP-437AP (#1)	Success
Thor 242	18.01.1966	Johnston LE-2	AFP-437AP (#2)	Success
Thor 196	12.03.1966	Johnston LE-2	AFP-437AP (#3)	Success
Thor 289	02.07.1966	Johnston LE-2	AFP-437AP (#4)	Success
Thor 168	31.03.1967	Johnston LE-1	AFP-437 (#7)	Success
Thor 205	14.05.1968	Johnston LE-1	AFP-437 (#8)	Success
Thor 252	20.11.1968	Johnston LE-1	AFP-437 (#9)	Success
Thor 152	27.03.1970	Johnston LE-1	AFP-437 (#10)	Success
Thor 225	24.04.1970	Johnston LE-2	SDP	Partial Success
Thor 271	24.09.1970	Johnston LE-2	HAP/SXRE	Success
Thor 201	19.09.1975	Johnston LE-2	BMDTTP 1 (DG-5)	Success
Thor 274	06.11.1975	Johnston LE-2	BMDTTP 2 (DG-3)	Success
