= ASSET (spacecraft) =

Experimental American space project

ASSET (Aerothermodynamic Elastic Structural Systems Environmental Tests)
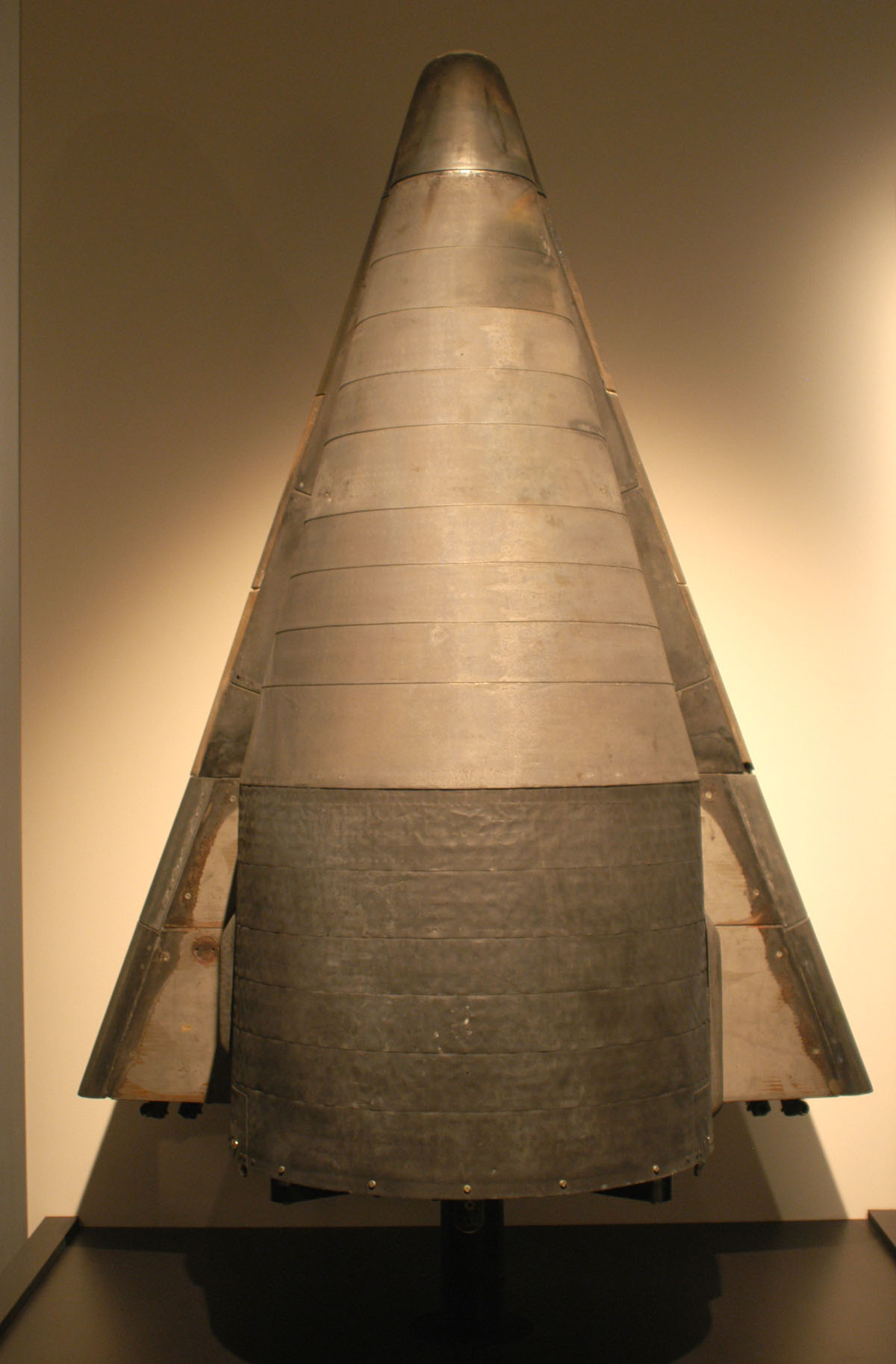
- Preserved ASSET 3 vehicle at USAF Museum, Dayton, Ohio
- Function: experimental US space project involving the testing of an uncrewed sub-scale reentry vehicle.
- Manufacturer: McDonnell Aircraft
- Country of origin: United States

Size
- Height: 5 ft 9 in (1.75 m)
- Width: 4 ft 7 in (1.40 m)
- Mass: 1,190 lb (540 kg)

Launch history
- Status: Retired
- Launch sites: Cape Canaveral Air Force Station Space Launch Complex 17
- Total launches: 6
- Success(es): 1
- Partial failure: 5 (vehicles not recovered though flights were successful)
- First flight: 18 September 1963
- Last flight: 23 February 1965

ASSET, or Aerothermodynamic Elastic Structural Systems Environmental Tests was an experimental US space project involving the testing of an uncrewed sub-scale reentry vehicle.

== Development and testing ==
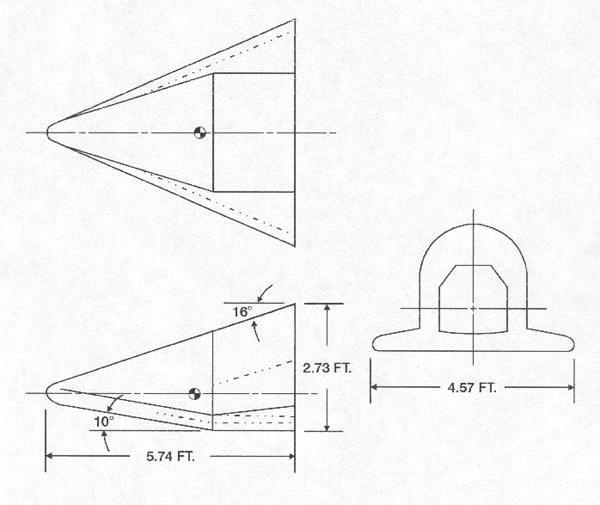
ASSET diagram

Begun in 1960, ASSET was originally designed to verify the superalloy heat shield of the X-20 Dyna-Soar prior to full-scale crewed flights. The vehicle's biconic shape and low delta wing were intended to represent Dyna-Soar's forward nose section, where the aerodynamic heating would be the most intense; in excess of an estimated 2200 °C (4000 °F) at the nose cap.

Following the X-20 Dyna-Soar programs' cancellation in December 1963, completed ASSET vehicles were used in reentry heating and structural investigations with hopes that data gathered would be useful for the development of future space vehicles, such as the Space Shuttle.

Based on the results of the ASSET program, McDonnell proposed Winged Gemini, a Gemini spacecraft version capable of landing on a runway.

== Flights ==
Built by McDonnell, each vehicle was launched on a suborbital trajectory from Cape Canaveral's Pad 17B at speeds of up to 6000 m/s before making a water landing in the South Atlantic near Ascension Island.

Originally, a Scout launch vehicle had been planned for the tests, but this was changed after a large surplus of Thor and Thor-Delta missiles (returned from deployment in the United Kingdom) became available.

Of the six vehicles built, only one was successfully recovered and is currently on display at the National Museum of the United States Air Force in Dayton, Ohio.

Mission	Vehicle	Launch vehicle	Launch date	Apogee	Max. speed	Result	Disposition
ASSET 1	ASSET-ASV 1	Thor-DSV2F (Thor 232)	September 18, 1963	62 km	4,906 m/s	Survived reentry; flotation equipment malfunctioned, preventing planned recovery.	Sunk in Atlantic.
ASSET 2	ASSET-ASV 2	Thor-DSV2G (Thor 240)	March 24, 1964	55 km		Launch vehicle upper stage malfunction; vehicle self-destruct mechanism activated post-separation. Mission failed.	Destroyed.
ASSET 3	ASSET-ASV 3	Thor-DSV2G (Thor 250)	July 22, 1964	71 km	5,500 m/s	Survived reentry; all mission goals met.	Recovered 12 hours after launch. Preserved.
ASSET 4	ASSET-AEV 1	Thor-DSV2F (Thor 260)	October 28, 1964	50 km	4,000 m/s	Survived reentry; all mission goals met; recovery not planned.	Sunk in Atlantic.
ASSET 5	ASSET-AEV 2	Thor-DSV2F (Thor 247)	December 9, 1964	53 km	4,000 m/s	Survived reentry; all mission goals met; recovery not planned.	Sunk in Atlantic.
ASSET 6	ASSET-ASV 4	Thor-DSV2G (Thor 248)	February 23, 1965	70 km	6,000 m/s	Survived reentry; flotation equipment malfunctioned, preventing planned recovery.	Sunk in Atlantic.

== Specifications ==
- Manoeuvring controls: Hydrogen-peroxide reaction control thrusters
- Maximum Mach no.: M25
- Downrange: 27,000 mi (23,462 nmi; 43,452 km)
- Apogee: 50 mi (43 nmi; 80 km)
- Hypersonic L/D ratio: 1:1

== See also ==
- Molniya BOR-4
- Martin X-23 PRIME
