= Transit 5E-1 =

Artificial satellite of the United States Department of Defense

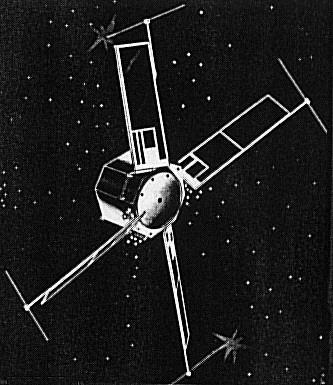
- Transit 5E-1
- Mission type: Charged particle research Magnetospheric; Solar research Geodesy
- Operator: US Air Force
- COSPAR ID: 1963-038C
- SATCAT no.: 00671
- Mission duration: 11 years

Spacecraft properties
- Launch mass: 59 kilograms (130 lb)
- Dimensions: 0.46 m x 0.25 m

Start of mission
- Launch date: 28 September 1963, 20:22 UTC
- Rocket: Thor DSV-2A Ablestar
- Launch site: Vandenberg LC-75-1-1

Orbital parameters
- Reference system: Geocentric
- Semi-major axis: 7,470.7 kilometers (4,642.1 mi)
- Perigee altitude: 1,070.9 kilometers (665.4 mi)
- Apogee altitude: 1,128.5 kilometers (701.2 mi)
- Inclination: 90.1 degrees
- Period: 107.1 minutes

Transit 5E-1, International Designator 1963-038C, is an artificial satellite of the United States Department of Defense and launched on September 28, 1963, aboard a Thor rocket from the Vandenberg Air Force Base.

== Launch ==
Transit 5E-1 was launched to study charged particles, magnetic fields and solar spectra, as well as for geodetic research.

It was launched to a polar orbit, from where it did geomagnetic and geodetic measurements. Electrical power was produced by four solar panels. After August 1969, the satellite did measurements infrequently. The last data were transmitted in November, 1974.

== See also ==
- 1963 in spaceflight
