= Transit Research and Attitude Control =

Satellite

Transit Research and Attitude Control (TRAAC)
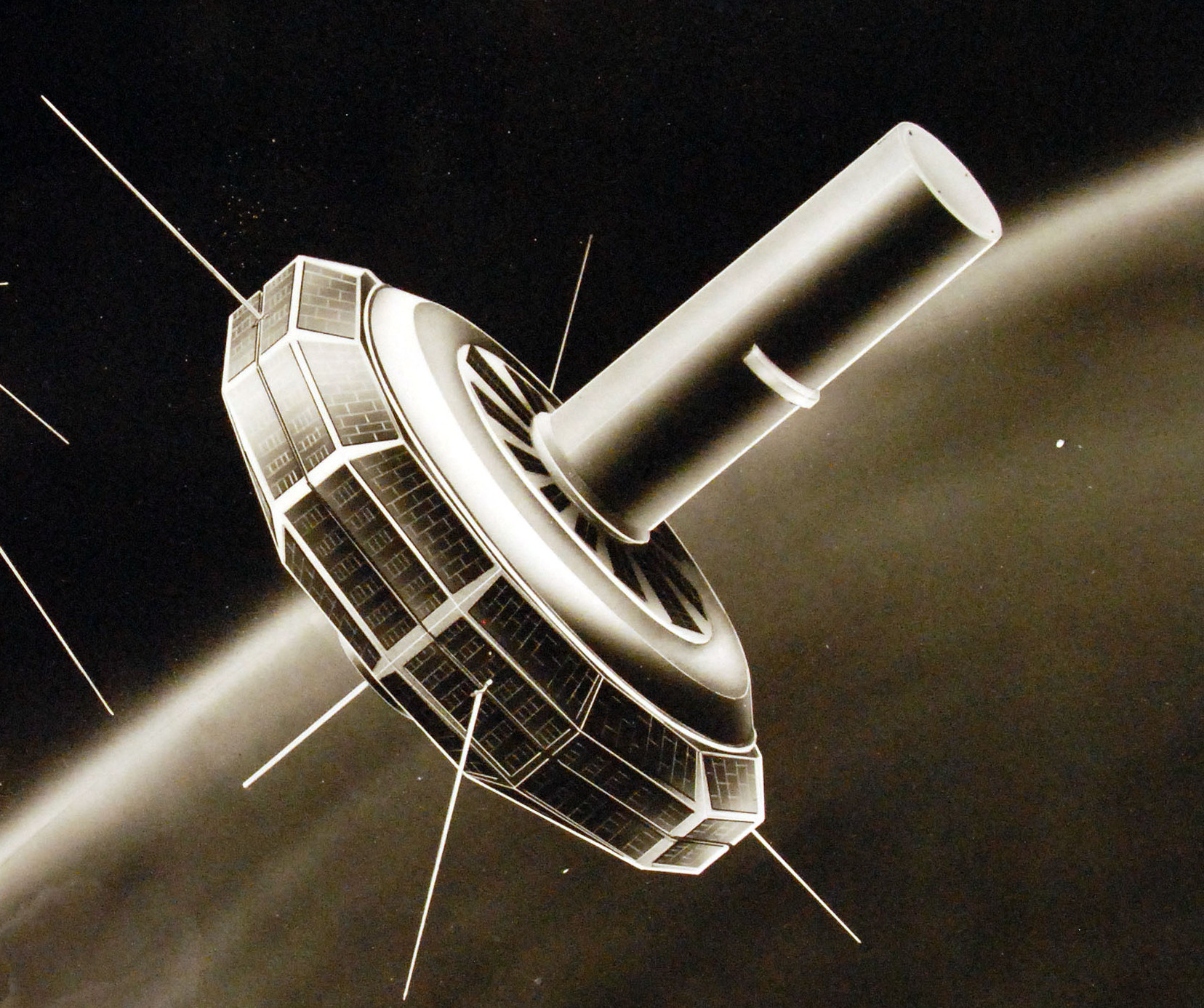
- Artist's impression of TRAAC in orbit
- Mission type: Technology
- Operator: United States Navy
- Harvard designation: 1961 Alpha Eta 2
- COSPAR ID: 1961-031B
- SATCAT no.: 205
- Mission duration: 270 days

Spacecraft properties
- Launch mass: 109 kilograms (240 lb)

Start of mission
- Launch date: November 15, 1961, 22:26 UTC
- Rocket: Thor DM-21 Ablestar
- Launch site: Cape Canaveral LC-17B

End of mission
- Last contact: August 12, 1962

Orbital parameters
- Reference system: Geocentric
- Regime: Low Earth
- Semi-major axis: 7,405.20 kilometers (4,601.38 mi)
- Eccentricity: 0.0102037
- Perigee altitude: 958 kilometers (595 mi)
- Apogee altitude: 1,109 kilometers (689 mi)
- Inclination: 32.44 degrees
- Period: 105.8 minutes
- Epoch: February 7, 2014, 04:46:58 UTC

The Transit Research and Attitude Control (TRAAC) satellite was launched by the U. S. Navy from Cape Canaveral along with Transit 4B on November 15, 1961.

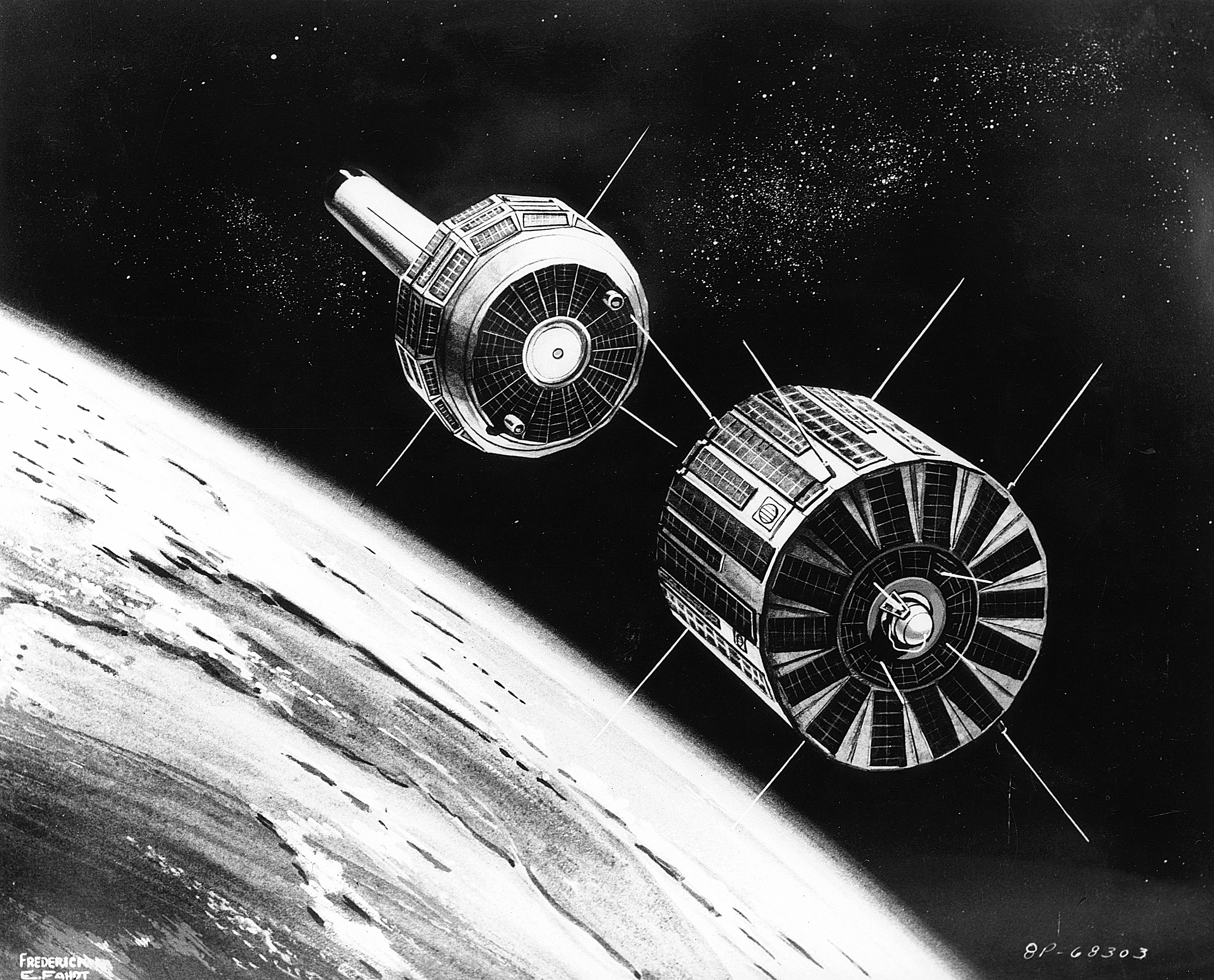
Drawing of Transit 4B and TRAAC satellite in orbit.

== Mission ==
The 109 kg satellite was used to test the feasibility of using gravity-gradient stabilization in Transit navigational satellites. It provided information on the effects of radiation from nuclear explosions in space, as it was one of several satellites whose detectors provided data for the Starfish Prime test; ultimately its solar cells were damaged by the radiation and it ceased operation. It was among several satellites which were inadvertently damaged or destroyed by the Starfish Prime high-altitude nuclear test on July 9, 1962, and subsequent radiation belt. It is expected to orbit for 800 years at an altitude of about 950 kilometers (590 mi).

== Poem ==
The first poem to be launched into orbit about the Earth was inscribed on the instrument panel of TRAAC. Entitled Space Prober and written by Prof. Thomas G. Bergin of Yale University, it reads in part:

And now 'tis man who dares assault the sky...
And as we come to claim our promised place, aim only to repay the good you gave,
And warm with human love the chill of space.
