= Thor-Ablestar =

American expendable launch system

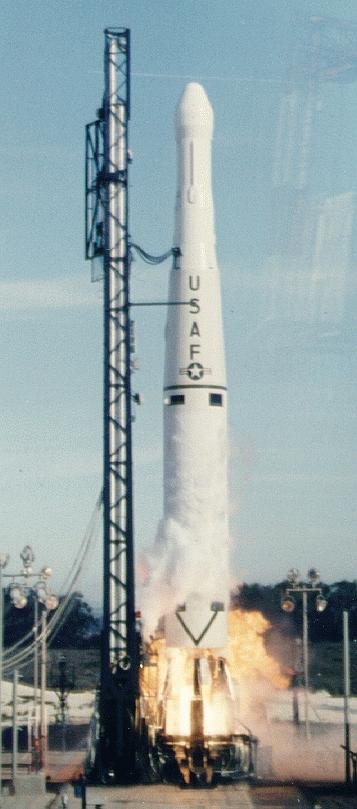
- The launch of a Thor-Ablestar 2 with a Transit satellite.
- Function: Orbital carrier rocket
- Manufacturer: Douglas / Aerojet
- Country of origin: United States

Size
- Height: 29 metres (95 ft)
- Diameter: 2.44 metres (8 ft 0 in)
- Mass: 53,000 kilograms (117,000 lb)
- Stages: 2

Capacity

Payload to 1100km LEO
- Mass: 150 kilograms (330 lb)

Associated rockets
- Family: Thor
- Comparable: Delta

Launch history
- Launch sites: LC-17, Canaveral; LC-75-1, Arguello
- Total launches: 19
- Success(es): 12
- Failure: 5
- Partial failure: 2
- First flight: 13 April 1960
- Last flight: 13 August 1965

First stage – Thor
- Powered by: 1 MB-3-1
- Maximum thrust: 760.64 kilonewtons (171,000 lbf)
- Specific impulse: 285 sec
- Burn time: 164 seconds
- Propellant: RP-1/LOX

Second stage – Ablestar
- Powered by: 1 AJ10-104, AJ10-104D
- Maximum thrust: 36.02 kilonewtons (8,100 lbf)
- Specific impulse: 280 sec
- Burn time: 296 seconds
- Propellant: HNO_{3}/UDMH

The Thor-Ablestar, or Thor-Able-Star, also known as Thor-Epsilon was an early American expendable launch system consisting of a PGM-17 Thor missile, with an Ablestar upper stage. It was a member of the Thor family of rockets, and was derived from the Thor-Able.

The improved Able-Star version was used as the upper stage of the Thor-Ablestar two stage launcher. The Able-Star second stage was an enlarged version of the Able rocket stage using AJ10-104 or AJ10-104D engines, which gave the Thor-Ablestar a greater payload capacity compared to the earlier Thor-Able. It also incorporated restart capabilities, allowing a multiple-burn trajectory to be flown, further increasing payload, or allowing the rocket to reach different orbits. It was the first rocket to be developed with such a capability and development of the stage took a mere eight months.

Two versions were built; the Thor-Ablestar 1, with a DM-21 Thor and an AJ-10-104 second stage engine, and the Thor-Ablestar 2, which had a DSV-2A Thor first stage, and an uprated AJ-10-104D engine on the second stage. Thor-Ablestar 1 launches occurred from LC-17 at Cape Canaveral, and Thor-Ablestar 2 rockets were launched from LC-75-1 at Vandenberg Space Force Base (now designated SLC-2).

== Launches ==
Nineteen Thor-Ablestar were launched between 1960 and 1965, of which four failed, and a fifth resulted in a partial failure, as only one of two payloads separated from the upper stage.

The first failure was the launch of Courier 1A, an experimental communications satellite, on 19 August 1960 when the first stage shut down 30 seconds earlier than planned and was destroyed by the Range Safety Officer.

On 30 November, another launch involving a Transit satellite failed in practically identical fashion. This episode nearly created an international incident as parts of the Thor landed in Cuba. War was threatened. Cuban leader Fidel Castro subsequently sold off the Thor's engine to the Soviets and the Chinese received its thrust vectors, which ended up proving valuable to the latter's development of a ballistic missile capability. To prevent this from happening again, future Thor Ablestar launches had their flight paths modified to avoid passing over Cuba.

The launch of a Transit satellite on 22 February 1961 was successful, but its companion Lofti satellite failed to separate from the second stage.

On 29 June 1961, a Thor-Ablestar successfully inserted a Transit-4A into orbit, but two hours later the Ablestar exploded for unknown reasons into hundreds of pieces, which remained in orbit. This is the first known artificial object to break up unintentionally in space.

The third launch failure occurred on 24 January 1962 when the second stage produced insufficient thrust to achieve orbital velocity for several piggybacked satellites. The fourth and final failure was the launch of an Anna geodetic satellite on 10 May 1962 when the second stage completely failed to ignite.

Date/Time (UTC)	S/N	Version	Launch site	Payload	Function	Outcome	Photo
1960-04-13 12:02:36	Thor 257 Ablestar 002	Thor-DM21 Able-Star	CCAFS LC-17B	Transit 1B	Navigation	Success, maiden flight of Thor-Ablestar	
1960-06-22 05:54	Thor 281 Ablestar 003	Thor-DM21 Able-Star	CCAFS LC-17B	Transit 2A, GRAB-1 (Solrad 1)	Navigation, ELINT	Success	
1960-08-18 19:58	Thor 262 Ablestar 004	Thor-DM21 Able-Star	CCAFS LC-17B	Courier 1A	Communications	Failure (Premature first stage cutoff. RSO T+150 seconds.)	
1960-10-04 17:50	Thor 293 Ablestar 005	Thor-DM21 Able-Star	CCAFS LC-17B	Courier 1B	Communications	Success	
1960-11-30 19:50	Thor 283 Ablestar 006	Thor-DM21 Able-Star	CCAFS LC-17B	Transit 3A, GRAB-2 (Solrad-2)	Navigation, ELINT	Failure (Premature Thor cutoff. RSO. Debris fell in Cuba.)	
1961-02-22 03:45	Thor 313 Ablestar 007	Thor-DM21 Able-Star	CCAFS LC-17B	Transit 3B, LOFTI-1	Navigation, Technology	Success	
1961-06-29 04:22	Thor 315 Ablestar 008	Thor-DM21 Able-Star	CCAFS LC-17B	Transit 4A, Injun 1, GRAB-3 (Solrad 3)	Navigation, Ionospheric, ELINT	Success	
1961-11-15 22:26	Thor 305 Ablestar 009	Thor-DM21 Able-Star	CCAFS LC-17B	Transit 4B, TRAAC	Navigation	Success, Transit Research and Attitude Control	
1962-01-24 09:30	Thor 311 Ablestar 010	Thor-DM21 Able-Star	CCAFS LC-17B	LOFTI-2, SECOR, GRAB-4 (Solrad 4), Injun 2, SURCAL 1	Technology, Geodesy, ELINT, Ionospheric, Calibration	Failure (second stage insufficient thrust)	
1962-05-10 12:06	Thor 314 Ablestar 011	Thor-DM21 Able-Star	CCAFS LC-17B	ANNA 1A	Geodesy	Failure (second stage failed to ignite)	
1962-10-31 08:08	Thor 319 Ablestar 012	Thor-DM21 Able-Star	CCAFS LC-17A	ANNA 1B	Geodesy	Success, final flight of Thor DM-21 Ablestar	
1963-09-28	Thor 375	Thor-DSV2A Able-Star	VAFB LC-75-1-1	Transit 5BN-1 / Transit 5E-1	Navigation	Success	
1963-05-12	Thor 385	Thor-DSV2A Able-Star	VAFB LC-75-1-1	Transit 5BN-2 / Transit 5E-3	Navigation	Success	
1964-04-21 18:50	Thor 379 Ablestar 014	Thor-DSV2A Able-Star	VAFB LC-75-1-1	Transit 5BN-3, Transit 5E-4	Navigation	Failure	
1964-10-06 17:04:21	Thor 423 Ablestar 016	Thor-DSV2A Able-Star	VAFB LC-75-1-2	OPS 5796 (Transit O-1), Dragsphere 1, Dragsphere 2	Navigation	Success	
1964-12-13 00:08:10	Thor 427 Ablestar 017	Thor-DSV2A Able-Star	VAFB LC-75-1-2	OPS 6582 (Transit O-2) (Transit 5B-5), Transit 5E-5	Navigation	Success	
1965-03-11 13:39	Thor 440 Ablestar 018	Thor-DSV2A Able-Star	VAFB LC-75-1-1	OPS 7087 (Transit O-3), SECOR 2	Navigation, Geodesy	Success	
1965-06-24 22:35	Thor 447 Ablestar 019	Thor-DSV2A Able-Star	VAFB LC-75-1-1	OPS 8480 (Transit O-4)	Navigation	Success	
1965-08-13 22:11	Thor 455 Ablestar 020	Thor-DSV2A Able-Star	VAFB LC-75-1-1	OPS 8464 (Transit O-5), Dodecapole 2, Tempsat 1, Surcal 5, Long Rod 1, Calsphere 2	Navigation, Calibration	Success, final flight of Thor-Ablestar	

== See also ==
- List of Thor and Delta launches (1960–1969)
