= ANNA 1B =

United States satellite

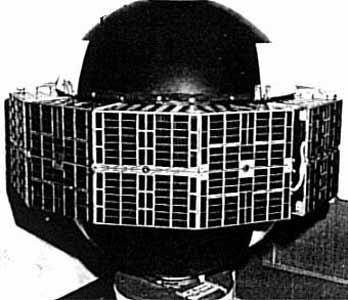
- Photo of ANNA 1B
- Mission type: Geodetic research
- Operator: Department of Defense / NASA
- COSPAR ID: 1962-060A
- SATCAT no.: 00446

Spacecraft properties
- Manufacturer: Applied Physics Laboratory
- Launch mass: 161 kilograms (355 lb)

Start of mission
- Launch date: October 31, 1962, 08:03:00 UTC
- Rocket: Thor-DM21 Able Star
- Launch site: Cape Canaveral LC-17A

Orbital parameters
- Reference system: Geocentric
- Regime: Low Earth
- Semi-major axis: 7,505.0 kilometers (4,663.4 mi)
- Perigee altitude: 1,081.6 kilometers (672.1 mi)
- Apogee altitude: 1,186.7 kilometers (737.4 mi)
- Inclination: 50.1°
- Period: 107.8 minutes

ANNA 1B (acronym for "Army, Navy, NASA, Air Force") was a United States satellite launched on October 31, 1962, from Cape Canaveral, on a Thor-Ablestar rocket.

== Features ==
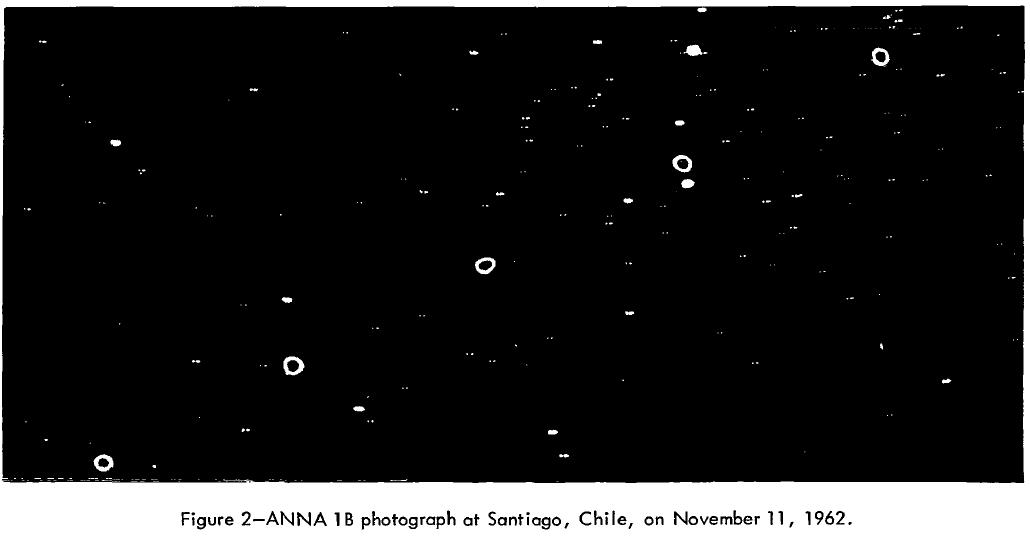
ANNA 1B track on photography taken by Santiago (Chile) MOTS station on November 11, 1962

ANNA 1B's predecessor launched on May 10, 1962, but failed to reach orbit.

ANNA 1B was a US Navy geodetic satellite launched from Cape Canaveral by a Thor Able Star rocket. The mission profile involved ANNA serving as a reference for making precise geodetic surveys, allowing measurement of the force and direction of the gravity field of Earth, locating the middle of land masses and establishing surface positions.

ANNA 1B was spherically shaped with a diameter of 0.91 meters and a weight of 161 kg. It was powered by a band of solar cells around its equator supported by nickel-cadmium batteries. A communications antenna was wrapped around the spiral surface of the satellite.

The ship's instrumentation included optical systems, radio location, and Doppler radar. The optical system consists of a high intensity beacon which transmits a series of five flashes with a period of 5.6 seconds. This allowed one to accurately measure land masses by ground-to-sky satellite photographs (optical tracking or stellar triangulation). The Doppler radar system could also be programmed from the ground control station allowing geopositioning with an accuracy of 20 meters or less.

== Bibliography ==
- Bramschere, Robert G (1980). "A Survey of Launch Vehicle Failures". Spaceflight 22: 351.
