= Courier 1B =

1960 American communications satellite

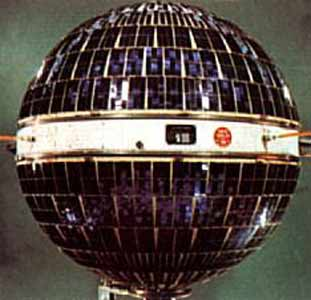
- Courier 1 satellite
- Mission type: Communications
- Operator: US Army / ARPA
- Harvard designation: 1960 NU 1
- COSPAR ID: 1960-013A
- SATCAT no.: 00058
- Mission duration: 17 days (achieved); 65 years, 8 months and 15 days (in orbit)
- Orbits completed: 1000

Spacecraft properties
- Manufacturer: Western Development Labs, division of Philco
- Launch mass: 225 kg
- Power: 60 watts

Start of mission
- Launch date: 4 October 1960, 17:45:00 GMT
- Rocket: Thor-Able-Star
- Launch site: Cape Canaveral, LC-17B
- Contractor: Douglas / Aerojet

End of mission
- Last contact: 21 October 1960

Orbital parameters
- Reference system: Geocentric
- Regime: Low Earth
- Perigee altitude: 938 km
- Apogee altitude: 1237 km
- Inclination: 28.33°
- Period: 106.8 minutes
- Epoch: 4 October 1960

Universal newsreel about the launch of Courier 1B

Courier 1B, is the world's first active repeater communications satellite, Courier 1B was successfully launched on October 4, 1960 at 17:45:00 GMT from Cape Canaveral, Florida. The first Courier satellite in Project Courier, Courier 1A, was lost 2.5 minutes after lift-off on August 18, 1960.

== History ==
As a Cold War initiative, Courier 1B was the 26th satellite launched by the US as opposed to the Soviet Union's six satellites since Sputnik I in 1957. Proposed by the US Army Signal Corps in September 1958, Courier 1B was a follow-up to SCORE program launched December 18, 1958. SCORE "was the first step of an evolutionary program to develop communication satellite systems for use by the military services". The Project Courier was a joint program of the US Department of Defense (ARPA) along with the US Army Signal Research and Development Laboratory at Fort Monmouth, New Jersey.

Courier 1B would receive messages or photographs, store them, and then re-transmit them. Courier 1B was:

An experimental system to demonstrate the feasibility of using satellites for providing a solution to global communications problems. It was designed to store teletype messages and transmit them at high speed while the satellite is in view of a ground station... orbiting Earth at 1,000 kilometres (620 mi).

== Spacecraft ==
Courier 1B was built by the Western Development Labs (WDL) division of Philco, previously known as "Army Fort Monmouth Laboratories". Philco was bought by Ford Motor Company, becoming part of its Ford Aerospace division, which was acquired by Loral Corporation. WDL then became part of Space Systems/Loral division of Loral Space & Communications. IT&T provided ground support equipment and Radiation, Inc, Melbourne, Florida, made the large dish ground antennas. Sonotone Corporation, Elmsford, New York developed the on-board power system for the satellite.

Courier 1B was a 225 kilograms (496 lb), 129.5 centimetres (51.0 in) diameter sphere, 135 kilograms (298 lb) of this was the electronic equipment payload. It carried four 2-W microwave FM (1700-1800 MHz) transmitters and a 50-mW transistorized VHF beacon transmitter subsystem. It contained four solid-state receivers in the 1800-1900 MHz microwave band. Five tape recorders were used to store data for later playback. Four of these were digital with a total capacity of 13.2 Mb (4 minutes at 55 kbit/s) each. One was an analog recorder with a 4-minute capacity and a range of 300 to 50,000 Hz.

Four whip antennas were mounted at 90° intervals along the equator of the sphere. It also held two microwave antennas, a transistorized telemetry generator, a VHF diplexer, and a command decoder. The transmitters and receivers were set up so two of each would be running at any given time, the others were on standby and could be switched in by ground command. The sphere was covered with 19,200 solar cells, charging nickel-cadmium batteries, providing 60 W power. It was the first satellite to use nickel–cadmium storage batteries.

The satellite had the capability to simultaneously transmit, receive, and store approximately 68,000 coded words per minute. It also had real-time communications mode, supporting a single half-duplex voice circuit. The mission was operated by two monitoring stations in New Jersey and Puerto Rico using special 8.5 meters of dish antennas.

== Mission ==
Courier 1B launched on 4 October 1960 at 17:45:00 GMT from the Atlantic Missile Range at Cape Canaveral, Florida. The launch vehicle was a Thor-Able-Star, comprising a modified USAF Thor IRBM first stage and a USAF Able-Star upper stage with a re-startable liquid engine. The satellite was successfully inserted into an orbit with a perigee of 938 kilometres (583 mi), an apogee of 1,237 kilometres (769 mi), an inclination of 28.33°, and an Orbital period of 106.8 minutes. Messages were successfully received and transmitted and the satellite operated nominally until a command system failure ended communications 17 days after launch.

After completing a first orbit, a teletype message to the United Nations General Assembly from President of the United States Dwight D. Eisenhower was sent to United States Secretary of State Christian Herter, to be delivered by Herter to Frederick Boland, President of the General Assembly at the United Nations then in session at New York. The message of Eisenhower was transmitted by Courier 1B from the Camp Evans, Deal Test Site, a New Jersey off-base transmission facility of Fort Monmouth. The message was relayed to the Camp Salinas Training Area, a ground station and tracking installation in Salinas, Puerto Rico. If Courier 1B was in sight of the two ground stations at the same time, Courier 1B had the capability of "real time" messaging.

Courier 1B had an effective message transmission rate of 55,000 bits per second and used ultra–high frequency (UHF) communications. This portion of the electromagnetic spectrum had remained relatively unused and generally free from man-made and atmospheric interference. The Courier satellite could simultaneously transmit and receive approximately 68,000 words per minute while moving through space at 16,000 miles per hour, and could send and receive facsimile photographs.

After 228 orbits over 17 days, the payload failed to respond to commands. It was believed that the clock-based access codes got out of synchronization and the satellite would not respond to what it interpreted as unauthorized commands.

== See also ==
- List of communications satellite firsts
