= SECOR =

[SEC]

SECOR (Sequential Collation of Ranges) was a series of small United States Armed Forces satellites launched in the 1960s for geodesy measurements that precisely determined the locations of points on the Earth's surface, particularly of isolated islands in the Pacific Ocean. This data allowed for improved global mapping and precise positioning of ground stations for other satellites.

Any SECOR satellite could be linked to four mobile ground stations: three were placed in accurately determined known locations, and a fourth one was placed in an unknown location. By measuring a satellite's distance from the three known stations, its position in space was determined. Then, the distance between the unknown ground station and the previously determined satellite's position was used to compute the unknown ground station's coordinates. This process was repeated many times, to enhance the accuracy of the measurement. Once the unknown station's position was accurately determined, it became a known station. Then one of the four stations was moved to a new unknown point, and the process began again.

SECOR was a predecessor to navigational satellite systems such as Timation and Navstar-GPS (Global Positioning System).

== Satellites ==
Fifteen dedicated SECOR satellites were made, and eight SECOR transponders flew as a subsystem of other satellites.

Two versions of SECOR satellites were built, Type I and Type II. They had several differences, but they also shared many features. Therefore, a detailed description is provided for Type I, and a differences-only summary for Type II.

=== Type I ===
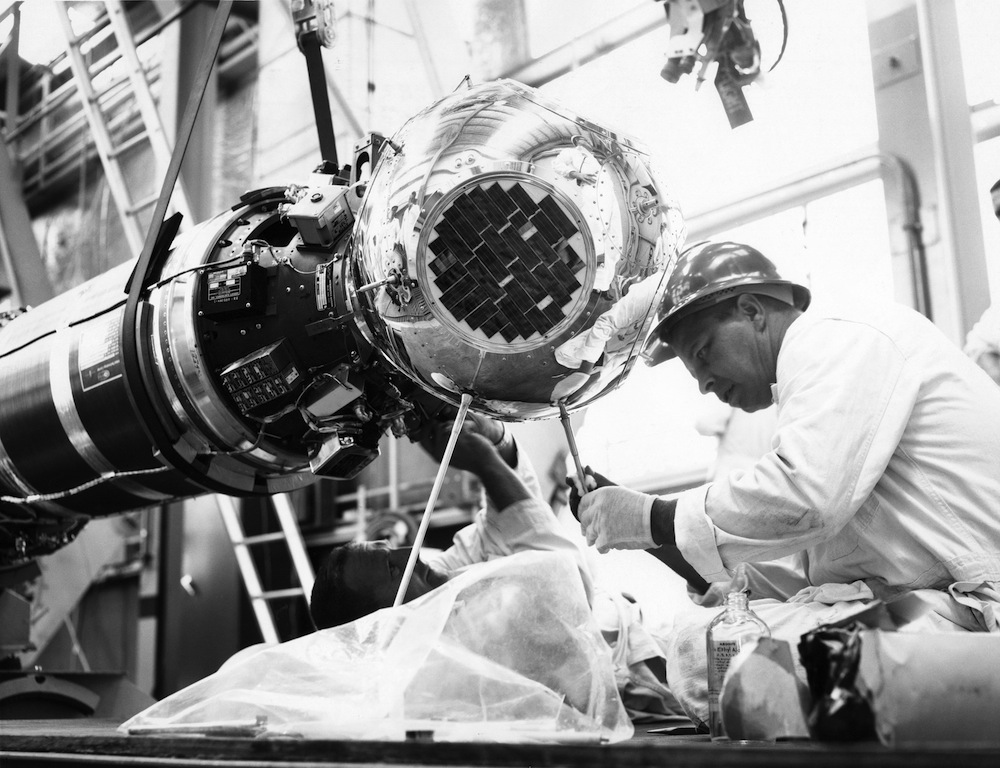
An engineer from Ling-Temco-Vought makes final adjustments to a SECOR satellite.

==== Description ====
The Type 1 SECOR satellites were spherical, 50.8 cm (20.0 in) in diameter, in construction similar to Vanguard III and the early SOLRAD/Galactic Radiation and Background (GRAB) spacecraft. The satellites massed 16.8 kg (37 lb) in average, with most of it being batteries and voltage regulators. Their surface was made of polished aluminium covered with a thin layer of silicon monoxide to help with thermal regulation. There were nine collapsible antennas, eight around the equator for distance measurement and one atop the sphere for telemetry and command. A hollow cone connected the upper stage of the launch vehicle to the base of the satellite. Expected lifespan was one year.

==== Electrical power ====
Six sets of 160 solar cells were mounted on aluminium plates around the surface, providing 17 volts. Within the sphere, a vertically aligned cylinder housed the batteries and voltage regulators. A stable voltage was essential for accurate transponder operation, and, in addition to the voltage regulators, each battery cell in the battery was matched to within 0.03 volts in their discharge curves.

==== Transponder ====
The transponder was placed on a framework within the remaining space.

==== Telemetry ====
Each satellite was equipped to transmit data such as battery charge, voltages, temperature of equipment inside the satellite, etc. Later satellites had more telemetry channels.

==== Passive attitude control ====
On the inner side of the skin, a magnetic rod was placed. It aligned itself with Earth's magnetic field, thus keeping the satellite in a constant orientation. Also inside the skin, many despin coils were placed. These devices were used to stop undesired rotation induced by launch vehicle separation, and by passing near the magnetic poles of Earth. The despin coils were simply large wire coils that were electrically shorted. Rotational movement within Earth's magnetic field induced current on the coils. The current in the coils generated a magnetic field of its own that opposed Earth's, thus slowing the satellite's rotation. As the coils were shorted, the electric current was converted to heat and dissipated to space. The initial braking took several days because of the weak magnetic field at the typical SECOR orbital altitudes.

=== Type II ===
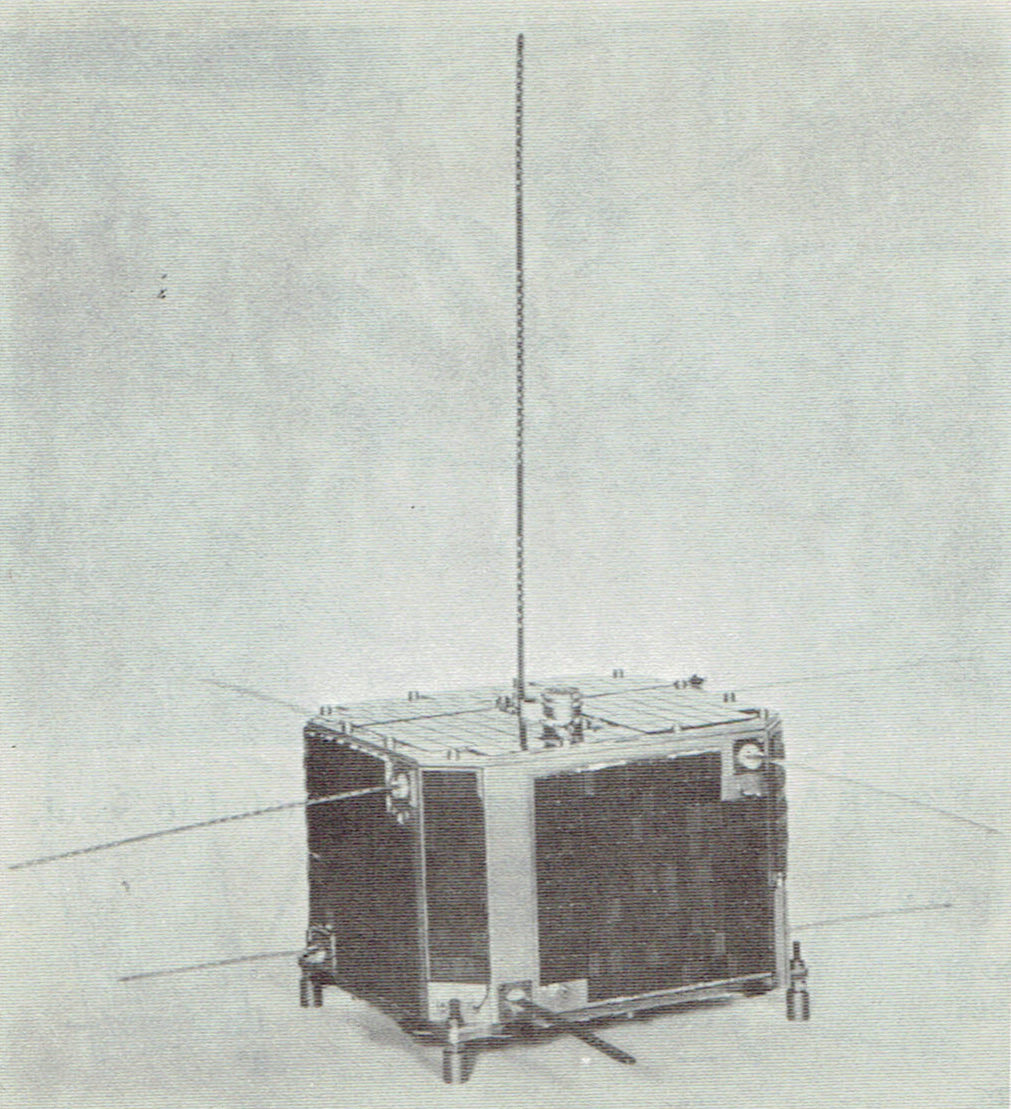
SECOR-1 satellite

These later satellites were made in the shape of a rectangular prism, measuring 25.3 × 29.8 × 34.9 cm (10.0 × 11.7 × 13.7 in). They were almost fully covered in solar cells, and the antennas were made of flexible steel tape. They were much more compact, and thus worked better as secondary payloads. They were designed to avoid removing covers and panels during satellite pre-launch checks. Their antennas were perforated, to diminish antenna shadow over the solar panels.

=== Non-dedicated ===
SECOR transponders were also attached to a number of satellites. While the specific implementation was done on a case-by-case basis, the general idea was to place a transponder either outside/inside of a host satellite, sharing power, antennas, and telemetry with other experiments.

== Ground stations ==
The ground stations were transportable. They consisted of three shelters, one for radio equipment, one for data handling, and one for storage. Generators and air conditioning for the electronic equipment were included.

Lighter weight, solid-state electronics equipment was eventually developed to replace the initial units.

=== Radio equipment ===
The equipment was designed for all-weather operation.

- Send Transponder on/off command
- Receive Satellite Battery Voltage
- Receive Satellite temperatures (shell, battery and amplifier)

=== Data handling ===
The data was recorded on magnetic tape and processed by a computer.

=== Storage ===
- Fuel and other consumables

== System operation ==
- Determine the distance between the satellite and the stations several times.
- Compute the position of the satellite relative to the three known stations by trilateration.
- Compute the possible positions of the unknown ground station that could yield the measured distance.
- Repeat the cycle, narrowing down the set of possible positions with each satellite pass until the accuracy is deemed acceptable.

First, the distances between each station and a satellite were obtained and recorded. The distances between the known positions and this satellite were used to determine the satellite's location in space, and then, the previously measured distance from the fourth station and the calculated satellite position were used to calculate the coordinates of the fourth station with respect to the three known stations.

The accuracy of the position calculations was enhanced by the great amount of data obtained in each satellite pass. At about 70 measurements per second, and considering the time the satellite was visible from the ground station, a typical satellite pass yielded approximately 48,000 measurements. Because depending on the exact angle between the satellite and a ground station, the precision could have variation, data was collected during several passes. This allowed data from the best passes to be selected, while still conserving a great amount of redundancy.

Once enough measurements had been made to ensure the unknown position was precisely established, one of the stations was moved to a different place and became the new unknown position. In this way, former measurements helped establish new positions.

== Launch history ==
Sources differ in details such as names and launch dates. When there are inconsistencies, sources are provided for both.

Name	Launch date	International Designator	Launch vehicle	Launched from	Satellite type	Notes
Transit 3B	22 February 1961, 03:45 GMT	1961-007A	Thor-Ablestar	Cape Canaveral Air Force Station	Shared	Launch failure, satellites failed to separate and were placed in a low orbit. Decayed 37 days after launch.
DISCOVERER 33	23 October 1961	1961-F10	Thor-Agena B	Vandenberg AFB	Shared	Launch failure
DISCOVERER 34	5 November 1961	1961-029A	Thor-Agena B	Vandenberg AFB	Shared	Partial success
DISCOVERER 36	12 December 1961	1961-034A	Thor-Agena B	Vandenberg AFB	Shared	Partial success
COMPOSITE I	24 January 1962	1962-F02	Thor Ablestar	Cape Canaveral Air Force Station	Type I	Launch failure, the second stage failed to add enough velocity.
ANNA 1A	10 May 1962	1962-F04	Thor Ablestar	Cape Canaveral Air Force Station	Shared	Launch failure.
ANNA 1B	31 October 1962	1962-060A	Thor Ablestar	Cape Canaveral Air Force Station	Shared	Partial success
SECOR-1 (EGRS-1), SECOR-1B	11 January 1964	1964-001C	Thor Augmented Delta-Agena D	Vandenberg AFB	Type II	Success.
SECOR 3 (EGRS-3)	9 March 1965	1965-016E	Thor Augmented Delta-Agena D	Vandenberg AFB	Type II	Success.
SECOR 2 (EGRS-2)	9 March 1965	1965-017B	Thor Augmented Delta-Agena D	Vandenberg AFB	Type II	Success, decayed 25 February 1968.
SECOR 4 (EGRS-4)	3 April 1965	1965-027B	Atlas-Agena D	Vandenberg AFB	Type II	Transponder failure. U.S. Army / U.S. Air Force
EGRS V	10 August 1965	1965-063A	Scout B	Wallops Flight Facility	Type I	Partial success
Explorer 29 (GEOS A)	6 November 1965	1965-089A	Thor-Delta E	Vandenberg AFB	Shared	Success.
SECOR 6 (EGRS-6)	9 June 1966	1966-051B	Atlas-Agena D	Vandenberg AFB	Type II	Success. U.S. Army / U.S. Air Force
SECOR 7 (EGRS-7)	19 August 1966	1966-077B	Atlas-Agena D	Vandenberg AFB	Type II	Partial success
SECOR 8 (EGRS-8)	5 October 1966	1966-089B	Atlas-Agena D	Vandenberg AFB	Type II	Transponder failure. U.S. Air Force
SECOR 9 (EGRS-9)	29 June 1967	1967-065A	Thor-Burner	Vandenberg AFB	Type II	Success. U.S. Army / U.S. Navy
Explorer 36 (GEOS B)	11 January 1968	1968-002A	Thor-Delta E1	Vandenberg AFB	Shared	Success.
SECOR 10 (EGRS-10)	18 May 1968	1968-F04	Thorad SLV2G-Agena D	Vandenberg AFB	Type II	Launch failure.
SECOR 11 (EGRS-11)	16 August 1968	1968-F07	Atlas SLV3-Burner 2	Vandenberg AFB	Type II	Launch failure.
SECOR 12 (EGRS 12)	16 August 1968	1968-F07	Atlas SLV3-Burner-2	Vandenberg AFB	Type II	Launch failure.
SECOR 13 (EGRS 13)	14 April 1969	1969-037B	Thor-Agena	Vandenberg AFB	Type II	Success.
TOPO I	8 April 1970	1970-025B	Thorad SLV2G-Agena D	Vandenberg AFB	Type II	Success.

== Notes ==
EGRS (Engineer Geodetic Research Satellite) was the U.S. Army Corps of Engineers acronym for the SECOR satellites.
