= SURCAL =

Series of radar calibration satellites

The Surveillance Calibration (or SURCAL) satellites were a series of radar calibration satellites for the Naval Space Surveillance radar system. They were launched in the 1960s.

== Background ==
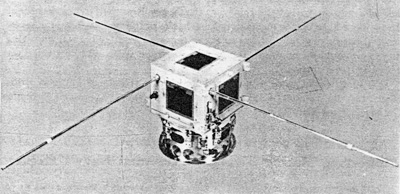
SURCAL 5

The SURCAL series of satellites were produced by the Naval Research Laboratory to act as test and calibration targets for the Naval Space Surveillance radar. The first SURCAL satellite was intended to remain attached to the launch vehicle and was a 5.5 inch long, 5.5 inch diameter cylinder. The other four SURCAL satellites were box-shaped with solar panels, a transponder, and antennas. They transmitted a 216 MHz signal on command.

== Launches ==
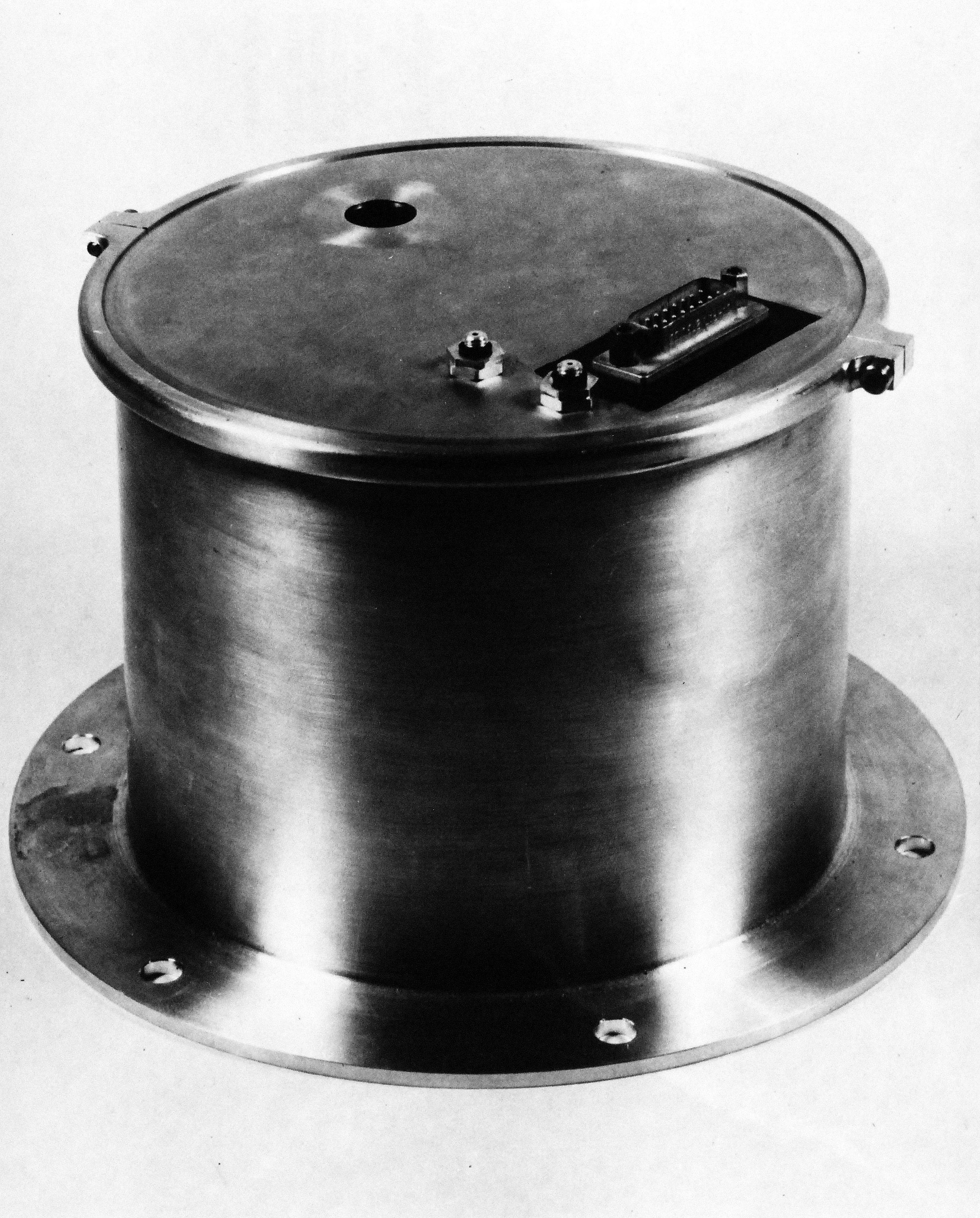
SURCAL 1

SURCAL Satellites
Name	COSPAR	Launch date	Rocket	Mass (kg)	Re-entry
SURCAL 1	N/A	24 January 1962	Thor-Able-Star	98.5 kg	Launch failure
SURCAL 2 (Note: Also listed as SURCAL 1A)	1962 B Tau 4	13 December 1962	Thor-Agena-D	37 kg	18 Jan 1966
SURCAL 3 (Note: Also listed as SURCAL 1B)	1962-021F	15 June 1963	Thor-Agena-D	3 kg	5 Jul 1963
SURCAL 4 (Note: Also listed as SURCAL 2B)	1965-016G	9 March 1965	Thor-Agena-D	5 kg	27 March 1981
SURCAL 5	1965-065K	9 March 1965	Thor-Able-Star		In orbit

== Other vehicles ==
Astronautix includes passive satellites such as the SURCAL 150B and SURCAL 160 target objects as part of the SURCAL program.
