= LOFTI-1 =

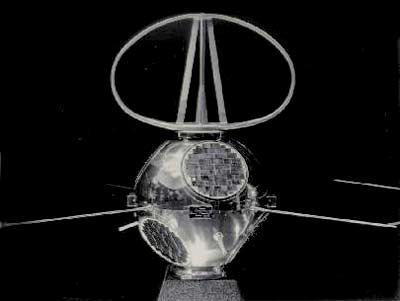
- LOFTI-1 before launch
- Mission type: Ionospheric
- Operator: US Navy/NRL
- Harvard designation: 1961 Eta 1
- COSPAR ID: 1961-007A
- SATCAT no.: 00087

Spacecraft properties
- Manufacturer: NRL
- Launch mass: 26 kilograms (57 lb)

Start of mission
- Launch date: 22 February 1961, 03:45 UTC
- Rocket: Thor DM-21 Ablestar 313 (AB-007)
- Launch site: Cape Canaveral LC-17B

End of mission
- Decay date: 30 March 1961

Orbital parameters
- Reference system: Geocentric
- Regime: Low Earth
- Perigee altitude: 167 kilometers (104 mi)
- Apogee altitude: 1,002 kilometers (623 mi)
- Inclination: 28.3 degrees
- Period: 96.4 minutes
- Epoch: 21 February 1961, 22:50:00 UTC

LOFTI-1 was an American satellite which was launched in 1961 and operated by the United States Navy and Naval Research Laboratory. It was used to conduct research into the propagation of very low frequency radio signals in the ionosphere, and to investigate if these signals could be received by submarines. A 136.17 MHz transmitter was used for this investigation.

The launch of LOFTI-1 was conducted at 03:45 UTC on 22 February 1961, using a Thor DM-21 Ablestar rocket flying from Launch Complex 17B at the Cape Canaveral Air Force Station. It was a secondary payload aboard the rocket, with the primary payload being the Transit 3B prototype navigation satellite. The rocket and upper stage used had the serial numbers Thor 313 and Ablestar 007 respectively. The launch resulted in a partial failure, with the spacecraft being placed in a more eccentric orbit than planned, and failing to separate from the upper stage.

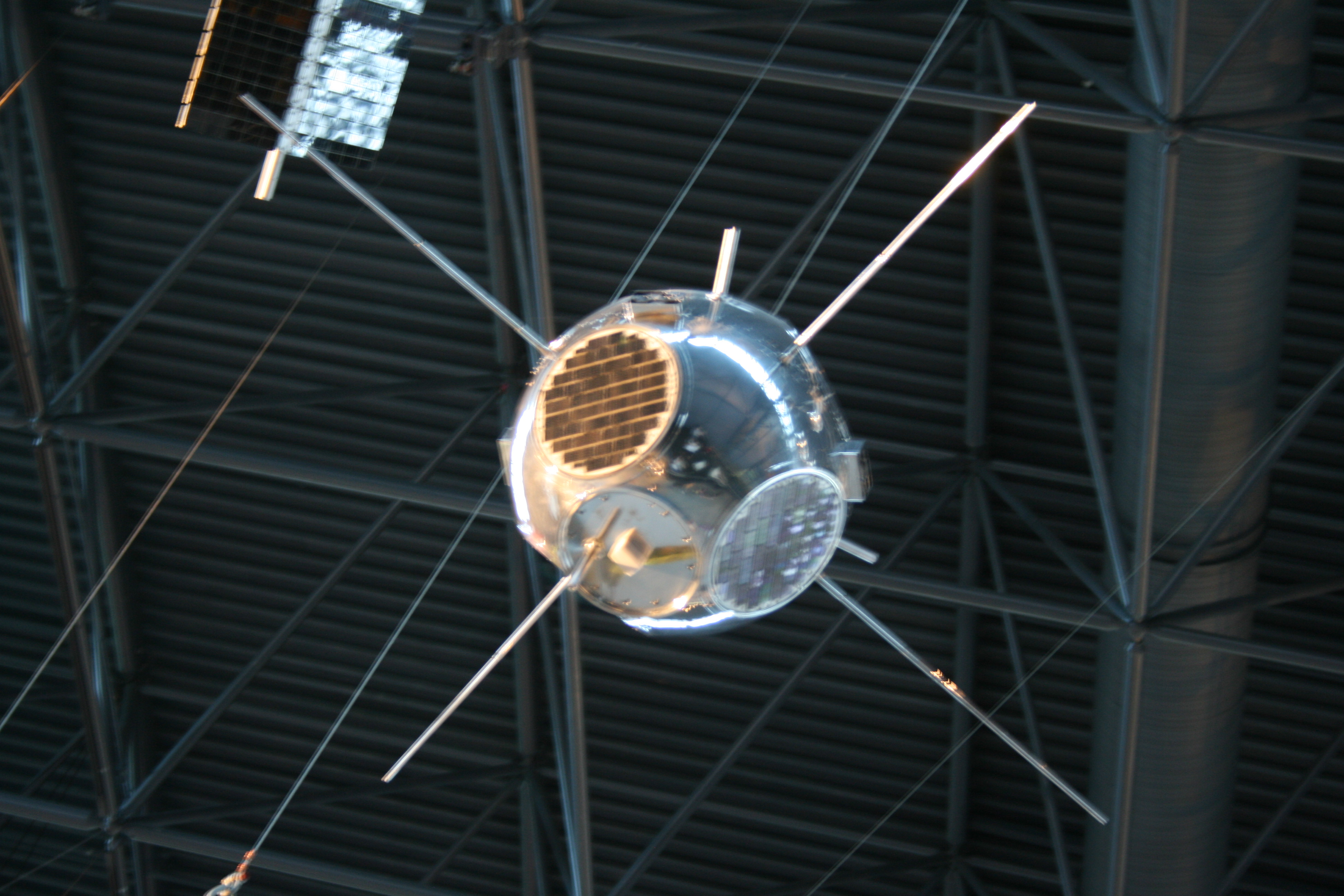
LOFTI-1 at the Air and Space Museum

LOFTI-1 was a 26-kilogram (57 lb) spacecraft, which was powered by six groups of solar cells charging a nickel-cadmium battery. It ended up in a low Earth orbit with a perigee of 167 kilometres (104 mi), an apogee of 1,002 kilometres (623 mi), and 28.3 degrees of inclination. It had an orbital period of 96.4 minutes. Due to the low perigee of its orbit, LOFTI-1 decayed quickly, and reentered the atmosphere on 30 March 1961, less than 37 days after launch. Despite being in the wrong orbit and operating for less time than had been planned, some useful data was returned from the mission. Together with data returned by later satellites, the data returned by LOFTI-1 proved that very low frequency signals were not suitable for satellite communications with submarines.

== See also ==
- LOFTI-2
