= Able (rocket stage) =

American rocket stage

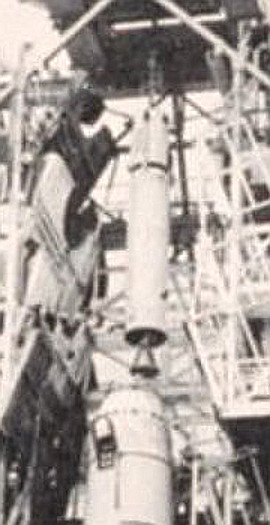
Able rocket stage

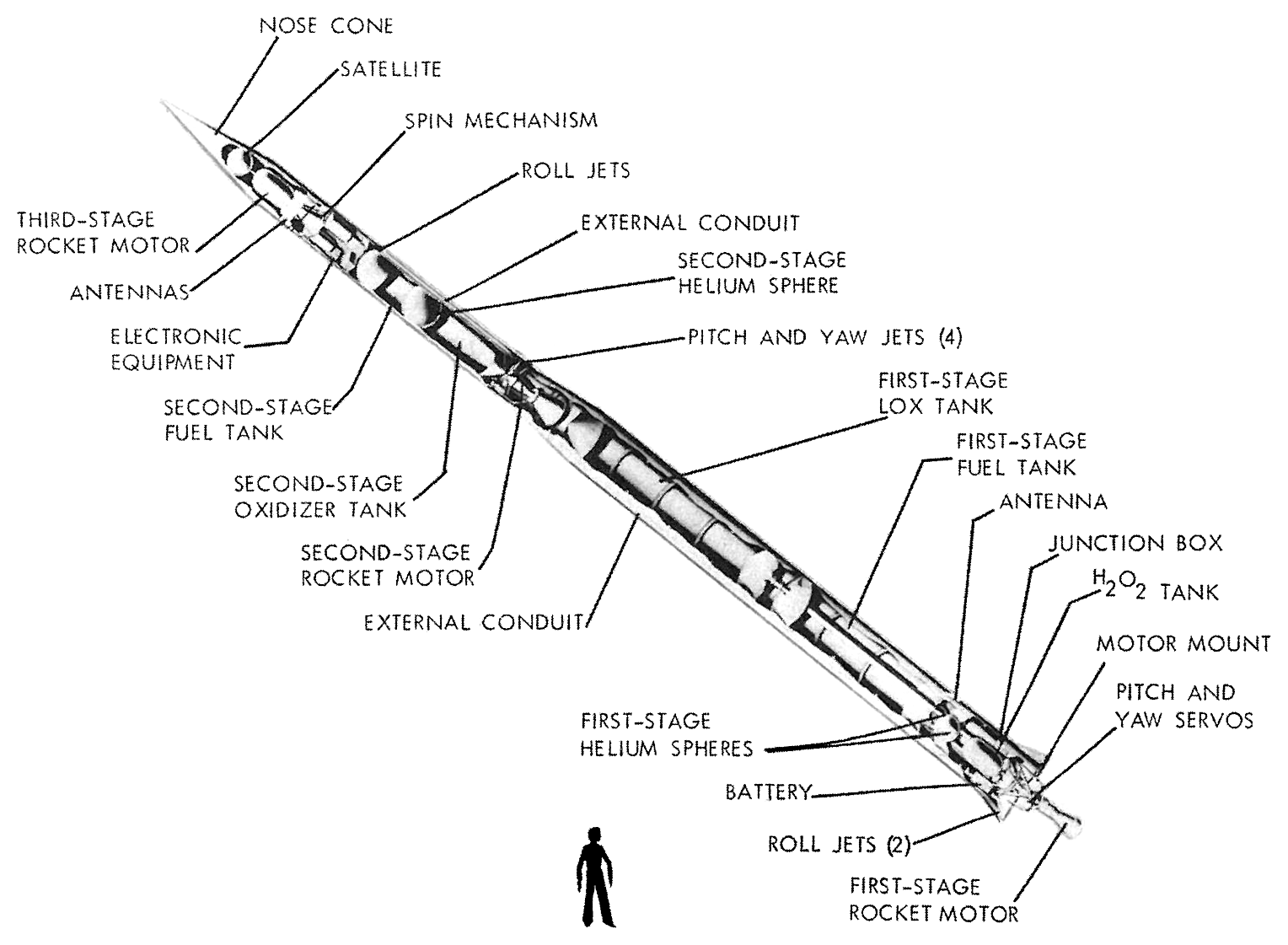
Able rocket stage, is the second stage in the Vanguard rocket cutaway view

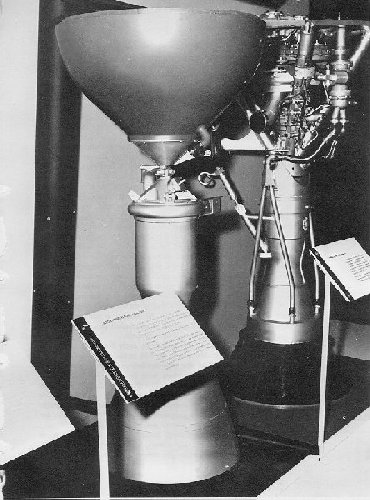
Able rocket stage engine in the foreground

The Able rocket stage was a rocket stage manufactured in the United States by Aerojet as the second of three stages of the Vanguard rocket used in the Vanguard project from 1957 to 1959. The Able stage name represents its place as the first in the series, from the Joint Army/Navy Phonetic Alphabet.

To save weight, Aerojet used an aluminum tube for the engine thrust chamber. The Vanguard used an AJ10-37, burning nitric acid and UDMH as rocket propellants. Aerojet made 21 Able rocket stages for use on launchers. The Vanguard project launched 11 Able stages. Three put satellites into orbit: Vanguard 1, Vanguard 2 and Vanguard 3. The Able rocket stage and the Vanguard project were an important part of the Space Race between the US and Soviet Union. The AJ10 engines used in the Able rocket stage continue to be used on later rockets and are still in use. In honor of the rocket stage during an animals in space test, a rhesus monkey named Miss Able, flew with Miss Baker on May 28, 1959. Later Able stages used AJ10-101 or AJ10-101A rocket engines.

The Able rocket stage was discontinued in 1960. A version of the AJ10 engine used for the Able rocket stage was used as the engine of Apollo Service Module.

The improved Able-Star version was used as the upper stage of the Thor-Ablestar two stage launcher. The Able-Star second stage was an enlarged version of the Able rocket stage using AJ10-104 or AJ10-104D engines, which gave the Thor-Ablestar a greater payload capacity compared to the earlier Thor-Able. It also incorporated restart capabilities, allowing a multiple-burn trajectory to be flown, further increasing payload, or allowing the rocket to reach different orbits. It was the first rocket to be developed with such a capability and development of the stage took a mere eight months.

== Specifications ==
=== Able ===
- Loaded gross mass: 1,884 kg (4,154 lb)
- Empty (unfueled) mass 429 kg (946 lb)
- Thrust 34.69 kN (7,800 lb_{f})
- Specific impulse (vacuum) 270 seconds (2.6 km/s)
- Height: 5.67 m (18.6 ft)
- Diameter: 0.81 m (2 ft 8 in)
- Span: 0.84 m (2 ft 9 in)
- Burn time: 115 seconds
- Engine: AJ10-40, AJ10-101

=== Able-Star ===
- Loaded gross mass: 4,497 kg (9,914 lb)
- Empty (unfueled) mass 599 kg (1,321 lb)
- Thrust 36.02 kN (8,100 lb_{f})
- Specific impulse (vacuum) 280 seconds (2.7 km/s)
- Height: 4.52 m (14.8 ft)
- Diameter: 1.40 m (4 ft 7 in)
- Burn time: 296 seconds
- Engine: AJ10-104, AJ10-104D

== See also ==
- Thor (rocket family)
  - Thor-Able
  - Thor-Agena
  - Thor-Delta
- Atlas-Able
- Thor-Ablestar
- Multistage rocket
  - Three-stage-to-orbit
  - Two-stage-to-orbit
  - Single-stage-to-orbit
