= LOFTI 2 =

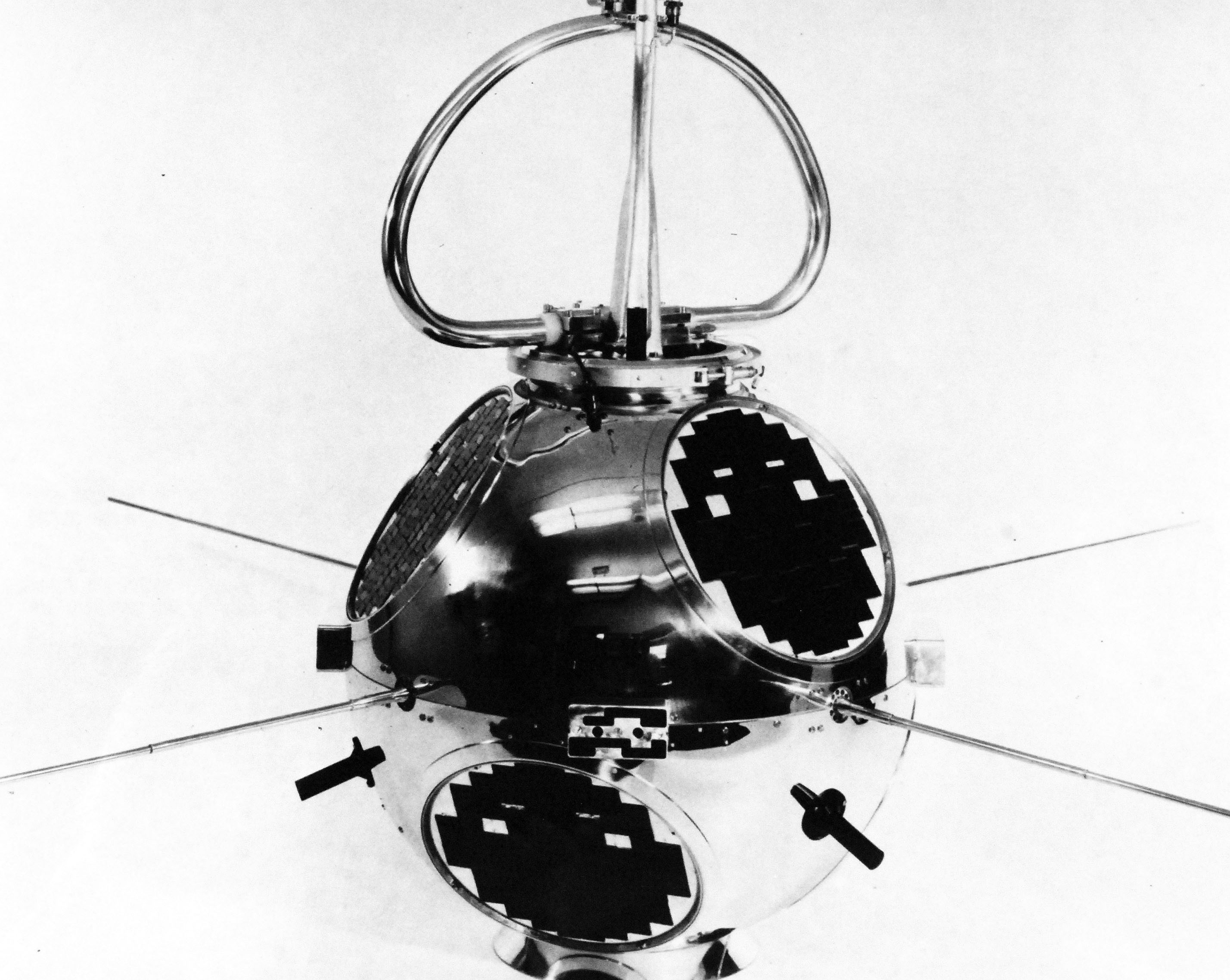
An image of the LOFTI II satellite from the archives of the National Museum of the U.S. Navy

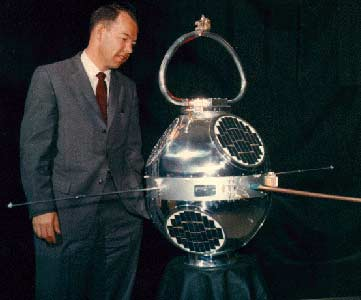
LOFTI 2B

LOFTI 2 ("LOw Frequency Trans Ionospheric Satellite", also styled LOFTI II) refers to a pair of United States Naval Research Laboratory satellites launched in 1962 and 1963 as a follow-on to the LOFTI-1 mission. The program's mission was to study how the ionosphere affected very low frequency transmissions. Both were 20-inch diameter aluminum spheres equipped with extendible antennas.

== LOFTI 2 ==
LOFTI 2 was launched on 24 January 1962 as part of the Composite 1 mission alongside four other satellites. The mission failed to reach orbit.

== LOFTI 2A ==
LOFTI 2A was launched on 15 June 1963 alongside five other satellites. It was equipped with a ten-foot antenna which could be extended to 40 feet remotely. The orbital injection motor on the launch vehicle failed to fire, leaving all of the satellites in the wrong orbit.

== See also ==
- LOFTI-1
