= Transit 3B =

American satellite designed to study geodesy

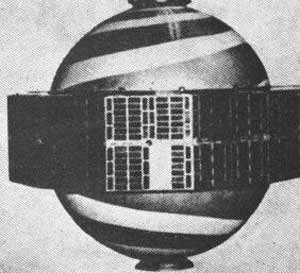
- Transit 3B before launch
- Mission type: Technology; Navigation; Geodesy
- Operator: US Navy
- Harvard designation: 1961 Eta 1
- COSPAR ID: 1961-007A
- SATCAT no.: 87

Spacecraft properties
- Manufacturer: APL
- Launch mass: 113 kilograms (249 lb)

Start of mission
- Launch date: 22 February 1961
- Rocket: Thor DM-21 Ablestar 313/AB-007
- Launch site: Cape Canaveral LC-17B

End of mission
- Decay date: 30 March 1961

Orbital parameters
- Reference system: Geocentric
- Regime: Low Earth
- Perigee altitude: 167 kilometers (104 mi)
- Apogee altitude: 1,002 kilometers (623 mi)
- Inclination: 28.3 degrees
- Period: 96.4 minutes
- Epoch: 21 February 1961, 22:50:00 UTC

Transit 3B was an American satellite which was launched in 1961 and operated by the United States Navy. It was a replacement for Transit 3A, which was lost in a launch failure the previous year. It carried instruments to demonstrate navigation and timing systems, and study geodesy to support the development of the Transit satellite navigation system.

== History ==
The launch of Transit 3B was conducted at 03:45 UTC on 22 February 1961, using a Thor DM-21 Ablestar rocket flying from Launch Complex 17B at the Cape Canaveral Air Force Station. The LOFTI-1 satellite was launched aboard the same rocket. The rocket and upper stage used had the serial numbers Thor 313 and Ablestar 007 respectively. The launch resulted in a partial failure, with the spacecraft being placed in a more eccentric orbit than planned, and failing to separate from the upper stage.

Transit 3B was a 113-kilogram (249 lb) spacecraft, which was powered by 6,600 solar cells charging a nickel-cadmium battery. It ended up in a low Earth orbit with a perigee of 167 kilometres (104 mi), an apogee of 1,002 kilometres (623 mi), and 28.3 degrees of inclination. It had an orbital period of 96.4 minutes. Due to the low perigee of its orbit, Transit 3B decayed quickly, and reentered the atmosphere on 30 March 1961, less than 37 days after launch. Despite being in the wrong orbit and operating for less time than had been planned, some useful data was returned from the mission.

The systems demonstrated by Transit 3B included a digital clock to control timing signals, uploading programs into the onboard computer's memory whilst in orbit, data retention and FM encoding, and the use of phase modulation for data transmission without affecting the satellite's Doppler signal. The satellite's computer had a memory capacity of 48 bytes.
