= Transit (satellite navigation system) =

Satellite navigation system

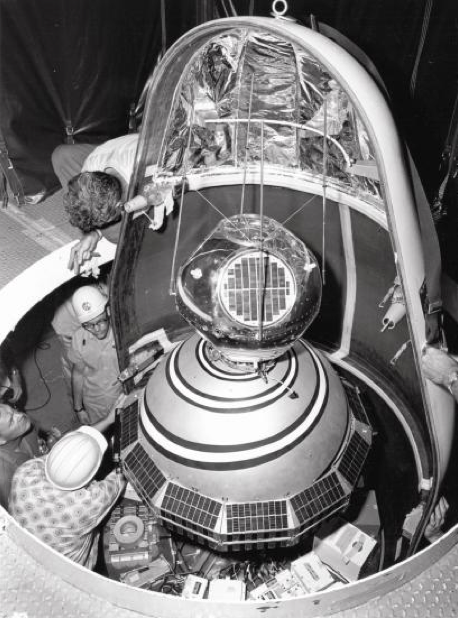
- Transit 2A with SOLRAD 1 atop during launch preparations
- Country/ies of origin: United States
- Status: Retired (1996)

Constellation size
- First launch: 1959
- Last launch: 1988

The Transit system, also known as NAVSAT or NNSS (for Navy Navigation Satellite System), was the first satellite navigation system to be used operationally. The radio navigation system was primarily used by the U.S. Navy to provide accurate location information to its Polaris ballistic missile submarines, and it was also used as a navigation system by the Navy's surface ships, as well as for hydrographic survey and geodetic surveying. Transit provided continuous navigation satellite service from 1964, initially for Polaris submarines and later for civilian use as well. In the Project DAMP Program, the missile tracking ship USAS American Mariner also used data from the satellite for precise ship's location information prior to positioning its tracking radars.

== History ==
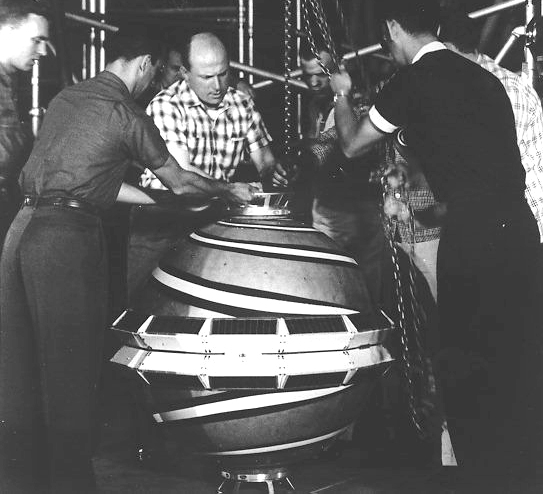
Transit 1A

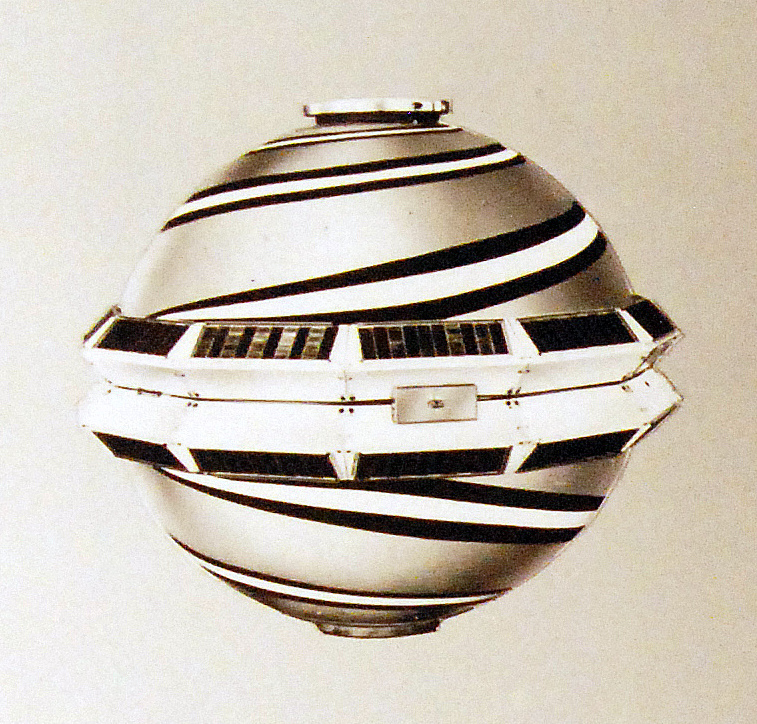
Transit 1B

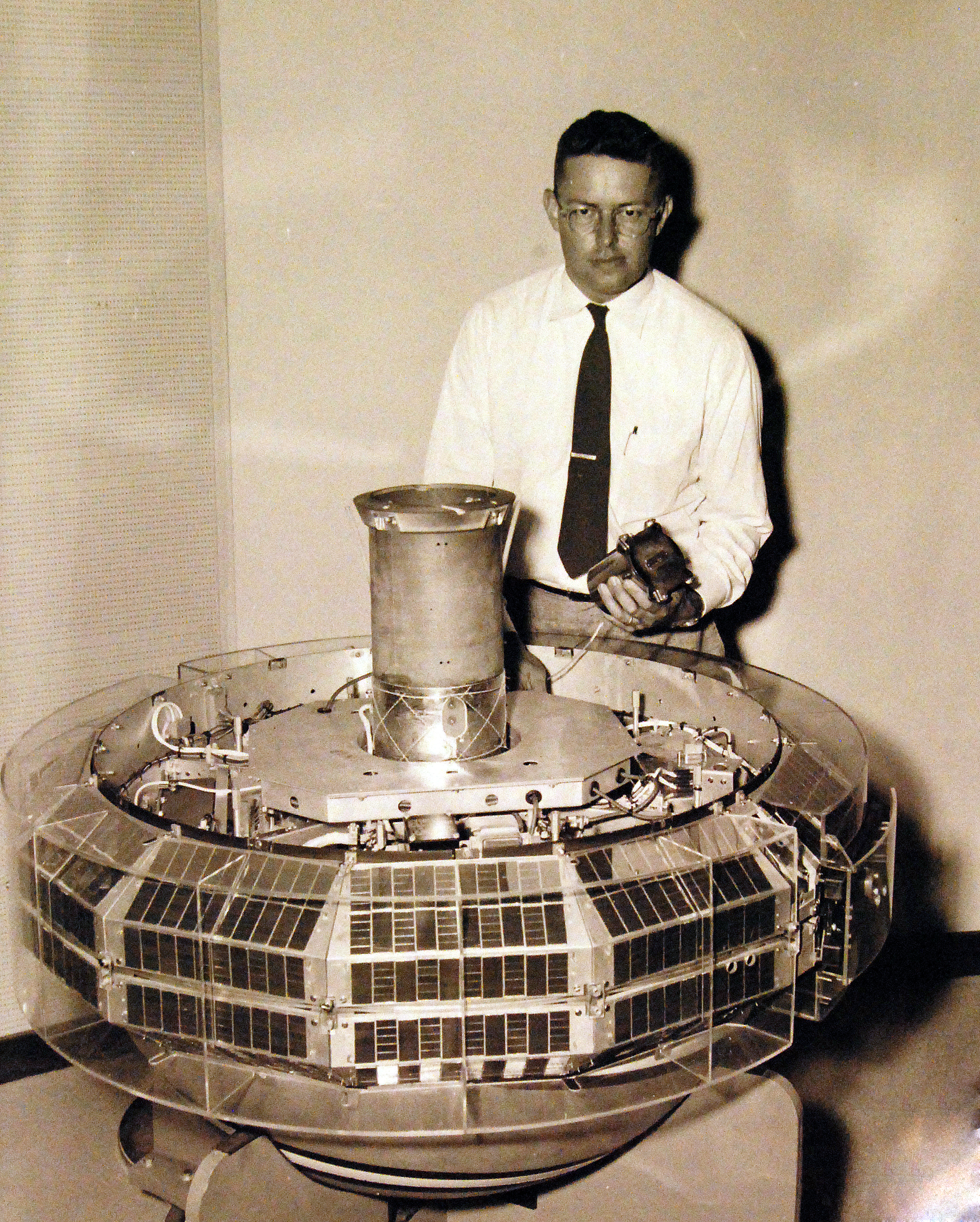
Transit 3A

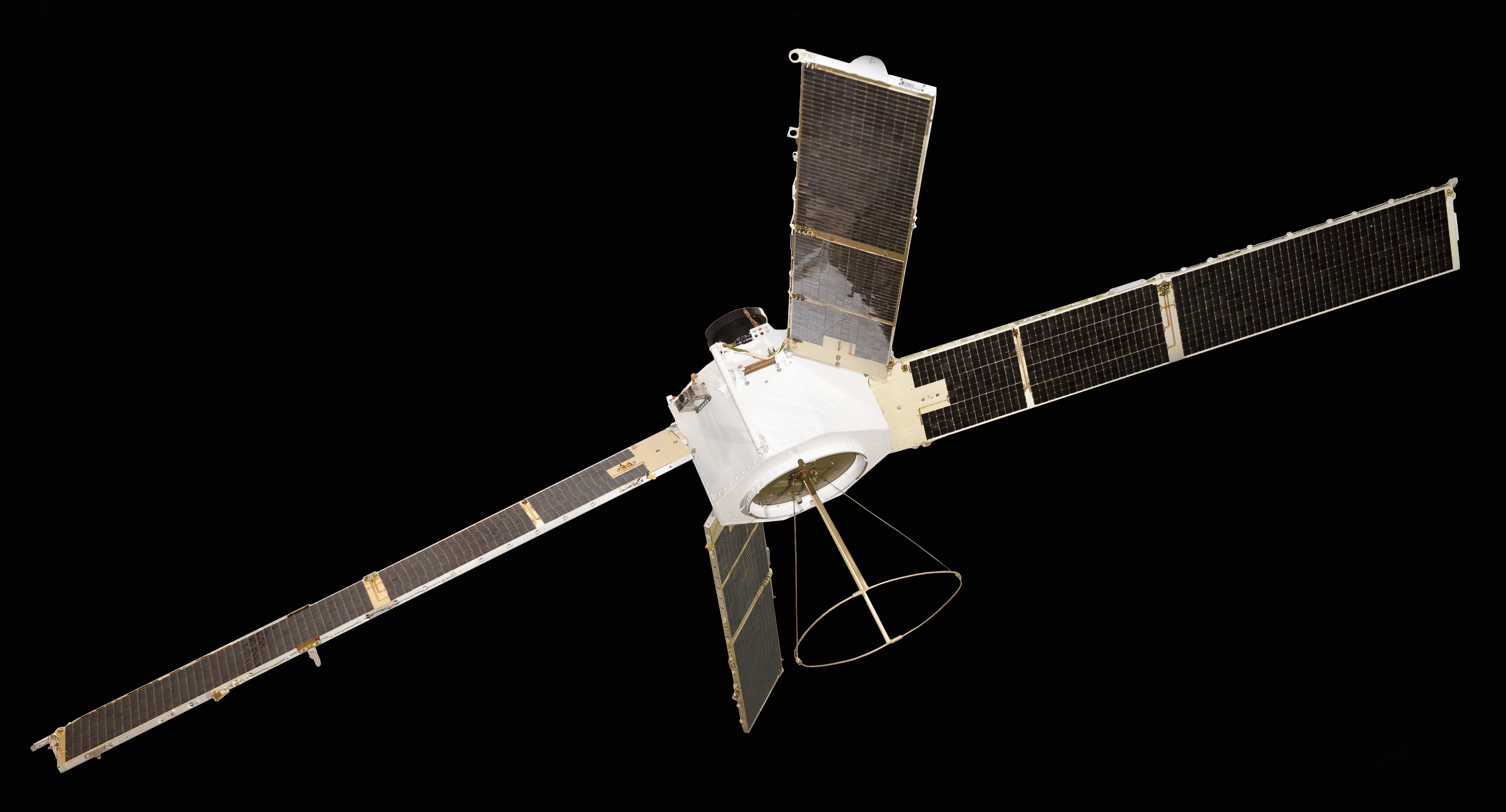
Transit 5A

The Transit satellite system, sponsored by the Navy and developed jointly by the Advanced Research Projects Agency (ARPA) and the Johns Hopkins Applied Physics Laboratory, under the leadership of Dr. Richard Kershner at Johns Hopkins, was the first satellite-based geopositioning system. Just days after the Soviet launch of Sputnik 1, the first man-made Earth-orbiting satellite on October 4, 1957, two physicists at APL, William Guier and George Weiffenbach, found themselves in discussion about the radio signals that would likely be emanating from the satellite. They were able to determine Sputnik's orbit by analyzing the Doppler shift of its radio signals during a single pass. Discussing the way forward for their research, their director Frank McClure, the chairman of APL's Research Center, suggested in March 1958 that if the satellite's position were known and predictable, the Doppler shift could be used to locate a receiver on Earth, and proposed a satellite system to implement this principle.

Development of the Transit system began in 1958, and a prototype satellite, Transit 1A, was launched in September 1959. That satellite failed to reach orbit. A second satellite, Transit 1B, was successfully launched April 13, 1960, by a Thor-Ablestar rocket. The first successful tests of the system were made in 1960, and the system entered Naval service in 1964. A fully operational constellation of 36 satellites was in place in 1968.

The Chance Vought/LTV Scout rocket was selected as the dedicated launch vehicle for the program because it delivered a payload into orbit for the lowest cost per pound. However, the Scout decision imposed two design constraints. First, the weight of the earlier satellites was about 300 pounds (140 kg) each, but the Scout launch capacity to the Transit orbit was about 120 pounds (54 kg), which was later increased significantly. A satellite mass reduction had to be achieved, despite a demand for more power than APL had previously designed into a satellite. The second problem concerned the increased vibration that affected the payload during launching because the Scout used solid rocket motors. Thus, electronic equipment that was smaller than before and rugged enough to withstand the increased vibration of launch had to be produced. Meeting the new demands was more difficult than expected, but it was accomplished. The first prototype operational satellite (Transit 5A-1) was launched into a polar orbit by a Scout rocket on 18 December 1962. The satellite verified a new technique for deploying the solar panels and for separating from the rocket, but otherwise it was not successful because of trouble with the power system. Transit 5A-2, launched on 5 April 1963, failed to achieve orbit. Transit 5A-3, with a redesigned power supply, was launched on 15 June 1963. A malfunction of the memory occurred during powered flight that kept it from accepting and storing the navigation message, and the oscillator stability was degraded during launch. Thus, 5A-3 could not be used for navigation. However, this satellite was the first to achieve gravity-gradient stabilization, and its other subsystems performed well.

Surveyors used Transit to locate remote benchmarks by averaging dozens of Transit fixes, producing sub-meter accuracy. In fact, the elevation of Mount Everest was corrected in the late 1980s by using a Transit receiver to re-survey a nearby benchmark.

Thousands of warships, freighters and private watercraft used Transit from 1967 until 1991. In the 1970s, the Soviet Union started launching their own satellite navigation systems, including Parus (military) and Tsikada (civilian), which were eventually superseded by the next generation GLONASS. Some Soviet warships were equipped with Motorola NavSat receivers.

The Transit system was made obsolete by the Global Positioning System (GPS), and ceased navigation service in 1996. Improvements in electronics allowed GPS receivers to effectively take several fixes at once, greatly reducing the complexity of deducing a position. GPS uses many more satellites than were used with Transit, allowing the system to be used continuously, while Transit provided a fix only every hour or more.

After 1996, the satellites were kept in use for the Navy Ionospheric Monitoring System (NIMS).

== Description ==
=== Satellites ===
The satellites (known as OSCAR or NOVA satellites) used in the system were placed in low polar orbits, at an altitude of about 600 nautical miles (690 mi; 1,100 km), with an orbital period of about 106 minutes. A constellation of five satellites was required to provide reasonable global coverage. While the system was operational, at least ten satellites – one spare for each satellite in the basic constellation – were usually kept in orbit. Note that these OSCAR satellites were not the same as the OSCAR series of satellites that were devoted to use by amateur radio operators to use in satellite communications.

The orbits of the Transit satellites were chosen to cover the entire Earth; they crossed over the poles and were spread out at the equator. Since only one satellite was usually visible at any given time, fixes could be made only when one of the satellites was above the horizon. At the equator this delay between fixes was several hours; at mid-latitudes the delay decreased to an hour or two. For its intended role as an updating system for SLBM launch, Transit sufficed, since submarines took periodic fixes to reset their inertial guidance system, but Transit lacked the ability to provide high-speed, real-time position measurements.

With later improvements, the system provided single-pass accuracy of roughly 200 metres (660 ft), and also provided time synchronization to roughly 50 microseconds. Transit satellites also broadcast encrypted messages, although this was a secondary function.

The Transit satellites used arrays of magnetic-core memory as mass data storage up to 32 kilobytes.

=== Determining ground location ===

Determining a location, also known as "taking a fix", normally requires two or more measurements to be taken to produce a 2D location. In the case of the modern GPS system, dozens of such measurements may be taken depending on which satellites are visible at that time, each one helping improve accuracy. In the case of Transit, only a small number of satellites were in orbit and were spread out. This generally meant there was only one satellite visible at any time. Some other method of determining a second measurement was needed.

Transit did this by measuring the signal's Doppler shift. The spacecraft traveled at about 17,000 mph (27,000 km/h), which could increase or decrease the frequency of the received carrier signal by as much as 10 kHz as measured on the ground. While the satellite is approaching the ground station its signals will be shifted up in frequency, and as it recedes they will shift down again. The precise moment when the frequency is exactly equal to the broadcast frequency is when the satellite's ground track passes the ground location's location (with some corrections). This provides one of the two measurements needed.

For the second measure, one has to consider the pattern of the Doppler shift. If the satellite passes directly overhead, its angular velocity as it passes will be more than if it passes to one side. In the extreme case, with a satellite near the horizon, the relative velocity change is minimized. Thus the rapidity of the change in frequency is an indication of the relative longitude between the station and the satellite. Additionally, the rotation of the Earth provided another Doppler correction which could be used to determine whether the satellite was to the east or west of the ground station.

These measurements produce a relative location compared to the satellite. To determine the actual location, that relative measure is applied to the location of the satellite. This is provided by periodically sending out precise time hacks (every two minutes), plus the satellite's six orbital elements and orbit perturbation variables. The ground receiver downloaded these signals and calculated the location of the satellite while it was measuring the shifts. The orbit ephemeris and clock corrections were uploaded twice each day to each satellite from one of the four Navy tracking and injection stations.

The Transit satellite broadcast on 150 and 400 MHz. The two frequencies were used to allow the refraction of the satellite radio signals by the ionosphere to be canceled out, thereby improving location accuracy. The Transit system also provided the first worldwide timekeeping service, allowing clocks everywhere to be synchronised with 50 microsecond accuracy.

Calculating the most likely receiver location was not a trivial exercise. The navigation software used the satellite's motion to compute a 'trial' Doppler curve, based on an initial 'trial' location for the receiver. The software would then perform a least squares curve fit for each two-minute section of the Doppler curve, recursively moving the trial position until the trial Doppler curve 'most closely' matched the actual Doppler received from the satellite for all two-minute curve segments.

If the receiver was also moving relative to the earth, such as aboard a ship or airplane, this would cause mismatches with the idealized Doppler curves, and degrade position accuracy. However, positional accuracy could usually be computed to within 100 meters for a slow-moving ship, even with reception of just one two-minute Doppler curve. This was the navigation criterion demanded by the U.S. Navy, since American submarines would normally expose their UHF antenna for only 2 minutes to obtain a usable Transit fix. The U.S. submarine version of the Transit system also included a special encrypted, more accurate version of the downloaded satellite's orbital data. This enhanced data allowed for considerably enhanced system accuracy [not unlike Selective Availability (SA) under GPS]. Using this enhanced mode, accuracy was typically less than 20 meters, (i.e. the accuracy was between that of LORAN C and GPS) For a typical 12 – 15 minute high satellite altitude pass accuracy was under ten meters. Certainly, Transit was the most accurate navigation system of its day.

The basic operating principle of Transit is similar to the system used by emergency locator transmitters (ELTs), except that in the latter case the transmitter is on the ground and the receiver is in orbit. ELTs measure the Doppler shift of the transmitter on the boat or aircraft as it passes overhead and forwards that data to the ground where the location of the craft can be determined.

=== Determining the satellite orbits ===
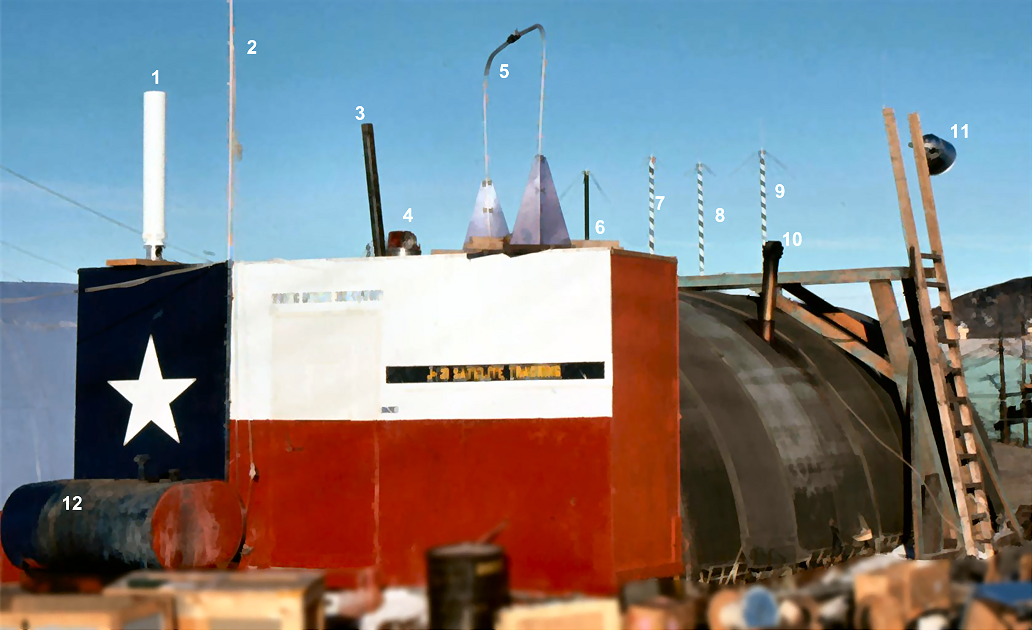
Vestibule and Quonset hut housing Transit satellite tracking station 019. 1. Triad satellite magnetometer down load antenna. 2. flag pole, 3. Utility pole in background, 4 Revolving light temperature alarm, 5 VLF antenna, 6-9 Doppler satellite tracking antennas, 10. stove pipe for heater, 11 Flood light for low visibility conditions, 12 fuel tank.

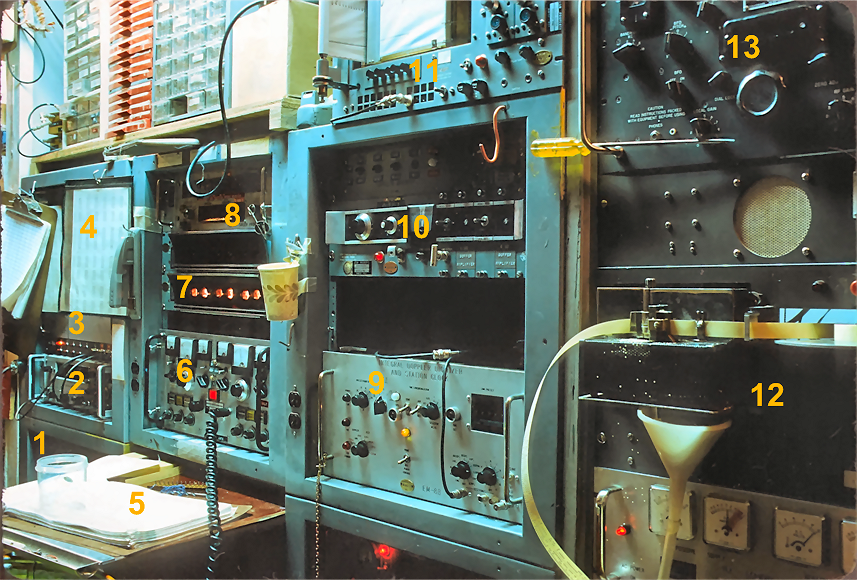
Some of the equipment inside Transit satellite tracking station 019. 1. Automatic Control Unit, 2. timer-counter, 3. Time burst detector, 4. time conversion chart, 5. satellite ephemeris, 6. tracking receiver, 7. time display, 8 Header-Tailer programmer, 9. Digitizer and main clock, 10. master oscillator, 11. strip chart recorder, 12. paper tape punch, 13. short wave receiver. Out of site: VLF receiver, refraction correction unit, backup battery system, power supplies, AC voltage regulators.

A network of ground stations, whose locations were accurately known, continually tracked the Transit satellites. They measured the Doppler shift and transferred the data to 5-hole paper tape. This data was sent to the Satellite Control Center at Applied Physics Laboratory in Laurel, Maryland using commercial and military teleprinter networks. The data from the fixed ground stations provided the location information on the Transit satellite orbit. Locating a Transit satellite in earth orbit from a known ground station using the Doppler shift is simply the reverse of using the known location of the satellite in orbit to locate an unknown location on the earth, again using the Doppler shift.

A typical ground station occupied a small Quonset hut. The accuracy of the ground station measurements was a function of the ground station master clock accuracy. Initially a quartz oscillator in a temperature controlled oven was used as the master clock. The master clock was checked daily for drift using a VLF receiver tuned to a US Navy VLF station. The VLF signal had the property that the phase of the VLF signal did not change from day to day at noon along the path between the transmitter and the receiver and thus could be used to measure oscillator drift. Later rubidium and cesium beam clocks were used. Ground stations had number names; for example, Station 019 was McMurdo Station, Antarctica. For many years during the 1970s this station was staffed by a graduate student and an undergraduate student, typically in electrical engineering, from the University of Texas at Austin. Other stations were located at New Mexico State University, the University of Texas at Austin, Sicily, Japan, Seychelles Island, Thule Greenland and a number of other locations. The Greenland and Antarctica stations saw every pass of every Transit satellite because of their near pole location for these polar orbiting satellites.

=== Portable Geoceiver ===
A portable version of the ground station was called a Geoceiver and was used to make field measurements. This receiver, power supply, punched tape unit, and antennas could fit in a number of padded aluminum cases and could be shipped as extra cargo on an airline. Data was taken over a period of time, typically a week, and sent back to the Satellite Control Center for processing. Therefore, unlike GPS, there was not an immediate accurate location of the Geoceiver location. A Geoceiver was permanently located at the South Pole Station and operated by United States Geological Survey personnel. Since it was located on the surface of a moving ice sheet, its data was used to measure the ice sheet movement. Other Geoceivers were taken out in the field in Antarctica during the summer and were used to measure locations, for example the movement of the Ross Ice Shelf.

=== The AN/UYK-1 (TRW-130) Computer ===
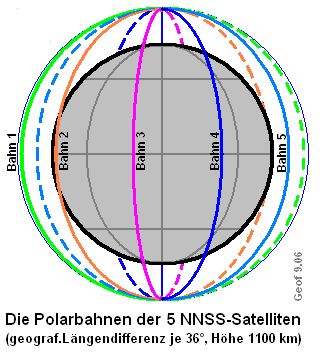
Orbits of the five Transit Satellites (text in German.)

Since no computer small enough to fit through a submarine's hatch existed (in 1958), a new computer was designed, named the AN/UYK-1 (TRW-130). It was built with rounded corners to fit through the hatch and was about five feet tall and sealed to be waterproof. The principal design engineer was then-UCLA-faculty-member Lowell Amdahl, brother of Gene Amdahl. The AN/UYK-1 was built by the Ramo-Wooldridge Corporation (later TRW) for the Lafayette class SSBNs. It was equipped with 8,192 words of 15-bit core memory plus parity bit, threaded by hand at their Canoga Park factory. Cycle time was about one microsecond. The AN/UYK-1 weighed about 550 pounds (250 kg).

The AN/UYK-1 was a microprogrammed machine with a 15-bit word length that lacked hardware commands to subtract, multiply or divide, but could add, shift, form ones' complement, and test the carry bit. Instructions to perform standard fixed and floating point operations were software subroutines and programs were lists of links and operators to those subroutines. For example, the "subtract" subroutine had to form the ones' complement of the subtrahend and add it. Multiplication required successive shifting and conditional adding.

In the AN/UYK-1 instruction set, the machine-language instructions had two operators that could simultaneously manipulate the arithmetic registers – for example, complementing the contents of one register while loading or storing another. It may have been the first computer that implemented a single-cycle indirect addressing ability.

During a satellite pass, a GE receiver would receive the orbital parameters and encrypted messages from the satellite, as well as measure the Doppler-shifted frequency at intervals and provide this data to the AN/UYK-1 computer. The computer would also receive from the ship's inertial navigation system (SINS) a reading of latitude and longitude. Using this information the AN/UYK-1 ran an algorithm that provided a location reading in about fifteen minutes.

== Other satellites ==
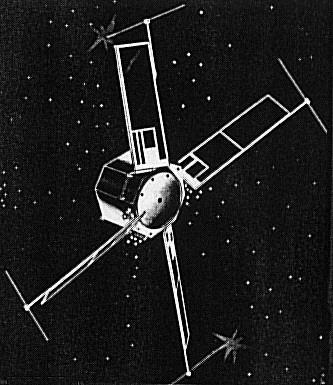
Transit 5E1

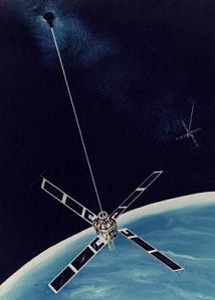
Transit-O (Operational) navigation satellite

There were 41 satellites in the Transit series that were assigned the Transit name by NASA.

Transit 3B demonstrated uploading programs into the onboard computer's memory while in orbit.

Transit 4A, launched June 29, 1961, was the first satellite to use a radioactive power source (RTG) (a SNAP-3). Transit 4B (1961) also had a SNAP-3 RTG. Transit 4B was among several satellites which were inadvertently damaged or destroyed in a nuclear explosion, specifically the United States Starfish Prime high-altitude nuclear test on July 9, 1962 and subsequent radiation belt.

Transit 5A3 used batteries powered by solar arrays and Transit 5BN-1 (1963) had a SNAP-9A RTG.

Transit 5B-2 (1963) had a SNAP-9A RTG.

In 1964, a rocket failed to boost Transit 5BN-3 with a SNAP-9A RTG into orbit. It "burned up during re-entry and ablated into small particles" together with its approximately 1 kilogram of Plutonium-238.

Transit 5B-5 resumed communicating again after an extended period of inactivity (a zombie satellite).

Transit-9 and 5B4 (1964) and Transit-5B7 and 5B6 (1965) each had "a nuclear power source".

The US Air Force also periodically launched short lived satellites equipped with radio beacons of 162 MHz and 324 MHz at much lower orbits to study orbital drag. The Transit ground tracking stations tracked these satellites as well, locating the satellites within their orbits using the same principles. The satellite location data was used to collect orbital drag data, including variations in the upper atmosphere and the Earth's gravitational field.

Beacon Explorer-A and Beacon Explorer-B also carried Transit-compatible transmitters.

== Transit satellites ==
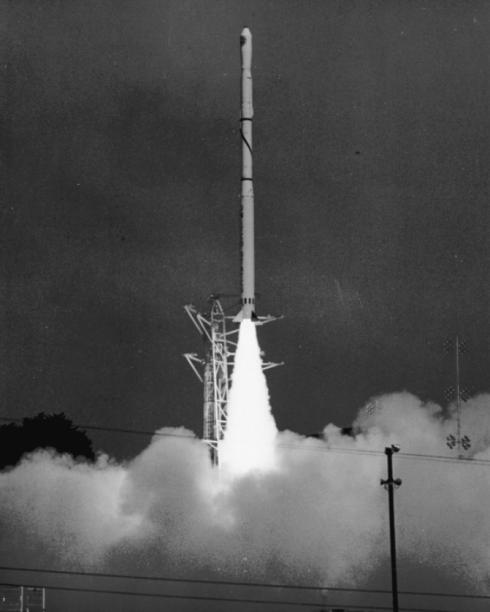
Transit satellite launched in October 1973

List of Transit satellites:

- Transit 1A (17.09.1959, launch failure)
- Transit 1B (13.04.1960)
- Transit 2A (22.06.1960)
- Transit 2B (not launched)
- Transit 3A (30.11.1960, launch failure)
- Transit 3B (22.02.1961)
- Transit 4A (29.06.1961)
- Transit 4B (15.11.1961)
- Transit 5A 1 (19.12.1962)
- Transit 5A 2 (05.04.1963, launch failure)
- Transit 5A 3 (16.06.1963)
- Transit 5BN 1 and Transit 5E-1 (28.09.1963)
- Transit 5BN 2 and Transit 5E-3 (05.12.1963)
- Transit 5BN 3 and Transit 5E-2 (21.04.1964, launch failure)
- Transit 5C 1 (04.06.1964)
- Transit 5C 2 (not launched)
- Transit 5E-4 (cancelled)
- Transit 5E-5 and Transit-O 1 to 32 (1964 to 1988)

Other Transit navigation satellites:

- Triad 1 / TIP 1 (1972)
- Triad 2 and 3 (1975/6)
- Nova 1 to 3 (1981 to 1984)
- Transat (1977)

== See also ==
- Transit satellite launch record
