= Thor (rocket family) =

American rocket family

Thor was a US space launch vehicle derived from the PGM-17 Thor intermediate-range ballistic missile. The Thor rocket was the first member of the Delta rocket family of space launch vehicles. The last launch of a direct derivative of the Thor missile occurred in 2018 as the first stage of the final Delta II.

== Thor-Able ==
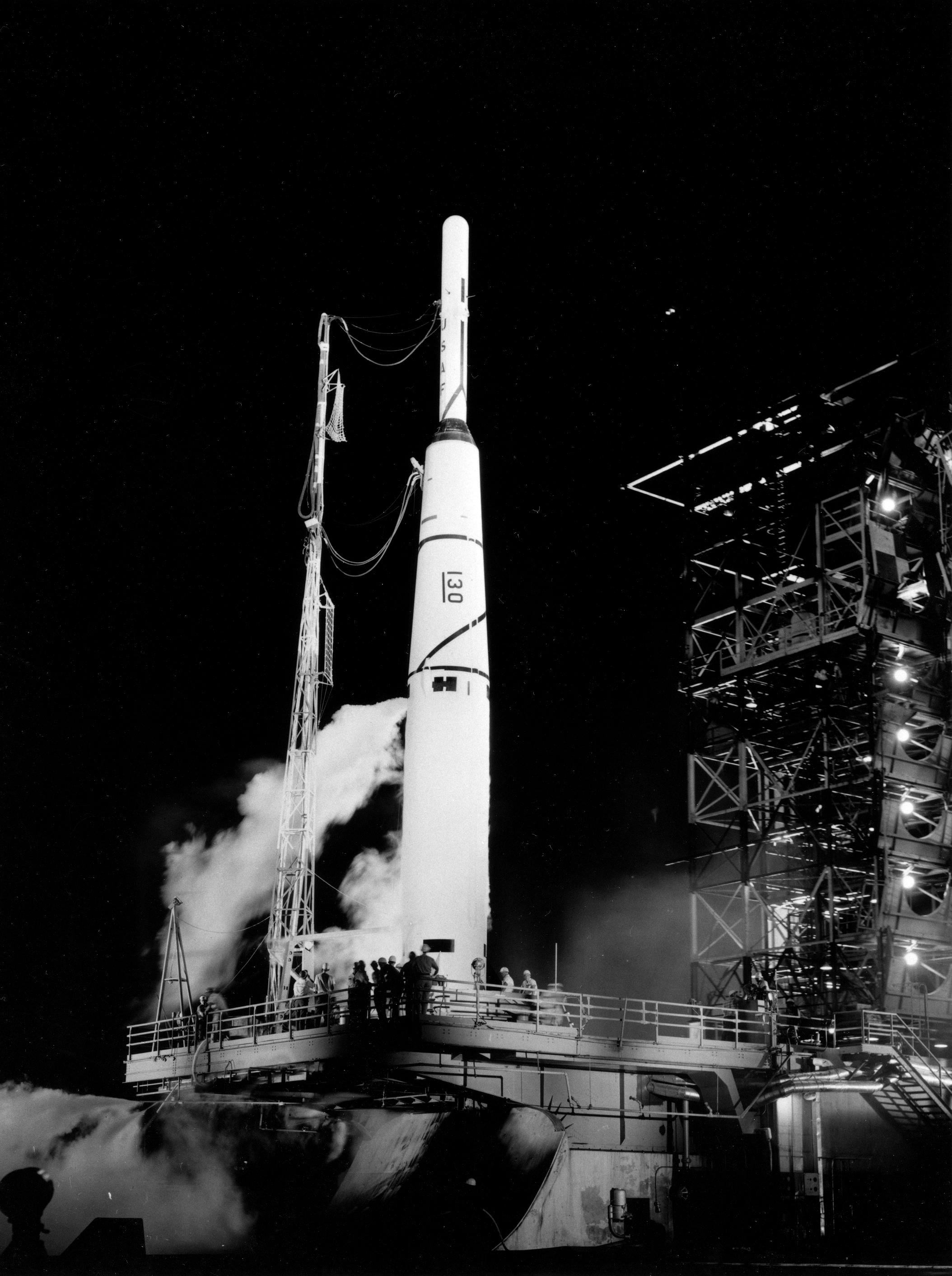
Thor-Able with Pioneer 1 at Cape Canaveral in Florida

Thor was first used as a launch vehicle during the testing program of the warhead reentry vehicle for the Atlas missile. For these three tests a Thor core stage was topped by the Able second stage. Able used the Aerojet AJ-10-40 engine from the Vanguard second stage. The first such launch, 116, was lost on 23 April 1958 due to a turbopump failure in the main engine. The recovery of the reentry vehicles on the succeeding two attempts were not successful. Three mice, one on each vehicle, died in these tests.

The Able stage from the Atlas reentry vehicle tests was upgraded to become the Able I with a third stage consisting of an unguided Altair X-248 solid-fuel rocket motor. A Thor Able I was used in an attempt to place the 84 lb (38 kg) Pioneer 0 spacecraft into lunar orbit where it would take pictures of the lunar surface with a TV camera. The mission ended prematurely at 73.6 seconds after launch on 17 August 1958 due to a turbopump failure.

On 7 August 1959, a Thor-Able was used to successfully launch Explorer 6, the first satellite to transmit pictures of Earth taken from orbit.

=== Ablestar ===
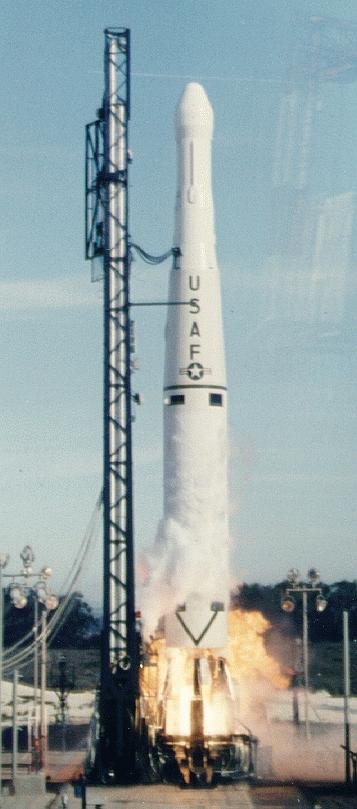
Thor-Ablestar with Transit VBN-2 (December 1963)

Ablestar was a liquid-propellant rocket stage burning hypergolic propellants fed from gas-pressurized propellant tanks. It was used as the upper stage, and provided improved performance. On 13 April 1960, a Thor-Ablestar launched Transit 1B, the first experimental satellite of what eventually became the Global Navigation Satellite System. On 22 June 1960, a Thor-Ablestar launched the first Galactic Radiation and Background (GRAB) electronic intelligence (ELINT) satellite for the United States Navy. These now-declassified satellites operated under a cover story of providing solar radiation data and included an electronics package to detect Soviet air defense radar signals. GRAB-1 was the world's first successful reconnaissance satellite, preceding the first Corona mission to return film (Discoverer 14 on August 18) by almost two months. On 29 June 1961, the Ablestar stage used to launch Transit 4A, which became the first object to unintentionally explode in space, creating at least 294 trackable pieces of space debris.

=== Thor-Delta ===
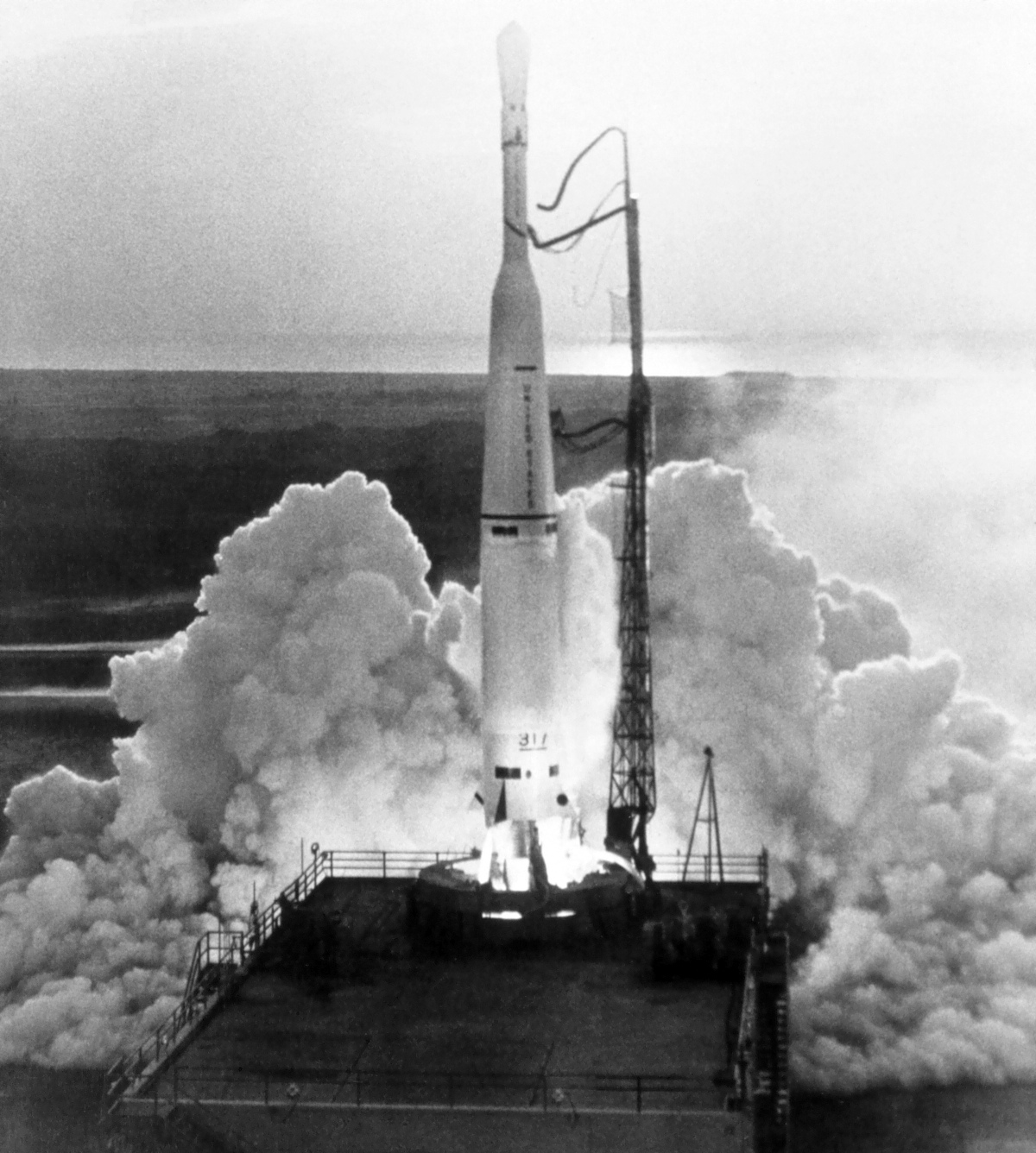
Thor-Delta with Tiros 4 (February 1962)

The Delta second stage was derived from the Able second stage. Members of the Delta rocket family derived from the Thor-Delta continued to launch satellites and space probes until the family was retired in 2024.

By 1969, the Thor core was being used regularly both in Delta vehicles and in the USAF Standard Space Launch Vehicle (SLV-2), with thrust augmentation and a variety of upper stages.

== Thor-Agena ==
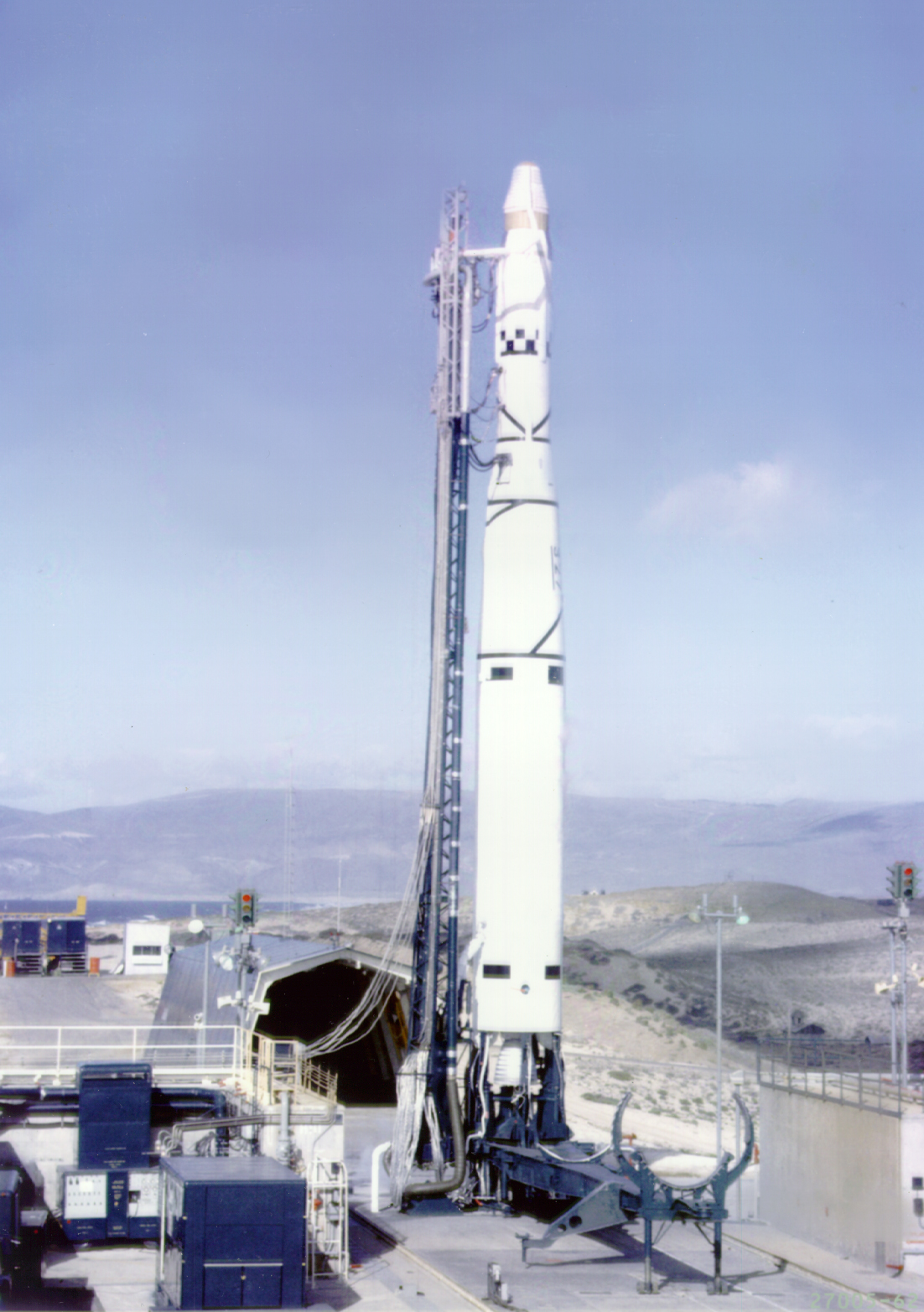
Thor-Agena B with Discoverer 37 on launch pad (January 1962).

Together with the Agena upper stage, Thor was the booster of the Thor-Agena vehicle used to launch the early Corona (also known as "Keyhole" and "Discoverer") satellites from Vandenberg AFB. These were the first photographic spy satellites, used for photographic surveillance of the Soviet Union, China and other areas. Thor-Agenas were used as launch vehicles for Corona satellites from June 1959 through May 1963.

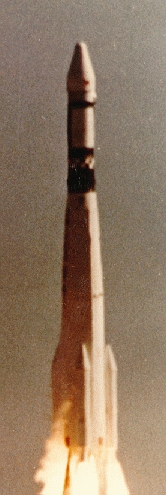
Thrust Augmented Thor (TAT) / Thor SLV-2A Agena D

The Thrust Augmented Thor (TAT) was developed to handle the growing satellites of the Corona program. It added three Castor solid-fuel rocket strapon boosters—each providing 53,000 lbf (236 kN) thrust—to the standard Thor core stage. The boosters were lit on the ground and jettisoned after burnout.

The Thrust-Augmented Long Tank Thor/Agena incorporated modifications allowing 49,000 lb (22,000 kg) more propellant and was capable of sending payloads ranging from 1400 to about 2800 pounds into 100-nautical-mile (190 km) polar circular orbits.

=== Thorad-Agena ===
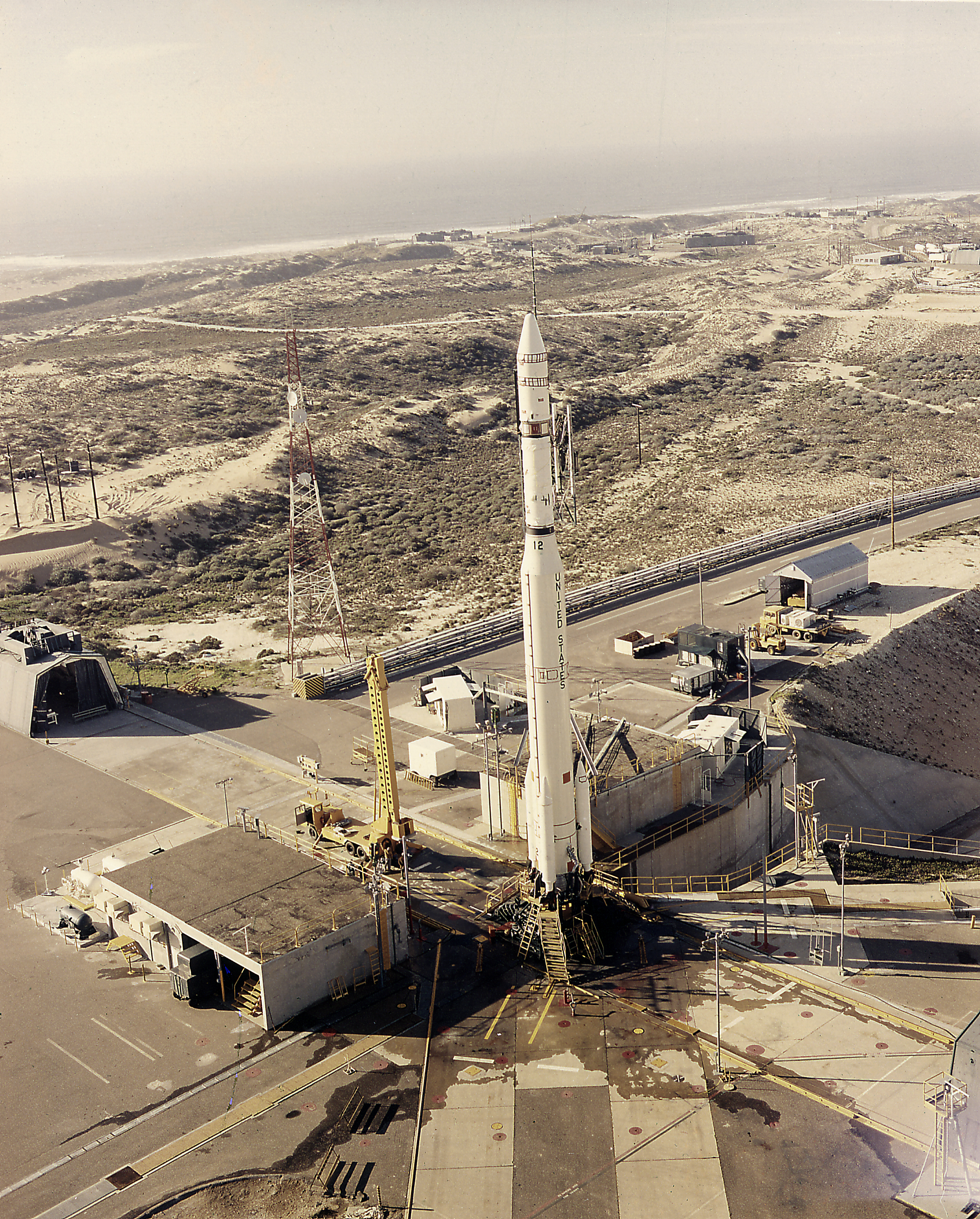
Thorad-Agena D with SERT-2 satellite at Space Launch Complex 2 East (SLC-2E), Vandenberg AFB, California.

The Thorad-Agena (pictured) was developed from Thor. It used a Long Tank Thor to launch an Agena-D upper stage.

== See also ==
- Comparison of orbital launchers families
- Comparison of orbital launch systems
- List of Thor-Able launches
- List of Thor-Ablestar launches
