= List of Thor-Able launches =

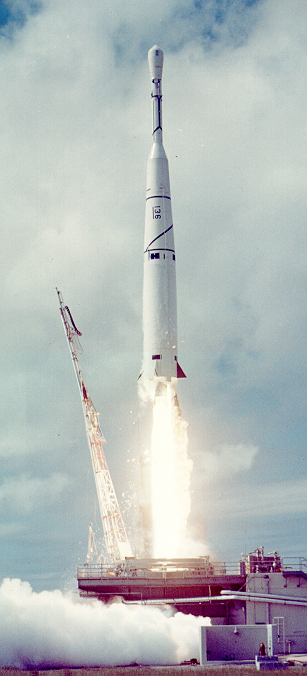
- Launch of the Transit 1A satellite on a Thor-Able II
- Function: Expendable launch system Sounding rocket
- Manufacturer: Douglas/Aerojet
- Country of origin: United States

Size
- Height: 26.9 metres (88 ft) – 27.8 metres (91 ft)
- Diameter: 2.44 metres (8 ft 0 in)
- Mass: 51,608 kilograms (113,776 lb)
- Stages: 2–3

Capacity

Payload to 640km LEO
- Mass: 120 kilograms (260 lb)

Associated rockets
- Family: Thor
- Derivative work: Thor-Ablestar; Delta
- Comparable: Luna

Launch history
- Launch sites: LC-17A, Canaveral
- Total launches: 16
- Success(es): 10
- Failure: 6
- First flight: 24 April 1958
- Last flight: 1 April 1960
- Carries passengers or cargo: Pioneer; Transit; Tiros

First stage – Thor
- Powered by: 1 LR79-7
- Maximum thrust: 758.71 kilonewtons (170,560 lbf)
- Specific impulse: 282 seconds (2.77 km/s)
- Burn time: 165 seconds
- Propellant: RP-1/LOX

Second stage – Able
- Powered by: 1 AJ-10
- Maximum thrust: 34.69 kilonewtons (7,800 lbf)
- Specific impulse: 270 seconds (2.6 km/s)
- Burn time: 115 seconds
- Propellant: HNO_{3}/UDMH

Third stage (optional) – Altair
- Powered by: 1 X-248
- Maximum thrust: 12.45 kilonewtons (2,800 lbf)
- Specific impulse: 256 seconds (2.51 km/s)
- Burn time: 38 seconds
- Propellant: Solid

The Thor-Able (Thor DM-18-Able) was an American expendable launch system and sounding rocket used for a series of re-entry vehicle tests and satellite launches between 1958 and 1960. It was a two-stage rocket, consisting of a Thor IRBM as a first stage and a Vanguard-derived Able second stage. On some flights, an Altair solid rocket motor was added as a third stage. It was a member of the Thor family and an early predecessor of the Delta.

== Launch statistics ==
=== Rocket configurations ===
- Thor DM-18 Able
- Thor DM-18 Able I
- Thor DM-18 Able II
- Thor DM-18 Able III
- Thor DM-18 Able IV

=== Launch outcome ===
- Success
- Failure

=== Orbit ===
- Suborbital
- High altitude
- HEO
- LEO
- Heliocentric
- SSO

=== Function ===
- RTV test
- Lunar Orbit
- RVX test
- Radiation
- Navigation
- Scientific
- Weather

== Launch history ==
The date in this table comes from
Date/Time (GMT)	Rocket	S/N	Launch site	Payload	Function	Orbit	Outcome	Remarks
1958-04-24; 00:10	Thor DM-18 Able	Thor 116	CCAFS LC-17A		RTV test	Suborbital	Failure	Maiden flight of Thor-Able. Turbopump failure T+146 seconds.
1958-07-10; 15:06	Thor DM-18 Able	Thor 118	CCAFS LC-17A		RTV test	Suborbital	Success	
1958-07-23; 22:13	Thor DM-18 Able	Thor 119	CCAFS LC-17A		RTV test	Suborbital	Success	Biological nose cone containing a mouse. The nose cone sank into the ocean and was not recovered.
1958-08-17; 12:18	Thor DM-18 Able-I	Thor 127	CCAFS LC-17A	Pioneer 0	Lunar orbiter	High Altitude	Failure	Maiden flight of Thor-Able I. First use of a Thor-based vehicle for an orbital launch. Turbopump failure, T+73,6 seconds.
1958-10-11; 08:42:13	Thor DM-18 Able-I	Thor 130	CCAFS LC-17A	Pioneer 1	Lunar orbiter	High Altitude	Failure	Third stage underperformed
1958-11-08; 08:42:13	Thor DM-18 Able-I	Thor 129	CCAFS LC-17A	Pioneer 2	Lunar orbiter	High Altitude	Failure	Third stage failed to ignite
1959-01-23	Thor DM-18 Able-II	Thor 128	CCAFS LC-17A		RVX test	Suborbital	Failure	Thor portion of flight successful. Staging failed due to an electrical malfunction. Vehicle fell into the Atlantic Ocean.
1959-02-28; 07:58	Thor DM-18 Able-II	Thor 131	CCAFS LC-17A		RVX test	Suborbital	Success	
1959-03-21; 06:19	Thor DM-18 Able-II	Thor 132	CCAFS LC-17A		RVX test	Suborbital	Success	
1959-04-08; 06:35	Thor DM-18 Able-II	Thor 133	CCAFS LC-17A		RVX test	Suborbital	Success	
1959-05-21; 06:40	Thor DM-18 Able-II	Thor 135	CCAFS LC-17A		RVX test	Suborbital	Success	
1959-06-11; 06:44	Thor DM-18 Able-II	Thor 137	CCAFS LC-17A		RVX test	Suborbital	Success	
1959-08-07; 14:24:20	Thor DM-18 Able-III	Thor 134	CCAFS LC-17A	Explorer 6	Radiation	HEO	Success	
1959-09-17; 14:34	Thor DM-18 Able-II	Thor 136	CCAFS LC-17A	Transit 1A	Navigation	LEO	Failure	Third stage malfunctioned
1960-03-11; 13:00	Thor DM-18 Able-IV	Thor 219	CCAFS LC 17A	Pioneer 5	Scientific	Heliocentric	Success	Only flight of Thor-Able IV
1960-04-01; 11:40:09	Thor DM-18 Able-II	Thor 148	CCAFS LC-17A	TIROS-1	Weather	SSO	Success	Final flight of Thor-Able

== See also ==
- List of Thor and Delta launches
- List of Thor and Delta launches (1957-1959)
- List of Thor and Delta launches (1960-1969)
- List of Thor DM-18 Agena-A launches
- Thor (rocket family)
- Thor DM-19 Delta
