= Lists of Thor and Delta launches =

This is a list of launches made by the PGM-17 Thor IRBM, and its derivatives, including the Delta family and the Japanese N-I, N-II and H-I rockets which were based on license-produced components.

== List of Thor and Delta launches (by year) ==
Due to the number of launches, it has been split by decade:

- List of Thor and Delta launches (1957–1959)
- List of Thor and Delta launches (1960–1969)
- List of Thor and Delta launches (1970–1979)
- List of Thor and Delta launches (1980–1989)
- List of Thor and Delta launches (1990–1999)
- List of Thor and Delta launches (2000–2009)
- List of Thor and Delta launches (2010–2019)
- List of Thor and Delta launches (2020–2024)

== List of Thor and Delta launches (by rocket type) ==
Launch lists for selected rocket types:

- List of Thor DM-18A launches
- List of Thor DM-18 Able launches
- List of Thor-Agena launches
- List of Thor DM-18 Agena-A launches
- List of Thor DM-21 Agena-B launches
- List of Thor DM-21 Agena-D launches
- List of Delta DM-19 launches
- List of Delta 1 launches
- List of Delta II launches
- List of Delta III launches
- List of Delta IV launches
  - List of Delta IV Medium launches
  - List of Delta IV Heavy launches

Launch lists based on outcome:

- List of failed Thor and Delta launches

== Launch outcome statistics ==
- Failure
- Partial Failure
- Success

== See also ==
- List of Falcon 9 and Falcon Heavy launches
- List of Atlas launches
- List of Titan launches
