= List of Thor and Delta launches (1957–1959) =

Between 1957 and 1959, there were 79 Thor missiles launched, of which 51 were successful, giving a 64.5% success rate.

== Launch statistics ==
=== Rocket configurations ===
- Thor DM
- Thor-Agena

=== Launch sites ===
- Cape Canaveral LC-17A
- Cape Canaveral LC-17B
- Cape Canaveral LC-18B
- Vandenberg LC-75
- Arguello LC-1-1 (Vandenberg SLC-3)

=== Launch outcomes ===
- Success
- Partial Failure
- Failure

== 1957 ==
There were 9 Thor missiles launched in 1957. 4 of the 9 launches were successful, giving a 44.4% success rate.

| Date/Time (UTC) | Rocket | S/N | Launch site | Payload | Function | Orbit | Outcome | Remarks |
|---|---|---|---|---|---|---|---|---|
| 1957-01-26 | Thor DM-18 | Thor 101 | CCAFS LC-17B | | Missile test | Suborbital | Failure | Maiden flight of Thor, first launch from LC-17. Contaminated LOX caused loss of thrust at liftoff. Vehicle fell back onto the pad and exploded. |
| 1957-04-20; 04:33 | Thor DM-18 | Thor 102 | CCAFS LC-17B | | Missile test | Suborbital | Failure | RSO sent a mistaken destruct command at T+35 seconds due to an incorrect console readout. |
| 1957-08-30 | Thor DM-18 | Thor 104 | CCAFS LC-17A | | Missile test | Suborbital | Failure | First launch from LC-17A. Control malfunction led to missile breakup at T+92 seconds. |
| 1957-09-20 | Thor DM-18 | Thor 105 | CCAFS LC-17B | | Missile test | Suborbital | Success | |
| 1957-10-03; 17:14 | Thor DM-18 | Thor 107 | CCAFS LC-17A | | Missile test | Suborbital | Failure | Stuck valve prevented the gas generator from starting. Missile fell back onto the pad and exploded. |
| 1957-10-11; 16:33 | Thor DM-18 | Thor 108 | CCAFS LC-17B | | Missile test | Suborbital | Failure | Turbopump failure at T+152 seconds. Flight considered a "partial success". |
| 1957-10-24; 16:32 | Thor DM-18 | Thor 109 | CCAFS LC-17A | | Missile test | Suborbital | Success | |
| 1957-12-07; 22:11 | Thor DM-18 | Thor 112 | CCAFS LC-17B | | Missile test | Suborbital | Success | |
| 1957-12-19; 20:12 | Thor DM-18 | Thor 113 | CCAFS LC-17A | | Missile test | Suborbital | Success | |

== 1958 ==
There were 20 Thor missiles launched in 1958. 8 of the 20 launches were successful, giving a 40% success rate.

| Date/Time (GMT) | Rocket | S/N | Launch site | Payload | Function | Orbit | Outcome | Remarks |
|---|---|---|---|---|---|---|---|---|
| 1958-01-28; 20:16 | Thor DM-18 | Thor 114 | CCAFS LC-17A | | Missile test | Suborbital | Failure | Electrical malfunction led to control failure. RSO T+152 seconds. |
| 1958-02-28; 13:08 | Thor DM-18 | Thor 120 | CCAFS LC-17B | | Missile test | Suborbital | Failure | Premature engine shutdown at T+109 seconds. |
| 1958-04-19; 13:30 | Thor DM-18 | Thor 121 | CCAFS LC-17B | | Missile test | Suborbital | Failure | Missile lost thrust and fell back onto the pad, exploding. Suspected fuel line obstruction. |
| 1958-04-24; 00:10 | Thor DM-18 Able | Thor 116 | CCAFS LC-17A | | RTV test | Suborbital | Failure | Maiden flight of Thor-Able. Turbopump failure T+146 seconds. |
| 1958-06-04; 21:17 | Thor DM-18 | Thor 115 | CCAFS LC-18B | | Missile test | Suborbital | Success | First launch from LC-18B |
| 1958-06-13; 15:06 | Thor DM-18 | Thor 122 | CCAFS LC-17B | | Missile test | Suborbital | Success | |
| 1958-07-10; 15:06 | Thor DM-18 Able | Thor 118 | CCAFS LC-17A | | RTV test | Suborbital | Success | |
| 1958-07-13; 06:36 | Thor DM-18 | Thor 123 | CCAFS LC-17B | | Missile test | Suborbital | Success | Performance was normal through the boost phase, but the BECO and warhead separation signals were never received. |
| 1958-07-23; 22:13 | Thor DM-18 Able | Thor 119 | CCAFS LC-17A | | RTV test | Suborbital | Success | Biological nose cone containing a mouse. The nose cone sank into the ocean and was not recovered. |
| 1958-07-26; 06:40 | Thor DM-18 | Thor 126 | CCAFS LC-17B | | Missile test | Suborbital | Failure | LOX valve malfunction led to loss of thrust and vehicle breakup at T+55 seconds |
| 1958-08-06 | Thor DM-18 | Thor 117 | CCAFS LC-18B | | Missile test | Suborbital | Success | Final flight of Thor DM-18 missile |
| 1958-08-17; 12:18 | Thor DM-18 Able-I | Thor 127 | CCAFS LC-17A | Pioneer 0 | Lunar orbiter | High Altitude | Failure | Maiden flight of Thor-Able I. First use of a Thor-based vehicle for an orbital launch. Turbopump failure, T+73,6 seconds. |
| 1958-10-11; 08:42:13 | Thor DM-18 Able-I | Thor 130 | CCAFS LC-17A | Pioneer 1 | Lunar orbiter | High Altitude | Failure | Third stage underperformed |
| 1958-11-05; 08:53 | Thor DM-18A | Thor 138 | CCAFS LC-17B | | Missile test | Suborbital | Failure | Maiden flight of Thor DM-18A. Flight control failure. RSO T+45 seconds. |
| 1958-11-08; 08:42:13 | Thor DM-18 Able-I | Thor 129 | CCAFS LC-17A | Pioneer 2 | Lunar orbiter | High Altitude | Failure | Third stage failed to ignite |
| 1958-11-26; 09:09 | Thor DM-18A | Thor 140 | CCAFS LC-17B | | Missile test | Suborbital | Partial failure | Loss of guidance system power caused the missile to overshoot its target point by 22 miles. |
| 1958-12-06; 00:41 | Thor DM-18A | Thor 145 | CCAFS LC-18B | | Missile test | Suborbital | Partial failure | LOX tank pressurization failure led to loss of thrust. Missile impacted 20 miles short of the target point. |
| 1958-12-16; 23:44:45 | Thor DM-18A | Thor 151 | VAFB LC-75-1-1 | | Missile test | Suborbital | Success | First Thor launch from Vandenberg AFB |
| 1958-12-17; 04:00 | Thor DM-18A | Thor 146 | CCAFS LC-17B | | Missile test | Suborbital | Success | |
| 1958-12-31; 02:00 | Thor DM-18A | Thor 138 | CCAFS LC-18B | | Missile test | Suborbital | Failure | Flight control failure. RSO T+40 seconds. |

== 1959 ==
There were 50 Thor missiles launched in 1959. 39 of the 50 launches were successful, giving a 78% success rate.

| Date/Time (UTC) | Rocket | S/N | Launch site | Payload | Function | Orbit | Outcome | Remarks |
|---|---|---|---|---|---|---|---|---|
| 1959-01-23 | Thor DM-18 Able-II | Thor 128 | CCAFS LC-17A | | RVX test | Suborbital | Failure | Thor portion of flight successful. Staging failed due to an electrical malfunction. Vehicle fell into the Atlantic Ocean. |
| 1959-01-30; 23:53 | Thor DM-18A | Thor 154 | CCAFS LC-17B | | Missile test | Suborbital | Success | |
| 1959-02-28; 07:58 | Thor DM-18 Able-II | Thor 131 | CCAFS LC-17A | | RVX test | Suborbital | Success | |
| 1959-02-28; 21:49:16 | Thor DM-18 Agena-A | Thor 163; Agena 1022 | VAFB LC-75-3-4 | Discoverer 1 | Reconnaissance | LEO | Failure | Maiden flight of Thor-Agena. Agena telemetry lost T+730 seconds. Fate of the payload unknown, but generally presumed to have impacted somewhere in Antarctica. |
| 1959-03-21; 06:19 | Thor DM-18 Able-II | Thor 132 | CCAFS LC-17A | | RVX test | Suborbital | Success | |
| 1959-03-22; 00:58 | Thor DM-18A | Thor 158 | CCAFS LC-18B | | Missile test | Suborbital | Success | |
| 1959-03-27; 04:02 | Thor DM-18A | Thor 162 | CCAFS LC-17B | | Missile test | Suborbital | Success | |
| 1959-04-08; 06:35 | Thor DM-18 Able-II | Thor 133 | CCAFS LC-17A | | RVX test | Suborbital | Success | |
| 1959-04-13; 21:18:39 | Thor DM-18 Agena-A | Thor 170; Agena 1018 | VAFB LC-75-3-4 | Discoverer 2 | Reconnaissance | LEO | Success | |
| 1959-04-16; 20:46 | Thor DM-18A | Thor 161 | VAFB LC-75-2-8 | | Missile test | Suborbital | Success | |
| 1959-04-23; 05:30 | Thor DM-18A | Thor 176 | CCAFS LC-17B | | Missile test | Suborbital | Success | |
| 1959-04-25; 05:00 | Thor DM-18A | Thor 164 | CCAFS LC-18B | | Missile test | Suborbital | Success | |
| 1959-05-12; 17:35 | Thor DM-18A | Thor 187 | CCAFS LC-17B | | Missile test | Suborbital | Success | |
| 1959-05-21; 06:40 | Thor DM-18 Able-II | Thor 135 | CCAFS LC-17A | | RVX test | Suborbital | Success | |
| 1959-05-23; 02:42 | Thor DM-18A | Thor 184 | CCAFS LC-18B | | Missile test | Suborbital | Success | |
| 1959-06-03; 20:09:20 | Thor DM-18 Agena-A | Thor 174; Agena 1020 | VAFB LC-75-3-4 | Discoverer 3 | Reconnaissance | LEO | Failure | Agena attitude control malfunction pointed the stage in the wrong direction, sending it into the Pacific Ocean rather than orbit. |
| 1959-06-11; 06:44 | Thor DM-18 Able-II | Thor 137 | CCAFS LC-17A | | RVX test | Suborbital | Success | |
| 1959-06-16; 21:45 | Thor DM-18A | Thor 191 | VAFB LC-75-2-7 | | Missile test | Suborbital | Failure | Pitch and roll program failed to initiate. RSO T+50 seconds. |
| 1959-06-25; 22:47:45 | Thor DM-18 Agena-A | Thor 179; Agena 1023 | VAFB LC-75-3-5 | Discoverer 4 | Reconnaissance | LEO | Failure | Agena developed insufficient thrust to attain orbital velocity. |
| 1959-06-26 | Thor DM-18A | Thor 198 | CCAFS LC-18B | | Missile test | Suborbital | Success | |
| 1959-06-30; 02:37 | Thor DM-18A | Thor 194 | CCAFS LC-17B | | Missile test | Suborbital | Success | |
| 1959-07-21; 07:33 | Thor DM-18A | Thor 203 | CCAFS LC-17B | | Missile test | Suborbital | Failure | Pitch and roll program failed to initiate. RSO T+40 seconds. |
| 1959-07-24; 12:47 | Thor DM-18A | Thor 202 | CCAFS LC-18B | | Missile test | Suborbital | Success | |
| 1959-08-03; 21:41 | Thor DM-18A | Thor 175 | VAFB LC-75-1-1 | | Missile test | Suborbital | Success | |
| 1959-08-06; 02:48 | Thor DM-18A | Thor 208 | CCAFS LC-17B | | Missile test | Suborbital | Success | |
| 1959-08-07; 14:24:20 | Thor DM-18 Able-III | Thor 134 | CCAFS LC-17A | Explorer 6 | Radiation | HEO | Success | |
| 1959-08-13; 19:00:08 | Thor DM-18 Agena-A | Thor 192; Agena 1029 | VAFB LC-75-3-4 | Discoverer 5 | Reconnaissance | LEO | Success | |
| 1959-08-14; 09:00 | Thor DM-18A | Thor 204 | CCAFS LC-18B | | Missile test | Suborbital | Success | |
| 1959-08-14; 19:36:04 | Thor DM-18A | Thor 190 | VAFB LC-75-2-6 | | Missile test | Suborbital | Partial failure | Premature propellant depletion. Planned range not achieved. |
| 1959-08-19; 19:24:44 | Thor DM-18 Agena-A | Thor 200; Agena 1028 | VAFB LC-75-3-5 | Discoverer 6 | Reconnaissance | LEO | Success | |
| 1959-08-27; 12:30 | Thor DM-18A | Thor 216 | CCAFS LC-17B | | Missile test | Suborbital | Success | |
| 1959-09-12 | Thor DM-18A | Thor 217 | CCAFS LC-18B | | Missile test | Suborbital | Success | |
| 1959-09-17; 14:34 | Thor DM-18 Able-II | Thor 136 | CCAFS LC-17A | Transit 1A | Navigation | LEO | Failure | Third stage malfunctioned |
| 1959-09-17; 21:09 | Thor DM-18A | Thor 228 | VAFB LC-75-1-2 | | Missile test | Suborbital | Success | |
| 1959-09-22; 18:00 | Thor DM-18A | Thor 222 | CCAFS LC-17B | | Missile test | Suborbital | Success | |
| 1959-10-06; 16:41 | Thor DM-18A | Thor 235 | CCAFS LC-18B | | Missile test | Suborbital | Success | |
| 1959-10-06; 18:26 | Thor DM-18A | Thor 239 | VAFB LC-75-2-8 | | Missile test | Suborbital | Success | |
| 1959-10-14; 04:15 | Thor DM-18A | Thor 221 | CCAFS LC-17B | | Missile test | Suborbital | Success | |
| 1959-10-21; 22:57 | Thor DM-18A | Thor 220 | VAFB LC-75-1-1 | | Missile test | Suborbital | Success | |
| 1959-10-29; 02:12 | Thor DM-18A | Thor 230 | CCAFS LC-18B | | Missile test | Suborbital | Success | |
| 1959-11-03 | Thor DM-18A | Thor 238 | CCAFS LC-17B | | Missile test | Suborbital | Success | |
| 1959-11-07; 20:28:41 | Thor DM-18 Agena-A | Thor 206; Agena 1051 | VAFB LC-75-3-4 | Discoverer 7 | Reconnaissance | LEO | Success | |
| 1959-11-12; 19:24 | Thor DM-18A | Thor 181 | VAFB LC-75-1-2 | | Missile test | Suborbital | Success | |
| 1959-11-19 | Thor DM-18A | Thor 244 | CCAFS LC-17B | | Missile test | Suborbital | Success | |
| 1959-11-20; 19:25:24 | Thor DM-18 Agena-A | Thor 212; Agena 1050 | VAFB LC-75-3-5 | Discoverer 8 | Reconnaissance | LEO | Failure | Orbit too eccentric for use of return capsule |
| 1959-12-01; 17:00 | Thor DM-18A | Thor 254 | CCAFS LC-18B | | Missile test | Suborbital | Success | |
| 1959-12-02; 05:29 | Thor DM-18A | Thor 265 | VAFB LC-75-1-1 | | Missile test | Suborbital | Failure | |
| 1959-12-15; 02:14 | Thor DM-18A | Thor 185 | VAFB LC-75-1-2 | | Missile test | Suborbital | Failure | Flight control failure. Missile broke up T+60 seconds. |
| 1959-12-17 | Thor DM-18A | Thor 255 | CCAFS LC-17B | | Missile test | Suborbital | Success | |

== Images ==
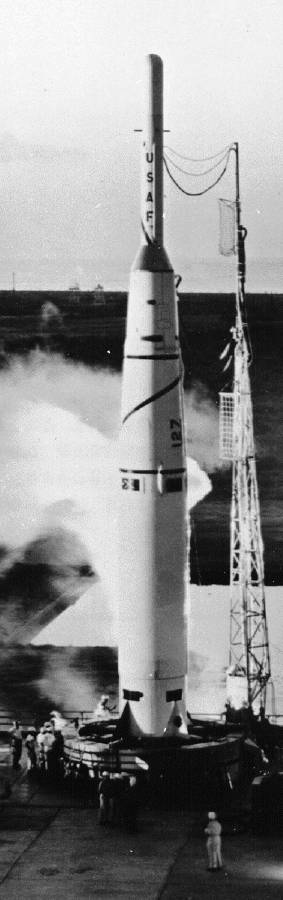
Thor 127

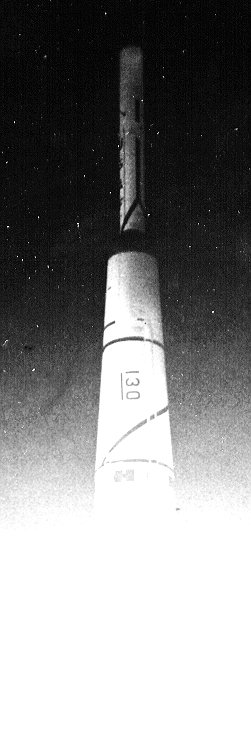
Thor 130

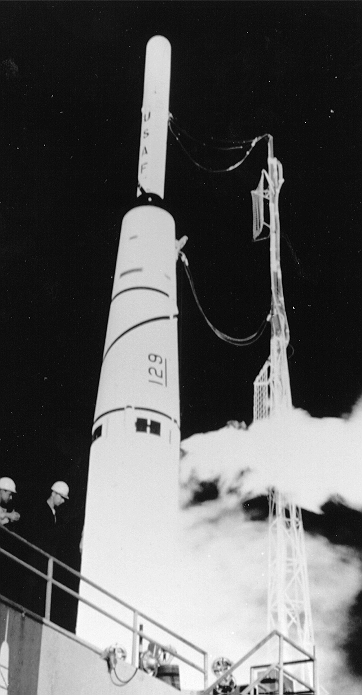
Thor 129

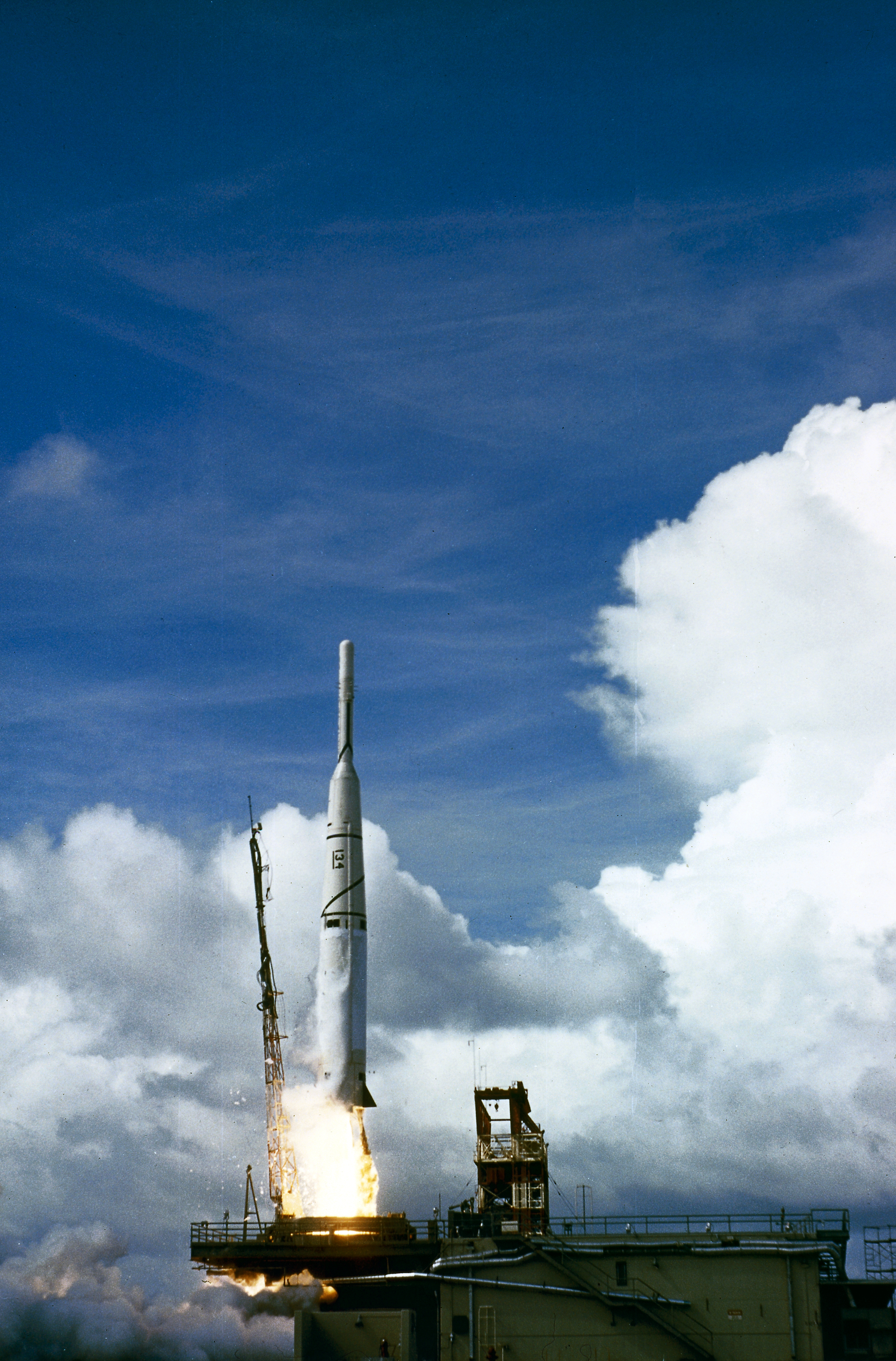
Thor 134

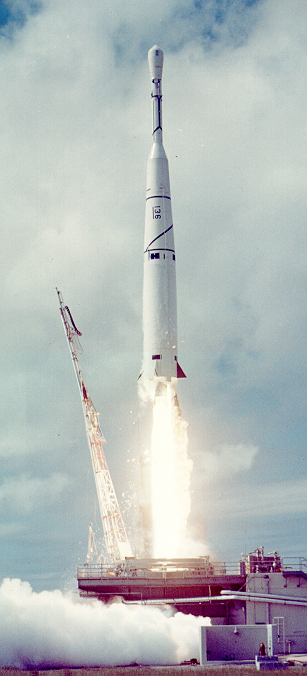
Thor 136
