= Explorer 6 =

NASA satellite of the Explorer program

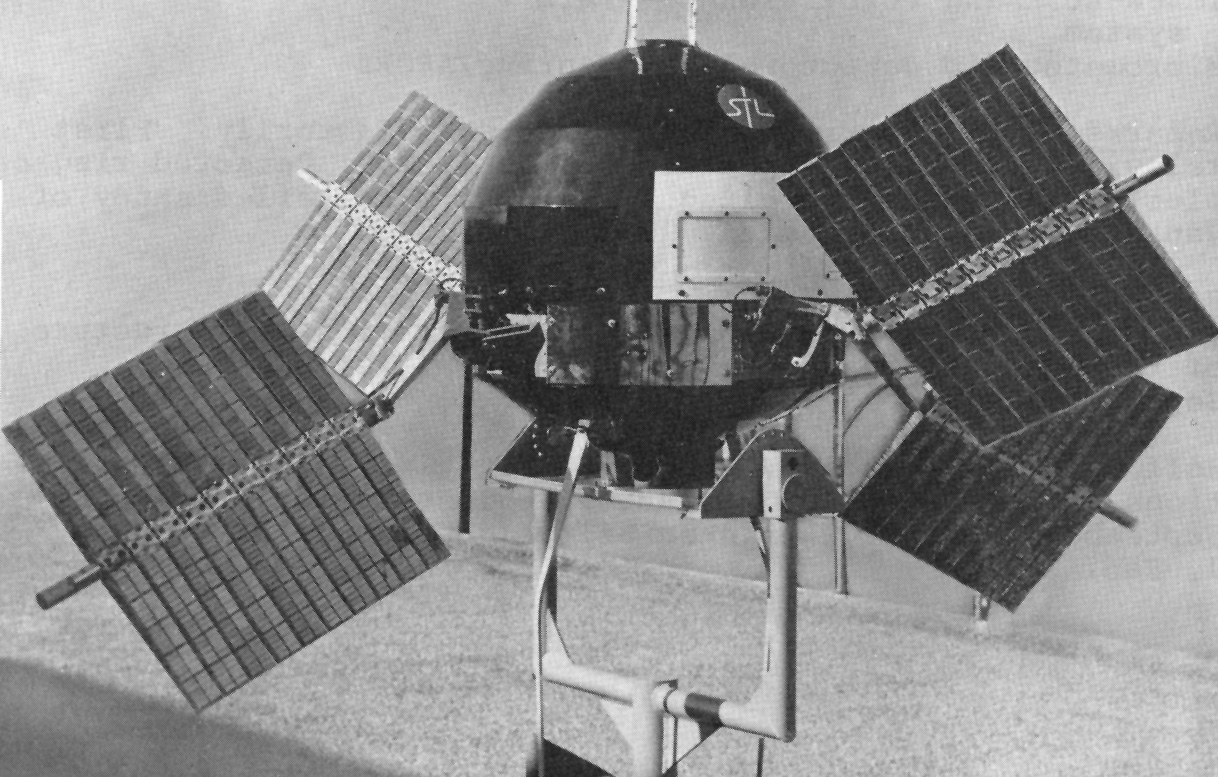
- Explorer-6 satellite
- Names: S-2
- Mission type: Earth science
- Operator: NASA
- Harvard designation: 1959-Delta 1
- COSPAR ID: 1959-004A
- SATCAT no.: 00015
- Mission duration: 60 days (achieved)

Spacecraft properties
- Spacecraft: Explorer VI
- Spacecraft type: Science Explorer
- Bus: S-2
- Manufacturer: Jet Propulsion Laboratory; TRW
- Launch mass: 64.4 kg (142 lb)

Start of mission
- Launch date: 7 August 1959, 14:24:20 GMT
- Rocket: Thor DM-18 Able III (Thor 134)
- Launch site: Cape Canaveral, LC-17A
- Contractor: Douglas Aircraft Company
- Entered service: 7 August 1959

End of mission
- Last contact: 6 October 1959
- Decay date: 1 July 1961

Orbital parameters
- Reference system: Geocentric orbit
- Regime: Highly elliptical orbit
- Perigee altitude: 237 km (147 mi)
- Apogee altitude: 41,900 km (26,000 mi)
- Inclination: 47.0°
- Period: 754.0 minutes

Instruments
- Beacon; Fluxgate Magnetometer; Ion Chamber and Geiger–Müller Counter; Micrometeorite; Proportional Counter Telescope; Scintillation Counter; Search-Coil Magnetometer; TV Optical Scanner; VLF Receiver

Explorer 6, or S-2, was a NASA satellite, launched on 7 August 1959, at 14:24:20 GMT. It was a small, spherical satellite designed to study trapped radiation of various energies, galactic cosmic rays, geomagnetism, radio propagation in the upper atmosphere, and the flux of micrometeorites. It also tested a scanning device designed for photographing the Earth's cloud cover. On 14 August 1959, Explorer 6 took the first photos of Earth from a satellite.

== Experiments ==
=== Beacon (108 and 378 MHz) ===
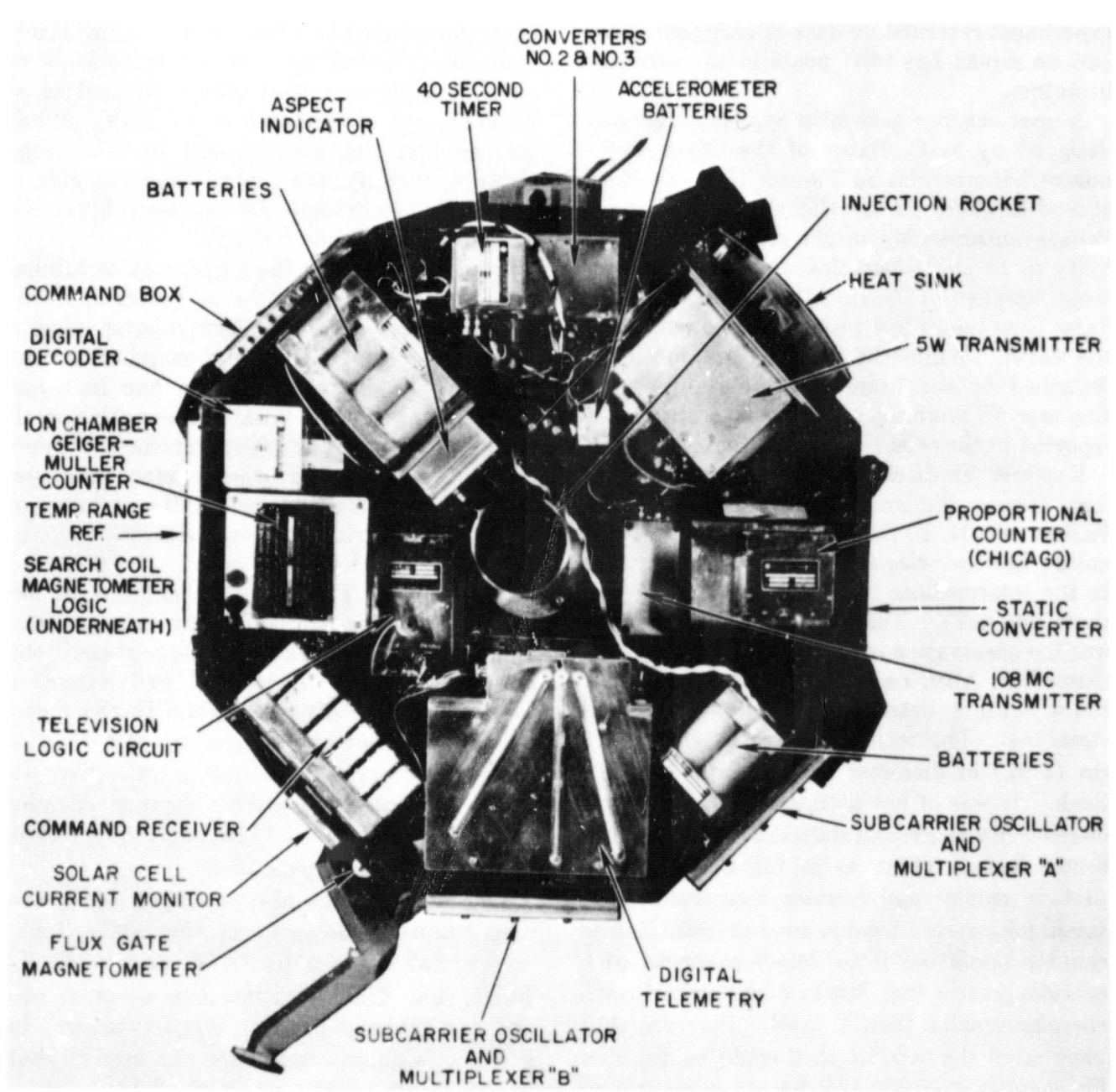
Top view of payload of Explorer 6

Universal newsreel about the launch of Explorer 6

This experiment measured the electron density near the satellite. The observational equipment comprised two coherent transmitters operating at 108 and 378 MHz. Doppler difference frequency and change in Faraday rotation of the 108 MHz signal were observed. Signals were observed from the receiving station at Hawaii for 20 to 70 minutes during each of eight passes during 11 days. Severe fading and a strong magnetic storm added to difficulties in data interpretation. The 378 MHz beacon transmitter failure terminated the experiment.

=== Fluxgate Magnetometer ===
A fluxgate magnetometer was used to measure the component of the magnetic field parallel to the spin axis of the vehicle. The measurements, when combined with those made with the search coil magnetometer (which measured components of the ambient field perpendicular to the spin axis of the vehicle) and the aspect sensor, were intended to determine the direction and magnitude of the ambient magnetic field. It was intended to obtain measurements at altitudes up to 8 Earth radii, but due to permanent multipole disturbances within the vehicle, the fluxgate magnetometer became saturated and returned no data. Thus, information was available from only the search coil and the aspect indicator.

=== Ion Chamber and Geiger–Müller Counter ===
The instrumentation for this experiment consisted of a Neher-type integrating ionization chamber and an Anton 302 Geiger–Müller tube (GM). Due to the complex nonuniform shielding of the detectors, only approximate energy threshold values were available. The ion chamber responded omnidirectionally to electrons and protons with energies greater than 1.5 and 23.6 MeV, respectively. The GM tube responded omnidirectionally to electrons and protons with energies greater than 2.9 and 36.4 MeV respectively. Counts from the GM tube and pulses from the ion chamber were accumulated in separate registers and telemetered by the analog system. The time that elapsed between the first two ion chamber pulses following a data transmission and the accumulation time for 1024 GM tube counts were telemetered digitally. Very little digital data were actually telemetered. The ion chamber operated normally from launch through 25 August 1959. The GM tube operated normally from launch through 6 October 1959.

=== Micrometeorite ===
A micrometeorite detector (micrometeorite momentum spectrometer), which employed piezoelectric crystal microphones as sensing elements, was used to obtain statistics on the momentum flux and the variations of flux of micrometeorites. Although pulses were detected, the experiment returned no data of scientific value.

=== Proportional Counter Telescope ===
A triple-coincidence omnidirectional proportional counter telescope was used to observe protons (with E>75 MeV) and electrons (with E>13 MeV) in the terrestrial trapped radiation region. The scientific objective of the telescopes was to determine some of the properties of high-energy radiation in interplanetary space, including the proportion of counts due to X-rays versus those due to protons and other high-energy particles. Comparison with results from the Cosmic Ray Ionization Chamber makes it possible to determine the type and energy of particles responsible for the measurement.

Each telescope consists of seven proportional counter tubes, six in a concentric ring around the seventh running parallel along their lengths. These bundles of tubes lie on their sides projecting through the top of one of the equipment boxes in the hexagonal base of Ranger 1. Three of the outer tubes are exposed to space and three project into the equipment box. Each set of three is connected electronically into a group that feeds into a pulse amplifier and pulse shaper. The central tube feeds into its own equivalent circuit.

The two telescopes were designated a "low-energy" and "high-energy" telescope, differing only in the amount of shielding and its configuration. The counters in the high-energy telescope were 3-inch long, 0.5-inch diameter brass tubes with a thickness of 0.028 inches. A lead shield of 5 grams per cm^{2} thickness surrounds the entire assembly. The low-energy unit has the same size tubes but made of steel with a wall thickness of 0.508 ± 0.0025-mm. Half the assembly has 5 grams per cm^{2} lead shielding along the length of the tubes. The unshielded half of the assembly is the exposed portion that particles can reach without encountering spacecraft structural material, giving an angular resolution of under 180° for low-energy particles. The low-energy telescope can detect protons with energies greater than or equal to 10 MeV and electrons greater than or equal to 0.5 MeV. The high-energy telescope detects 75 MeV and above protons and 13 MeV and above electrons in triple-coincidence, and bremsstrahlung above 200 keV in the central tube.

When a particle passes through the bundle of tubes, the electronic circuit determines which groups have been penetrated. If a pulse comes from all three groups at once, a triple-coincidence, the particle was a high-energy one, rather than a low-energy one or an X-ray. The triple-coincidence events are telemetered together with the single counts from the center tube to determine counts due to high-energy versus low-energy sources. The high-energy telescope counting rate allows correction of the low-energy telescope data in order that the particle flux incident on the unshielded portion of the low-energy unit can be calculated. Comparing data from the low-energy telescope and the Cosmic-Ray Ionization Chamber (both detect particles in the same energy range) makes it possible to determine the average ionization per particle, from which the type and energy of the particle can be determined.

Several magnetic storms occurred during the active life of the experiment. The date of transmission of the last useful information was on 6 October 1959, after which the transmitter failed to operate.

=== Scintillation Counter ===
The scintillation counter experiment was designed to make direct observations of electrons in the Earth's radiation belts with a detector insensitive to bremsstrahlung. This experiment consisted of a cylindrical plastic scintillator cemented to a photomultiplier tube. The instrument viewed space through a foil-covered window in the payload shell, but the instrument also responded to more energetic particles passing through the payload shell. The minimum energies detectable were 200 keV for electrons and 2 MeV for protons. For electrons between 200 and 500 keV, the detector efficiency times the omnidirectional geometric factor was 0.0008-cm^{2} count per electron; whereas for electrons of energy greater than 500 keV, it was 0.16-cm^{2} count per electron. For very penetrating particles, the geometrical factor rose to its maximum value of 3.5 cm^{2}. The scintillation counter was sampled continuously for analog transmission and intermittently (every 2 minutes, 15 seconds, or 1.9 seconds, depending upon the satellite bit rate) for digital transmission. The transmitter broadcasting the analog data for this experiment failed on 11 September 1959. Data were received on a limited duty cycle from the digital transmitter until early October 1959.

=== Search-Coil Magnetometer ===
This experiment was designed to survey the gross magnetic field of the Earth, to investigate the interplanetary magnetic field, and to detect evidence of any lunar magnetic field. No interplanetary or lunar magnetic fields could be measured, however, because of the spacecraft's low apogee. The instrument was similar to that flown on Pioneer 1 and consisted of a single search coil mounted so that it measured the magnetic field perpendicular to the spacecraft spin axis. The instrument had a range of 0.6 nT to 1200 nT. No inflight calibration was provided. Some degradation of the telemetry signal occurred due to ionospheric effects. Insufficient ground observations on the electron content of the ionosphere prevented correcting the data for these effects. The experiment had both digital and analog outputs. The magnetometer amplitude and phase were sampled continuously for analog transmission and intermittently (every 2 minutes, 15 seconds, or 1.9 seconds, depending on satellite bit rate) for digital transmission. The magnetometer worked until loss of the telemetry signal in early October 1959.

=== TV Optical Scanner ===
The TV optical scanner flown was an improved version of the TV system first employed on Pioneer 2. The experiment consisted of an optical unit containing a concave spherical mirror and phototransistor, a video amplifier, timing and logic circuits, and telemetry. The experiment was designed to test the feasibility of using such instrumentation to obtain low-resolution daylight cloud cover photographs. The scanner also served as a forerunner to the TV camera systems carried on later, more advanced satellites. The scanner's optical axis was directed 45° away from the spacecraft spin axis, which was parallel to the orbital plane. The vehicle's spin furnished the line scanning, and the spacecraft's forward motion along its trajectory provided the frame scanning. During a scan (one spacecraft revolution), a single scan spot (element) on Earth was viewed and transmitted back to Earth. During the next spacecraft revolution, an adjacent spot was scanned. This procedure was repeated until a line of 64 such spots was formed. Then the process was repeated to form an adjacent line of elements, and so on, until a frame, or picture, was obtained. The system could produce useful photographs only when the spacecraft's velocity and orbital position were such that successive lines overlapped. (At apogee, for example, the TV lines were separated by a distance about equal to their length, and hence no meaningful picture could be obtained). Data obtained from this experiment are limited and of extremely poor quality. Proper spacecraft orientation was never achieved, resulting in a considerable amount of blank space between successive scan lines. The scanner's logic circuits also failed to operate normally (only every fourth scan spot could be successfully reproduced), further reducing the resolution. The last useful data were obtained on 25 August 1959.

=== VLF Receiver (15.5 kHz) ===
This Very low frequency (VLF) receiver was designed to study Whistler mode propagation and ionospheric noise on 15.5 kHz signals transmitted from Annapolis, Maryland. The signals were received on a small electric antenna which was simultaneously used to transit Very high frequency (VHF) telemetry. The signal intensity on a 3-db bandwidth of 100 hz was observed along with the antenna impedance. The dynamic range of the receiver was about 80 db. This experiment operated from launch up to about 160 km before failure. With the antenna in a folded configuration for launch, the receiver recorded all data at a sensitivity reduced by about 30 db. At 67 km (42 mi), the signals disappeared into the noise background. However, by special techniques, data were made usable all the way up to 160 km (99 mi).

== Mission ==
=== Launch ===
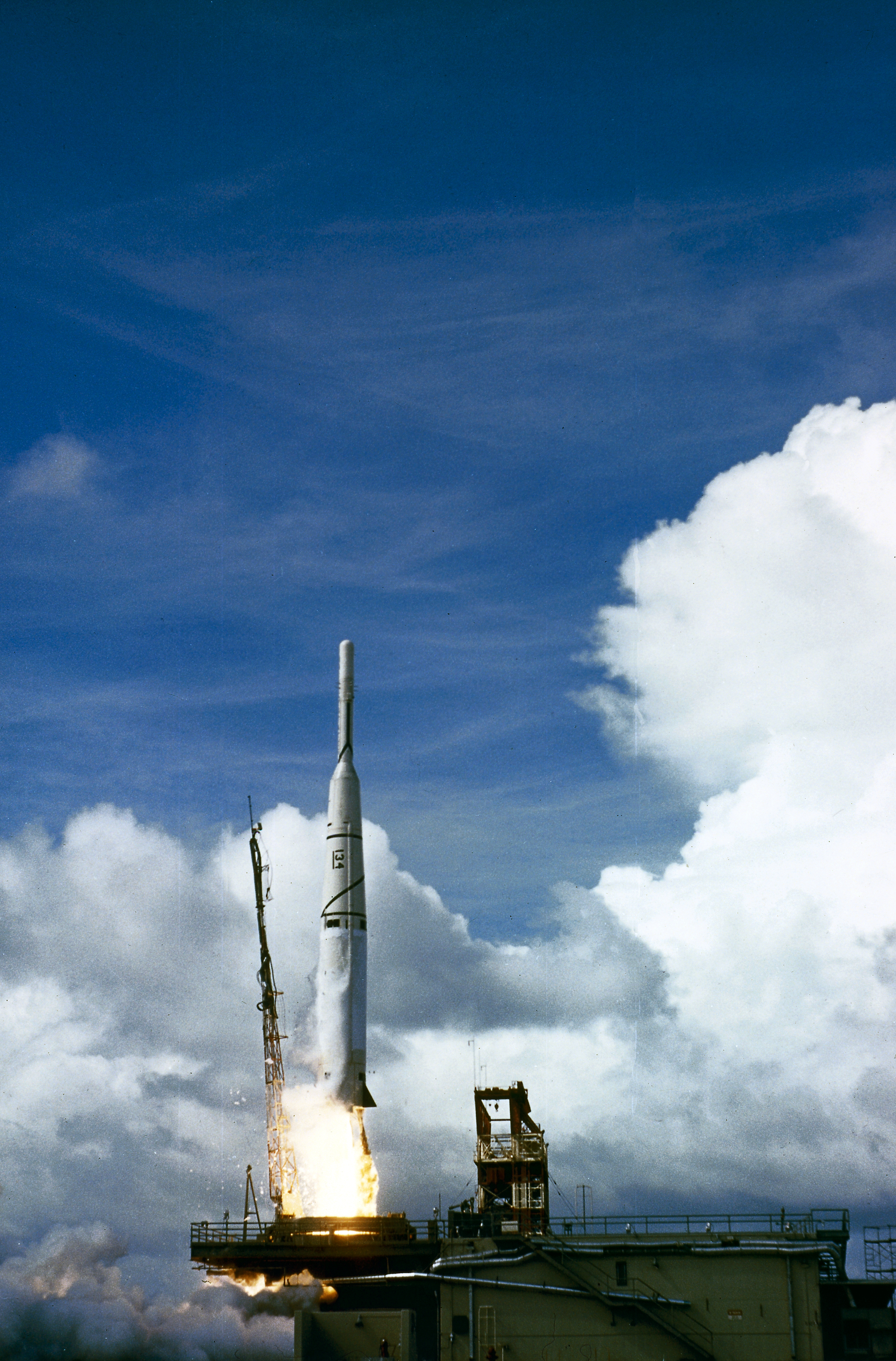
The launch of Explorer 6

The satellite was launched on top of a Thor-Able rocket in Cape Canaveral, Florida into a highly elliptical orbit (250 by 42,500 km) on 7 August 1959, at 14:24:20 GMT.

The satellite was spin-stabilized at 2.8 rotation per second (rps), with the direction of the spin axis having a right ascension of 217° and a declination of 23°. Four solar cell paddles mounted near its equator recharged the storage batteries while in orbit. Each experiment except the television scanner had two outputs, digital and analog. An Ultra high frequency (UHF) transmitter was used for the digital telemetry and the TV signal. Two Very high frequency (VHF) transmitters were used to transmit the analog signal. The VHF transmitters were operated continuously. The UHF transmitter was operated for only a few hours each day.

Only three of the solar cell paddles fully erected, and this occurred during spin-up rather than prior to spin-up as planned. Consequently, initial operation of the payload power supply was 63% nominal, and this decreased with time. The decreased power caused a lower signal-to-noise ratio affecting most of the data, especially near apogee.

=== First image of Earth by a satellite ===
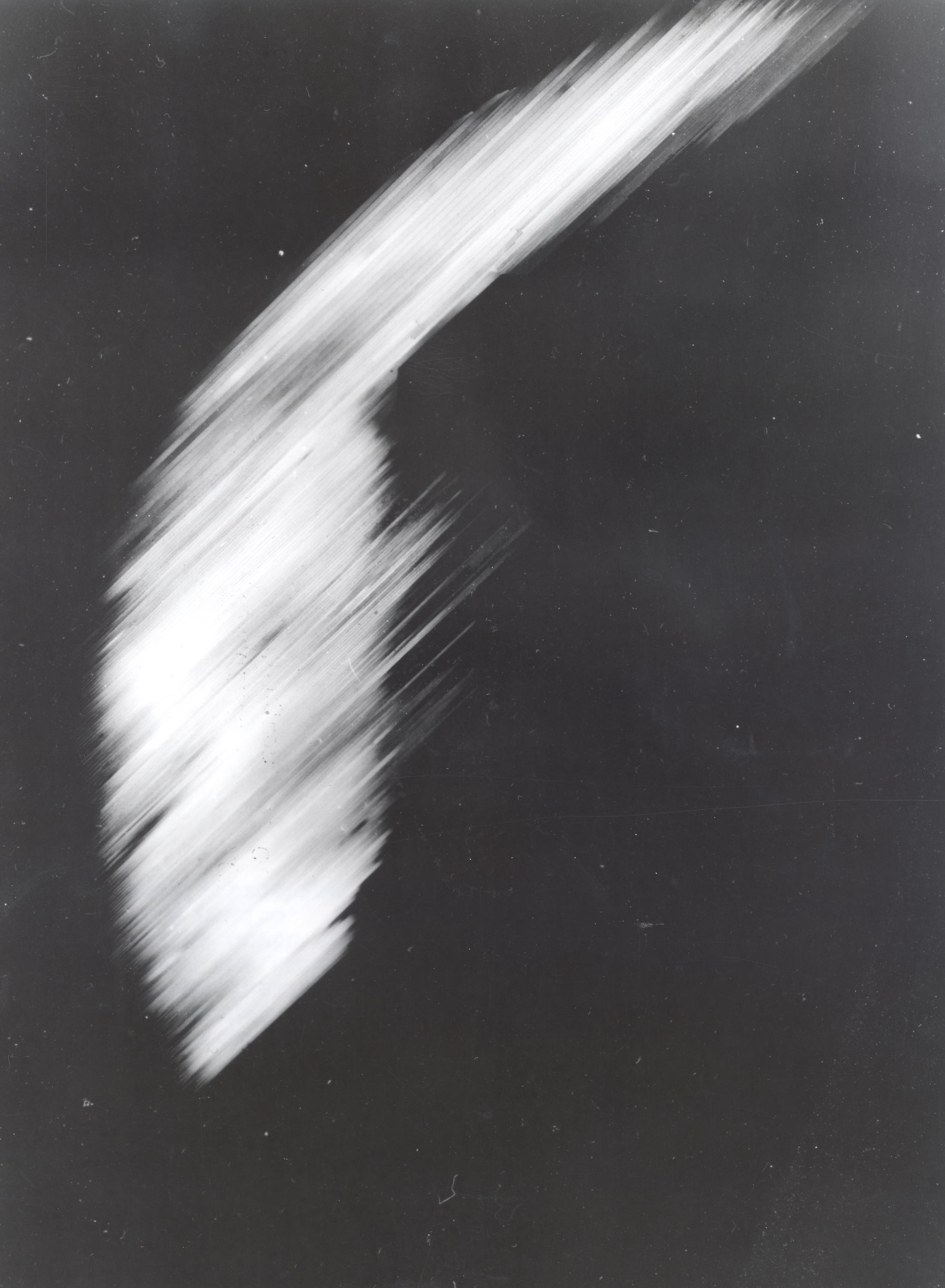
The first image taken by Explorer 6 shows a sunlit area of the Central Pacific Ocean and its cloud cover. The photo was taken when the satellite was about 27,000 km (17,000 mi) above the surface of the Earth on 14 August 1959. At the time, the satellite was crossing Mexico.

On 14 August 1959, Explorer 6 took the first image of Earth ever by a satellite. It was over Mexico at an altitude of approximately 27,000 km (17,000 mi). The image was a picture of the north central Pacific Ocean, transmitted to a ground station in Hawaii over a 40 minute span.

=== End of mission ===
One VHF transmitter failed on 11 September 1959, and the last contact with the payload was made on 6 October 1959, at which time the solar cell charging current had fallen below that required to maintain the satellite equipment.

A total of 827 hours of analog and 23 hours of digital data were obtained.

The satellite's orbit decayed on 1 July 1961.

== ASAT test ==
On 13 October 1959, an anti-satellite missile (ASAT) test of the Bold Orion missile used Explorer 6 as a target. The missile successfully passed within 6.4 km (4.0 mi) of the satellite. Launch took place within the Atlantic Missile Range Drop Zone (AMR DZ). The altitude, latitude and longitude of the drop point were 11,000 m (36,000 ft), 29° North and 79° West, respectively. Bold Orion successfully intercepted the Explorer 6 satellite, passing its target at a range of less than 3.5 km (2.2 mi) and an altitude of 252 km (157 mi).

== See also ==
- First images of Earth from space
- Operation Argus
- Explorer program
