= TIROS-1 =

NASA weather satellite

- The TIROS-1 prototype on display at the Smithsonian National Air and Space Museum.
- Mission type: Weather satellite
- Operator: NASA
- Harvard designation: 1960 β 2
- COSPAR ID: 1960-002B
- SATCAT no.: 29
- Mission duration: 75 days (90 days planned)

Spacecraft properties
- Spacecraft type: TIROS
- Manufacturer: RCA Astro
- Launch mass: 122.5 kilograms (270 lb)

Start of mission
- Launch date: 1 April 1960, 11:40:09 GMT
- Rocket: Thor DM 18-Able II
- Launch site: Cape Canaveral, LC-17A

End of mission
- Last contact: 15 June 1960

Orbital parameters
- Reference system: Geocentric
- Regime: LEO
- Eccentricity: 0.00401
- Perigee altitude: 693 kilometres (431 mi)
- Apogee altitude: 750 kilometres (470 mi)
- Inclination: 48.40°
- Period: 99.16 minutes
- Epoch: 1 Apr 1960 11:45:00

Instruments
- Two slow-scan visible television cameras (wide and narrow-angle); horizon and sun angle sensors

TIROS-1 (or TIROS-A) was the first operational weather satellite, (Note: The Vanguard 2 satellite was the first experimental/prototype weather satellite.) the first of a series of Television Infrared Observation Satellites (TIROS) placed in low Earth orbit.

== Program ==
The TIROS Program was NASA's first experimental step to determine if satellites could be useful in the study of the Earth. At that time, the effectiveness of satellite observations was still unproven. Since satellites were a new technology, the TIROS Program also tested various design issues for spacecraft: instruments, data and operational parameters. The goal was to improve satellite applications for Earth-bound decisions, such as "should we evacuate the coast because of the hurricane?".

The TIROS-1 Program's first priority was the development of a meteorological satellite information system. Weather forecasting was deemed the most promising application of space-based observations.

== Spacecraft ==
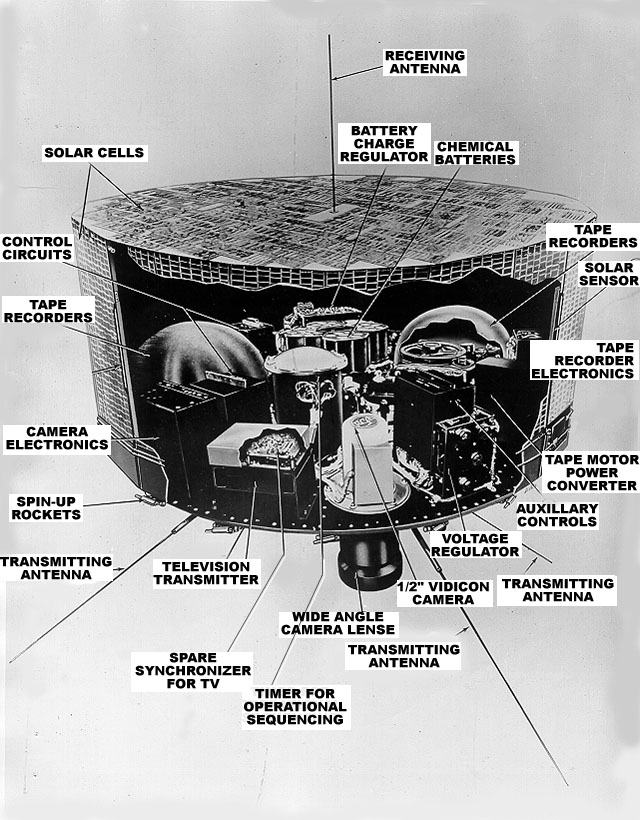
TIROS 1 instruments

TIROS 1 was an 18-sided right prism, 107 centimetres (42 in) across opposite corners and 56 centimetres (22 in) high.

Spacecraft power was supplied by approximately 9000 1 centimetre (0.39 in)- by 2 centimetres (0.79 in) silicon solar cells mounted on the cover assembly and by 21 nickel-cadmium batteries.

A single monopole antenna for reception of ground commands extended out from the top of the cover assembly. A pair of crossed-dipole antennas (235 MHz) for transmission projected down and diagonally out from the baseplate. Mounted around the edge of the baseplate were five diametrically opposed pairs of small, solid-fuel thrusters that maintained the satellite spin rate between 8 and 12 rpm.

The satellite was equipped with two 1.27 centimetres (0.50 in)-diameter vidicon TV cameras, one wide angle and one narrow angle, for taking earth cloud cover pictures. The pictures were transmitted directly to a ground receiving station or were stored in a magnetic tape recorder on board for later playback, depending on whether the satellite was within or beyond the communication range of the station. The satellite was spin-stabilized.

== Mission ==
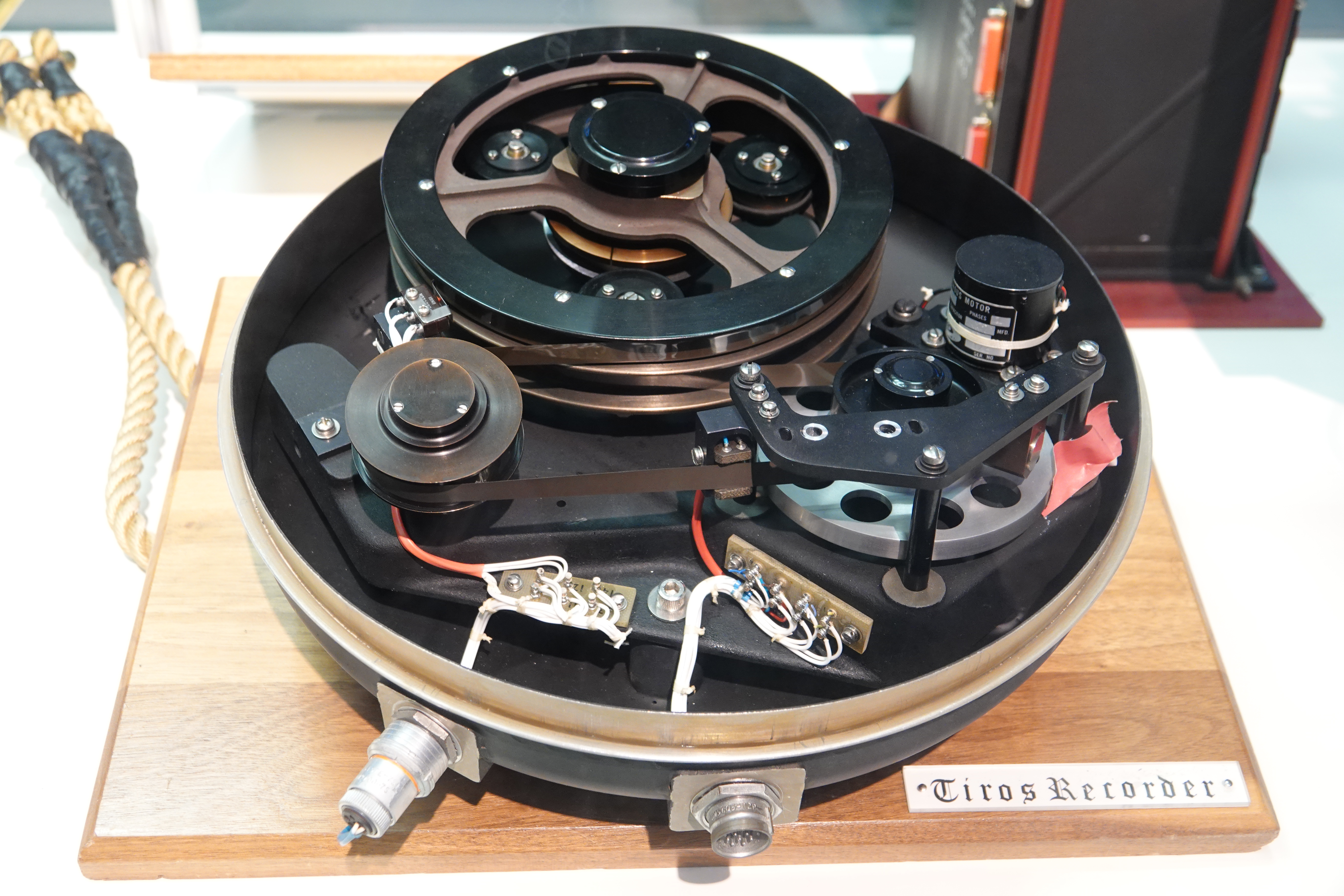
The TIROS-1 magnetic tape data recorder.

TIROS-1 was eventually turned over to NASA to a division which was under Dr. Morris Tepper, and Ed Cortright in Spring 1959. This led up to TIROS-1's launch on April Fools Day. TIROS-1 was finally launched into orbit from Cape Canaveral Space Launch Complex 17A on 1 Apr 1960 at 11:40:09 UTC by a Thor Able II rocket.

Over its 2 1/2-month lifespan, TIROS 1 returned 23,000 photos of the Earth, 19,000 of them usable for weather analysis. For the first time, it was possible to view large scale cloud patterns in their totality, and from this, identify storm regions. The satellite provided the first long-term observations of a developing storm from orbit, tracking the disintegration of a large cyclonic mass off the coast of Bermuda over the course of four days. In addition, TIROS 1 returned data on smaller scale structures such as tornadoes and jet streams, and findings returned from the satellite complemented and enhanced ground-based findings.

TIROS 1 performed normally from launch until June 15, 1960, when an electrical power failure prevented further useful TV transmission.

As of 2024, TIROS 1 remains in orbit.

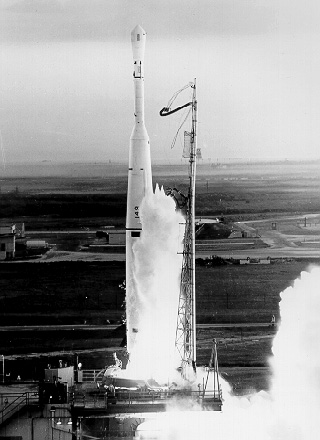
Thor-Able launching TIROS 1

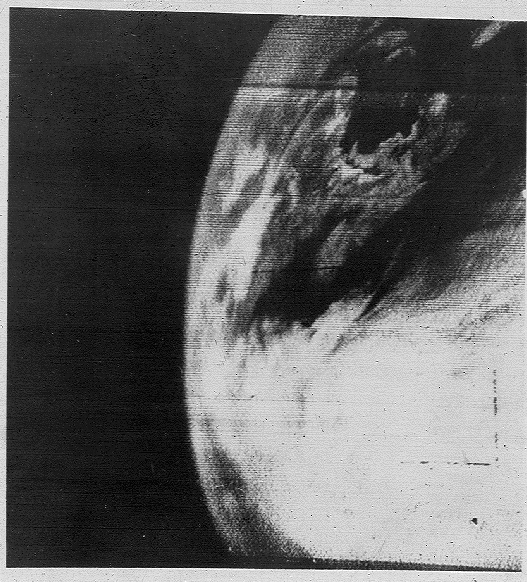
TIROS I wide-angle image taken on April 1, 1960 (one of the first TV images of Earth from space)

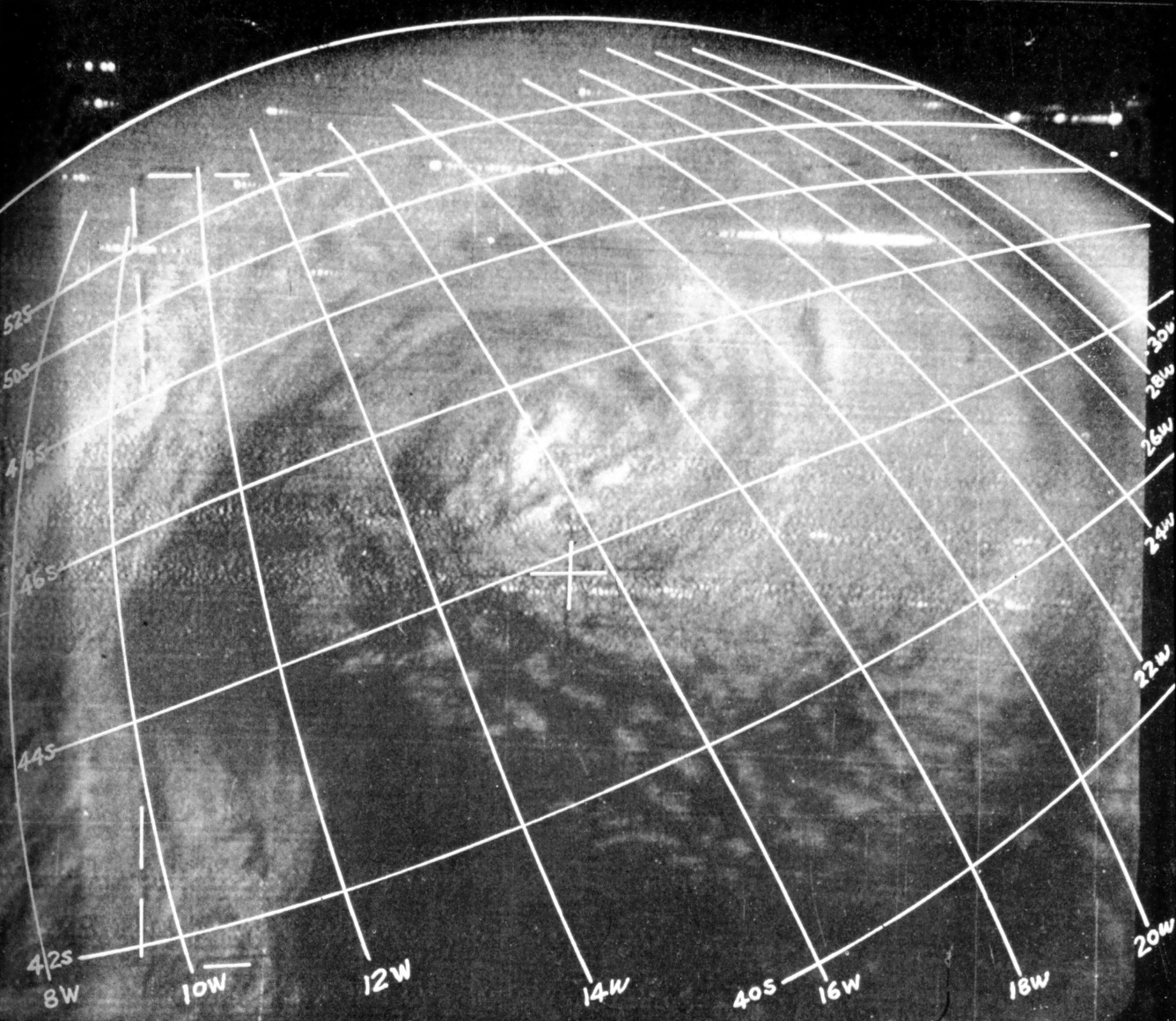
TIROS I image showing a cyclone in South Atlantic, taken on April 28, 1960

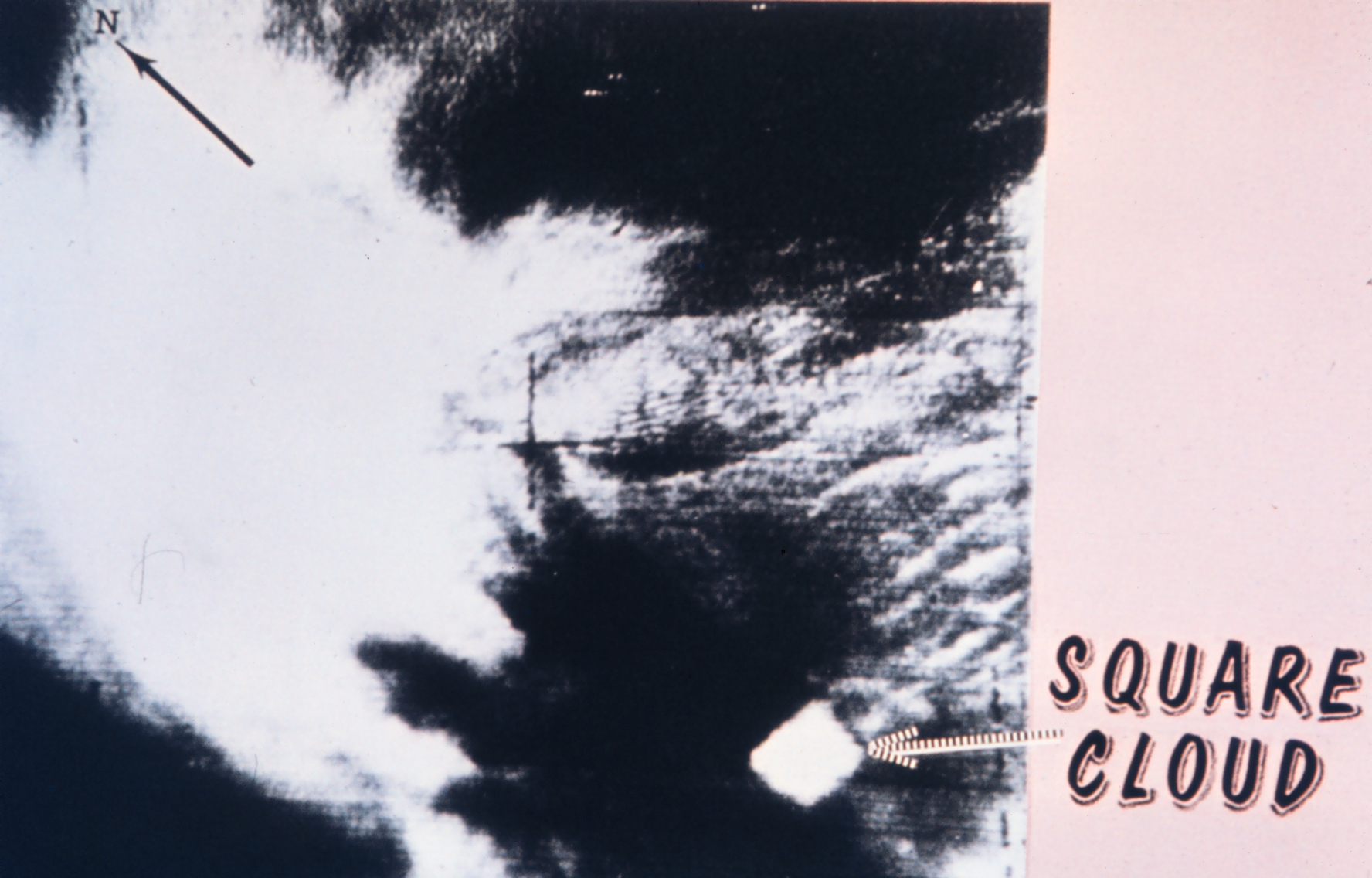
TIROS I image showing an apparently square cloud and a cloud system which enlarged bringing hailstones and tornadoes to central Oklahoma (May 2, 1960)

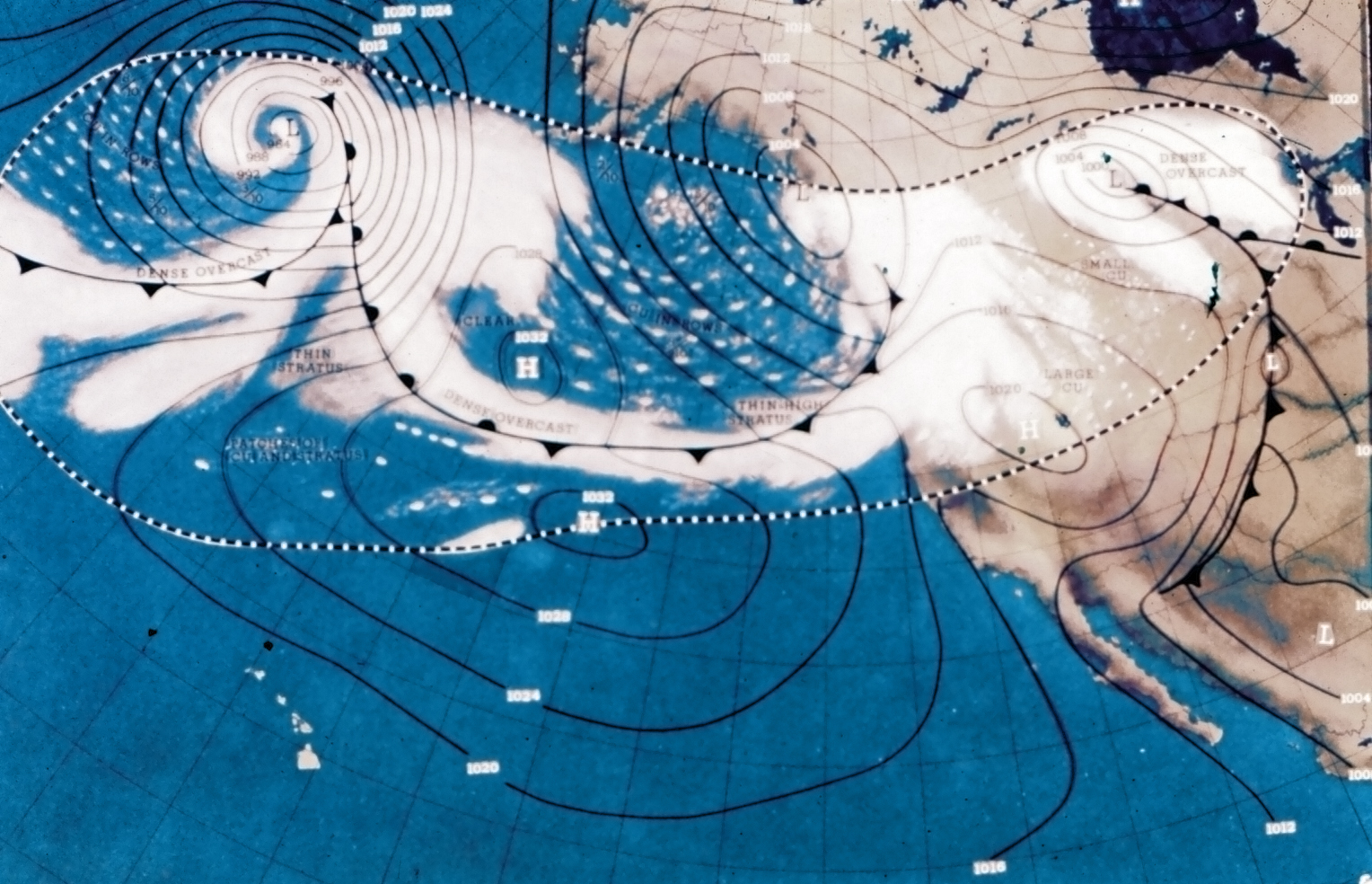
Surface weather map of Pacific frontal storm derived from TIROS I data (May 19, 1960)

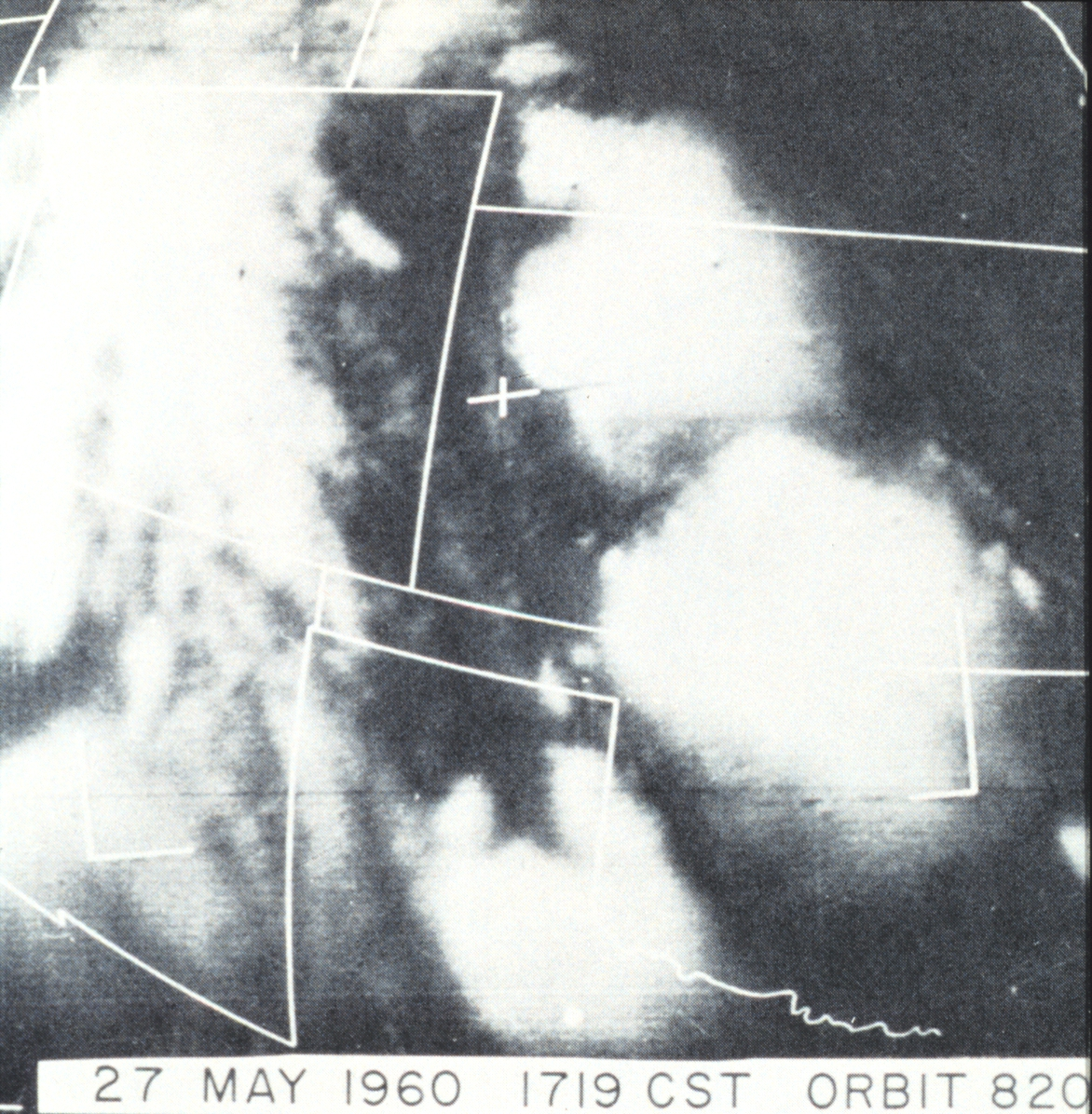
TIROS I image showing bright clouds with relatively well-defined edges and isolated from a main cloud mass. Shortly after this photograph, the southernmost cloud spawned a tornado (May 27, 1960).

Frames from TIROS-1’s 44th orbit in space

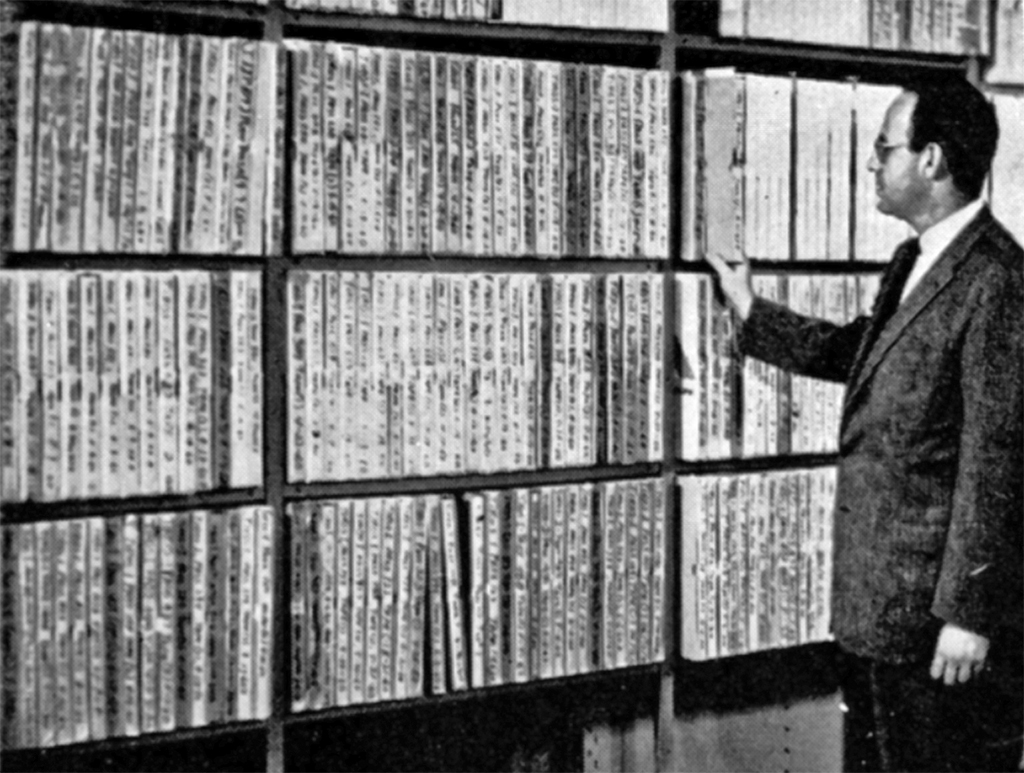
Archived tapes of telemetry data received from TIROS I (June 1960)

== See also ==
- First images of Earth from space
