= List of Delta III launches =

Delta III was an expendable launch vehicle made by Boeing. The first Delta III launch was on August 26, 1998. Of its three flights, the first two were failures, and the third, though declared successful, reached the low end of its targeted orbit range and carried only a dummy (inert) payload. The Delta III could deliver up to 8,400 pounds (3,800 kilograms) to geostationary transfer orbit, twice the payload of its predecessor, the Delta II. Under the four-digit designation system from earlier Delta rockets, the Delta III is classified as the Delta 8930.

== Launch outcome statistics ==
- Failure
- Partial Failure

== Launch history ==
Flight Number	Date / time (UTC)	Rocket Configuration	Launch site	Payload	Payload mass	Orbit	Customer	Launch outcome
1	August 27, 1998; 01:17	Delta III 8930	CCAFS SLC-17B	Galaxy 10	700 kg (1,500 lb)	GTO	PanAmSat / Intelsat	Failure
1	Maiden flight of Delta III. Destroyed by range safety after control problems and depletion of hydraulic fluid. Communications satellite.							
2	May 5, 1999; 01:00	Delta III 8930	CCAFS SLC-17B	Orion 3	4,300 kg (9,500 lb)	GTO	Loral	Failure
2	Second stage engine failure. Payload placed in low Earth orbit, declared too low and Loral called satellite lost. Communications satellite.							
3	August 23, 2000; 11:05	Delta III 8930	CCAFS SLC-17B	DM-F3	4,383 kg (9,663 lb)	GTO	US Air Force	Partial failure
3	Reached lower than planned orbit. Final flight of Delta III. Payload was a DemoSat.							
