= List of Thor DM-21 Agena-D launches =

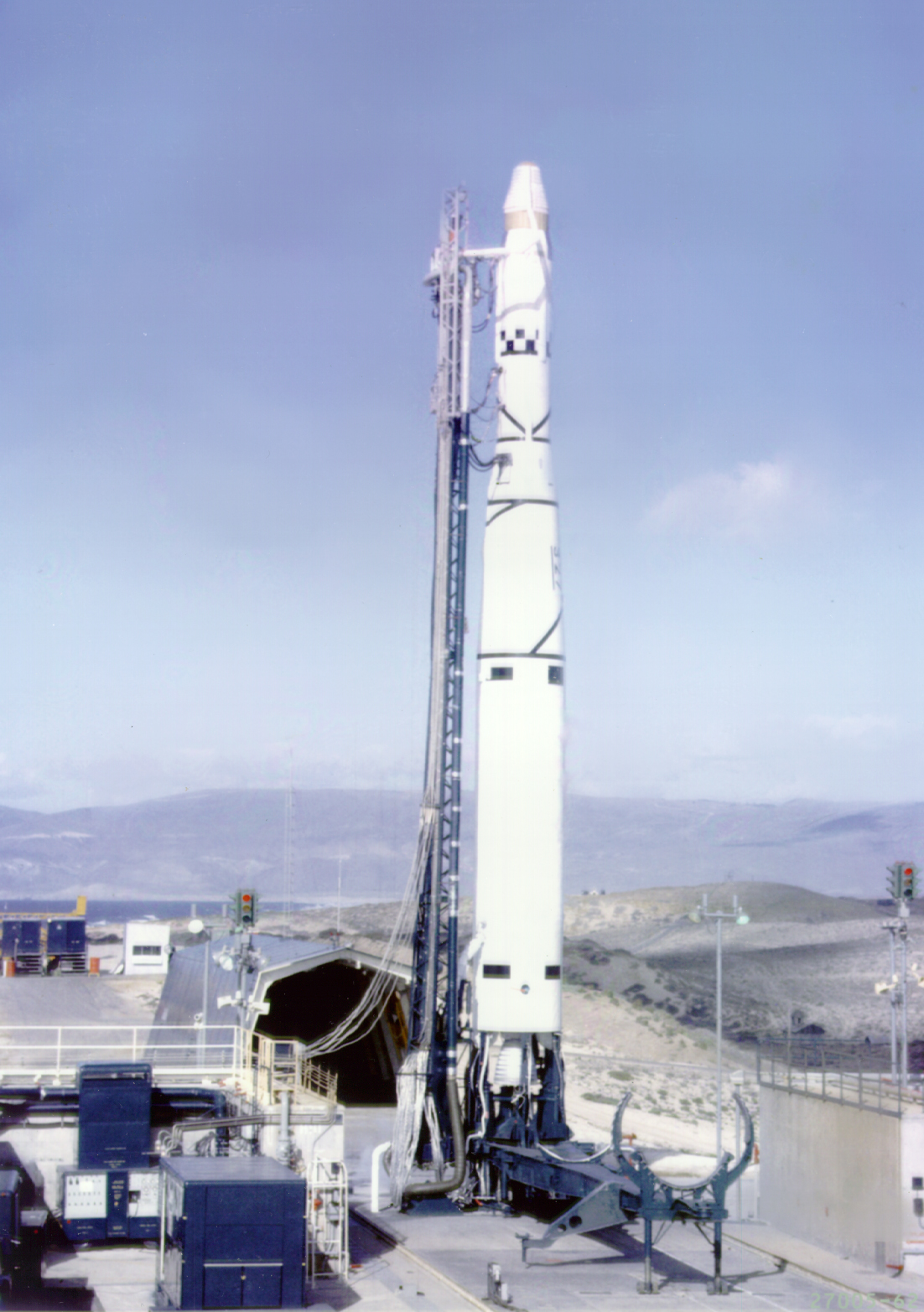
A Thor-Agena launch vehicle, ready to launch the Discoverer 37 (KH-3) spacecraft, on 13 January 1962

Thor DM-21 Agena-D or just Thor-Agena was an orbital launch vehicle. The launch vehicles used the Douglas-built Thor first stage and the Lockheed-built Agena second stages. They are thus cousins of the more-famous Thor-Deltans, which founded the Delta launch vehicle family. The first attempted launch of a Thor DM-21 Agena-D was on 28 June 1962. The first successful launch was also on 28 June 1962, launching FTV 1151. It was the first two-stage rocket to place a satellite into orbit.

== Launch statistics ==
=== Launch outcome ===
- Success
- Failure

=== Orbit ===
- LEO
- MEO

== Launch history ==
The data in this table comes from
Date/Time (UTC)	Rocket	S/N	Launch site	Payload	Function	Orbit	Outcome	Remarks
1962-06-28; 01:09	Thor DM-21 Agena-D	Thor 340; Agena 1151	VAFB LC-75-1-1	FTV 1151	Reconnaissance	LEO	Success	
1962-08-02; 00:17	Thor DM-21 Agena-D	Thor 344; Agena 1152	VAFB LC-75-1-1	FTV 1152	Reconnaissance	LEO	Success	
1962-08-29; 01:00	Thor DM-21 Agena-D	Thor 349; Agena 1153	VAFB LC-75-1-2	FTV 1153	Reconnaissance	LEO	Success	
1962-09-29; 23:34:50	Thor DM-21 Agena-D	Thor 351; Agena 1154	VAFB LC-75-1-2	FTV 1154	Reconnaissance	LEO	Success	
1962-10-26; 16:14	Thor DM-21 Agena-D	Thor 353; Agena 1401	VAFB LC-75-1-2	STARAD	Radiation	MEO	Success	
1962-12-04; 21:30	Thor DM-21 Agena-D	Thor 361; Agena 1155	VAFB LC-75-1-2	FTV 1155	Reconnaissance	LEO	Success	
1962-12-13; 04:07	Thor DM-21 Agena-D	Thor 365	VAFB LC-75-1-1	NRL PL120; Injun 3 NRL PL121; SURCAL 2 Calsphere 1	ELINT; Ionospheric; Calibration	MEO	Success	
1962-12-14; 21:26:07	Thor DM-21 Agena-D	Thor 368; Agena 1156	VAFB LC-75-3-5	FTV 1156	Reconnaissance	LEO	Success	
1963-01-07; 21:09:49	Thor DM-21 Agena-D	Thor 369; Agena 1157	VAFB LC-75-1-1	OPS 0048	Reconnaissance	LEO	Success	
1963-04-01; 23:01	Thor DM-21 Agena-D	Thor 376; Agena 1160	VAFB LC-75-3-5	OPS 0720	Reconnaissance	LEO	Success	
1963-04-26; 20:13	Thor DM-21 Agena-D	Thor 372; Agena 1411	VAFB LC-75-1-1	OPS 1008	Reconnaissance	LEO	Failure	Attitude sensor alignment error results in no Agena orbit.
1963-06-15; 14:29	Thor DM-21 Agena-D	Thor 378; Agena 2353	VAFB LC-75-1-1	FTV 1292; Solrad 6A; LOFTI 2B; Surcal 3 Radose 112	ELINT; Radiation; Ionospheric; Calibration	LEO	Success	
1963-07-19; 00:00:10	Thor DM-21 Agena-D	Thor 388; Agena 1412	VAFB LC-75-1-1	OPS 1266	Reconnaissance	LEO	Success	
1965-03-09; 18:29	Thor DM-21 Agena-D	Thor 419; Agena 2701	VAFB SLC-2W	SECOR 3 / Dodecapole 1 / Poppy 4 / Solrad 7B / GGSE 2 / GGSE 3 / Surcal 4 / Oscar 3	Geodesic research / Radar calibration / ELINT / ELINT / Technological test / Technological test / Technological test / Amateur radio satellite	LEO	Success	
1965-09-02; 20:00	Thor DM-21 Agena-D	Thor 401; Agena 1602	VAFB LC-75-3-5	MPRV	Upper atmosphere and space experiments	planned: MEO	Failure	High winds caused the vehicle to drift off course. RSO T+43 seconds. Debris fell on a trailer park.
1967-05-31; 09:30	Thor DM-21 Agena-D	Thor 443; Agena 2704	VAFB SLC-2W	Timation 1 / GGSE 4 / GGSE 5 / Poppy 5 / Calsphere 3 / Calsphere 4 / Surcal 152 / Surcal 153 / Surcal 150B	Experimental navigation satellite / Technological research satellite / ELINT / Technological research satellites (x5)	LEO	Success	Final flight of the original Thor-Agena series.
