= Thor-Able =

1958-1960 US space rocket system

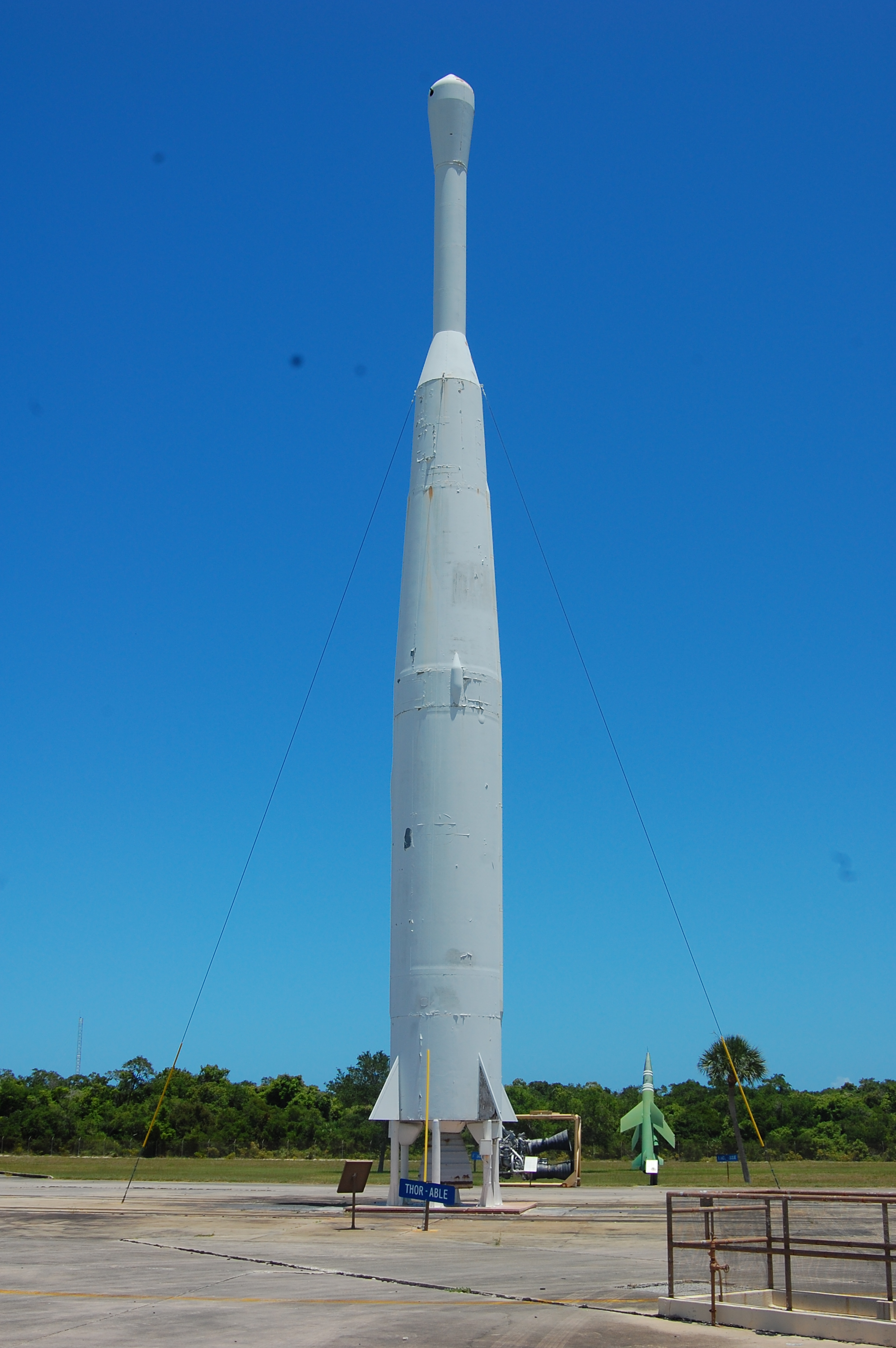
- Thor-Able on display at the Air Force Space & Missile Museum
- Function: Expendable launch system
- Manufacturer: Douglas/Aerojet
- Country of origin: United States

Size
- Height: 26.9 metres (88 ft) – 27.8 metres (91 ft)
- Diameter: 2.44 metres (8 ft 0 in)
- Mass: 51,608 kilograms (113,776 lb)
- Stages: 2–3

Capacity

Payload to 640km LEO
- Mass: 120 kilograms (260 lb)

Associated rockets
- Family: Thor
- Derivative work: Thor-Ablestar; Delta
- Comparable: Luna

Launch history
- Launch sites: LC-17A, Canaveral
- Total launches: 9 suborbital 7 orbital
- Success(es): 7 suborbital 3 orbital
- Failure(s): 2 suborbital 4 orbital
- First flight: 24 April 1958
- Last flight: 1 April 1960
- Carries passengers or cargo: Pioneer; Transit; Tiros

First stage – Thor
- Powered by: 1 LR79-7
- Maximum thrust: 758.71 kilonewtons (170,560 lbf)
- Specific impulse: 282 seconds (2.77 km/s)
- Burn time: 165 seconds
- Propellant: RP-1/LOX

Second stage – Able
- Powered by: 1 AJ10-101
- Maximum thrust: 34.69 kilonewtons (7,800 lbf)
- Specific impulse: 270 seconds (2.6 km/s)
- Burn time: 115 seconds
- Propellant: HNO_{3}/UDMH

Third stage (optional) – Altair
- Powered by: 1 X-248
- Maximum thrust: 12.45 kilonewtons (2,800 lbf)
- Specific impulse: 256 seconds (2.51 km/s)
- Burn time: 38 seconds
- Propellant: Solid

The Thor-Able was an American expendable launch system used for a series of re-entry vehicle tests and spacecraft launches between 1958 and 1960.

It was a two-stage rocket, consisting of a Thor IRBM as a first stage and a Vanguard-derived Able second stage. For satellite or space probe launches, an Altair solid rocket motor was added as a third stage. It was a member of the Thor family and an early predecessor of the Delta.

The Able upper stage name represents its place as the first in the series, from the Joint Army/Navy Phonetic Alphabet.

The Thor-Able vehicle had a stronger airframe than the standard Thor IRBM and had the inertial guidance system replaced by a radio guidance package mounted on the Able stages.

== Launches ==
Sixteen Thor-Able were launched, nine on sub-orbital re-entry vehicle test flights, four on probe and three on orbital satellite launch attempts. Six of the launches resulted in failures, in which three of those were the result of the additional Altair upper stage, added to the rocket to allow it to launch spacecraft beyond a sub-orbital trajectory. All sixteen launches occurred from Cape Canaveral Air Force Station Launch Complex 17A.

The rocket saw its first test on 23 April 1958 when Thor-Able 116 was launched from LC-17A with a biological nose cone containing a mouse named MIA (Mouse In Able). At 19:10 EST, the Thor's engine ignited and drove the Able stage and its passenger into the sky. Two minutes and fifteen seconds after launch, at an altitude of 50 miles (80 km), the Thor exploded and sent the hapless rodent into the Atlantic Ocean instead of space. The cause of the failure was traced to a turbopump bearing coming loose and resulting in pump shutdown and instant loss of thrust. With no attitude control, the Thor pitched down and its LOX tank ruptured from aerodynamic loads. On 9 July, Thor-Able 118 lifted off for a second attempt with a mouse named MIA II. The booster, including the unproven Able stage, performed successfully and the biological nose cone was driven back into the atmosphere for a splashdown in the South Atlantic, but recovery crews failed to locate the capsule and it sank into the ocean. A third attempt was made on 23 July. The press refused to call the mouse by the name of MIA III, so she was instead christened "Wickie", after a local female news reporter who had covered the space program at Cape Canaveral. Unfortunately, Wickie was no luckier than her predecessors when recovery crews once again failed to locate the capsule after splashdown, but telemetry data confirmed the mouse's survival from liftoff through reentry and proved comprehensively that living organisms could survive space travel.

Attention now turned to Thor-Able 127 and Pioneer 0, the world's first lunar probe. This flight took place on 17 August, but ended embarrassingly when the Thor exploded 77 seconds into the launch due to another turbopump malfunction. After an Atlas missile test a month later also failed due to the turbopumps, the Air Force Ballistic Missile Division quickly replaced the pumps in all of their missiles and this problem did not repeat itself again.

On 10 October, Pioneer 1 was launched on Thor-Able 130. The second stage shut down too early and the probe did not have sufficient velocity to escape Earth's gravity. It re-entered the atmosphere and burned up 43 hours after launch.

Pioneer 2 was launched on 8 November (Thor-Able 129) and reentered the atmosphere less than an hour after launch when the third stage failed to ignite.

The next six Thor-Able flights were suborbital tests for the Air Force (23 January, 28 February, 21 March, 8 April, 20 May, and 11 June 1959). All of these were successful except the first one, which failed to stage due to an electrical problem and fell into the Atlantic Ocean.

On 7 August, Explorer 6 (a scientific satellite) was launched on Thor-Able 134 and successfully orbited.

On 17 September, Transit 1A on Thor-Able 136 failed to orbit due to the third stage again failing to ignite.

On 3 November, Pioneer 5 was successfully launched on Thor-Able 219. Intended originally as a Venus probe, technical delays caused it to be launched after the 1959 Venus window had closed so that it was instead sent into a heliocentric orbit.

The final Thor-Able launch was Thor-Able 148, orbiting Tiros-1 on 1 April 1960.

The date in this table comes from
Date/Time (GMT)	Rocket	S/N	Launch site	Payload	Function	Orbit	Outcome	Remarks
1958-04-24; 00:10	Thor DM-18 Able	Thor 116	CCAFS LC-17A		RTV test	Suborbital	Failure	Maiden flight of Thor-Able. Turbopump failure T+146 seconds.
1958-07-10; 15:06	Thor DM-18 Able	Thor 118	CCAFS LC-17A		RTV test	Suborbital	Success	
1958-07-23; 22:13	Thor DM-18 Able	Thor 119	CCAFS LC-17A		RTV test	Suborbital	Success	Biological nose cone containing a mouse. The nose cone sank into the ocean and was not recovered.
1958-08-17; 12:18	Thor DM-18 Able-I	Thor 127	CCAFS LC-17A	Pioneer 0	Lunar orbiter	High Altitude	Failure	Maiden flight of Thor-Able I. First use of a Thor-based vehicle for an orbital launch. Turbopump failure, T+73,6 seconds.
1958-10-11; 08:42:13	Thor DM-18 Able-I	Thor 130	CCAFS LC-17A	Pioneer 1	Lunar orbiter	High Altitude	Failure	Third stage underperformed
1958-11-08; 08:42:13	Thor DM-18 Able-I	Thor 129	CCAFS LC-17A	Pioneer 2	Lunar orbiter	High Altitude	Failure	Third stage failed to ignite
1959-01-23	Thor DM-18 Able-II	Thor 128	CCAFS LC-17A		RVX test	Suborbital	Failure	Thor portion of flight successful. Staging failed due to an electrical malfunction. Vehicle fell into the Atlantic Ocean.
1959-02-28; 07:58	Thor DM-18 Able-II	Thor 131	CCAFS LC-17A		RVX test	Suborbital	Success	
1959-03-21; 06:19	Thor DM-18 Able-II	Thor 132	CCAFS LC-17A		RVX test	Suborbital	Success	
1959-04-08; 06:35	Thor DM-18 Able-II	Thor 133	CCAFS LC-17A		RVX test	Suborbital	Success	
1959-05-21; 06:40	Thor DM-18 Able-II	Thor 135	CCAFS LC-17A		RVX test	Suborbital	Success	
1959-06-11; 06:44	Thor DM-18 Able-II	Thor 137	CCAFS LC-17A		RVX test	Suborbital	Success	
1959-08-07; 14:24:20	Thor DM-18 Able-III	Thor 134	CCAFS LC-17A	Explorer 6	Radiation	HEO	Success	
1959-09-17; 14:34	Thor DM-18 Able-II	Thor 136	CCAFS LC-17A	Transit 1A	Navigation	LEO	Failure	Third stage malfunctioned
1960-03-11; 13:00	Thor DM-18 Able-IV	Thor 219	CCAFS LC 17A	Pioneer 5	Scientific	Heliocentric	Success	Only flight of Thor-Able IV
1960-04-01; 11:40:09	Thor DM-18 Able-II	Thor 148	CCAFS LC-17A	TIROS-1	Weather	SSO	Success	Final flight of Thor-Able

== See also ==
- List of Thor and Delta launches (includes Thor-Able)
- Thor (rocket family)
