= Pioneer 2 =

Failed NASA mission to the Moon (1958)

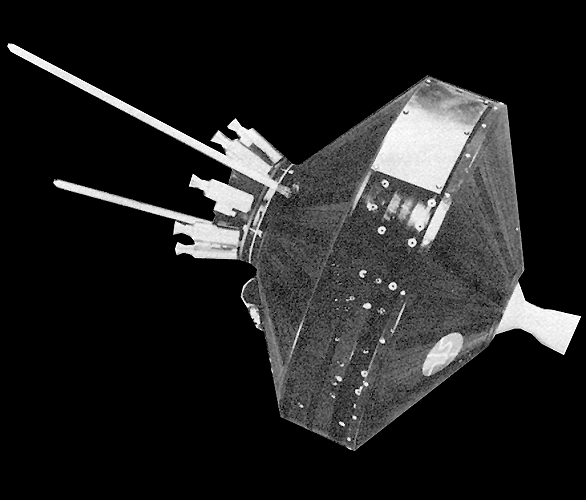
- The lunar orbiter Pioneer 2.
- Mission type: Lunar orbiter
- Operator: NASA
- Mission duration: 42 minutes, 10 seconds Failed to orbit
- Apogee: 1,550 km (960 mi)

Spacecraft properties
- Manufacturer: Space Technology Laboratories
- Launch mass: 39.2 kg (86 lb)

Start of mission
- Launch date: 8 November 1958, 07:30:21 GMT
- Rocket: Thor DM 18-Able I
- Launch site: Cape Canaveral, LC-17A

End of mission
- Decay date: 8 November 1958, 08:12:31 GMT
Instruments
- Ionization Chamber
- Magnetometer
- Temperature Sensors
- Micrometeoroid Sensor
- Proportional Counter Telescope
- Television System

Pioneer 2 (also known as Able 3) was the last of the three project Able space probes designed to probe lunar and cislunar space.

== Spacecraft design ==
Pioneer 2 (NSSDCA ID: PION2) was nearly identical to Pioneer 1. It consisted of a thin cylindrical midsection with a squat truncated cone frustum on each side. The cylinder was 74 centimeters (29 in) in diameter and the height from the top of one cone to the top of the opposite cone was 76 centimeters (30 in). Along the axis of the spacecraft and protruding from the end of the lower cone was a 11-kilogram (24 lb) solid propellant injection rocket and rocket case, which formed the main structural member of the spacecraft. Eight small low-thrust solid propellant velocity adjustment rockets were mounted on the end of the upper cone in a ring assembly which could be jettisoned after use. A magnetic dipole antenna also protruded from the top of the upper cone. The shell was composed of laminated plastic. The total mass of the spacecraft after vernier separation but before injection rocket firing was 39.5 kilograms (87 lb).

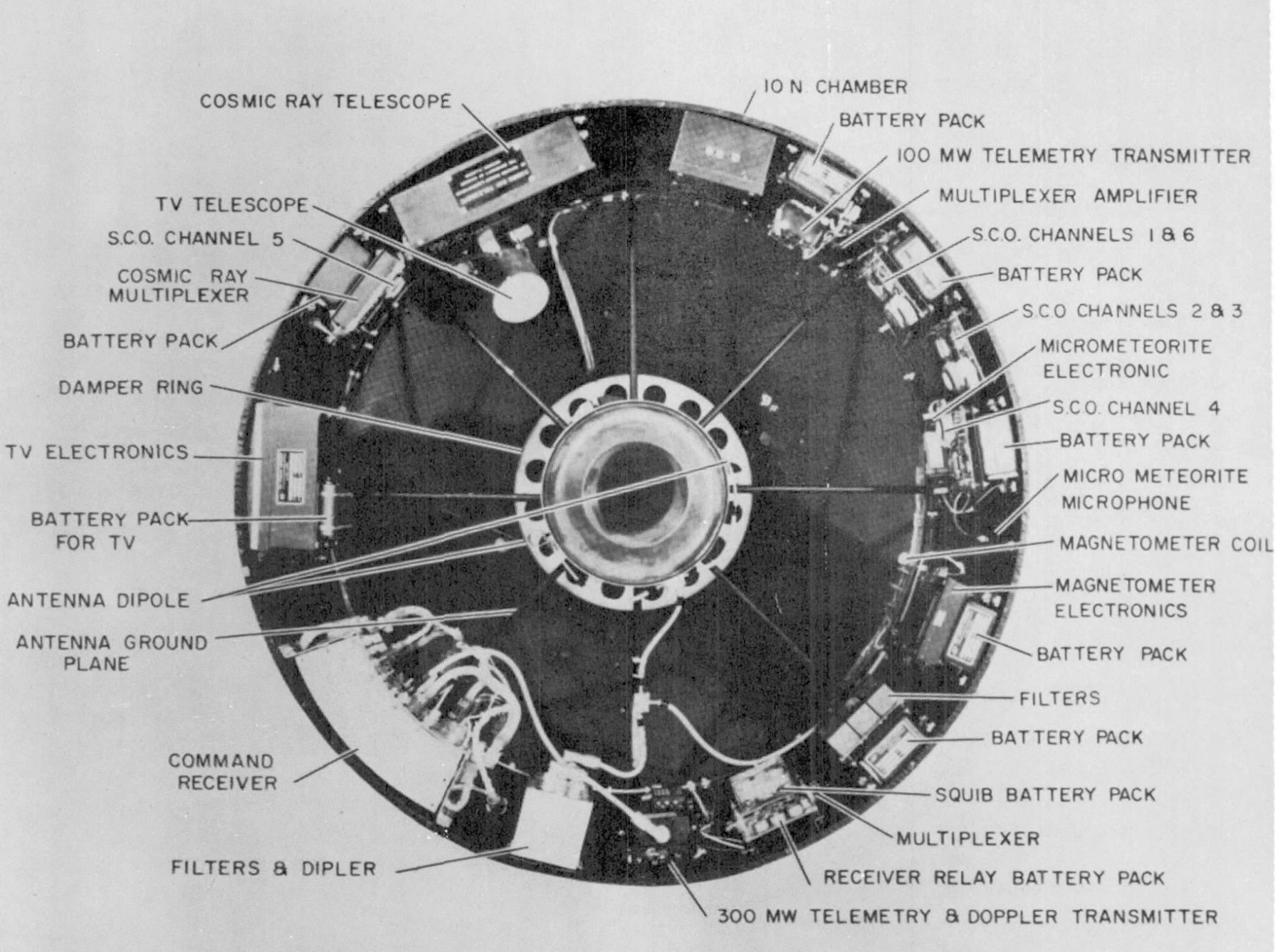
Pioneer 2 payload configuration

The scientific instrument package had a mass of 15.6 kg (34.4 lb) and consisted of an STL image-scanning television system (which replaced the NOTS (Naval Ordnance Test Station) image scanning infrared television system on Pioneer 1), a proportional counter for radiation measurements, an ionization chamber to measure radiation in space, a diaphragm/microphone assembly to detect micrometeorites, a spin-coil magnetometer to measure magnetic fields to 5 microgauss, and temperature-variable resistors to record spacecraft internal conditions.

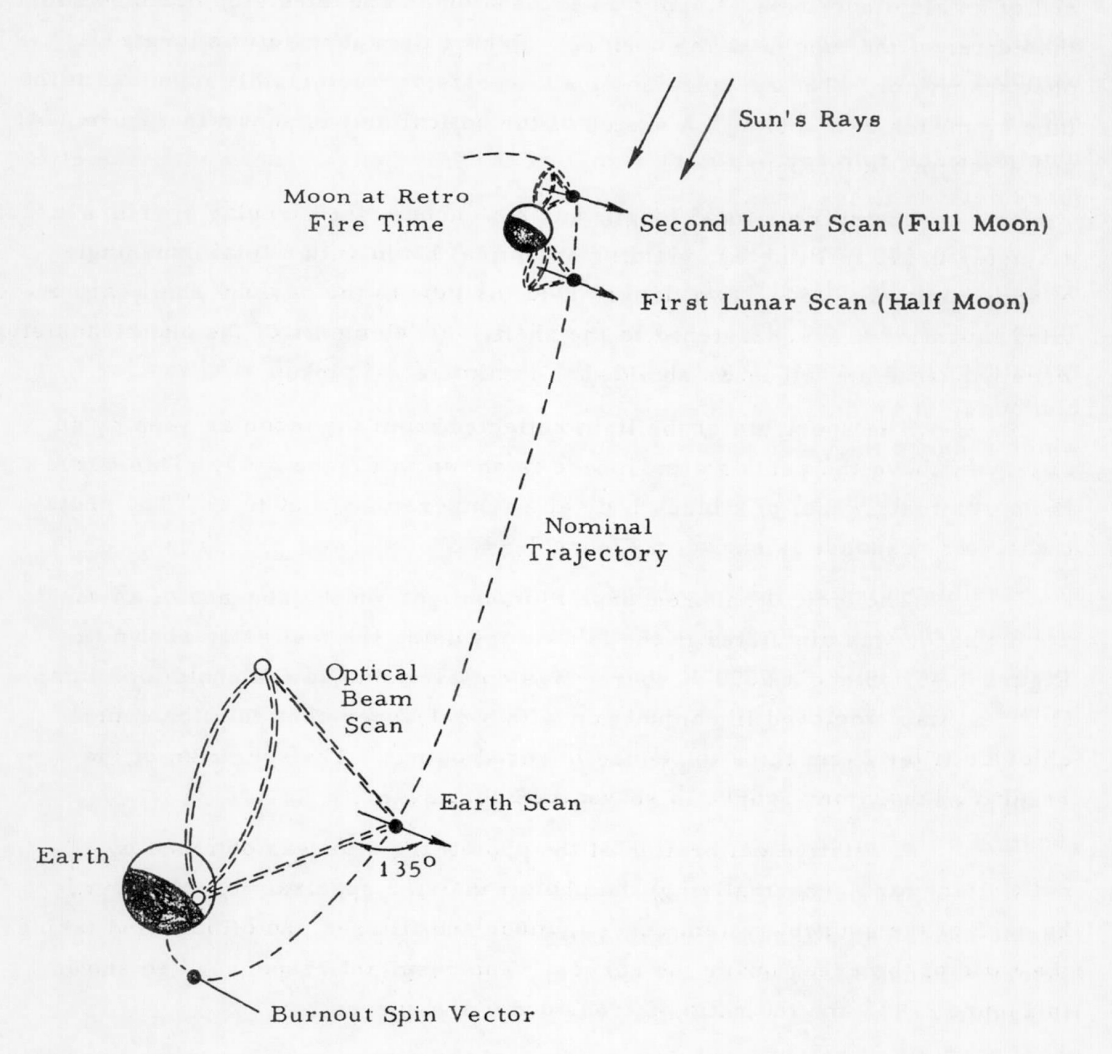
Pioneer 2 trajectory and viewing possibilities

The spacecraft was powered by nickel-cadmium batteries for ignition of the rockets, silver cell batteries for the television system, and mercury batteries for the remaining circuits. The radio transmission was at 108.06 MHz through a magnetic dipole antenna for the television system, telemetry, and doppler. Ground commands were received at 115 MHz.

The spacecraft was to be spin-stabilized at 1.8 revolutions per second, the spin direction approximately perpendicular to the geomagnetic meridian planes of the trajectory.

== Flight ==
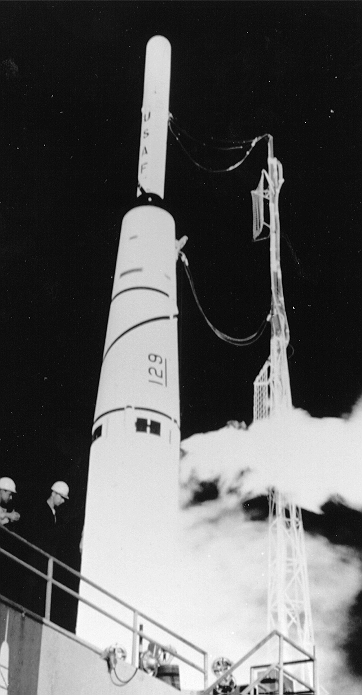
Thor-Able with Pioneer 2 spacecraft

The launch took place at 07:30:21 GMT on 8 November 1958. After Pioneer 1 had failed due to guidance system deficiencies, the guidance system was modified with a Doppler command system to ensure more accurate commands and minimize trajectory errors. Once again, the first and second stage portion of the flight was uneventful, but the third stage of the launch vehicle failed to ignite, making it impossible for Pioneer 2 to achieve orbital velocity.

An attempt to fire the vernier engines on the probe was unsuccessful and the spacecraft attained a maximum altitude of 1,550 km (960 mi) before reentering Earth's atmosphere at 28.7° N, 1.9° E over NW Africa.

A small amount of data was obtained during the short flight, including evidence that the equatorial region around Earth has higher flux and higher energy radiation than previously considered and that the micrometeorite density is higher around Earth than in space.

The reason for the third stage failure was unclear, but it was suspected that the firing command from the second stage, which contained the guidance package for the entire launch vehicle, was never received, possibly due to damage to electrical lines during staging.
