= Pioneer 0 =

1958 failed U.S. space probe

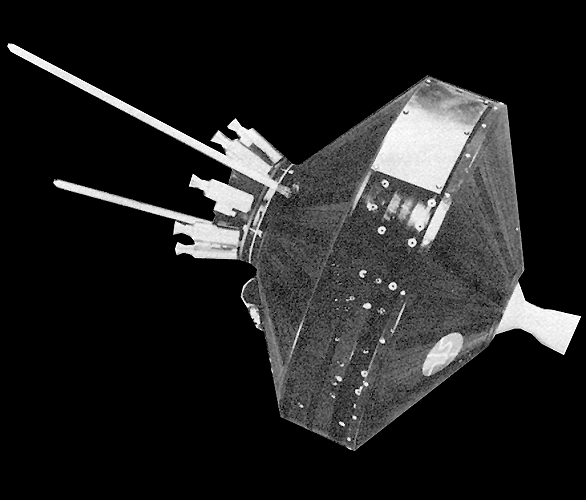
- The lunar orbiter Pioneer 0.
- Mission type: Lunar orbiter
- Operator: Air Force Ballistic Missile Division
- COSPAR ID: ABLE1
- Mission duration: 73.6 seconds Failed to orbit
- Apogee: 16 kilometers (9.9 mi)

Spacecraft properties
- Manufacturer: Space Technology Laboratories
- Launch mass: 83.8 pounds (38.0 kg)

Start of mission
- Launch date: 17 August 1958, 12:18 GMT
- Rocket: Thor DM-18 Able-I (Thor # 127)
- Launch site: Cape Canaveral, LC-17A

Instruments
- Television camera, magnetometer, micrometeoroid impact detector
- Project Able-1 Probes (USAF)

Pioneer 0 (also known as Able 1) was a failed United States space probe that was designed to go into orbit around the Moon, carrying a television camera, a micrometeorite detector and a magnetometer. It was part of the first International Geophysical Year (IGY) science payload. It was designed and operated by the Air Force Ballistic Missile Division as the first spacecraft in the Pioneer program and was the first attempted launch beyond Earth orbit by any country, but the rocket failed shortly after launch. The probe was intended to be called Pioneer (or Pioneer 1), but the launch failure precluded that name.

== Spacecraft design ==
The spacecraft consisted of a thin cylindrical midsection with a squat truncated cone frustum of 16.5 cm (6 in) high on each side. The cylinder was 74 cm (29 in) in diameter and the height from the top of one cone to the top of the opposite cone was 76 cm. Along the axis of the spacecraft and protruding from the end of the lower cone was an 11 kg (24 lb) solid propellant injection rocket and rocket case, which formed the main structural member of the spacecraft. Eight small low-thrust solid propellant velocity adjustment rockets were mounted on the end of the upper cone in a ring assembly which could be jettisoned after use. A magnetic dipole antenna also protruded from the top of the upper cone. The shell was composed of laminated plastic and was painted with a pattern of dark and light stripes to help regulate temperature.

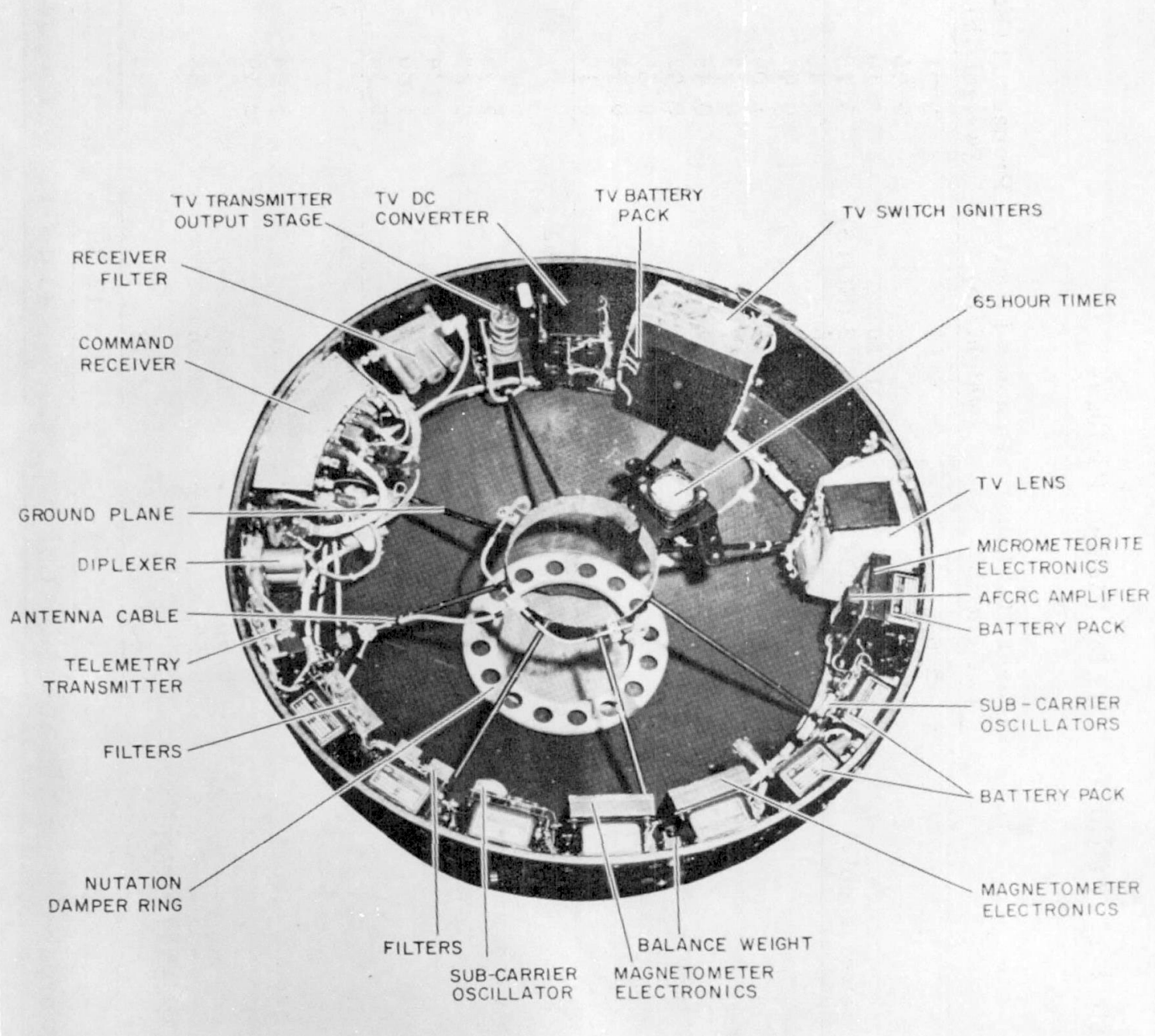
Pioneer 0 payload configuration

The scientific instrument package had a mass of 11.3 kg (25 lb) and consisted of:

- An image scanning infrared television system of the Naval Ordnance Test Station (NOTS) design to study the Moon's surface, particularly the part normally unseen from Earth.
- A diaphragm/microphone assembly to detect micrometeorites. A micrometeorite hitting the diaphragm would generate an acoustic pulse that would travel through the diaphragm to the microphone. The microphone contained a piezoelectrical crystal that rang at 100 kc under influence of the acoustic pulse. A bandpass amplifier would amplify the signal, so it could be detected.
- A search-coil magnetometer with nonlinear amplifier to measure the Earth's, Moon's and interplanetary magnetic field. At the time, it was not known whether the Moon had a magnetic field or not.

The spacecraft was powered by nickel-cadmium batteries for ignition of the rockets, silver cell batteries for the television system, and mercury batteries for the remaining circuits. Radio transmission was on 108.06 MHz, a standard frequency used by satellites in the International Geophysical Year, through an electric dipole antenna for telemetry and doppler information and a magnetic dipole antenna for the television system. Ground commands were received through the electric dipole antenna at 115 MHz. The spacecraft was to be spin-stabilized at 1.8 revolutions per second, the spin direction approximately perpendicular to the geomagnetic meridian planes of the trajectory.

== Launch and failure ==
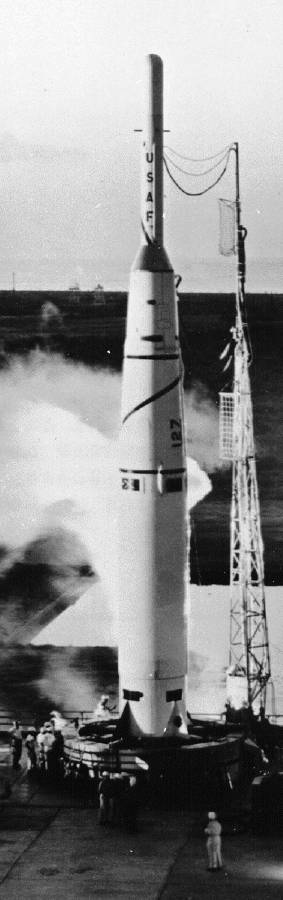
Launch of Pioneer 0

Pioneer 0 was launched on Thor missile number 127 at 12:18:00 GMT on 17 August 1958 by the Air Force Ballistic Missile Division, only 4 minutes after the scheduled launch time. It was destroyed by an explosion of the first stage of the Thor booster, 73.6 seconds after lift-off at 15.2 km (9.4 mi) altitude, 16 km (10 mi) downrange over the Atlantic Ocean. The failure was suspected to be due to a turbopump bearing that came loose, causing the liquid oxygen pump to stop. The abrupt loss of thrust caused the Thor to lose attitude control and pitch downward, which caused the LOX tank to rupture from aerodynamic loads and resulting in complete destruction of the launch vehicle. Erratic telemetry signals were received from the payload and upper stages for 123 seconds after the explosion, and the upper stages were tracked to impact in the ocean. The original plan was for the spacecraft to travel for 2.6 days to the Moon, at which time a TX-8-6 solid-propellant motor would fire to put it into a 29,000 km (18,000 mi) lunar orbit which was to nominally last for about two weeks. Air Force officials stated that they were not surprised at the failure, adding that "it would have been more of a shock had the mission succeeded." It was the only mission in the Project Able-1 Probes (USAF) entirely run by the Air Force Ballistic Missile Division, as subsequent missions were conducted by NASA.
