= Pioneer 1 =

Failed NASA orbiter mission to the Moon (1958)

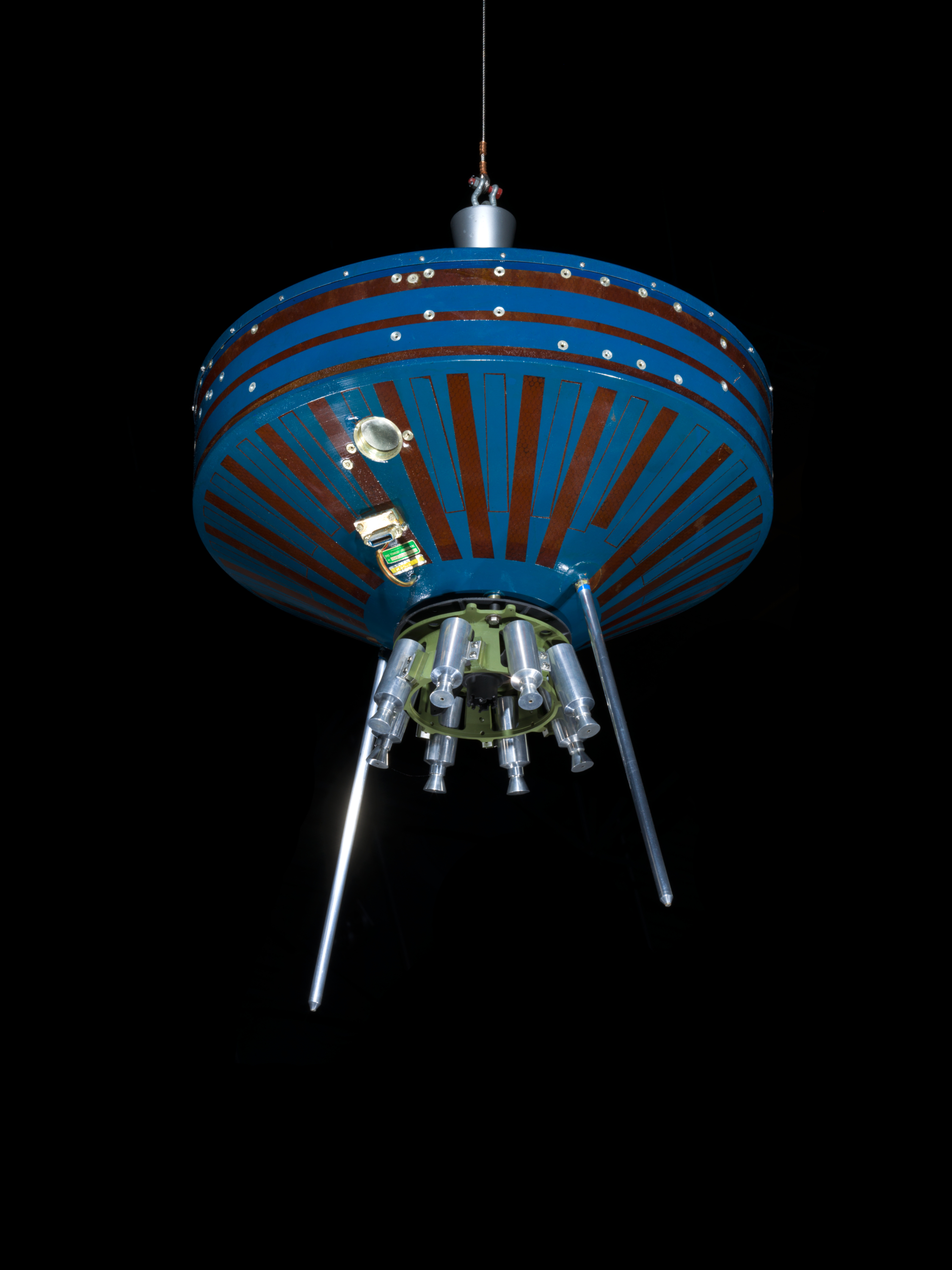
- Reconstructed replica of Pioneer 1
- Mission type: Lunar orbiter
- Operator: NASA
- Harvard designation: 1958 Eta 1
- COSPAR ID: 1958-007A
- SATCAT no.: 110
- Mission duration: 1 day, 19 hours and 4 minutes
- Apogee: 113,800 kilometers (70,700 mi)

Spacecraft properties
- Manufacturer: Space Technology Laboratories
- Launch mass: 34.2 kilograms (75 lb)
- Dry mass: 23.2 kilograms (51 lb)

Start of mission
- Launch date: 11 October 1958, 08:42:13 GMT
- Rocket: Thor DM-18 Able I
- Launch site: Cape Canaveral, LC-17A

End of mission
- Decay date: 13 October 1958, 03:46 GMT

Pioneer 1 (also known as Able 2) was an American space probe, the first under the auspices of NASA, which was launched by a Thor-Able rocket on 11 October 1958. It was intended to orbit the Moon and make scientific measurements, but due to a guidance error failed to achieve lunar orbit and was ultimately destroyed upon reentering Earth's atmosphere. The flight, which lasted 43 hours and reached an apogee of 113,800 km (70,700 miles), was the second and most successful of the three Thor-Able space probes.

== Spacecraft design ==
Pioneer 1 was fabricated by Space Technology Laboratories, a division of Ramo-Wooldridge Corp (later TRW Inc.), and consisted of a thin cylindrical midsection with a squat truncated cone on each side. The cylinder was 74 cm (29 in) in diameter and the height from the top of one cone to the top of the opposite cone was 76 cm (30 in). Along the axis of the spacecraft and protruding from the end of the lower cone was an 11 kg (24 lb) solid propellant injection rocket and rocket case, which formed the main structural member of the spacecraft. Eight small low-thrust solid propellant velocity adjustment rockets were mounted on the end of the upper cone in a ring assembly which could be jettisoned after use. A magnetic dipole antenna also protruded from the top of the upper cone. The shell was composed of laminated plastic. The total mass of the spacecraft after vernier separation was 34.2 kg (75 lb), after injection rocket firing it would have been 23.2 kg (51 lb).

The three-stage Thor-Able vehicle consisted of a modified Air Force Thor IRBM (liquid propellant, thrust about 69,400 kg (153,000 lb)) as the first stage. A liquid-propellant rocket engine powered the second stage (modified Vanguard second stage, thrust about 3,402 kg (7,500 lb)). The third stage was a solid-propellant unit based on Vanguard design, rated at 116,500 lb (52,844 kg)-sec total impulse.

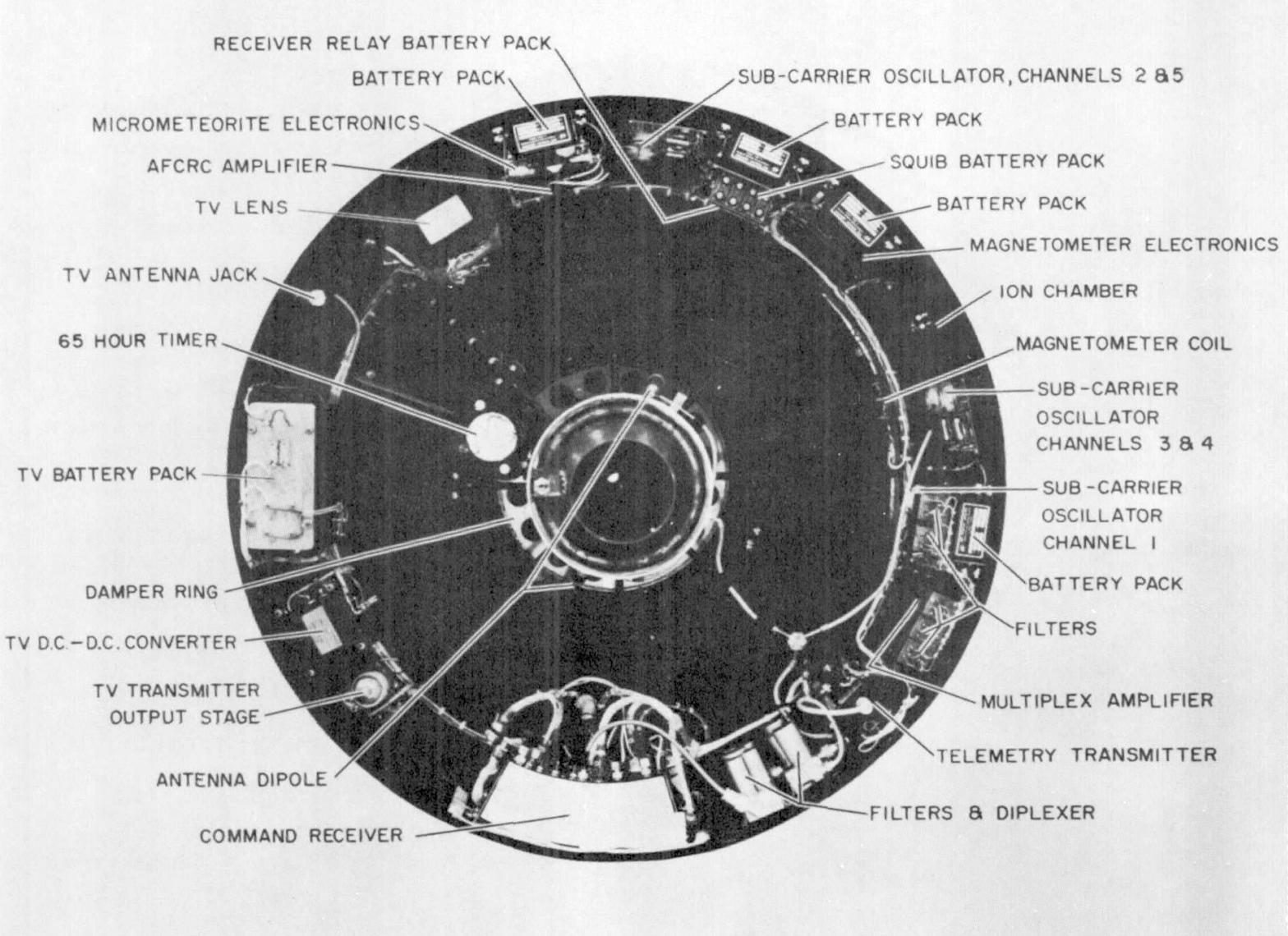
Pioneer 1 payload configuration

=== Scientific Instruments ===
The scientific instrument package had a mass of 17.8 kg (39 lb) and consisted of an image scanning infrared television system to study the Moon's surface to a resolution of 0.5°, an ionization chamber to measure radiation in space, a diaphragm/microphone assembly to detect micrometeorites, a spin-coil magnetometer to measure magnetic fields to 5 microgauss, and temperature-variable resistors to record the spacecraft's internal conditions. The spacecraft was powered by nickel-cadmium batteries for ignition of the rockets, silver cell batteries for the television system, and mercury batteries for the remaining circuits. The radio transmission was on 108.06 MHz through an electric dipole antenna for telemetry and doppler information at 300 mW and a magnetic dipole antenna for the television system at 50 W. Ground commands were received through the electric dipole antenna at 115 MHz. The spacecraft was spin-stabilized at 1.8 rps, the spin direction was approximately perpendicular to the geomagnetic meridian planes of the trajectory.

== Mission ==
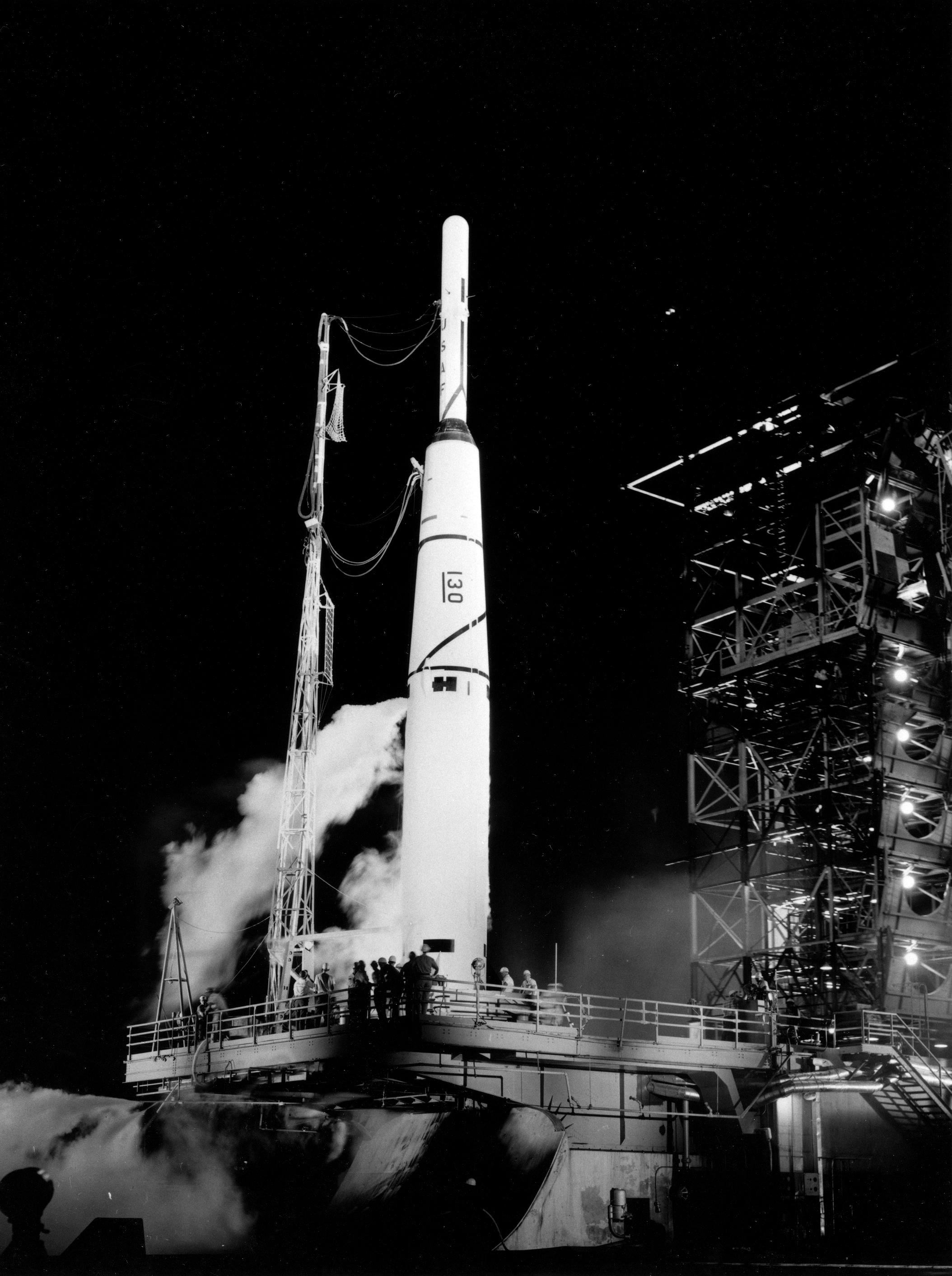
The Pioneer 1 atop its launcher.

Two days after the failure of Pioneer 0 on 17 August 1958, Thor 129, the backup vehicle, was erected on LC-17B in preparation for a September attempt. The postflight investigation of Pioneer 0 pointed to a turbopump failure, which had also caused the loss of Thor-Able 116 in April. This was followed by the failure of an Atlas launch on 18 September, so the Air Force moved to replace the turbopumps in their inventory of Thor and Atlas missiles. Thor 129 was pulled from the pad for modifications and replaced with Thor 130.

On 11 October 1958, Pioneer 1 lifted off smoothly, but the guidance system steered the Thor slightly too high and fast, causing the second stage to be lofted 3° higher than intended. As a result, it shut off 10 seconds earlier than planned, and also bumped the third stage during separation. The third stage was left pitched up about 15° and suffering a velocity shortfall of about 500 feet per second. The vernier engines on the third stage were fired to make up for the thrust deficit, but added only 150 feet per second of velocity, insufficient to escape Earth orbit. As a last resort, ground controllers decided that if they could not get Pioneer 1 to the Moon, they would place it in a high Earth orbit by firing the attached solid rocket motor. The inaccurate launch trajectory, however, had placed the probe on an orbital track that resulted in thermal heating and cooling beyond what the primitive temperature control system could handle. The probe's internals fell to near-freezing temperatures, rendering the solid motor igniter inoperable. Pioneer 1 reached a total distance of 113,800 km (70,712 mi) at 11:42 UT launch day before beginning its descent back to Earth.

The spacecraft was launched from LC-17A at Cape Canaveral at 08:42:00 GMT but it did not reach the Moon as planned due to a programming error in the upper stage causing a slight error in burnout velocity and angle (3.5°). This resulted in a ballistic trajectory with a peak altitude of 113,800 km (70,712 mi) around 13:00 local time. The real-time transmission was obtained for about 75% of the flight, but the percentage of data recorded for each experiment was variable. Except for the first hour of flight, the signal-to-noise ratio was good. The spacecraft ended transmission when it reentered the Earth's atmosphere after 43 hours of flight on 13 October 1958 at 03:46 GMT over the South Pacific Ocean. A small quantity of useful scientific information was returned, showing the radiation surrounding Earth was in the form of bands and measuring the extent of the bands, mapping the total ionizing flux, making the first observations of hydromagnetic oscillations of the magnetic field, and taking the first measurements of the density of micrometeorites and the interplanetary magnetic field.

== See also ==
- Pioneer program
