= SOLRAD 7B =

Solar monitoring satellite

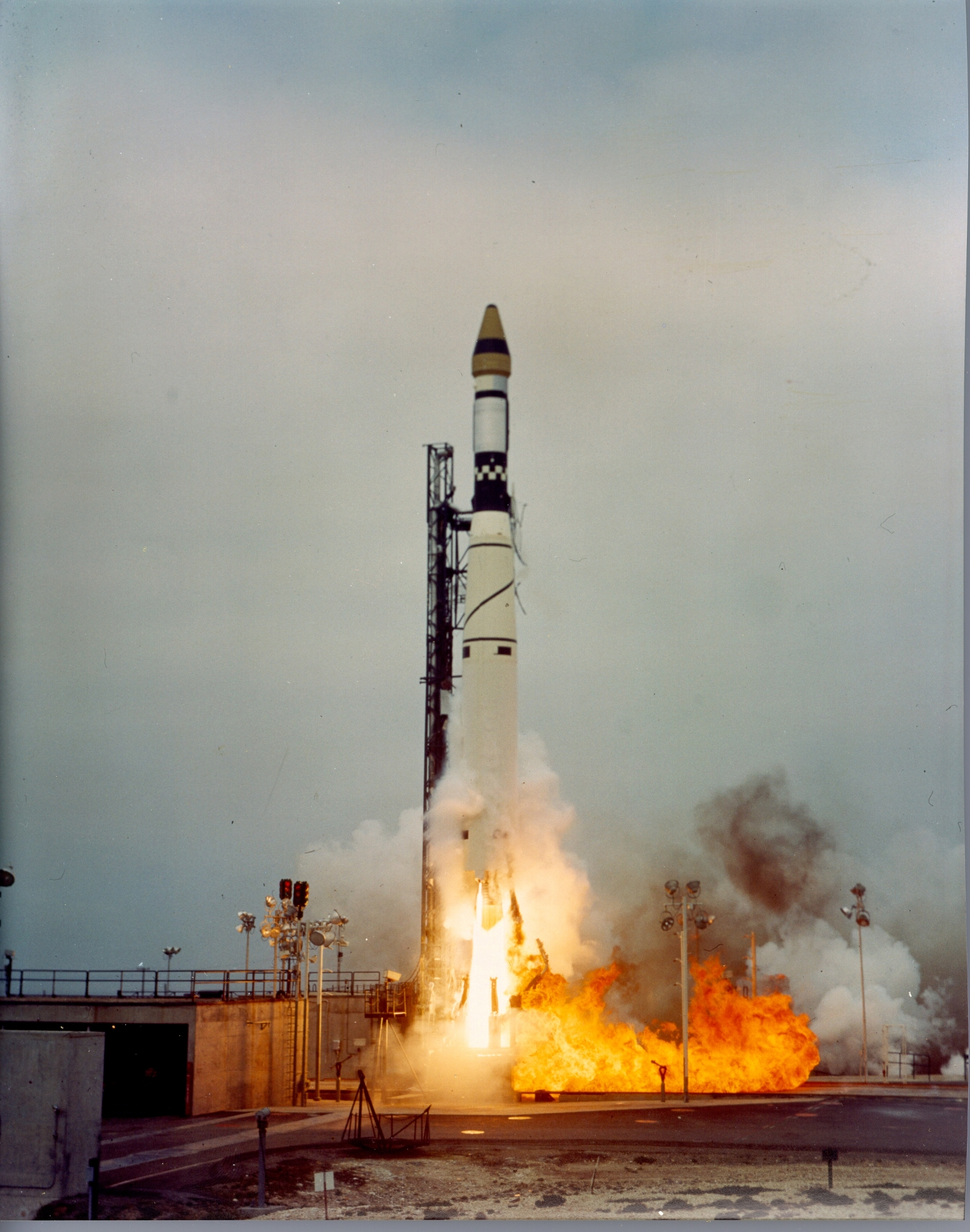
- Launch of NRL Composite 5 carrying SOLRAD 7B
- Mission type: Solar X-Ray
- Operator: NRL
- COSPAR ID: 1965-016D
- SATCAT no.: 1965-016D

Spacecraft properties
- Launch mass: 47 kilograms (104 lb)

Start of mission
- Launch date: March 9, 1965 18:29:47 UTC
- Rocket: Thor Augmented Delta-Agena D
- Launch site: Vandenberg Air Force Base Space Launch Complex 1, Pad 2

End of mission
- Last contact: October 1965

Orbital parameters
- Reference system: Geocentric
- Regime: Low Earth
- Perigee altitude: 903 kilometers (561 mi)
- Apogee altitude: 931 kilometers (578 mi)
- Inclination: 70.1°
- Period: 103.4

SOLRAD 7B was the eighth solar X-Ray monitoring satellite in the SOLRAD series and the fifth to successfully orbit the Earth. It was launched via Thor Augmented Delta-Agena D along with seven other satellites on March 9, 1965. The satellite provided continuous coverage of the Sun during the International Quiet Solar Year from March through October 1965.

== History ==
The SOLRAD science satellite program was conceived in 1958 to observe the Sun in the X-ray spectrum. It was quickly combined, to provide civilian cover (launches being unclassified at that time), with the concurrently conceived United States Naval Research Laboratory's GRAB satellite project, which would collect information on foreign radars and communications installations. There were five SOLRAD/GRAB missions between 1960 and 1962, with the scientific SOLRAD experiments sharing satellite space with GRAB's intelligence payload. Two of the missions were successful.

In 1962, all U.S. overhead reconnaissance projects were consolidated under the National Reconnaissance Office (NRO), which elected to continue and expand the GRAB mission starting July 1962 with a next-generation set of satellites, code-named POPPY. With the initiation of POPPY, SOLRAD experiments would no longer be carried on electronic spy satellites; rather, they would now get their own satellites, launched alongside POPPY missions to provide some measure of mission cover.

The first POPPY mission was launched on December 13, 1962, along with several other satellites on a mission similar to that of SOLRAD 3, complete with an Injun ionospheric research satellite. The mission was successful, despite POPPY 1's elliptical (rather than the planned circular) orbit, and data was returned for 28 months. No SOLRAD was launched concurrent with this first POPPY mission.

SOLRAD 6, the first of the second-generation SOLRADs, was launched alongside POPPY 2 on June 15, 1963, but decayed into the atmosphere on August 1, 1963, returning little data.

SOLRAD 7A (sometimes called SOLRAD 6), launched January 11, 1964, was far more successful, returning data that caused dramatic revision of models of the solar corona.

== Spacecraft ==
SOLRAD 7B (sometimes called SOLRAD 7) was designed to monitor the soft component of solar X-rays (.5 to 60 Å) and the low-frequency portion of the solar hydrogen Lyman-alpha emission spectrum (1225 to 1350 Å), and to transmit measurements back to earth. To that end, it was equipped with six ion chambers to monitor solar X-Rays in the wavelength ranges of .5-3 Å, 1–8, 8–12 Å, and 44–60 Å. The satellite was not spin-stabilized, utilizing two photocells to report the satellite's solar aspect angle (the angle between the equatorial plane and the direction from the sun to the satellite) so that data could be properly interpreted. Like the previous SOLRAD satellites, SOLRAD 7B lacked data storage capabilities, all results being transmitted in real time. International institutions were invited to receive the data, and this expanded the network of stations receiving results beyond SOLRAD 7A's. One such station was the Arcetri Observatory in Italy.

== Mission and results ==
SOLRAD 7B flew on the NRL Composite 5 mission, which lofted an unprecedented eight satellites on a single Thor Augmented Delta-Agena D rocket (including POPPY 4, an electronic signals intelligence (ELINT) surveillance package, GGSE-2, GGSE-3, Surcal 2B, SECOR 3, OSCAR 3, and Dodedcapole 1) on March 9, 1965, from Vandenberg Air Force Base Space Launch Complex 1, Pad 2. Its orbit was nearly circular at around 900 kilometers (560 mi) in altitude. SOLRAD 7B's spin axis was roughly perpendicular to the sun-satellite direction with an initial spin rate of about two revolutions per second.

SOLRAD 7B returned data from launch through October 1965, allowing it to contribute to the International Quiet Solar Year, an international scientific program mounted to gather information about the Sun during the nadir of its 11-year luminosity cycle (Jan. 1, 1964, through Dec. 31, 1965). The operational period allowed monitoring of the Sun to continue almost without interruption after SOLRDAD 7B's predecessor, SOLRAD 7A, ceased transmitting usable data on February 5, 1965.

== Legacy and Status ==
The satellite is still in orbit and its position can be tracked online, with COSPAR satellite ID 1965-016D. It intermittently transmits at 136.8MHz.
