= SOLRAD =

Series of American satellites

SOLRAD (short for "solar radiation") was an American series of satellites sponsored by the US Navy in a program to continuously monitor the Sun. SOLRAD was the Naval Research Laboratory's first post-Vanguard satellite.

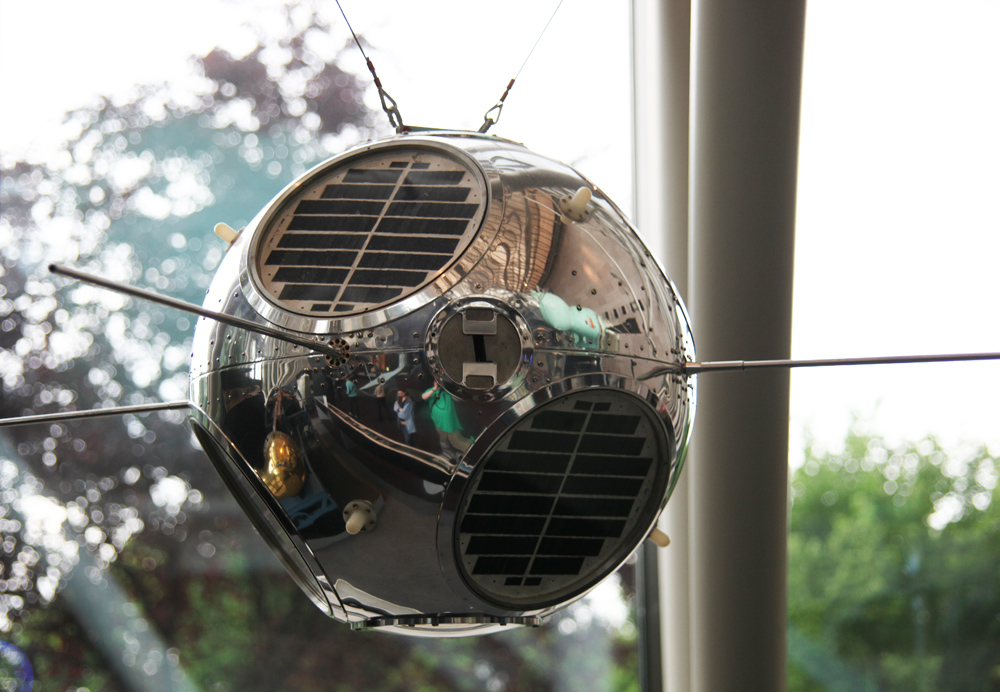
A first-series SOLRAD/GRAB

== Background ==
Until the Kennedy administration, American satellite launches were unclassified. As a result, the United States Air Force and the Navy found themselves in the awkward position of wanting to orbit spy satellites but not reveal their nature to potential enemies. Just as the Air Force elected to pair their capsule film recovery satellites with biological payloads under the Discoverer program, so did the Navy develop a scientific cover for its GRAB series of radio/radar surveillance (ELINT) satellites.

The field of solar X-ray astronomy lent itself well to such an application. As the Earth's atmosphere absorbs extraterrestrial X-ray sources (of which the Sun is by far the most prominent), it is necessary to send sensors high in or above the atmosphere to detect them. Otherwise, a vast spectrum of solar output is unavailable to Earthbound scientists.

Thus, the GRAB satellites would be equipped with X-ray sensors such that they could conduct publicly available scientific research while secretly spying on other countries' military installations. Moreover, through continuous observation of the Sun, the SOLRAD satellites would help the military better understand the effect of solar activity (including solar flares) on radio communications.

== Development ==
When the National Aeronautics and Space Administration was established on July 29, 1958, most of the NRL Vanguard group's 200 scientists and engineers became the core of NASA's spaceflight activities (though the group remained housed at NRL until the new facilities at the Goddard Space Flight Center in Beltsville, Md. became available in September 1960).

Despite this exodus, NRL satellite and space-based research continued. Through the advocacy of NRL engineer Martin Votaw, a small contingent of remaining NRL rocket scientists and technicians regrouped to form the Satellite Techniques Branch headed by Votaw.

Their first project was SOLRAD. The new branch was tasked with creating the engineering hardware of the "satellite bus," responsible for the structure, power supply, command, telemetry and the coordination of a satellite, along with its interface with the booster. The branch also handled any special circuitry needed to support the satellite payload.

The SOLRADs were not a standardized series of satellites. The first five SOLRADs, launched 1960–1962, were scientific payloads aboard GRAB ELINT satellites, whose primary mission was to monitor foreign radar and communications systems. Starting in 1963, the next three SOLRADs were stand-alone satellites co-launched with next-generation POPPY surveillance satellites, and beginning with SOLRAD 8, in 1965, SOLRADs were launched alone under the auspices of the Explorer program.

== Launches ==
Name	Launch date	International Designators	Other names	Launch vehicle
SOLRAD mass simulator	13 April 1960	1960-003C	–	Thor DM-21 Ablestar
SOLRAD 1	22 June 1960	1960-007B	GRAB-1	Thor DM-21 Ablestar
SOLRAD 2	30 November 1960 (failed launch)	SRD-2	GRAB-2	Thor DM-21 Ablestar
SOLRAD 3	29 June 1961	1961-015B	GRAB-3a, Injun 1	Thor DM-21 Ablestar
SOLRAD 4	24 January 1962 (failed launch)		GRAB, Injun 2	Thor DM-21 Ablestar
SOLRAD 4B	26 April 1962 (failed launch)	SRAD4B	GRAB-3b	Scout X-2
SOLRAD 5	Not launched	–	GRAB	–
SOLRAD 6	15 June 1963	1963-021C	Solrad 6A	Thor-Agena D
SOLRAD 7A	11 January 1964	1964-001D	Solrad 6	Thor Augmented Delta-Agena D
SOLRAD 7B	9 March 1965	1965-016D	–	Thor Augmented Delta-Agena D
SOLRAD 8	19 November 1965	1965-093A	Explorer 30	Scout X-4
SOLRAD 9	5 March 1968	1968-017A	Explorer 37	Scout B-1 S160C
SOLRAD 10	9 July 1971	1971-058A	Explorer 44	Scout B S177C
SOLRAD 11A	14 March 1976	1976-023C		Titan IIIC
SOLRAD 11B	14 March 1976	1976-023D		Titan IIIC
SOLRAD 11C	Not launched	SRD-11C		–
