= SOLRAD 4B =

American surveillance satellite

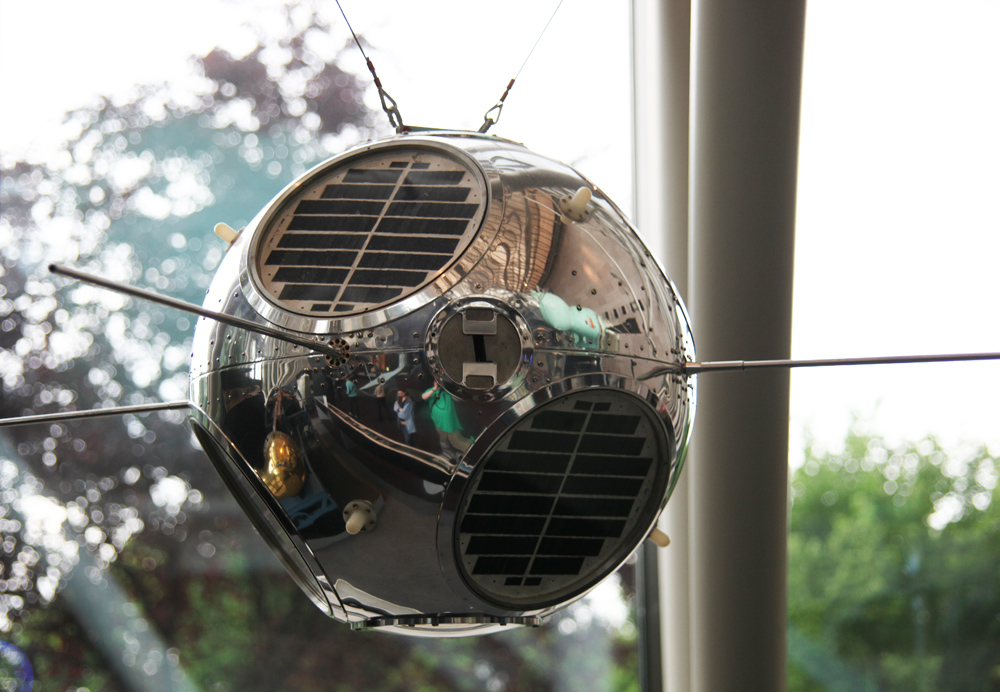
- SOLRAD 4B reserve satellite (similar to SOLRAD 4)
- Names: GRAB 5 SOLar RADiation 4B; SR 4B; GREB 5
- Mission type: Solar X-rays
- Operator: United States Naval Research Laboratory (USNRL)
- COSPAR ID: 1962-F03 (SRAD4B)
- Mission duration: Failed to orbit

Spacecraft properties
- Spacecraft type: SOLRAD
- Manufacturer: Naval Research Laboratory (NRL)
- Launch mass: 25 kg (55 lb)
- Dimensions: 51 cm (20 in)

Start of mission
- Launch date: 24 April 1962, 10:49 GMT
- Rocket: Scout X-2
- Launch site: Vandenberg Air Force Base, Western Test Range
- Contractor: Douglas Aircraft Company

End of mission
- Decay date: Failed to orbit

Orbital parameters
- Reference system: Geocentric orbit (planned)
- Regime: Low Earth orbit
- Perigee altitude: 930 km
- Apogee altitude: 930 km
- Inclination: 66.80°
- Period: 103.00 minutes

SOLRAD 4B (from "solar radiation") was a solar X-ray, ultraviolet, and electronic surveillance satellite. Developed by the United States Navy's United States Naval Research Laboratory, it was the fifth in both the SOLRAD and the GRAB (Galactic Radiation And Background) programs.

This satellite was the only SOLRAD to be launched from Vandenberg Air Force Base, to be launched via Scout rocket, and to be launched unaccompanied by any other satellites. Launched on 26 April 1962, a fourth stage failure resulted in payload impact at 225 nautical miles of the downrange. SOLRAD 4B was the last of the SOLRAD/GRAB missions, future SOLRADs being launched with the National Reconnaissance Office's (NRO) next-generation POPPY satellites.

== Background ==
The United States Navy's Naval Research Laboratory (NRL) established itself as a player early in the Space Race with the development and management of Project Vanguard (1956–1959), America's first satellite program. After Vanguard, the Navy's next major goal was to use the observational high ground of Earth's orbit to survey Soviet radar locations and frequencies. This first space surveillance project was called "GRAB", later expanded into the more innocuous backronym, Galactic Radiation and Background. As American space launches were not classified until late 1961, a cover mission sharing the satellite bus was desired to conceal GRAB's electronic surveillance mission from its intended targets.

The field of solar astronomy provided such cover. Since the invention of the rocket, astronomers had wanted to fly instruments above the atmosphere to get a better look at the Sun. The Earth's atmosphere blocks large sections of sunlight's electromagnetic spectrum, making it impossible to study the Sun's X-ray and ultraviolet output from the ground. Without this critical information, it was difficult to model the Sun's internal processes, which in turn inhibited stellar astronomy in general. On a more practical level, it was believed that solar flares directly affected the Earth's thermosphere, disrupting radio communications. The U.S. Navy wanted to know when its communications were going to become unreliable or compromised. Sounding rockets had shown that solar output was unpredictable and fluctuated rapidly. A long-term, real-time observation platform above the Earth's atmosphere – in other words, a satellite – was required to properly chart the Sun's radiation, determine its effects on the Earth, and correlate it with ground-based observations of the Sun in other wavelengths of light.

Thus, the SOLRAD project was conceived to address several NRL goals at once:

- to make the first long-term continuous observations of the Sun in ultraviolet and X-ray light, and to correlate these measurements with ground-based observations.
- to evaluate the level of hazard posed by ultraviolet and X-ray radiation.
- to better understand the effect of solar activity (including solar flares) on radio communications.
- to cheaply and efficiently produce a satellite for the GRAB surveillance mission by using a proven design.
- to obscure the GRAB mission under a scientific cover.

SOLRAD 4B had two successful predecessors in SOLRAD 1 and SOLRAD 3, both of which made significant contributions to the understanding of ultraviolet and X-ray astronomy in the previous two years, and which returned an abundance of intelligence on Soviet air defense radar installations. SOLRAD 4B's immediate predecessor, SOLRAD 4, failed to make it to orbit on 26 January 1962, due to a faulty booster.

== Spacecraft ==
SOLRAD 4B was a functional duplicate of SOLRAD 4: roughly spherical, modeled on the Vanguard satellite (which also had been developed by the Naval Research Laboratory). The satellite included both scientific SOLRAD and electronic surveillance GRAB packages within the same body. Mass of 25 kg, the fifth in the SOLRAD series was more heavily instrumented than prior SOLRADS. Instead of one X-ray photometer, like SOLRAD 1 and SOLRAD 2, or two, like SOLRAD 3, it carried four X-ray photometers, allowing it to detect more intense and higher energy X-rays. Three of the photometers were shielded against Van Allen radiation belts (which could spoil results) by magnets, as had been done on earlier missions. The fourth was protected by a beryllium shield. It was hoped that SOLRAD 4B would not only conduct basic research into solar X-ray astronomy, but also determine the hazard hard X-rays posed to astronauts and satellites.

Another point of difference between SOLRAD 4B and SOLRAD 1 to 3 was its four Lyman-alpha detectors. Used for measuring ultraviolet radiation, two such detectors had been included on SOLRAD 1 and SOLRAD 2 to determine the impact of solar ultraviolet on radio reception. None had been measured, and the detectors had been deleted from SOLRAD 3. They were reinstated on SOLRAD 4 and SOLRAD 4B not for solar study, but for night-time measurement to see if ambient Lyman-alpha radiation constituted a threat to astronauts and satellites.

== Mission ==
On 26 April 1962 at 10:49 GMT, Scout X-2 #111 blasted off from Vandenberg Air Force Base Western Test Range. A lack of attitude gas in the Scout's 4th stage caused the payload to crash at 225 nautical miles downrange.

== Legacy ==
SOLRAD 4B was the final flight of the SOLRAD/GRAB series. A subsequent SOLRAD/GRAB mission ("SOLRAD 5") was cancelled and the satellite intended for the mission was ultimately donated to the National Air and Space Museum in 2002.

In 1962, all U.S. overhead reconnaissance projects were consolidated under the National Reconnaissance Office (NRO), which elected to continue and expand the GRAB mission starting July 1962 with a next-generation set of satellites, code-named POPPY. With the initiation of POPPY, SOLRAD experiments would no longer be carried on electronic spy satellites; rather, they would now get their own satellites, launched alongside POPPY missions to provide some measure of mission cover. Starting with SOLRAD 8, launched in November 1965, the final five SOLRAD satellites were scientific satellites launched singly, three of which were also given NASA Explorer program numbers. The last in this final series of SOLRAD satellites flew in 1976. In all, there were thirteen operational satellites in the SOLRAD series. The GRAB program was declassified in 1998.

== See also ==
- General information on the SOLRAD project
- General information on the GRAB project
