= GGSE-1 =

Experimental satellite

- Names: Gravity Gradient Stabilization Experiment-1
- Mission type: Technology; Gravity-gradient stabilization
- Operator: U.S. Navy
- COSPAR ID: 1964-001B
- SATCAT no.: 00728

Spacecraft properties
- Launch mass: 39 kg (86 lb)

Start of mission
- Launch date: 11 January 1964, 20:07 GMT
- Rocket: Thor Augmented Delta-Agena D
- Launch site: Vandenberg, Pad 75-3-5
- Contractor: Douglas Aircraft Company

Orbital parameters
- Reference system: Geocentric orbit
- Regime: Low Earth orbit
- Perigee altitude: 902 km (560 mi)
- Apogee altitude: 924 km (574 mi)
- Inclination: 69.90°
- Period: 103.30 minutes
- Gravity Gradient Stabilization Experiment

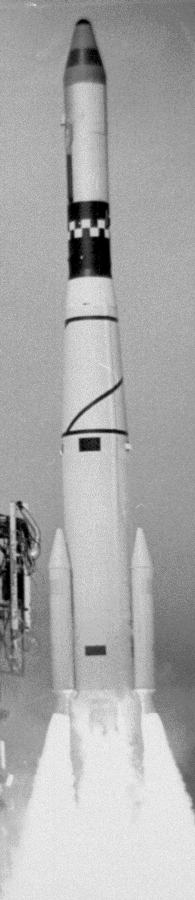
Launch of GGSE-1 satellite

The Gravity Gradient Stabilization Experiment (GGSE-1) was a technology satellite launched simultaneously with four other satellites (including SOLRAD 7A and POPPY 3) on 11 January 1964 by the U.S. military from Vandenberg Air Force Base aboard a Thor Augmented Delta-Agena D rocket. It demonstrated a new oscillation damping system intended for use in reconnaissance satellites.

== Background ==
GGSE-1 was the first in a series of technology satellites that tested designs and deployment techniques later applied to the Naval Ocean Surveillance System NOSS/Whitecloud reconnaissance satellites.

== Spacecraft ==
GGSE-1 was an ovoid satellite based on a similar bus to SOLRAD 7A, with which it was launched into orbit. GGSE-1 was equipped with a passive oscillatory damping mechanism attached to the spacecraft via an 8.5 m (28 ft) rod of metal tape. The entire mechanism and rod together weighed less than 4.5 kg (9.9 lb).

The damping mechanism, developed by General Electric, was a metal sphere, 12.7 cm (5.0 in) in diameter, containing another metal sphere with a silicone damping fluid between. A small bar magnet attached to the inner sphere aligned that sphere with the Earth's magnetic field. As the satellite oscillated about its local vertical because of gravity gradient forces, the outer sphere of the damper rotated about the inner sphere, dissipating the oscillatory energy in the form of heat from the viscous drag of the fluid.

This system was more effective than the damping spring-and-weight system used on a previously launched Transit satellite in that it provided equal damping about all three axes of the satellite while the older damper provided no damping about the yaw axis and less damping of the roll axis than for pitch. The new damper also was effective immediately whereas the older technique required several weeks for the spring-mass to compress into operational position.

== Mission ==
Launched on 11 January 1964 at 20:07 GMT, along with four other spacecraft aboard a Thor Augmented Delta-Agena D, (including SOLRAD 7A and POPPY 3) GGSE-1 worked as hoped. Its stabilization system successfully oriented the satellite to a local vertical within 5° of accuracy and damped out oscillations within three days of orbit.

== Status ==
As of 3 February 2021, GGSE-1 is still in orbit and its position can be tracked.
