= SOLRAD 2 =

U.S. satellite launched in 1960

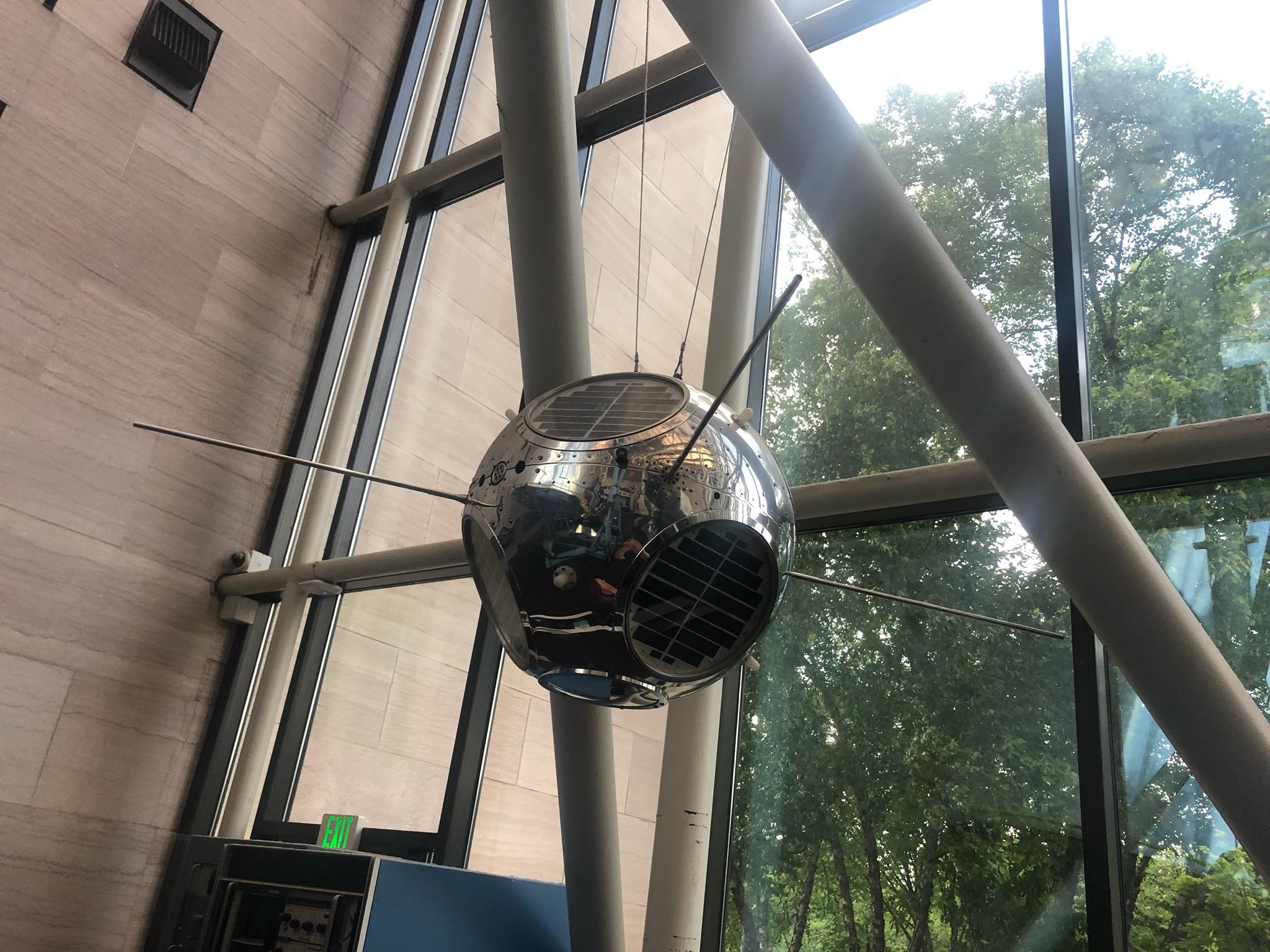
- SOLRAD reserve satellite (similar to SOLRAD 2)
- Names: GRAB (2); SOLar RADiation 2 SR 2 GREB (2)
- Mission type: Solar X-rays
- Operator: Naval Research Laboratory (USNRL)
- COSPAR ID: 1960-F16 (SRD-2)
- Mission duration: Failed to orbit

Spacecraft properties
- Spacecraft type: SOLRAD
- Manufacturer: Naval Research Laboratory (USNRL)
- Launch mass: 18 kg (40 lb)
- Dimensions: 51 cm (20 in) of diameter
- Power: 6 watts

Start of mission
- Launch date: 30 November 1960, 19:50 GMT
- Rocket: Thor-Ablestar
- Launch site: Cape Canaveral, LC-17B
- Contractor: Douglas Aircraft Company

End of mission
- Destroyed: Failed to orbit

Orbital parameters
- Reference system: Geocentric orbit (planned)
- Regime: Low Earth orbit
- Perigee altitude: 930 km (580 mi)
- Apogee altitude: 930 km (580 mi)
- Inclination: 66.70°
- Period: 100.0 minutes

SOLRAD 2 (from "solar radiation") was the public designation for a combination surveillance and solar X-rays and ultraviolet scientific satellite, the second in the SOLRAD program developed by the United States Navy's Naval Research Laboratory. The SOLRAD scientific package aboard the satellite provided cover for the GRAB (Galactic Radiation and Background) electronic surveillance package, the mission of which was to map the Soviet Union's air defense radar network.

SOLRAD 2 was launched along with Transit 3A atop a Thor-Ablestar rocket on 30 November 1960, but both satellites failed to reach orbit when the booster flew off course and was destroyed, raining debris over Cuba, which prompted official protests from the Cuban government. As a result, future SOLRAD flights were programmed to avoid a Cuban flyover during launch.

== Background ==
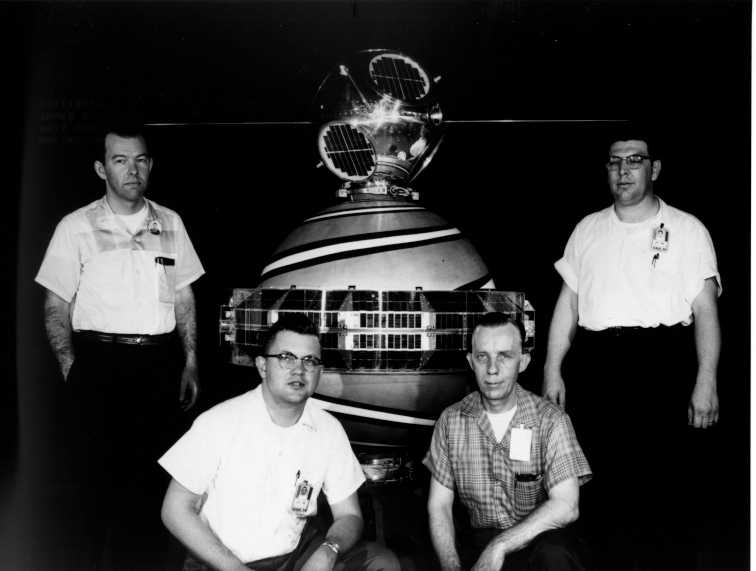
SOLRAD 1 on top of Transit 2A with four of its creators. From left: Martin J. Votaw, George G. Kronmiller, Alfred R. Conover, and Roy A. Harding.

In 1957, the Soviet Union began deploying the S-75 Dvina surface-to-air missile, controlled by Fan Song fire control radars. This development made penetration of Soviet air space by American bombers more dangerous. The U.S. Air Force began a program of cataloging the rough location and individual operating frequencies of these radars, using electronic reconnaissance aircraft flying off the borders of the Soviet Union. This program provided information on radars on the periphery of the Soviet Union, but information on the sites further inland was lacking. Some experiments were carried out using radio telescopes looking for serendipitous Soviet radar reflections off the Moon, but this proved an inadequate solution to the problem.

In March 1958, while the Naval Research Laboratory (NRL) was heavily involved in Project Vanguard, the U.S. Navy's effort to launch a satellite, NRL engineer Reid D. Mayo, determined that a Vanguard derivative could be used to map Soviet missile sites. Mayo had previously developed a system for submarines whereby they could evade anti-submarine aircraft by picking up their radar signals. Physically small and mechanically robust, it could be adapted to fit inside the small Vanguard frame.

Mayo presented the idea to Howard Lorenzen, head of the NRL's countermeasures branch. Lorenzen promoted the idea within the U.S. Department of Defense (DoD), and six months later the concept was approved under the name "Tattletale". President Eisenhower approved full development of the program on 24 August 1959.

After a news leak by The New York Times, Eisenhower cancelled the project. The project was restarted under the name "Walnut" (the satellite component given the name "DYNO".) after heightened security had been implemented, including greater oversight and restriction of access to "need-to-know" personnel. American space launches were not classified at the time, and a co-flying cover mission that would share space with DYNO was desired to conceal DYNO's electronic surveillance mission from its intended targets.

The study of the Sun's electromagnetic spectrum provided an ideal cover opportunity. The U.S. Navy had wanted to determine the role of solar flares in radio communications disruptions and the level of hazard to satellites and astronauts posed by ultraviolet and X-ray radiation. Such a study had not previously been possible as the Earth's atmosphere blocks the Sun's X-ray and ultraviolet output from ground observation. Moreover, solar output is unpredictable and fluctuates rapidly, making sub-orbital sounding rockets inadequate for the observation task. A satellite was required for long-term, continuous study of the complete solar spectrum.

Wavelengths of light blocked by Earth's atmosphere

The NRL already had a purpose-built solar observatory in the form of Vanguard 3, which had been launched in 1959. Vanguard 3 had carried X-ray and ultraviolet detectors, though they had been completely saturated by the background radiation of the Van Allen belts. Development of the DYNO satellite from the Vanguard design was managed by NRL engineer Martin Votaw, leading a team of Project Vanguard engineers and scientists who had not migrated to NASA. The dual-purpose satellite was renamed GRAB ("Galactic Radiation And Background"), sometimes referred to as GREB ("Galactic Radiation Experiment Background"), and referred to in its scientific capacity as SOLRAD ("SOLar RADiation").

A dummy mass simulator SOLRAD was successfully launched on 13 April 1960, attached to a Transit 1B, proving the dual satellite launch technique. On 5 May 1960, just four days after the downing of Gary Powers' U-2 flight over the Soviet Union highlighted the vulnerability of aircraft-based surveillance, President Eisenhower approved the launch of an operational SOLRAD satellite. SOLRAD/GRAB 1 was launched into orbit on 22 June 1960, becoming both the world's first surveillance satellite and the first satellite to observe the Sun in X-ray and ultraviolet light.

== Spacecraft ==
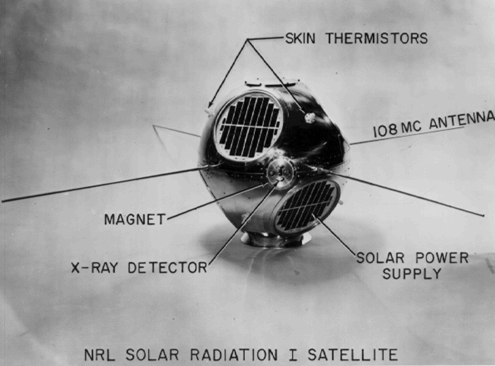
SOLRAD 1, its principal external features labeled.

SOLRAD 2 was roughly a duplicate of its predecessor, SOLRAD/GRAB 1, spherical and 51 cm (20 in) in diameter, slightly lighter than SOLRAD/GRAB 1 despite carrying the same scientific experiments (18 kg (40 lb) versus 19.05 kg (42.0 lb)), and powered by six circular patches of solar cells. The solar cells powered nine D cell batteries in series (12 volts total) providing 6 watts of power.

The satellite's SOLRAD scientific package included two Lyman-alpha photometers (nitric oxide ion chambers) for the study of ultraviolet light in the 1,050–1,350 Å wavelength range and one X-ray photometer (an argon ion chamber) in the 2–8 Å wavelength range, all mounted around the equator of the satellite. As with SOLRAD 1, permanent magnets were installed to deflect charged particles from the detector windows to address the saturation issue that had impacted the Vanguard 3 mission.

The satellite's GRAB surveillance equipment was designed to detect Soviet air defense radars broadcasting on the S-band (1,550–3,900 MHz), over a circular area 6,500 km (4,000 mi) in diameter beneath it. A receiver in the satellite was tuned to the approximate frequency of the radars, and its output was used to trigger a separate Very high frequency (VHF) transmitter in the spacecraft. As it traveled over the Soviet Union, the satellite would detect the pulses from the missile radars and immediately re-broadcast them to American ground stations within range, which would record the signals and send them to the NRL for analysis. Although GRAB's receiver was omnidirectional, by looking for the same signals on multiple passes and comparing that to the known location of the satellite, the rough location of the radars could be determined, along with their exact pulse repetition frequency.

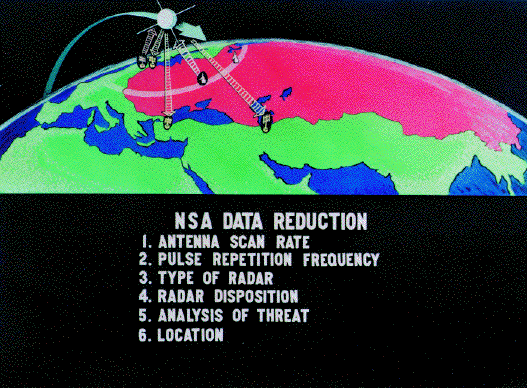
"NSA Data Reduction", indicating the intelligence to be derived by processing the satellite downlink

Telemetry was sent via four whip-style 63.5 cm (25.0 in) long antennas mounted on SOLRAD's equator. Scientific telemetry was sent on 108 MHz, the International Geophysical Year standard frequency used by Vanguard. Commands from the ground and electronic surveillance were collected via smaller antennas on 139 MHz. Data received on the ground was recorded on magnetic tape and couriered back to the NRL, where it was evaluated, duplicated, and forwarded to the National Security Agency (NSA) at Army Fort Meade, Maryland, and the Strategic Air Command (SAC) at Offut Air Force Base Omaha, Nebraska, for analysis and processing.

Like most early automatic spacecraft, SOLRAD 2, though spin stabilized, lacked active attitude control systems and thus scanned the whole sky without focusing on a particular source. So that scientists could properly interpret the source of the X-rays detected by SOLRAD 2, the spacecraft carried a vacuum photocell to determine when the Sun was striking its photometers and the angle at which sunlight hit them.

== Mission ==
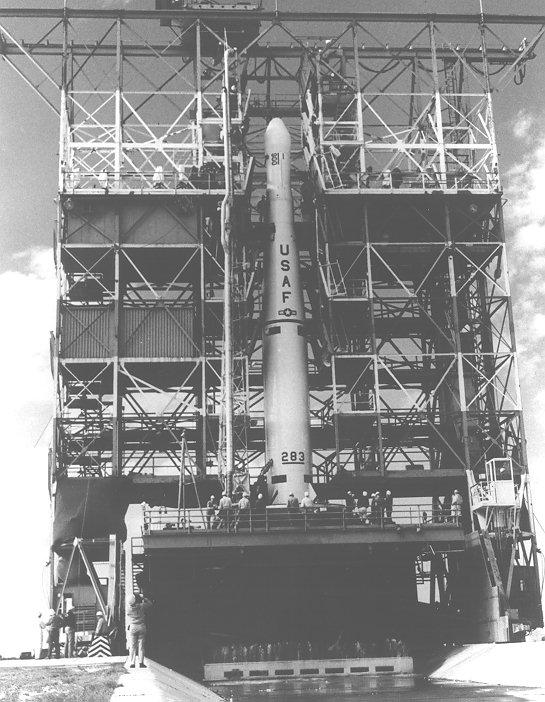
SOLRAD 2's Thor-Ablestar on launch day

In November 1960, Votaw and his 14-man team drove the technical components for the SOLRAD 2 launch (loaded in the trunks of their own cars) from NRL headquarters in Washington, D.C. to Cape Canaveral, flying having been ruled out due to the recent rash of skyjackings to Cuba. Upon arrival, the NRL team set up a temporary ground station in a hangar on the Cape's west side. SOLRAD 2's booster (first stage Thor No. 283 and second stage Able-Star 006) was erected nearly three miles away at Cape Canaveral Pad LC-17B.

On launch day, 30 November 1960, minor glitches caused so many holds in the hours-long countdown that the NRL team commissioned a betting pool as to when the launch would occur. Nevertheless, SOLRAD 2 did launch, along with Transit 3A (a separate satellite on the same rocket), at 19:50 GMT, into a sunny sky. The Thor first stage shut down prematurely (it had been scheduled to burn for 163 seconds). Out of caution, despite the possibility that its payload could still be orbited, the now separated first and second stages of the booster were destroyed by the range safety officer.

Like SOLRAD 1 (but no other American launches to date), SOLRAD 2's course to orbit took it over the Caribbean island of Cuba. As a result of the rocket's destruction, fragments fell over Cuba's Oriente Province at the eastern end of the island, northwest of the U.S. Navy's Guantanamo Bay base. The Cuban Army post at Holguín reported fragments falling along a 200 mi^{2} (518 km^{2}) swath and reported recovering "two complete sphere [sic], two apparatuses in the form of cones and various cylinders" with English inscriptions. One piece of recovered debris was described as a "sealed sphere of some 40 pounds". Given that Vanguard TV-3's satellite survived a booster explosion, it is possible that this was SOLRAD 2, recovered intact. The items were then delivered to army headquarters at Palma Soriano. According to a 1988 Chinese document, some of the recovered debris was sold to the People's Republic of China and used in aid of the design of the second stage of the CSS-4 intercontinental ballistic missile (ICBM).

The Cuban government protested the incident: Revolución, an official Cuban newspaper, accused the United States of "Yankee provocation", and government radio stations denounced what they described as efforts to destroy Castro's regime. Cuba lodged an official complaint with the United Nations. In response to these protests, American launches overflying Cuba were postponed, improvements were made to the range-safety system at Cape Canaveral, and future SOLRAD flights were programmed to follow a more northerly course to orbit during launch that did not overfly Cuba.

== Legacy ==
The SOLRAD/GRAB series flew three more times finishing with the SOLRAD 4B mission launched 26 April 1962. Of the five SOLRAD/GRAB missions, only SOLRAD/GRAB 1 and SOLRAD 3/GRAB 2 were successes, the others failing to reach orbit. In 1962, all U.S. overhead reconnaissance projects were consolidated under the National Reconnaissance Office (NRO), which elected to continue and expand the GRAB mission starting July 1962 with a next-generation set of satellites, code-named POPPY. With the initiation of POPPY, SOLRAD experiments would no longer be carried on electronic spy satellites; rather, they would now get their own satellites, launched alongside POPPY missions to provide some measure of mission cover. Starting with SOLRAD 8, launched in November 1965, the final five SOLRAD satellites were scientific satellites launched singly, three of which were also given NASA Explorer program numbers. The last in this final series of SOLRAD satellites flew in 1976. In all, there were thirteen operational satellites in the SOLRAD series. The GRAB program was declassified in 1998.

== See also ==
- General information on the SOLRAD project
- General information on the GRAB project
