= SOLRAD 7A =

Solar X-ray monitoring satellite

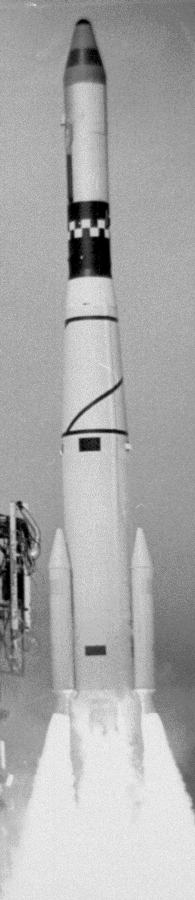
- Mission type: Solar X-Ray
- Operator: NRL
- COSPAR ID: 1964-001D
- SATCAT no.: 00730

Spacecraft properties
- Launch mass: 45.4 kilograms (100 lb)

Start of mission
- Launch date: January 11, 1964, 5:00:00 UTC
- Rocket: Thor Augmented Delta-Agena D
- Launch site: Vandenberg Air Force Base Space Launch Complex 3, Pad 5

End of mission
- Last contact: Feb. 5, 1965 (usable data); July 1966 (contact)

Orbital parameters
- Reference system: Geocentric
- Regime: Low Earth
- Perigee altitude: 903 kilometers (561 mi)
- Apogee altitude: 926 kilometers (575 mi)
- Inclination: 69.9°
- Period: 103.30 minutes

SOLRAD 7A was the seventh solar X-ray monitoring satellite in the SOLRAD series, and the fourth to successfully orbit the Earth. It was boosted into orbit along with four other military satellites atop a Thor Augmented Delta-Agena D rocket on January 11, 1964. Data returned by SOLRAD 7A dramatically revised scientific models of the solar corona.

== History ==
The SOLRAD science satellite program was conceived in 1958 to observe the Sun in the X-ray spectrum. It was quickly combined, to provide civilian cover (launches being unclassified at that time), with the concurrently conceived United States Naval Research Laboratory's GRAB satellite project, which would collect information on foreign radars and communications installations. There were five SOLRAD/GRAB missions between 1960 and 1962, with the scientific SOLRAD experiments sharing satellite space with GRAB's intelligence payload. Two of the missions were successful.

In 1962, all U.S. overhead reconnaissance projects were consolidated under the National Reconnaissance Office (NRO), which elected to continue and expand the GRAB mission starting July 1962 with a next-generation set of satellites, code-named POPPY. With the initiation of POPPY, SOLRAD experiments would no longer be carried on electronic spy satellites; rather, they would now get their own satellites, launched alongside POPPY missions to provide some measure of mission cover.

The first POPPY mission was launched on December 13, 1962, along with several other satellites on a mission similar to that of SOLRAD 3, complete with an Injun (satellite) ionospheric research satellite. The mission was successful, despite POPPY 1's elliptical (rather than the planned circular) orbit, and data was returned for 28 months. No SOLRAD was launched concurrent with this first POPPY mission.

SOLRAD 6, the first of the second-generation SOLRADs, was launched alongside POPPY 2 on June 15, 1963, but decayed into the atmosphere on August 1, 1963, returning little data.

== Spacecraft ==
SOLRAD 7A was equipped with ionization chambers to monitor solar X-Rays in the wavelength ranges of 1–8 Å, 8–12 Å, and 44–60 Å. This satellite contained five X-ray photometers, four UV photometers, and two systems to accurately determine the solar aspect angle. Its purposes were to monitor the soft component of solar X-rays (2 to 60 Å) and the low-frequency portion of the solar hydrogen Lyman-alpha emission spectrum (1225 to 1350 Å), and to transmit measurements back to Earth.

== Mission and results ==
Launched on January 11, 1964, along with four other spacecraft aboard a Thor Augmented Delta-Agena D, (including POPPY 3, an electronic signals intelligence (ELINT) surveillance package) its orbit was nearly circular at 900 kilometers (560 mi). SOLRAD 7A's spin axis was roughly perpendicular to the Sun-satellite direction with an initial spin rate of about two revolutions per second; however, the magnetic brooms produced varying torques by interacting with the Earth's magnetic field resulting in a slow precession of the spin axis.

SOLRAD 7A transmitted data in real time on 136 MHz, providing 10 to 20 minutes of data at a pass to ground stations. The satellite's 44- to 55-Å and 8- to 16-Å detectors both failed soon after launch, but data was continuously returned from its other instruments until September 1964. Sporadic data were received until February 1965. In addition to the intended recipients, several European observatories successfully recorded the telemetry. Dubbed "SOLRAD 6" by several sources, the satellite reported comparatively low solar X-ray emission levels during its time in orbit. After February 5, 1965, no usable data were obtained from the satellite, although it continued operating until July 1966.

From SOLRAD 7A data, it was concluded that the X-ray region of the solar corona was a series of small cells that flared and decayed rapidly, emitting hard X-rays in the process. This dramatically change previous models: Earthbound telescopes had only been able to detect the very hot, flashing gas those cells created, the net result making the corona seem a homogeneous region extending 1,000,000 miles (1,609,344 km) from the Sun.

The operational period of the satellite allowed it to contribute to the International Quiet Solar Year, an international scientific program mounted to gather information about the Sun during the nadir of its 11-year luminosity cycle (Jan. 1, 1964, through Dec. 31, 1965). SOLRAD 7A data indicated that the Sun's X-ray output was at a minimum during May, June and July 1964.

== Legacy and status ==
The satellite is still in orbit and its position can be tracked online.

COSPAR satellite ID: 1964-001D
