= SOLRAD 6 =

Solar X-ray

- Mission type: Solar X-ray
- Operator: NRL
- COSPAR ID: 1963-021C
- SATCAT no.: 00599

Start of mission
- Launch date: June 15, 1963
- Rocket: Thor Augmented Delta-Agena D
- Launch site: Vandenberg Air Force Base Space Launch Complex 1, Pad 1

End of mission
- Decay date: July 31, 1963

Orbital parameters
- Reference system: Geocentric
- Regime: Low Earth

SOLRAD 6 (from "solar radiation"; also called SOLRAD 6A or Poppy 2A) was the sixth solar X-ray monitoring satellite in the United States Navy's SOLRAD series, the third in the series to successfully orbit. It was launched along with POPPY 2, an ELINT surveillance package, as well as three other satellites, boosted into orbit via a Thor Augmented Delta-Agena D rocket on June 15, 1963.

== Background ==
The SOLRAD science satellite program was conceived in 1958 to observe the Sun in the X-ray spectrum. It was quickly combined, to provide civilian cover (launches being unclassified at that time), with the concurrently conceived United States Naval Research Laboratory's GRAB satellite project, which would collect information on foreign radars and communications installations. There were five SOLRAD/GRAB missions between 1960 and 1962, with the scientific SOLRAD experiments sharing satellite space with GRAB's intelligence payload. Two of the missions were successful.

In 1962, all U.S. overhead reconnaissance projects were consolidated under the National Reconnaissance Office (NRO), which elected to continue and expand the GRAB mission starting July 1962 with a next-generation set of satellites, code-named POPPY. With the initiation of POPPY, SOLRAD experiments would no longer be carried on electronic spy satellites; rather, they would now get their own satellites, launched alongside POPPY missions to provide some measure of mission cover.

The first POPPY mission was launched on December 13, 1962, along with several other satellites on a mission similar to that of SOLRAD 3, complete with an Injun (satellite) ionospheric research satellite. The mission was successful, despite POPPY 1's elliptical (rather than the planned circular) orbit, and data was returned for 28 months. No SOLRAD was launched concurrent with this first POPPY mission.

== Spacecraft ==
SOLRAD 6 (also called SOLRAD 6A) was larger than its SOLRAD/GRAB predecessors: 24 inches in diameter (from 20) and with a nine-inch equatorial band giving the craft an elongated rather than spherical form. The satellite was equipped with six X-ray detecting ion chambers, two more than its predecessors, covering the ranges of 0.1-1.6Å, .5-3Å, 2-6Å, 2-8Å, 8-16Å, and 44-60Å.

== Mission and results ==
Launched on June 15, 1963 (COSPAR 1963-021C) via a Thor Augmented Delta-Agena D rocket (Thor 378) from Vandenberg AFB with other satellites (Poppy 2B, Poppy 2C/RADOSE, LOFTI 2A, Surcal 3, Wild Bill 4), SOLRAD 6 was placed into an incorrect elliptical orbit, its perigee so low that the atmosphere soon caused the satellite to decay from orbit on July 31, 1963.

Because of its short orbital lifetime, SOLRAD 6 returned relatively little data. Moreover, the Sun was very quiet during the satellite's six weeks of operation, and the four Lyman-Alpha photometers capable of registering X-ray emissions with wavelengths shorter than 8Å reported no results. No scientific data were ever published from SOLRAD 6's measurements, and the strip chart recordings of them were no longer available as of 1991.
