= SOLRAD 9 =

NASA artificial satellite

Solrad 9
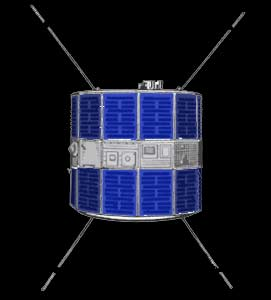
- Solrad 9.
- Mission type: Solar science
- Operator: NASA
- COSPAR ID: 1968-017A
- SATCAT no.: 3141
- Mission duration: 22 years, 8 months and 10 days (final)

Spacecraft properties
- Manufacturer: Naval Research Laboratory
- Launch mass: 198 kilograms (437 lb)

Start of mission
- Launch date: 5 March 1968, 18:28 UTC
- Rocket: Scout B-1 S160C
- Launch site: Wallops LA-3A

End of mission
- Last contact: March 1974
- Decay date: 16 November 1990

Orbital parameters
- Reference system: Geocentric
- Regime: Low Earth
- Eccentricity: 0.01372
- Perigee altitude: 448 kilometers (278 mi)
- Apogee altitude: 638 kilometers (396 mi)
- Inclination: 59.4°
- Period: 95.5 minutes
- Epoch: 5 March 1968

Instruments
- 14 Photometers (UV and X-ray)

Solrad 9, also known Explorer 37 and Explorer SE-B, was one of the SOLRAD (Solar Radiation) program that began in 1960 to provide continuous coverage of solar radiation with a set of standard photometers.

== Launch and operations ==
Was launched on March 5, 1968 from Wallops Flight Facility, Virginia, United States, with Scout launch vehicle.

Solrad 9 was a spin stabilized satellite oriented with its spin axis perpendicular to the sun-satellite line so that the 14 solar X-ray and UV photometers pointing radially outward from its equatorial belt viewed the sun with each revolution. Data were simultaneously transmitted via FM/AM telemetry and recorded in a core memory that read out its contents on command. Individual scientists and institutions were invited to receive and use the data transmitted on the 136 MHz telemetry band on the standard IRIG channels three through eight.

In the time that elapsed between the termination of Solrad 8 operations in August 1967 and the orbiting of Solrad 9, solar activity data were obtained using photometers in satellites OSO-4 and OGO-4.

Solrad 9 was particularly important among the Solrad series satellites because thanks to the collected data were useful to predict the behavior of the sun during the period of the first crewed missions of the Apollo Program, starting from the first, Apollo 7, it is therefore useful to draw up a mission program to ensure, from this point of view, the safety of astronauts. It recorded important data on one of the strongest solar storms that occurred between Apollo 9 and Apollo 10 and which would have produced potentially hazardous (to even fatal) effects to astronauts had then been in space (if the spacecraft were outside the Earth's protective magnetosphere) at the time.

As of July 1971, it was decided to use the Solrad 10 memory data, put into orbit on the 8th of the same month, and so continued until June 1973, when the Solrad 10 data storage device had a bad operation and NASA began to read data from the memory of Solrad 9. The satellite remained active until February 25, 1974, when the gas reserves useful to maintain control of the facility were over. Once the stability was lost, in fact, the satellite became useless and therefore was turned off.

Unlike Solrad 8, its predecessor, Solrad 9 did not remain in orbit and returned to the atmosphere, disintegrating on November 16, 1990.
