= SOLRAD 1 =

U.S. solar X-ray and surveillance satellite

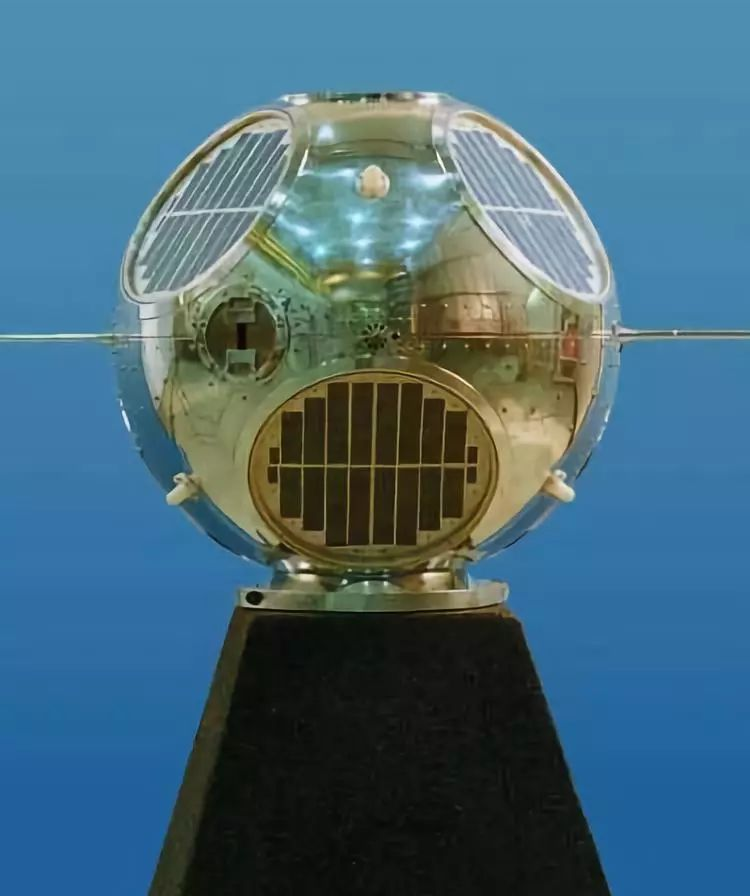
- SOLRAD/GRAB 1 model at the National Cryptologic Museum
- Names: GRAB 1 SOLar RADiation; SR 1 GREB 1
- Mission type: Solar X-rays
- Operator: Naval Research Laboratory (NRL)
- Harvard designation: 1960 Eta 2
- COSPAR ID: 1960-007B
- SATCAT no.: 00046
- Mission duration: 10 months (achieved); 65 years, 11 months and 5 days (in orbit)

Spacecraft properties
- Spacecraft type: SOLRAD
- Manufacturer: Naval Research Laboratory
- Launch mass: 19.05 kg (42.0 lb)
- Dimensions: 51 cm (20 in) of diameter
- Power: 6 watts

Start of mission
- Launch date: 22 June 1960, 05:54 GMT
- Rocket: Thor-Ablestar
- Launch site: Cape Canaveral, LC-17B
- Contractor: Douglas Aircraft Company

End of mission
- Deactivated: April 1961

Orbital parameters
- Reference system: Geocentric orbit
- Regime: Low Earth orbit
- Perigee altitude: 614 km (382 mi)
- Apogee altitude: 1,061 km (659 mi)
- Inclination: 66.69°
- Period: 101.7 minutes

SOLRAD 1 (from "solar radiation") is the public designation for SOLRAD/GRAB 1, a combination science and surveillance satellite launched into orbit on 22 June 1960. It was the first satellite to successfully observe solar X-rays, the first to conduct surveillance from orbit, and the first to be launched with another instrumented satellite (the unrelated navigation satellite, Transit 2A).

Developed by the United States Navy's Naval Research Laboratory (NRL), the satellite was in many ways a direct successor to NRL's Project Vanguard, the first American satellite program. The satellite's scientific mission was a success, sending useful data until November 1960 that determined normal solar X-ray output and confirmed the connection between increased solar X-ray activity and radio fade-outs.

The SOLRAD scientific package aboard the satellite provided cover for the Galactic Radiation and Background (GRAB) electronic surveillance package, whose mission was to map the Soviet Union's air defense radar network. The GRAB mission was also successful, operating until 22 September 1960, and revealing that the Soviet air defense radar network was more extensive than had been expected. SOLRAD/GRAB 1 was switched off in April 1961, making it the first satellite to be remotely deactivated.

== Background ==
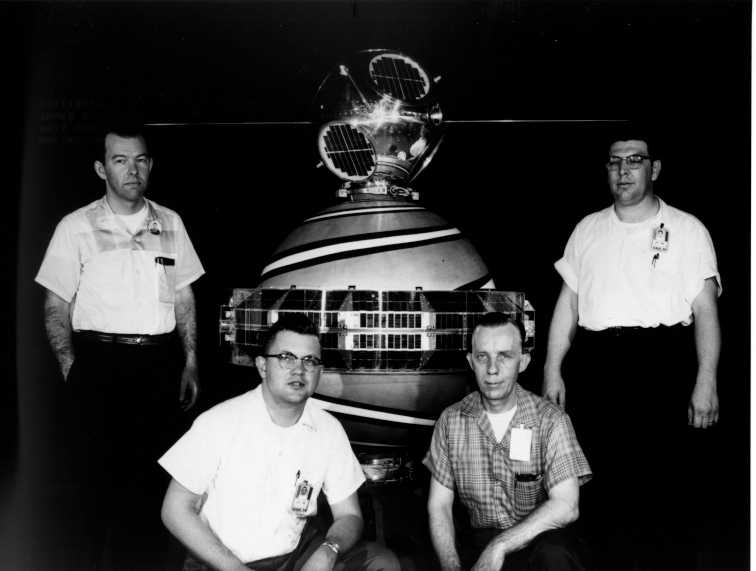
SOLRAD 1 on top of Transit 2A with four of its creators. From left: Martin J. Votaw, George G. Kronmiller, Alfred R. Conover, and Roy A. Harding.

In 1957, the Soviet Union began deploying the S-75 Dvina surface-to-air missile, controlled by Fan Song fire control radars. This development made penetration of Soviet air space by American bombers more dangerous. The United States Air Force began a program of cataloging the rough location and individual operating frequencies of these radars, using electronic reconnaissance aircraft flying off the borders of the Soviet Union. This program provided information on radars on the periphery of the Soviet Union, but information on the sites in the interior of the country was lacking. Some experiments were carried out using radio telescopes looking for serendipitous Soviet radar reflections off the Moon, but this proved an inadequate solution to the problem.

In March 1958, while the United States Naval Research Laboratory (NRL) was heavily involved in Project Vanguard, the United States Navy's effort to launch a satellite, NRL engineer Reid D. Mayo determined that a Vanguard derivative could be used to map Soviet missile sites. Mayo had previously developed a system for submarines whereby they could evade anti-submarine aircraft by picking up their radar signals. Physically small and mechanically robust, it could be adapted to fit inside the small Vanguard frame.

Mayo presented the idea to Howard Lorenzen, head of the NRL's countermeasures branch. Lorenzen promoted the idea within the Department of Defense, and six months later the concept was approved under the name "Tattletale". President Eisenhower approved full development of the program on 24 August 1959.

After a news leak by The New York Times, Eisenhower cancelled the project. The project was restarted under the name "Walnut" (the satellite component given the name "DYNO") after heightened security had been implemented, including greater oversight and restriction of access to "need-to-know" personnel. American space launches were not classified at the time, and a co-flying cover mission that would share space with DYNO was desired to conceal DYNO's electronic surveillance mission from its intended targets.

The study of the Sun's electromagnetic spectrum provided an ideal cover opportunity. The Navy had wanted to determine the role of solar flares in radio communications disruptions and the level of hazard to satellites and astronauts posed by ultraviolet and X-ray radiation. Such a study had not previously been possible, as the Earth's atmosphere blocks the Sun's X-ray and ultraviolet output from ground observation. Moreover, solar output is unpredictable and fluctuates rapidly, making sub-orbital sounding rockets inadequate for the observation task. A satellite was required for long-term, continuous study of the complete solar spectrum.

Wavelengths of light blocked by Earth's atmosphere.

The NRL already had a purpose-built solar observatory in the form of Vanguard 3, which had been launched in 1959. Vanguard 3 had carried X-ray and ultraviolet detectors, though they had been completely saturated by the background radiation of the lower Van Allen radiation belt. Development of the DYNO satellite from the Vanguard design was managed by NRL engineer Martin Votaw, leading a team of Project Vanguard engineers and scientists who had not migrated to NASA. The dual-purpose satellite was renamed GRAB ("Galactic Radiation And Background"), sometimes called GREB ("Galactic Radiation Experiment Background"), and referred to in its scientific capacity as SOLRAD ("SOLar RADiation").

A dummy mass simulator SOLRAD was successfully launched on 13 April 1960, attached to Transit 1B, proving the dual satellite launch technique. On 5 May 1960, just four days after the downing of Gary Powers' U-2 flight over the Soviet Union highlighted the vulnerability of aircraft-based surveillance, President Eisenhower approved the launch of an operational SOLRAD satellite.

== Spacecraft ==
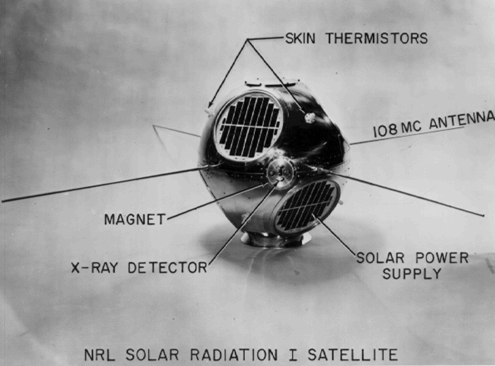
SOLRAD 1 schematic

Like Vanguard 3, SOLRAD/GRAB 1 was roughly spherical, 51 cm (20 in) in diameter, and powered by six circular patches of solar cells. SOLRAD/GRAB 1 was slightly lighter, massing 19.05 kg (42.0 lb) (as opposed to Vanguard's 23.7 kg (52 lb)). The solar cells powered nine D cell batteries in series (12 volts total) providing 6 watts of power.

The satellite's SOLRAD scientific package included two Lyman-alpha photometers (nitric oxide ion chambers) for the study of ultraviolet light in the 1050–1350 Å wavelength range and one X-ray photometer (an argon ion chamber) in the 2–8 Å wavelength range, all mounted around the equator of the satellite. To avoid being saturated by Van Allen Belt electrons, the instruments included a magnetic shield.

The satellite's GRAB surveillance equipment was designed to detect Soviet air defense radars broadcasting on the S-band (1550–3900 MHz). over a circular area 6,500 km (4,000 mi) in diameter beneath it. A receiver in the satellite was tuned to the approximate frequency of the radars, and its output was used to trigger a separate Very high frequency (VHF) transmitter in the spacecraft. As it traveled over the Soviet Union, the satellite would detect the pulses from the missile radars and immediately re-broadcast them to American ground stations within range, which would record the signals and send them to the NRL for analysis. Although GRAB's receiver was omnidirectional, by looking for the same signals on multiple passes and comparing that to the known location of the satellite, the rough location of the radars could be determined, along with their exact pulse repetition frequency.

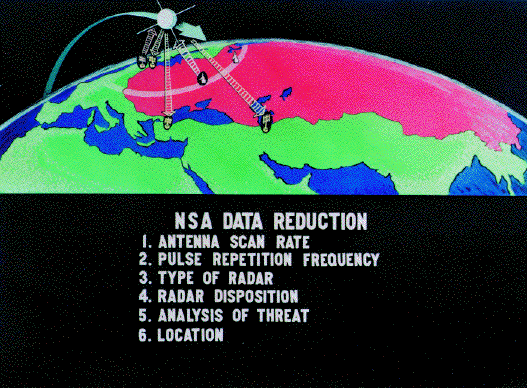
"NSA Data Reduction", indicating the intelligence to be derived by processing the satellite downlink.

Telemetry was sent via four whip-style 63.5 cm (25.0 in) long antennas mounted on SOLRAD's equator. Scientific telemetry was sent on 108 MHz, the International Geophysical Year standard frequency used by Vanguard. Commands from the ground and electronic surveillance were collected via smaller antennas on 139 MHz. Data received on the ground was recorded on magnetic tape and couriered back to the NRL, where it was evaluated, duplicated, and forwarded to the National Security Agency (NSA) at Fort Meade, Maryland, and the Strategic Air Command at Offut Air Force Base Omaha, Nebraska, for further analysis and processing.

Like most early automatic spacecraft, SOLRAD/GRAB 1, though spin stabilized, lacked attitude control systems and thus scanned the whole sky without focusing on a particular source. So that scientists could properly interpret the source of the X-rays detected by SOLRAD/GRAB 1, the spacecraft carried a vacuum photocell to determine when the Sun was striking its photometers and the angle at which sunlight hit them.

== Launch and orbiting ==
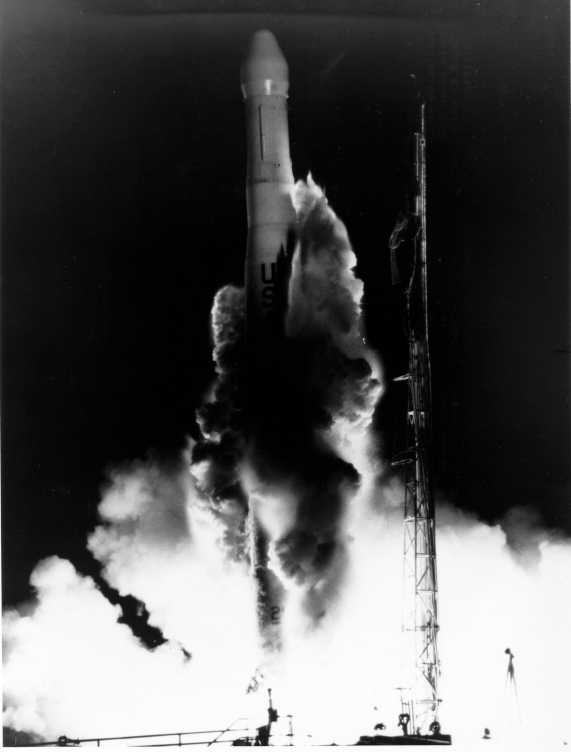
Lift-off of the Thor-Ablestar rocket with Transit 2A and SOLRAD 1 satellites.

SOLRAD/GRAB 1 was launched at 05:54 GMT on 22 June 1960, via Thor-Ablestar launch system from Cape Canaveral LC-17B. The launch marked the first time two instrumented satellites had been carried to orbit on the same booster. SOLRAD/GRAB 1 initially circled the Earth once every 101.7 minutes, varying from 614 km (382 mi) to 1,046 km (650 mi) in altitude; this was a deviation from the planned 930 km (580 mi) circular orbit, caused by glitches in the second stage of the booster, but it did not affect the satellite's objectives.

== Scientific results ==
SOLRAD/GRAB 1, the world's first orbital solar observatory, transmitted more than 500 batches of scientific data between June and November 1960, after which it became impossible to determine the angle at which the Sun hit the SOLRAD experiments. Nevertheless, SOLRAD/GRAB 1 continued to send data until April 1961, when the spacecraft was switched off from the ground. This marked the first time a satellite had been remotely deactivated.

The satellite communicated results in real-time, which meant that data could only be received when there was a tracking station within range – either one of Vanguard's Minitrack stations or a few other isolated receivers. Thus, just one to ten minutes per orbit, some 1.2% of the satellite's active time, returned solar observations. The magnetic deflectors proved effective, allowing SOLRAD/GRAB 1 to become the first satellite to successfully observe solar X-rays. However, they also interacted with the Earth's magnetic field, causing the satellite to precess (wobble around its axis like a spinning top) so that its sensors were in shadow half of the time the satellite was in sunlight.

=== X-rays ===
Approximately 20% of SOLRAD's data transmissions contained X-ray measurements, sufficient to establish the Sun's normal X-ray radiation levels (in the 2–8 Å range of detection) during times of inactivity: less than 6 × 10^{−11} Joules/cm^{2}/sec. When X-ray output was observed strongly in excess of this baseline, it was usually correlated with solar activity visible from the ground. The data also showed that the X-ray output could change significantly in as little as one minute, underscoring the need for constant observation.

When detectable X-ray output exceeded three times the normal rate, radio fade-outs occurred, confirming the link between solar X-ray variability and the strength of the Earth's ionized thermospheric layers. These fade-outs were found to not just be caused by solar flares, but also by active solar prominence regions, bright surges, and subflares at the edge (or limb) of the Sun.

=== Ultraviolet ===
SOLRAD/GRAB 1 did not find a correlation between solar ultraviolet output and thermospheric disturbance, and the Lyman-alpha detectors were excluded from the later SOLRAD 3/GRAB 2 mission.

=== Nuclear test monitoring ===
It had been hoped during design and development that SOLRAD/GRAB 1 would be able to identify above-ground atomic tests, which produced strong emissions of X-rays in the bands that the satellite could detect. If a nuclear test ban treaty between the United States and the Soviet Union were to go into effect, SOLRAD/GRAB 1 or its successors might then be able to detect unauthorized tests by the Soviets. However, no spikes corresponding to known Soviet atomic tests were conclusively found in SOLRAD/GRAB 1's data. The Vela-Hotel satellites were later purpose-built for the task after the ratification of the Partial Nuclear Test Ban Treaty in 1963.

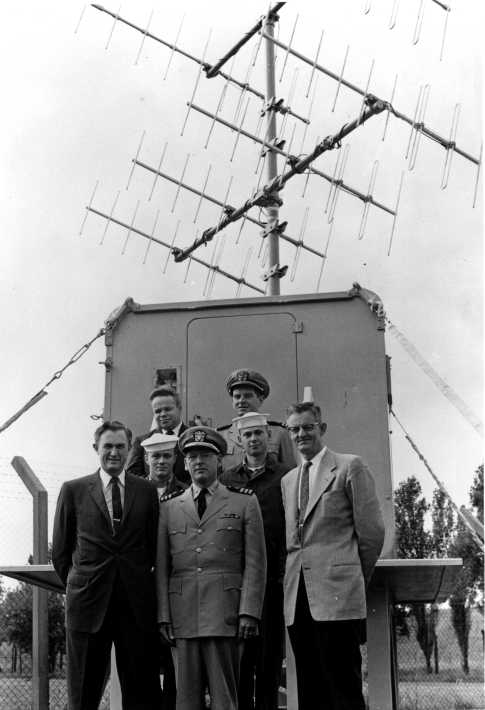
GRAB radio control hut and team overseas

== GRAB results ==
SOLRAD/GRAB 1 was the world's first operational surveillance satellite. For fear that the Soviets would discover the satellite's espionage mission, and mindful of the problems caused by the U-2 incident, President Eisenhower insisted that every GRAB transmission be personally approved by him, and that transmissions not be made on successive passes. Thus, though the satellite's surveillance equipment functioned for the 92 days from launch until their failure on 22 September 1960, GRAB 1 only returned 22 batches of data, its first delivered on 5 July 1960 to the station at Wahiawa, Hawaii, well out of the range of Soviet detection. Even this first limited surveillance endeavor saturated the ground teams' ability to analyze and process the data and yielded valuable information, including the revelation that Soviet air defense activity was more extensive than expected.

== Legacy and status ==
The SOLRAD/GRAB series flew four more times finishing with the SOLRAD 4B mission launched on 26 April 1962. Of the five SOLRAD/GRAB missions, only SOLRAD/GRAB 1 and SOLRAD 3/GRAB 2 were successes, the others failing to reach orbit. In 1962, all U.S. overhead reconnaissance projects were consolidated under the National Reconnaissance Office (NRO), which elected to continue and expand the GRAB mission starting July 1962 with a next-generation set of satellites, code-named POPPY. With the initiation of POPPY, SOLRAD experiments would no longer be carried on electronic spy satellites; rather, they would now get their own satellites, launched alongside POPPY missions to provide some measure of mission cover. Starting with SOLRAD 8, launched in November 1965, the final five SOLRAD satellites were scientific satellites launched singly, three of which were also given NASA Explorer program numbers. The last in this final series of SOLRAD satellites flew in 1976. In all, there were thirteen operational satellites in the SOLRAD series. The GRAB program was declassified in 1998.

As of 2026, SOLRAD/GRAB 1 (COSPAR ID 1960-007B) is still in orbit. The backup for the SOLRAD/GRAB 1 mission is on display at the Smithsonian National Air and Space Museum.
