= SOLRAD 10 =

NASA satellite of the Explorer program

Solrad 10
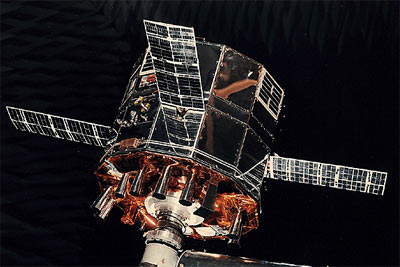
- Solrad 10.
- Mission type: Heliophysics
- Operator: NASA
- COSPAR ID: 1971-058A
- SATCAT no.: 5317

Spacecraft properties
- Manufacturer: Naval Research Laboratory
- Launch mass: 260 kilograms (570 lb)

Start of mission
- Launch date: July 8, 1971, 22:58 UTC
- Rocket: Scout B S177C
- Launch site: Wallops LA-3A

End of mission
- Decay date: 15 December 1979

Orbital parameters
- Reference system: Geocentric
- Regime: Low Earth
- Eccentricity: 0.0006626
- Perigee altitude: 204 kilometers (127 mi)
- Apogee altitude: 213 kilometers (132 mi)
- Inclination: 51.0598°
- RAAN: 328.0487°
- Argument of perigee: 235.3867°
- Mean anomaly: 124.4027°
- Mean motion: 16.23884333
- Epoch: 13 December 1979
- Revolution no.: 46942

Solrad 10, also known Explorer 44, NRL-PL 165 and Explorer SE-C, was one of the SOLRAD series designed to provide continuous coverage of wavelength and intensity changes in solar radiation in the UV, soft and hard X-ray regions. The satellite also mapped the celestial sphere using a high-sensitivity X-ray detector. Information collected was expected to contribute to a better understanding of the physical processes involved in solar flares and other solar activity, and the potential effects of this activity on short-wave communications, as well as on future human space travel. For the period of July 1971 to June 1973, the core memory data of Explorer 44 (SOLRAD 10) were used rather than those from Explorer 37 (SOLRAD 9). The Explorer 44 (SOLRAD 10) core memory failed on 11 June 1973, and Explorer 37 (SOLRAD 9) was heavily used until 25 February 1974, when the gas supply of the attitude control system was exhausted.

== Launch ==
Solrad 10 was launched on 8 July 1971 from Wallops Flight Facility, Virginia, with a Scout rocket. When it was launched, it had an orbit with 630 kilometres (390 mi) of apogee, 436 kilometres (271 mi) of perigee, 51.1 degrees of orbital inclination and 1 hour and 35 minutes of orbital period.

It launched from Wallops Island, Virginia, into a 436 × 630 km (271 × 391 mi) orbit. The plane of rotation shifted about 1°/day so that a stellar detector mounted to point radially outward from the axis scanned the celestial sphere. Data from all detectors were stored in a 54-kbs core memory and telemetered on command to the United States Naval Research Laboratory (NRL) tracking station at Blossom Point, Maryland. Data were also transmitted in real time at 137.71-MHz and were shared with the international scientific community through Committee on Space Research (COSPAR). Expected lifetime was 3 years.

== Spacecraft ==
Solrad 10 was a 12-sided cylinder that measured 76 centimetres (30 in) in diameter and 58 centimetres (23 in) in height. Four symmetrically placed 17.8 by 53.3 centimetres (7.0 in × 21.0 in) solar cell panels, hinged at the central section of the structure, served as the elements of a turnstile antenna system. 18 solar sensors were mounted pointing parallel to the spin axis of the satellite, which pointed directly at the solar disk. The plane of rotation shifted about 1°/day so that a stellar detector mounted to point radially outward from the axis scanned the celestial sphere. Data from all detectors were stored in a 54 kb core memory and telemetered on command to the NRL Satellite Operations Center at Blossom Point, Maryland. Data were also transmitted in real time at 137.710 MHz.

== Experiment ==
=== All-Sky X-Ray Survey ===
This experiment was designed to map the sources of X-ray emission in the sky in the 0.5 - 15-A region. The detector, mounted on the side of the spacecraft, was a large-area proportional counter mounted to point radially outward from the spin axis, which pointed continually toward the sun. The detector window was made of 1/8-mil-thick mylar with an effective area of 100-cm^{2}. The gas filler was a mixture of 0.45 argon, 0.45 xenon, and 0.10 carbon dioxide maintained at 4 lb/cm^{2}. A collimator limited the field of view to 8°, full width at half maximum (FWHM) in a plane containing the spin axis and 1° in the plane perpendicular to the spin axis. Charged particle information was provided by proportional counters mounted on three sides of the X-ray detector. Aspect information was provided by a blue-sensitive photomultiplier capable of detecting all fourth-magnitude and not fifth-magnitude stars. The resolution of the aspect system and the accuracy with which the experiment could locate X-ray sources was better than ± 0.25°. The detector was connected to a 400-channel pulse time analyzer which was synchronized with the spin period to give a 2° spatial resolution in the spin direction. The whole celestial sphere was surveyed every 6 months. Due to the low altitude of the satellite, there was a high charged-particle count at all times. This background limited the usefulness of the data, and no results from this experiment were published.

=== Solar Radiation Detectors ===
This experiment was designed to monitor the solar X-ray flux in eight bands and the solar UV flux in five bands as part of a long-term project to observe solar X-ray and UV activity with sets of standardized sensors over an entire solar cycle. The X-ray bands observed were 0.08 to 0.8 A, 0.1 to 1.6 A, 0.5 to 3 A, 1 to 5 A, 1 to 8 A, 8 to 16 A, 1 to 20 A, and 44 to 60 A. All the detectors for these bands, with the exception of that for the 0.08- to 0.8-A band, were ionization chambers fitted with a variety of window material (beryllium, aluminum, and Mylar) of various thicknesses and filled with several different gases (krypton, argon, nitrogen, Carbon tetrachloride, and xenon) at various pressures. The 0.08- to 0.8-A band had as a detector a cesium iodide (CSI) (Na) scintillating crystal surrounded by a plastic scintillating material viewed by a single photomultiplier. This detector was designed to collect data on the very high-energy solar X-ray emission observed only during solar flares. The UV bands observed were 170 to 500 A, 170 to 700 A, 1080 to 1350 A, 1225 to 1350 A, and 1450 to 1600 A. The two shorter wavelength bands had lithium fluoride, photosensitive surfaces protected by aluminum, aluminum oxide, and carbon windows for detectors, while the remaining bands had ion chambers with windows composed of lithium fluoride, calcium fluoride, or silicon dioxide, and various gas filters (nitric oxide or triethylamine 8). Some of the solar detectors were protected from charged particles by cone-shaped aluminum collimators. The data were transmitted over two telemetry systems in one of three forms—stored data, real-time digital (PCM) data, and real-time analog data. Telemetry system 1 (TM 1) used a PAM/PCM/FM/PM transmitter that operated at 137.710 MHz with a radiated power of 250 MW. Under normal operating conditions, TM 1 continuously transmitted analog and PCM real-time data, although the real-time digital PCM was the primary real-time transmission format. Telemetry system 2 (TM 2) used a PCM/PM transmitter that operated at 136.38-MHz with a radiated power of 250 MW. TM 2 transmitted stored data (up to one data sample a minute for 14.25 hours) on command.

== Atmospheric entry ==
Explorer 44 (SOLRAD 10) returned to the atmosphere, disintegrating on 15 December 1980, or December 15, 1979.

== See also ==
- Solrad 9
