= Galactic Radiation and Background =

First US orbital surveillance program

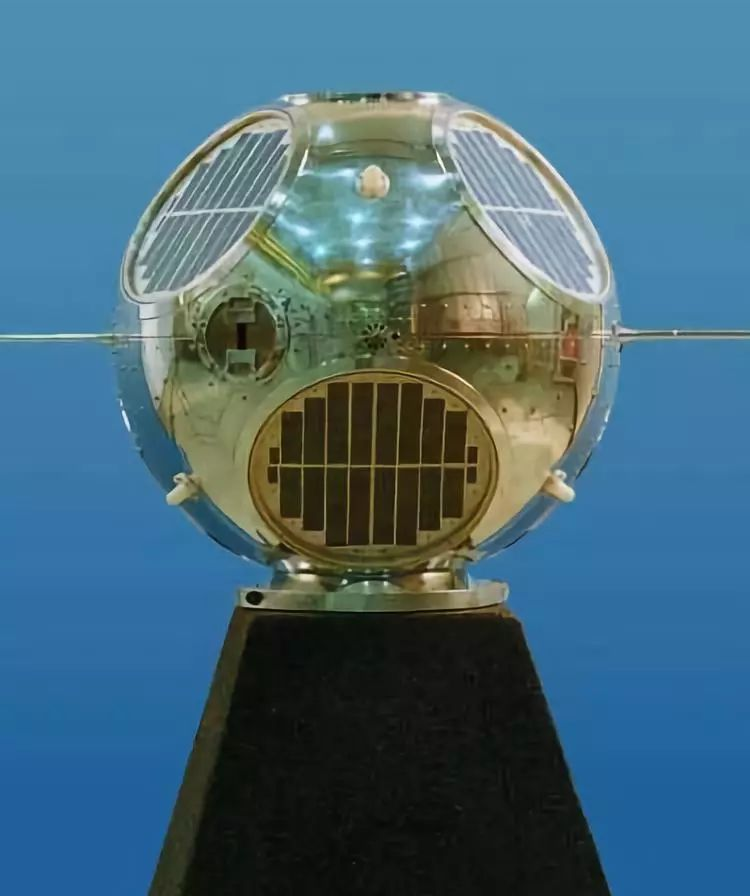
This is a display model of a GRAB satellite at the National Cryptologic Museum.

Galactic Radiation and Background (GRAB) was the first successful United States orbital surveillance program, comprising a series of five Naval Research Laboratory electronic surveillance and solar astronomy satellites, launched from 1960 to 1962. Though only two of the five satellites made it into orbit, they returned a wealth of information on Soviet air defense radar capabilities as well as useful astronomical observations of the Sun.

== Development ==
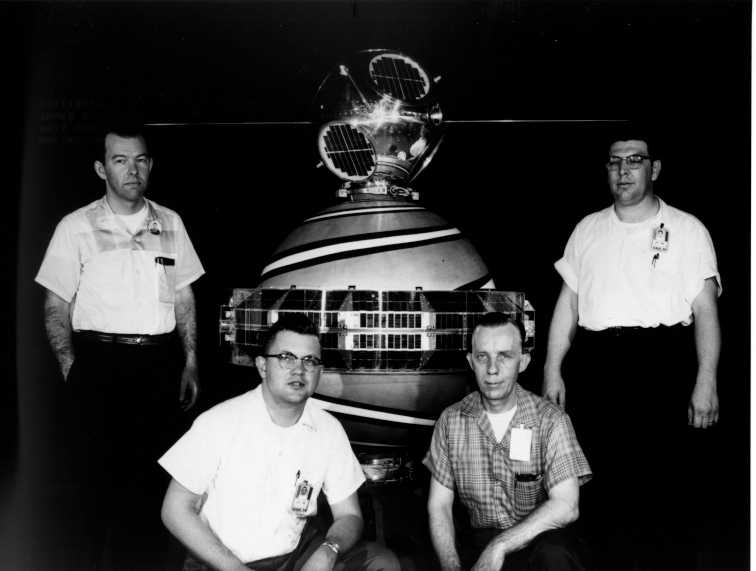
SOLRAD 1 on top of Transit 2A with four of its creators. From left: Martin J. Votaw, George G. Kronmiller, Alfred R. Conover, and Roy A. Harding.

In 1957, the Soviet Union began deploying the S-75 Dvina surface-to-air missile, controlled by Fan Song fire control radars. This development made penetration of Soviet air space by American bombers more dangerous. The United States Air Force began a program of cataloging the rough location and individual operating frequencies of these radars, using electronic reconnaissance aircraft flying off the borders of the Soviet Union. This program provided information on radars on the periphery of the Soviet Union, but information on the sites in the interior of the country was lacking. Some experiments were carried out using radio telescopes looking for serendipitous Soviet radar reflections off the Moon, but this proved an inadequate solution to the problem.

In March 1958, while the United States Naval Research Laboratory (NRL) was heavily involved in Project Vanguard, the United States Navy's effort to launch a satellite, NRL engineer Reid D. Mayo determined that a Vanguard derivative could be used to map Soviet missile sites. Mayo had previously developed an antenna system for submarines whereby they could evade anti-submarine aircraft by picking up their radar signals. Physically small and mechanically robust, it could be adapted to fit inside the small Vanguard frame. Mayo presented the idea to Howard Lorenzen, head of the NRL's countermeasures branch. Lorenzen promoted the idea within the Department of Defense (U.S. DoD), and six months later the concept was approved under the name "Tattletale". President Eisenhower approved full development of the program on 24 August 1959.

When news of the project leaked in The New York Times, Eisenhower canceled the project. The project was restarted under the name "Walnut" (the satellite component given the name "DYNO") after heightened security had been implemented, including greater oversight and restriction of access to "need-to-know" personnel. American space launches were not classified at the time, and a cover mission that would share the satellite bus with DYNO was desired to conceal DYNO's electronic surveillance mission from its intended targets.

The study of the Sun's electromagnetic spectrum provided an ideal cover opportunity. The Navy had wanted to determine the role of solar flares in radio communications disruptions and the level of hazard to satellites and astronauts posed by ultraviolet and X-ray radiation. Such a study had not previously been possible, as the Earth's atmosphere blocks much of the Sun's X-ray and ultraviolet output from ground observation. Moreover, solar output is unpredictable and fluctuates rapidly, making sub-orbital sounding rockets inadequate for the observation task. A satellite was required for long-term, continuous study of the complete solar spectrum.

The NRL already had a purpose-built solar observatory in the form of Vanguard 3, which had been launched in 1959. Vanguard 3 had carried X-ray and ultraviolet detectors, though they had been completely saturated by the background radiation of the Van Allen radiation belt. Development of the DYNO satellite from the Vanguard design was managed by NRL engineer Martin Votaw, leading a team of Project Vanguard engineers and scientists who had not migrated to NASA. The dual-purpose satellite was renamed GRAB ("Galactic Radiation And Background"), sometimes called GREB ("Galactic Radiation Experiment Background"), and referred to in its scientific capacity as SOLRAD ("SOLar RADiation").

== Operational history ==
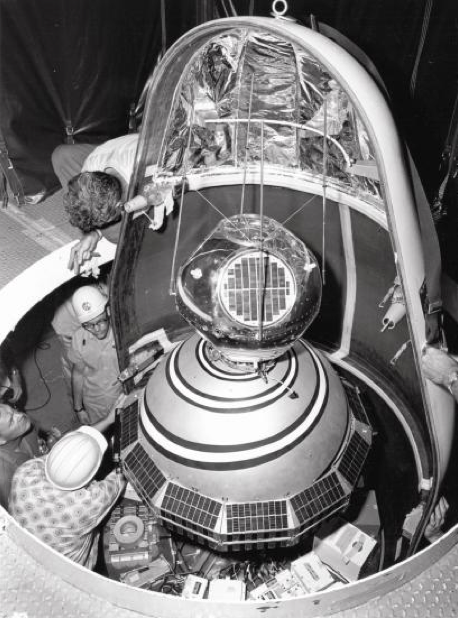
GRAB 1 sitting atop Transit 2A during launch preparations.

The first GRAB satellite, SOLRAD 1, was launched 22 June 1960, on the same rocket as Transit 2A, an early naval navigation satellite. GRAB 1 had the distinction of being the first successful U.S. intelligence satellite, returning electronic intelligence (ELINT) data from 5 July 1960, until 22 September 1960, totaling 22 data collection passes of 40 minutes each over the Soviet Union, China and their allies. The SOLRAD experiment remained operational for ten months (though usable data was obtained only for five months) and it returned the first real-time X-ray and ultraviolet observations of the Sun.

During the second launch attempt, the Thor booster shut down 12 seconds early, and the flight was subsequently terminated by range safety, raining fragments over Cuba. To ensure this did not happen again, subsequent launches from Cape Canaveral flew a dogleg trajectory to reach 70° inclination, avoiding the island nation.

The other successful GRAB mission, GRAB 2, was launched 29 June 1961, atop the same Thor-Ablestar launch vehicle as Injun, a geophysical science satellite from the University of Iowa, and Transit 4A. GRAB 2 began transmission of intelligence to the ground on 15 July 1962, and functioned in orbit for fourteen months. The amount of data received was so large that automated analytic tools had to be developed, tools that found application in subsequent surveillance programs. GRAB 2's SOLRAD experiment (SOLRAD 3) also contributed substantially to solar X-ray astronomy.

Three more GRAB satellites were produced, the first two failing to make orbit in 1962. The final scheduled GRAB flight was canceled, and the satellite intended for the mission was ultimately donated to the National Air and Space Museum in 2002.

== Legacy ==
The GRAB program formally ended with GRAB 2's last transmission in August 1962. After the establishment of the National Reconnaissance Office (NRO) in 1962, the GRAB program was succeeded by the POPPY program, which lasted from its funding authorization in July 1962 until its termination on 30 September 1977. The existence of the ELINT nature of GRAB was declassified by the NRL in 1998.

== Table of launches ==
Name	Mission	Launched	Site	Launch vehicle	International Designators	Remarks
GRAB 1	SOLRAD 1	22 June 1960	Cape Canaveral	Thor DM-21 Ablestar	1960-007B	Launched with Transit2A. Still in orbit as of March 2026
GRAB 2	SOLRAD 2	30 November 1960	Cape Canaveral	Thor DM-21 Ablestar	SRD-2	Launch failure
GRAB 3	SOLRAD 3	29 June 1961	Cape Canaveral	Thor DM-21 Ablestar	1961-015B	Launched with Injun 1. Still in orbit as of March 2026; expected to orbit for about 900 years
GREB 4	SOLRAD 4	24 January 1962	Cape Canaveral	Thor DM-21 Ablestar	SR4GREB	Launched with Injun 2. Launch failure
GREB 5	SOLRAD 7A	11 January 1964	Vandenberg AFB	Thor Augmented Delta-Agena D	1964-001D	Launched with SOLRAD 7A, Secor 1, and gSSE 1.
GREB 6	SOLRAD 7B	9 March 1965	Vandenberg AFB	Thor Augmented Delta-Agena D	1965-016D	
