= SOLRAD 3 =

U.S. solar X-ray and surveillance satellite

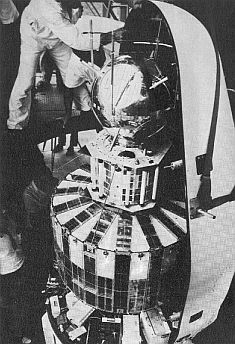
- Transit 4A, Injun 1 and SOLRAD 3 satellites
- Names: GRAB 2 SOLar RADiation 3 SR 3 GREB 2
- Mission type: Solar X-rays
- Operator: United States Naval Research Laboratory (USNRL)
- Harvard designation: 1961 Omicron 2
- COSPAR ID: 1961-015B
- SATCAT no.: 00117
- Mission duration: 64 years, 11 months and 27 days (in orbit)

Spacecraft properties
- Spacecraft type: SOLRAD
- Manufacturer: Naval Research Laboratory (NRL)
- Launch mass: 25 kg (55 lb)
- Dimensions: 51 cm (20 in)

Start of mission
- Launch date: 29 June 1961, 04:22 GMT
- Rocket: Thor-Ablestar
- Launch site: Cape Canaveral, LC-17B
- Contractor: Douglas Aircraft Company

Orbital parameters
- Reference system: Geocentric orbit
- Regime: Low Earth orbit
- Perigee altitude: 882 km
- Apogee altitude: 999 km
- Inclination: 66.82°
- Period: 103.90 minutes

SOLRAD 3 (from "solar radiation") was a solar X-ray satellite, the third in the SOLRAD program. Developed by the United States Navy's Naval Research Laboratory (USNRL), it shared satellite space with and provided cover for the Navy's GRAB 2 (Galactic Radiation And Background), a secret electronic surveillance program.

The satellite was launched atop a Thor-Ablestar rocket on 29 June 1961 along with Transit 4A and the University of Iowa's Van Allen Belts Injun 1 satellite. After reaching orbit, SOLRAD 3/GRAB 2 and INJUN 1 separated from Transit 4A but not from each other. Though this reduced SOLRAD 3's data-transmission ability by half, the satellite still returned valuable information regarding the Sun's normal levels of X-ray emissions. The SOLRAD experiment package also established that, during solar flares, the higher the energy of emitted X-rays, the more disruption caused on the Earth's thermosphere (and radio transmissions therein). The GRAB mission was also highly successful, returning so much data on Soviet air defense radar facilities that an automated analysis system had to be developed to process it all.

== Background ==
The United States Navy's Naval Research Laboratory (NRL) established itself as a player early in the Space Race with the development and management of Project Vanguard (1956–1959), America's first satellite program. After Vanguard, the Navy's next major goal was to use the observational high ground of Earth's orbit to survey Soviet radar locations and frequencies. This first space surveillance project was called "GRAB", later expanded into the more innocuous backronym, Galactic Radiation and Background. As American space launches were not classified until late 1961, a co-flying cover mission sharing satellite space was desired to conceal GRAB's electronic surveillance mission from its intended targets.

The field of solar astronomy provided such cover. Since the invention of the rocket, astronomers had wanted to fly instruments above the atmosphere to get a better look at the Sun. The Earth's atmosphere blocks large sections of sunlight's electromagnetic spectrum, making it impossible to study the Sun's X-ray and ultraviolet output from the ground. Without this critical information, it was difficult to model the Sun's internal processes, which in turn inhibited stellar astronomy in general. On a more practical level, it was believed that solar flares directly affected the Earth's thermosphere, disrupting radio communications. The U.S. Navy wanted to know when its communications were going to become unreliable or compromised. Sounding rockets had shown that solar output was unpredictable and fluctuated rapidly. A long-term, real-time observation platform above the Earth's atmosphere – in other words, a satellite – was required to properly chart the Sun's radiation, determine its effects on the Earth, and correlate it with ground-based observations of the Sun in other wavelengths of light.

Thus, the SOLRAD project was conceived to address several NRL goals at once:

- to make the first long-term continuous observations of the Sun in ultraviolet and X-ray light, and to correlate these measurements with ground-based observations.
- to evaluate the level of hazard posed by ultraviolet and X-ray radiation.
- to better understand the effect of solar activity (including solar flares) on radio communications.
- to cheaply and efficiently produce a satellite for the GRAB surveillance mission by using a proven design.
- to obscure the GRAB mission under a scientific cover.

A dummy SOLRAD was successfully launched on 13 April 1960, and SOLRAD 1 went into orbit on 22 June 1960, becoming both the world's first surveillance satellite (as GRAB 1) and the first satellite to observe the Sun in X-ray and ultraviolet light. SOLRAD 2, a duplicate of SOLRAD 1, was launched on 30 November 1960, but was lost when its booster flew off course and had to be destroyed.

== Spacecraft ==
Like its two predecessors, SOLRAD 1 and SOLRAD 2, SOLRAD 3/GRAB 2 was a 51 cm diameter sphere based on the Vanguard 3 satellite. Unlike SOLRAD 1 and the abortive SOLRAD 2, the satellite's scientific package did not include Lyman-alpha photometers. This is because it had been discovered since SOLRAD 2's failed launch that the ultraviolet radiation level remained constant during solar flares. Instead, SOLRAD 3 carried two X-ray photometers designed to cover a greater range of wavelengths than the first SOLRAD. In addition to a photometer that, covered the same 2-8 Å range as the earlier SOLRAD, SOLRAD 3 also carried one that measured the bandwidth from 8-14 Å.

As was the case with most early automatic spacecraft, SOLRAD 2, though spin stabilized, lacked attitude control systems and thus scanned the whole sky with no source in particular. So that scientists could properly interpret the source of the X-rays detected by SOLRAD 2, the spacecraft carried a vacuum photocell to determine when the sunlight was striking its photometers and the angle at which it hit them.

SOLRAD 3/GRAB 2 was significantly heavier than its predecessors (25 kg versus 19 kg for SOLRAD 1, 18 kg for SOLRAD 2) as its GRAB package included equipment for monitoring two radar frequencies rather than just one, as in prior flights. In addition to monitoring Soviet air defense radars in the S-band (1,550-3,900 MHz), GRAB 2 could also detect long-range air surveillance radars operating in the Ultra high frequency (UHF) band at around 500 MHz.

== Mission and science results ==
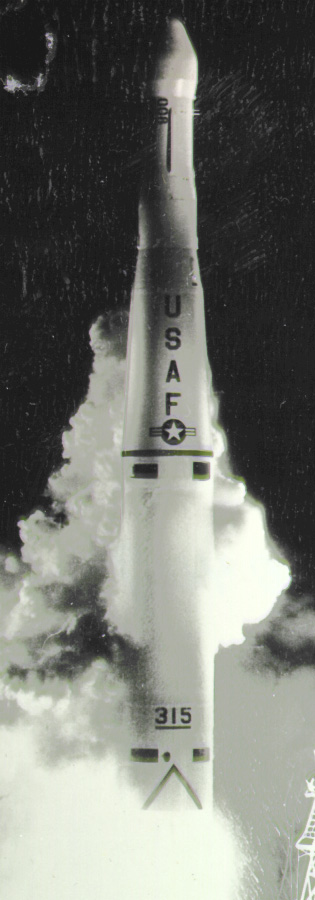
SOLRAD 3's Thor-Ablestar takes off

SOLRAD 3/GRAB 2 was launched on 29 June 1961 at 04:22 GMT on a Thor-Ablestar rocket, along with Transit 4A and the University of Iowa's Van Allen radiation belt Injun 1 satellite from Cape Canaveral, LC-17B. Its course to orbit was more northerly than that of its predecessors to avoid the possibility of fragments falling on Cuba in the event of a mission failure (as had happened with SOLRAD 2).

After reaching orbit, SOLRAD 3/GRAB 2 and Injun 1 separated from Transit 4A but not from each other, causing them to rotate more slowly than planned. Moreover, because electro-magnetic interference generated by the spacecraft prevented ground controllers from requesting data from both spacecraft at the same time, SOLRAD 3/GRAB 2's transmissions were limited to odd-numbered days, Injun's to even-numbered days; thus, data was only recovered for half of each satellite's lifetime.

Nevertheless, the SOLRAD package on the satellite made several important findings. It established the Sun's normal X-ray radiation levels during times of inactivity at levels below 14 Å in wavelength (less than 5×10^{−3} ergs/cm^{2}/sec). The satellite also found that the higher the hardness (energy level) of X-rays emitted during solar flares, the greater the disturbances and microwave bursts in the thermosphere, both affecting radio communications.

== GRAB results ==
The GRAB 2 portion of the satellite began transmission of information on Soviet radars starting 15 July 1961, returning a large volume of information over the next fourteen months. As opposed to the cautious approach exercised by former President Eisenhower, President Kennedy did not require personal authorization for the satellite to receive and transmit collected data. As a result, data was collected quicker than analysts could process, and by October 1961, a new automated analysis system was implemented not only to process the backlog of existing data but also data from upcoming electronic surveillance flights and even the Air Force's SAMOS reconnaissance satellites.

== Legacy and status ==
The SOLRAD/GRAB series flew twice more (both unsuccessful missions), finishing with the SOLRAD 4B mission launched 26 April 1962.

In 1962, all U.S. overhead reconnaissance projects were consolidated under the National Reconnaissance Office (NRO), which elected to continue and expand the GRAB mission starting July 1962 with a next-generation set of satellites, code-named POPPY. With the initiation of POPPY, SOLRAD experiments would no longer be carried on electronic spy satellites; rather, they would now get their own satellites, launched alongside POPPY missions to provide some measure of mission cover. Starting with SOLRAD 8, launched in November 1965, the final five SOLRAD satellites were scientific satellites launched singly, three of which were also given NASA Explorer program numbers. The last in this final series of SOLRAD satellites flew in 1976. In all, there were thirteen operational satellites in the SOLRAD series. The GRAB program was declassified in 1998.

As of 2026, SOLRAD 3 (COSPAR ID 1961-015B) is still in orbit, and its position can be tracked.

== See also ==
- General information on the SOLRAD project
- General information on the GRAB project
