= SOLRAD 8 =

Defunct satellite

Solrad 8
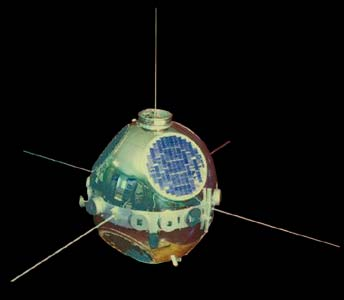
- Mission type: Solar science
- Operator: NASA
- COSPAR ID: 1965-093A
- SATCAT no.: 1738
- Mission duration: 60 years, 7 months and 2 days (in orbit)

Spacecraft properties
- Manufacturer: Naval Research Lab
- Launch mass: 56.7 kilograms (125 lb)

Start of mission
- Launch date: November 19, 1965, 22:11:30 UTC
- Rocket: Scout X-4
- Launch site: Wallops LA-3

End of mission
- Last contact: August 1967

Orbital parameters
- Reference system: Geocentric
- Regime: Circular orbit
- Eccentricity: 0.01302
- Perigee altitude: 704 kilometers (437 mi)
- Apogee altitude: 891 kilometers (554 mi)
- Inclination: 59.7 degrees
- Period: 100.8 minutes
- Epoch: 19 November 1965, 04:48:00 UTC

The SOLRAD 8,Explorer 30 or SE-A satellite was one of the NASA SOLRAD (Solar Radiation) program that began in 1960 to provide continuous coverage of solar radiation with a set of standard photometers. SOLRAD 8 was a spin-stabilized satellite oriented with its spin axis perpendicular to the sun-satellite line so that the 14 solar X-ray and ultraviolet photometers pointing radially outward from its equatorial belt viewed the sun on each revolution. Data were transmitted in real time by means of an FM / AM the satellite's telemetry system and were recorded by the stations on the Spacecraft Tracking and Data Acquisition Network (STADAN) tracking network.

== Mission ==
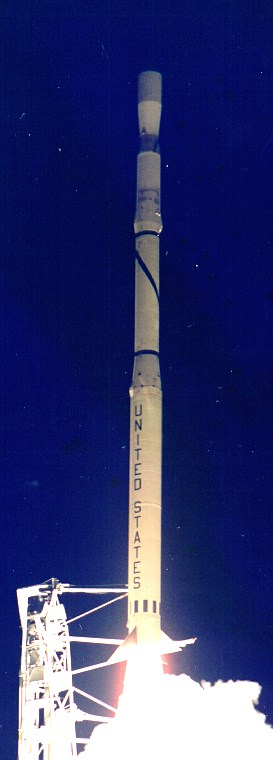
SOLRAD 8 launch

SOLRAD 8 was launched on November 19, 1965 on a Scout X-4 rocket from Wallops Flight Facility Launch Area 3.

The satellite performed normally, except for the spin system, which failed to maintain 60 rpm (at spin rates below 10 rpm data reduction became difficult). The spin rate gradually decreased to 4 rpm on September 12, 1966. At that time, ground command succeeded in reactivating spinup to 78 rpm, which exhausted the gas supply. From this point, the spin rate gradually decreased to 10 rpm in August 1967, when data collection was substantially decreased.

=== Eclipse 1966 ===
The satellite observed the solar eclipse on 20 May 1966. This observation may have been the first observation of a solar eclipse by an artificial satellite.

== Experiments ==
=== Solar X-Ray and Ultraviolet Monitor ===
This experiment was designed to monitor solar X-ray and ultraviolet emissions with a set of standardized detectors so that the data could be compared directly with that produced by other experiments in the SOLRAD series. Eight ion chambers and two Geiger counters covering the spectral regions from 0.5 Å to 60 Å and 1080 Å to 1350 Å were mounted perpendicular to the satellite spin axis. Analog outputs from the detectors were transmitted continuously on six IRIG telemetry channels. The experiment provided good data for all detectors from 27 November 1965 to 24 August 1967, with the following exceptions: (1) the Lyman-alpha detector and the UV detectors were saturated for normal aspect angles, (2) the core memory failed at launch so that the data were collected in real-time telemetry only, and (3) a gradual decrease in spin rate caused the aspect angle to drift away from normal in the second year of operation.

== See also ==
- Explorers program
