= Injun (satellite) =

Series of satellites by the University of Iowa

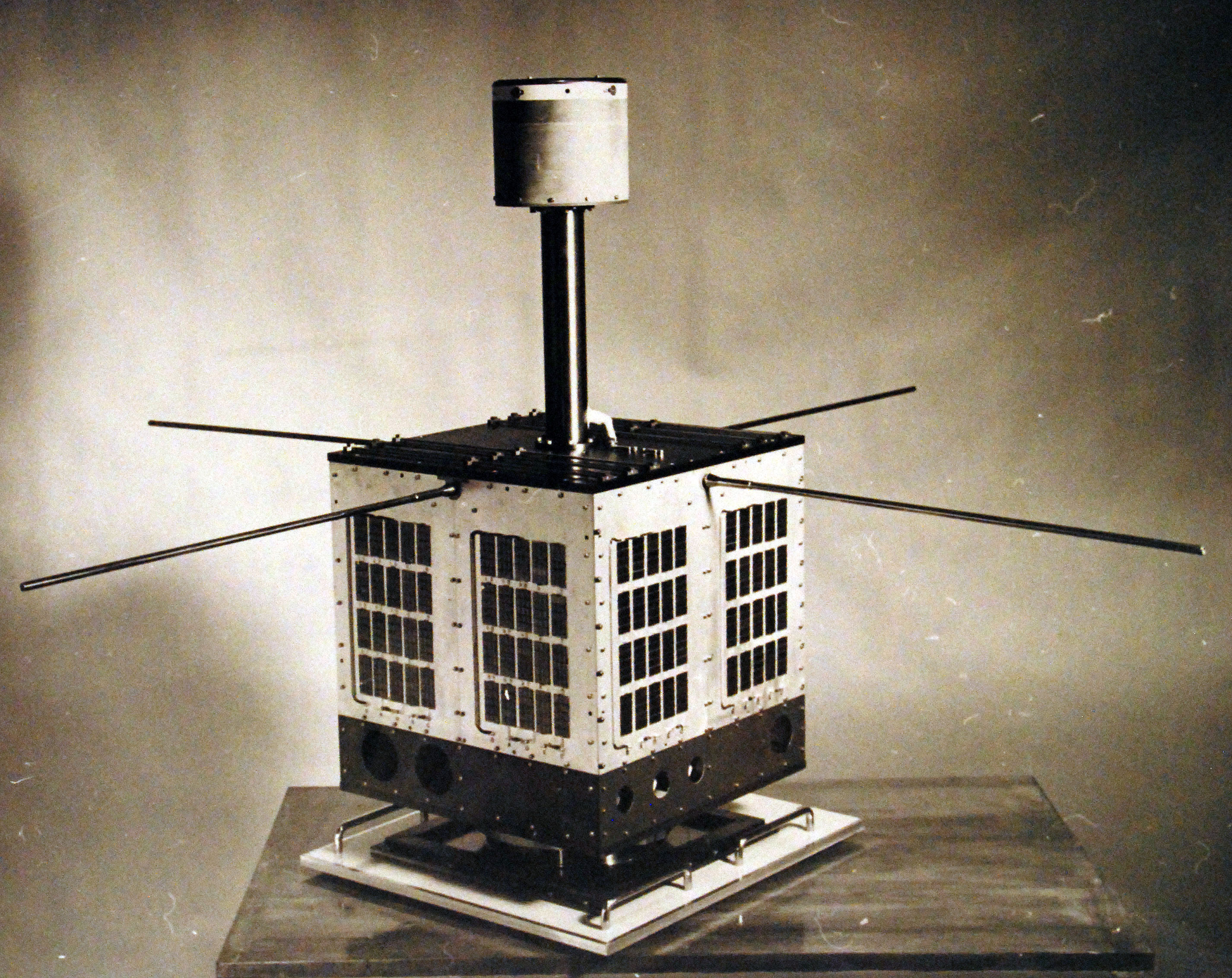
Injun 2 satellite

The Injun program was a series of six satellites designed and built by researchers at the University of Iowa to observe various radiation and magnetic phenomena in the ionosphere and beyond.

The design specifics of the satellites had little in common, though all were solar-powered and the first five used magnetic stabilization to control spacecraft attitude. (The last in the series was spin-stabilized.) Instruments included particle detectors of varying types, magnetometers, and photometers for observing auroras. The last three satellites were launched as part of the Explorer program of NASA.

In spite of various hardware difficulties and the loss of Injun 2 due to an upper stage failure, the program was generally successful. In particular, they produced data on the Van Allen radiation belts including electrical convection in the magnetosphere, and the radiation after effects of the Starfish Prime high-altitude nuclear test.

== Launch ==
Name	Also known as	Launched	Vehicle	Ceased operation	Notes
Injun 1		29 June 1961	Thor-Able	6 March 1963	Failed to separate from Solrad 3; still in orbit.
Injun 2		24 January 1962	Thor-Able	Failed to orbit	Upper stage produced insufficient thrust.
Injun 3		12 December 1962	Thor-Agena	25 August 1968	Deorbited on 25 August 1968.
Injun 4	IE-B, Explorer 25	21 November 1964	Scout X-4	December 1966	Still in orbit.
Injun 5	IE-C, Explorer 40	8 August 1968	Scout X-4	June 1971	Still in orbit.
Injun 6	IE-D, Hawkeye, Neutral Point Explorer, Explorer 52	3 June 1974	Scout X-4	28 April 1978	Main article: Explorer 52

== See also ==
- Donald Gurnett
