= Poppy (satellite) =

American surveillance satellites

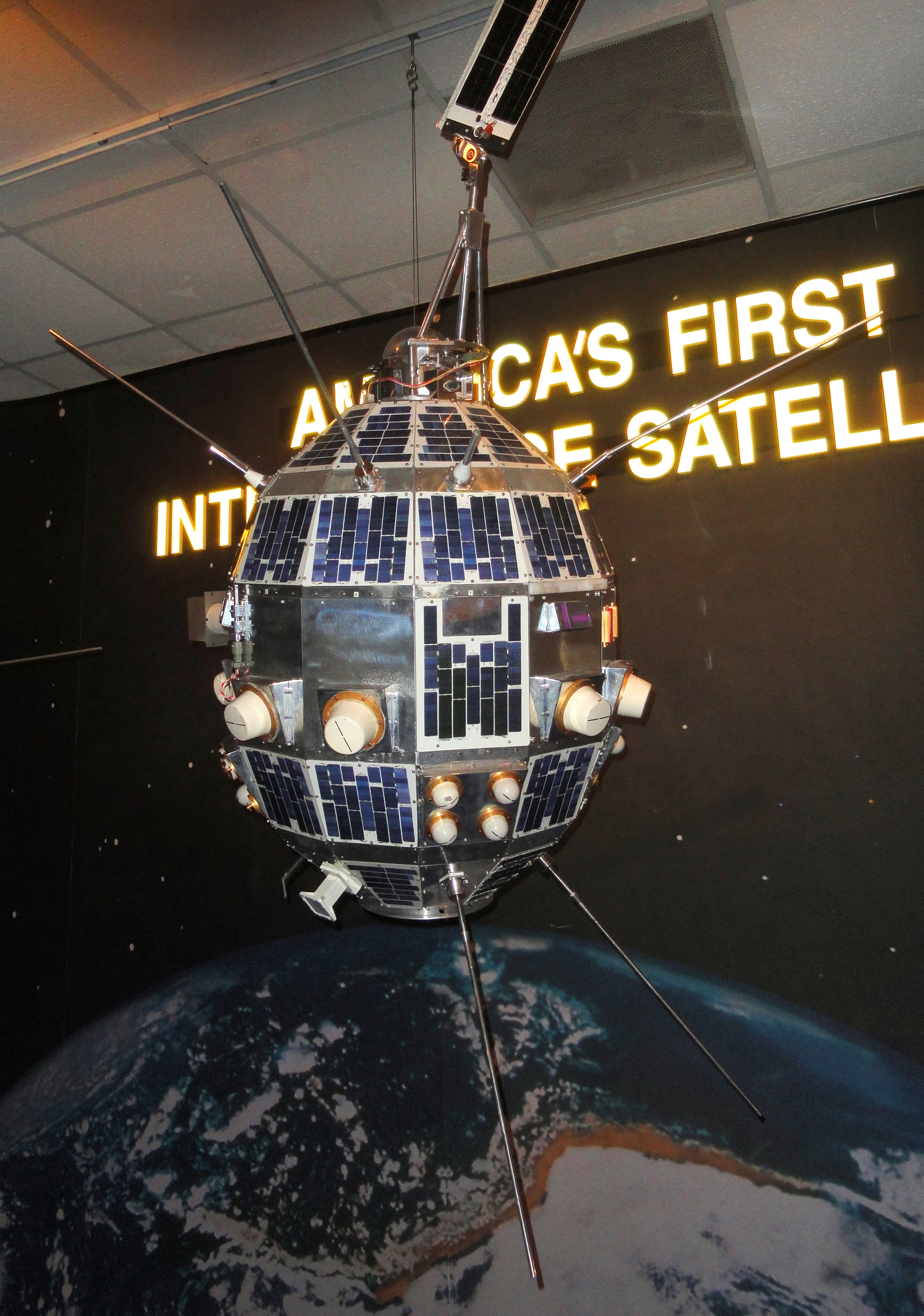
POPPY intelligence satellite

POPPY is the code name given to a series of U.S. intelligence satellites operated by the National Reconnaissance Office. The POPPY satellites recorded electronic signals intelligence (ELINT) data, targeting radar installations in the Soviet Union and Soviet naval ships at sea.

The POPPY program was a continuation within NRO's Program C of the Naval Research Laboratory's (NRL) Galactic Radiation and Background (GRAB) ELINT program, also known as Tattletale. The National Security Agency was given the responsibility of collecting, interpreting, and reporting the signals intercepted.

The existence of the POPPY program was declassified by the NRO in September 2005, although most of the details about its capabilities and operation are still classified. The NRO revealed, though, that the POPPY satellites, like other US signals intelligence (SIGINT) systems, used the principle of signals time difference of arrival, which enables precise locating of an object. All POPPY launches orbited multiple satellites. The first POPPY launch included two satellites, launch #2 and #3 three satellites each, and subsequent launches orbited four satellites each. The full configuration thus employed four vehicles in low Earth orbit.

There were seven launches of POPPY satellites from Vandenberg Air Force Base from 1962 until 1971, all of which were successful. The program continued until August 1977.

== Satellite blocks ==
The size and capabilities (in particular radio frequency coverage) of the POPPY satellites evolved over the course of the 19-year program. Block I POPPY satellites had a diameter of 20 inches (51 cm), identical to the diameter of the GRAB satellites. Two Block I satellites were launched with the first and third POPPY launch (Composite 2 and Composite 4), and one with the second POPPY launch (Composite 3). Block II POPPY satellites had a diameter of 24 inches (61 cm) and an increased weight. Two Block II satellites were launched on the second POPPY launch (Composite 3), one each on the third and fifth POPPY launch (Composite 4 and 6), and four on the fourth POPPY launch (Composite 5). Block III POPPY satellites had a diameter of 27 inches (69 cm) and again an increased weight. Three Block III satellites were launched on the fifth POPPY launch (Composite 6), and four each on the sixth and seventh POPPY launches (Composite 7 and 8).

Ammonia microthrusters were used for station keeping in order to maintain the orbital configuration of the POPPY constellation. Satellites used 2- or 3-axis gravity gradient stabilization.

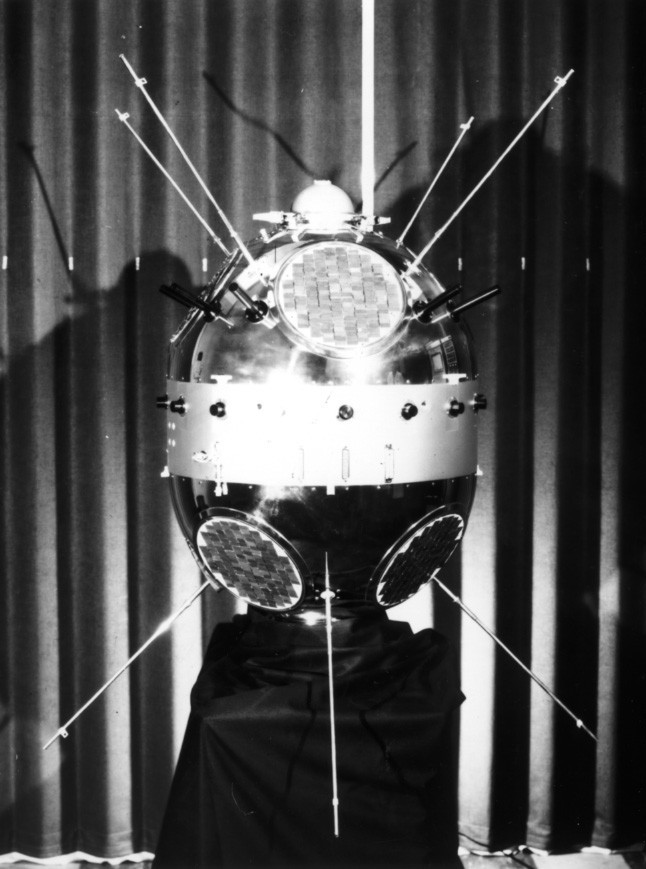
POPPY Block I (NRL Composite 2)

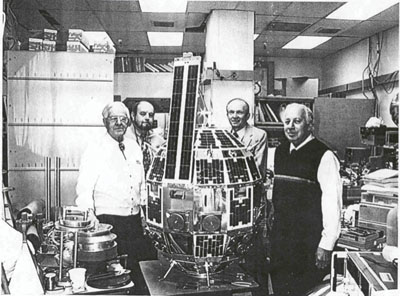
POPPY Block II (NRL Composite 3)

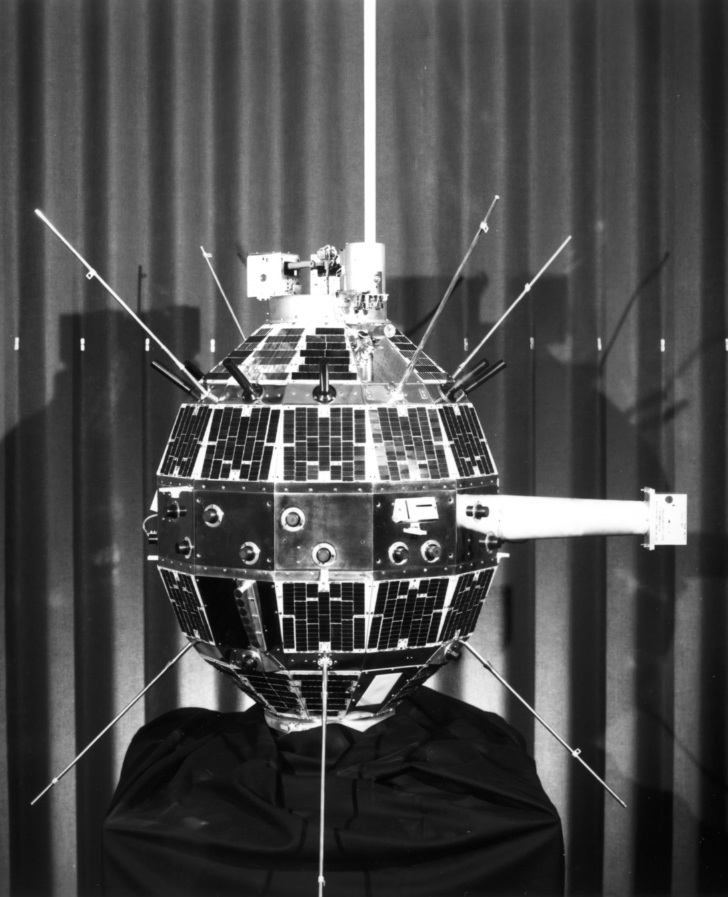
POPPY Block II (NRL Composite 3)

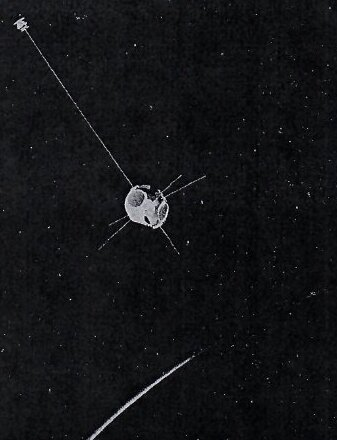
POPPY 3 (NRL Composite 4)

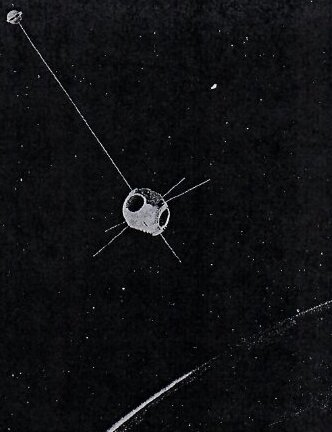
POPPY 4C (NRL Composite 5)

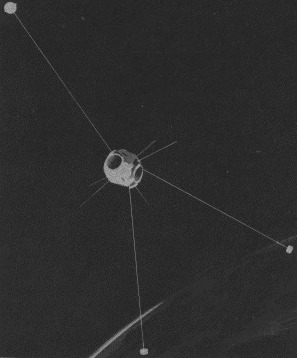
POPPY 4D (NRL Composite 5)

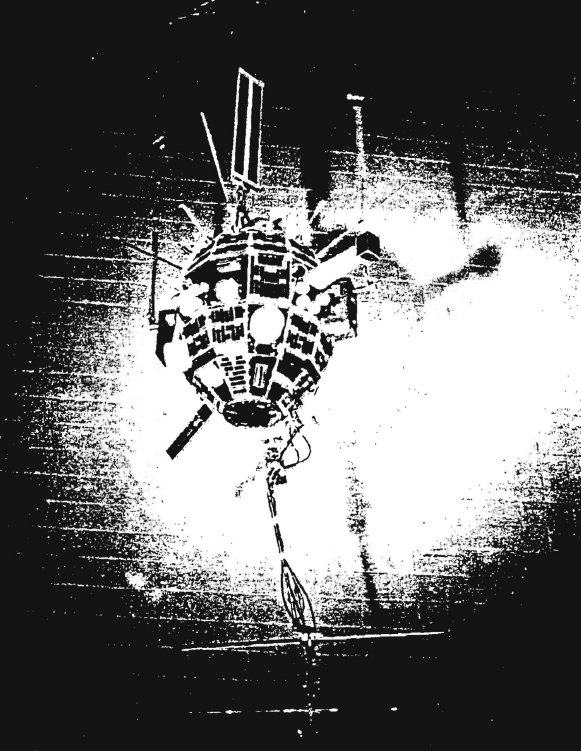
POPPY 7 (NRL Composite 8)

== Ground stations ==
POPPY satellites functioned in a store-and-dump mode. They recorded and stored data while passing over a target area, and later transmitted or "dumped" this stored information during their pass over a ground station. Known POPPY ground stations were located in Adak, AK, Lajes Field, Azores, Portugal, Edzell, Scotland, and Todendorf, Germany.

== Data collection and analysis ==
Among POPPY's tasks was the detection of signals originating from Soviet early warning radars located along the coastal regions of the USSR. Noticeable discoveries were the first recordings of the HEN HOUSE and TALL KING radars. In the operations building at each ground station, the recorded signals were analysed using Sonographs and Spectrum analyzers, and then compared with already known Emitter Library Notations (ELNOT). The analysis results were then sent under the Byeman Control System to NRL, where Signal Analysis Reports were created.

== Launches ==
Name	Launch date	International Designators	Other names	Launch vehicle
Poppy 1	13 December 1962	1962-067A, 1962-067C	NRL PL 120, 121 (NRL Composite 2)	Thor-Agena-D
Poppy 2	15 June 1963	1963-021E	NRL SR VI, PL 130, 112 (NRL Composite 3)	Thor-Agena-D
Poppy 3	11 January 1964	1964-001E	NRL PL 135, 124, 134 (NRL Composite 4)	TAT-Agena-D
Poppy 4	9 March 1965	1965-016A	NRL PL 142; SR 7B; GREB 6; GGSE 2, 3 (NRL Composite 5)	Thor-Agena-D
Poppy 5	31 May 1967	1967-053G, 1967-053H	NRL PL 151, 153; GGSE 4, 5 (NRL Composite 6)	Thor-Agena-D
Poppy 6	30 September 1969	1969-082D, 1969-082E, 1969-082F, 1969-082G (OPS 7613)	NRL PL 162, 163, 161, 164 (NRL Composite 7)	Thorad-Agena-D
Poppy 7	14 December 1971	1971-110A, 1971-110C, 1971-110D, 1971-110E (OPS 7898)	NRL PL 171, 172, 173, 174 (NRL Composite 8)	Thorad-Agena-D

== See also ==
- Naval Ocean Surveillance System
