= List of Thor DM-18 Agena-A launches =

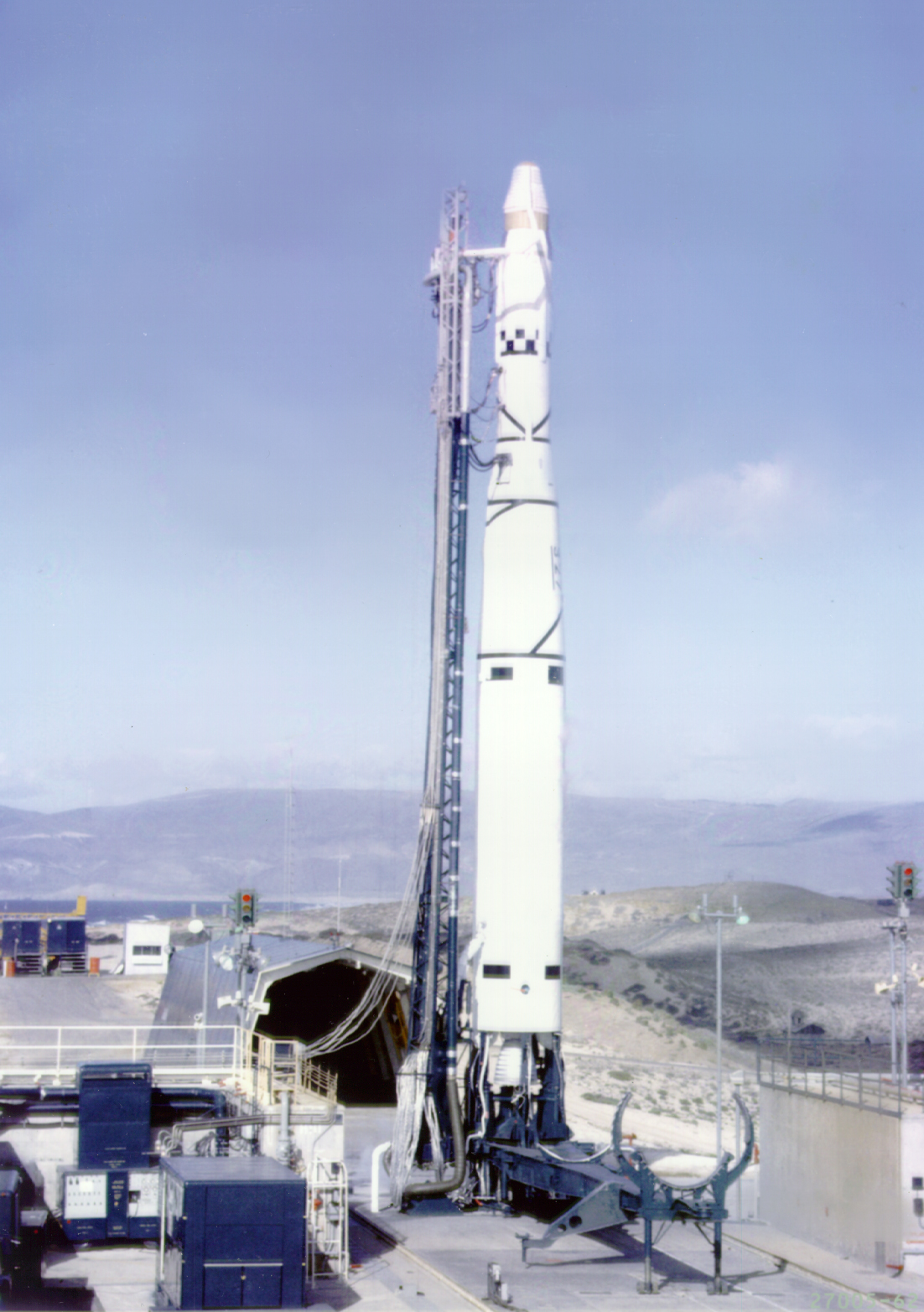
A Thor-Agena launch vehicle, ready to launch the Discoverer 37 (KH-3) spacecraft, on 13 January 1962

Thor DM-18 Agena A or just Thor-Agena was a series of orbital launch vehicles. The rockets used the Douglas-built Thor first stage and the Lockheed-built Agena second stages. They are thus cousins of the more-famous Thor-Deltas, which founded the Delta rocket family. The first attempted launch of a Thor-Agena was in January 1959. The first successful launch was on 28 February 1959, launching Discoverer 1. It was the first two-stage rocket to place a satellite into orbit.

== Launch statistics ==
=== Launch outcome ===
- Success
- Failure

=== Launchpad ===
- VAFB LC-75-3-4
- VAFB LC-75-3-5

== Launch history ==
The data in this table comes from and
Date/Time (UTC)	Rocket	S/N	Launch site	Payload	Function	Orbit	Outcome	Remarks
1959-02-28; 21:49:16	Thor DM-18 Agena-A	Thor 163; Agena 1022	VAFB LC-75-3-4	Discoverer 1	Reconnaissance	LEO	Failure	Maiden flight of Thor-Agena. Agena telemetry lost T+730 seconds. Fate of the payload unknown, but generally presumed to have impacted somewhere in Antarctica.
1959-04-13; 21:18:39	Thor DM-18 Agena-A	Thor 170; Agena 1018	VAFB LC-75-3-4	Discoverer 2	Reconnaissance	LEO	Success	
1959-06-03; 20:09:20	Thor DM-18 Agena-A	Thor 174; Agena 1020	VAFB LC-75-3-4	Discoverer 3	Reconnaissance	LEO	Failure	Agena attitude control malfunction pointed the stage in the wrong direction, sending it into the Pacific Ocean rather than orbit.
1959-06-25; 22:47:45	Thor DM-18 Agena-A	Thor 179; Agena 1023	VAFB LC-75-3-5	Discoverer 4	Reconnaissance	LEO	Failure	Agena developed insufficient thrust to attain orbital velocity.
1959-08-13; 19:00:08	Thor DM-18 Agena-A	Thor 192; Agena 1029	VAFB LC-75-3-4	Discoverer 5	Reconnaissance	LEO	Success	
1959-08-19; 19:24:44	Thor DM-18 Agena-A	Thor 200; Agena 1028	VAFB LC-75-3-5	Discoverer 6	Reconnaissance	LEO	Success	
1959-11-07; 20:28:41	Thor DM-18 Agena-A	Thor 206; Agena 1051	VAFB LC-75-3-4	Discoverer 7	Reconnaissance	LEO	Success	
1959-11-20; 19:25:24	Thor DM-18 Agena-A	Thor 212; Agena 1050	VAFB LC-75-3-5	Discoverer 8	Reconnaissance	LEO	Failure	Orbit too eccentric for use of return capsule
1960-02-04; 18:51:45	Thor DM-18 Agena-A	Thor 218; Agena 1052	VAFB LC-75-3-4	Discoverer 9	Reconnaissance	LEO	Failure	Premature Thor cutoff. Agena could not attain orbital velocity.
1960-02-19; 20:15:14	Thor DM-18 Agena-A	Thor 223; Agena 1054	VAFB LC-75-3-5	Discoverer 10	Reconnaissance	LEO	Failure	Thor flight control malfunction. RSO T+52 seconds.
1960-04-15; 20:30:37	Thor DM-18 Agena-A	Thor 234; Agena 1055	VAFB LC-75-3-5	Discoverer 11	Reconnaissance	LEO	Success	
1960-06-29; 22:00:44	Thor DM-18 Agena-A	Thor 160; Agena 1053	VAFB LC-75-3-4	Discoverer 12	Reconnaissance	LEO	Failure	Agena attitude control malfunction.
1960-08-10; 20:37:54	Thor DM-18 Agena-A	Thor 231; Agena 1057	VAFB LC-75-3-5	Discoverer 13	Reconnaissance	LEO	Success	First successful recovery of a manmade object from orbit.
1960-08-18; 19:57:08	Thor DM-18 Agena-A	Thor 237; Agena 1056	VAFB LC-75-3-4	Discoverer 14	Reconnaissance	LEO	Success	
1960-09-13; 22:14	Thor DM-18 Agena-A	Thor 246; Agena 1058	VAFB LC-75-3-5	Discoverer 15	Reconnaissance	LEO	Success	
