= List of Thor DM-18 launches =

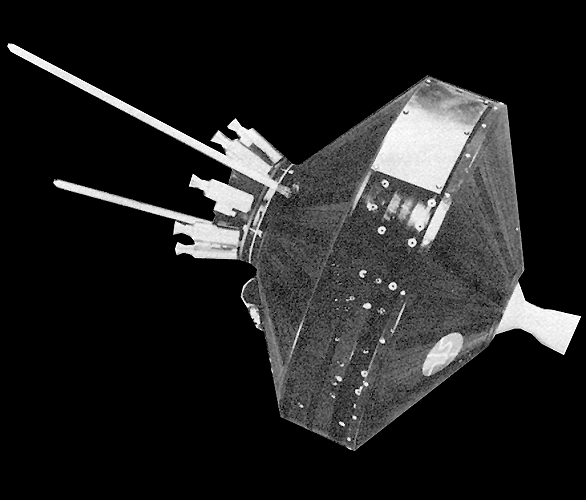
Thor DM-18 with Pioneer 1 at Cape Canaveral in Florida

Thor was a US space launch vehicle derived from the PGM-17 Thor intermediate-range ballistic missile. The Thor rocket was the first member of the Delta rocket family of space launch vehicles.

== Launch statistics ==
=== Launch outcome ===
- Failure
- Success
- Partial Failure

== Launch history ==
The data in this table comes from
Date/Time (UTC)	Rocket	S/N	Launch site	Payload	Function	Orbit	Outcome	Remarks
1957-01-26	Thor DM-18	Thor 101	CCAFS LC-17B		Missile test	Suborbital	Failure	Maiden flight of Thor, first launch from LC-17. Contaminated LOX caused loss of thrust at liftoff. Vehicle fell back onto the pad and exploded.
1957-04-20; 04:33	Thor DM-18	Thor 102	CCAFS LC-17B		Missile test	Suborbital	Failure	RSO sent a mistaken destruct command at T+35 seconds due to an incorrect console readout.
1957-08-30	Thor DM-18	Thor 104	CCAFS LC-17A		Missile test	Suborbital	Failure	First launch from LC-17A. Control malfunction led to missile breakup at T+92 seconds.
1957-09-20	Thor DM-18	Thor 105	CCAFS LC-17B		Missile test	Suborbital	Success	
1957-10-03; 17:14	Thor DM-18	Thor 107	CCAFS LC-17A		Missile test	Suborbital	Failure	Stuck valve prevented the gas generator from starting. Missile fell back onto the pad and exploded.
1957-10-11; 16:33	Thor DM-18	Thor 108	CCAFS LC-17B		Missile test	Suborbital	Failure	Turbopump failure at T+152 seconds. Flight considered a "partial success".
1957-10-24; 16:32	Thor DM-18	Thor 109	CCAFS LC-17A		Missile test	Suborbital	Success	
1957-12-07; 22:11	Thor DM-18	Thor 112	CCAFS LC-17B		Missile test	Suborbital	Success	
1957-12-19; 20:12	Thor DM-18	Thor 113	CCAFS LC-17A		Missile test	Suborbital	Success	
1958-01-28; 20:16	Thor DM-18	Thor 114	CCAFS LC-17A		Missile test	Suborbital	Failure	Electrical malfunction led to control failure. RSO T+152 seconds.
1958-02-28; 13:08	Thor DM-18	Thor 120	CCAFS LC-17B		Missile test	Suborbital	Failure	Premature engine shutdown at T+109 seconds.
1958-04-19; 13:30	Thor DM-18	Thor 121	CCAFS LC-17B		Missile test	Suborbital	Failure	Missile lost thrust and fell back onto the pad, exploding. Suspected fuel line obstruction.
1958-04-24; 00:10	Thor DM-18 Able	Thor 116	CCAFS LC-17A		RTV test	Suborbital	Failure	Maiden flight of Thor-Able. Turbopump failure T+146 seconds.
1958-06-04; 21:17	Thor DM-18	Thor 115	CCAFS LC-18B		Missile test	Suborbital	Success	First launch from LC-18B
1958-06-13; 15:06	Thor DM-18	Thor 122	CCAFS LC-17B		Missile test	Suborbital	Success	
1958-07-10; 15:06	Thor DM-18 Able	Thor 118	CCAFS LC-17A		RTV test	Suborbital	Success	
1958-07-13; 06:36	Thor DM-18	Thor 123	CCAFS LC-17B		Missile test	Suborbital	Success	Performance was normal through the boost phase, but the BECO and warhead separation signals were never received.
1958-07-23; 22:13	Thor DM-18 Able	Thor 119	CCAFS LC-17A		RTV test	Suborbital	Success	Biological nose cone containing a mouse. The nose cone sank into the ocean and was not recovered.
1958-07-26; 06:40	Thor DM-18	Thor 126	CCAFS LC-17B		Missile test	Suborbital	Failure	LOX valve malfunction led to loss of thrust and vehicle breakup at T+55 seconds
1958-08-06	Thor DM-18	Thor 117	CCAFS LC-18B		Missile test	Suborbital	Success	Final flight of Thor DM-18 missile
1958-08-17; 12:18	Thor DM-18 Able-I	Thor 127	CCAFS LC-17A	Pioneer 0	Lunar orbiter	High Altitude	Failure	Maiden flight of Thor-Able I. First use of a Thor-based vehicle for an orbital launch. Turbopump failure, T+73,6 seconds.
1958-10-11; 08:42:13	Thor DM-18 Able-I	Thor 130	CCAFS LC-17A	Pioneer 1	Lunar orbiter	High Altitude	Failure	Third stage underperformed
1958-11-05; 08:53	Thor DM-18A	Thor 138	CCAFS LC-17B		Missile test	Suborbital	Failure	Maiden flight of Thor DM-18A. Flight control failure. RSO T+45 seconds.
1958-11-08; 08:42:13	Thor DM-18 Able-I	Thor 129	CCAFS LC-17A	Pioneer 2	Lunar orbiter	High Altitude	Failure	Third stage failed to ignite
1958-11-26; 09:09	Thor DM-18A	Thor 140	CCAFS LC-17B		Missile test	Suborbital	Partial failure	Loss of guidance system power caused the missile to overshoot its target point by 22 miles.
1958-12-06; 00:41	Thor DM-18A	Thor 145	CCAFS LC-18B		Missile test	Suborbital	Partial failure	LOX tank pressurization failure led to loss of thrust. Missile impacted 20 miles short of the target point.
1958-12-16; 23:44:45	Thor DM-18A	Thor 151	VAFB LC-75-1-1		Missile test	Suborbital	Success	First Thor launch from Vandenberg AFB
1958-12-17; 04:00	Thor DM-18A	Thor 146	CCAFS LC-17B		Missile test	Suborbital	Success	
1958-12-31; 02:00	Thor DM-18A	Thor 138	CCAFS LC-18B		Missile test	Suborbital	Failure	Flight control failure. RSO T+40 seconds.
1959-01-23	Thor DM-18 Able-II	Thor 128	CCAFS LC-17A		RVX test	Suborbital	Failure	Thor portion of flight successful. Staging failed due to an electrical malfunction. Vehicle fell into the Atlantic Ocean.
1959-01-30; 23:53	Thor DM-18A	Thor 154	CCAFS LC-17B		Missile test	Suborbital	Success	
1959-02-28; 07:58	Thor DM-18 Able-II	Thor 131	CCAFS LC-17A		RVX test	Suborbital	Success	
1959-02-28; 21:49:16	Thor DM-18 Agena-A	Thor 163; Agena 1022	VAFB LC-75-3-4	Discoverer 1	Reconnaissance	LEO	Failure	Maiden flight of Thor-Agena. Agena telemetry lost T+730 seconds. Fate of the payload unknown, but generally presumed to have impacted somewhere in Antarctica.
1959-03-21; 06:19	Thor DM-18 Able-II	Thor 132	CCAFS LC-17A		RVX test	Suborbital	Success	
1959-03-22; 00:58	Thor DM-18A	Thor 158	CCAFS LC-18B		Missile test	Suborbital	Success	
1959-03-27; 04:02	Thor DM-18A	Thor 162	CCAFS LC-17B		Missile test	Suborbital	Success	
1959-04-08; 06:35	Thor DM-18 Able-II	Thor 133	CCAFS LC-17A		RVX test	Suborbital	Success	
1959-04-13; 21:18:39	Thor DM-18 Agena-A	Thor 170; Agena 1018	VAFB LC-75-3-4	Discoverer 2	Reconnaissance	LEO	Success	
1959-04-16; 20:46	Thor DM-18A	Thor 161	VAFB LC-75-2-8		Missile test	Suborbital	Success	
1959-04-23; 05:30	Thor DM-18A	Thor 176	CCAFS LC-17B		Missile test	Suborbital	Success	
1959-04-25; 05:00	Thor DM-18A	Thor 164	CCAFS LC-18B		Missile test	Suborbital	Success	
1959-05-12; 17:35	Thor DM-18A	Thor 187	CCAFS LC-17B		Missile test	Suborbital	Success	
1959-05-21; 06:40	Thor DM-18 Able-II	Thor 135	CCAFS LC-17A		RVX test	Suborbital	Success	
1959-05-23; 02:42	Thor DM-18A	Thor 184	CCAFS LC-18B		Missile test	Suborbital	Success	
1959-06-03; 20:09:20	Thor DM-18 Agena-A	Thor 174; Agena 1020	VAFB LC-75-3-4	Discoverer 3	Reconnaissance	LEO	Failure	Agena attitude control malfunction pointed the stage in the wrong direction, sending it into the Pacific Ocean rather than orbit.
1959-06-11; 06:44	Thor DM-18 Able-II	Thor 137	CCAFS LC-17A		RVX test	Suborbital	Success	
1959-06-16; 21:45	Thor DM-18A	Thor 191	VAFB LC-75-2-7		Missile test	Suborbital	Failure	Pitch and roll program failed to initiate. RSO T+50 seconds.
1959-06-25; 22:47:45	Thor DM-18 Agena-A	Thor 179; Agena 1023	VAFB LC-75-3-5	Discoverer 4	Reconnaissance	LEO	Failure	Agena developed insufficient thrust to attain orbital velocity.
1959-06-26	Thor DM-18A	Thor 198	CCAFS LC-18B		Missile test	Suborbital	Success	
1959-06-30; 02:37	Thor DM-18A	Thor 194	CCAFS LC-17B		Missile test	Suborbital	Success	
1959-07-21; 07:33	Thor DM-18A	Thor 203	CCAFS LC-17B		Missile test	Suborbital	Failure	Pitch and roll program failed to initiate. RSO T+40 seconds.
1959-07-24; 12:47	Thor DM-18A	Thor 202	CCAFS LC-18B		Missile test	Suborbital	Success	
1959-08-03; 21:41	Thor DM-18A	Thor 175	VAFB LC-75-1-1		Missile test	Suborbital	Success	
1959-08-06; 02:48	Thor DM-18A	Thor 208	CCAFS LC-17B		Missile test	Suborbital	Success	
1959-08-07; 14:24:20	Thor DM-18 Able-III	Thor 134	CCAFS LC-17A	Explorer 6	Radiation	HEO	Success	
1959-08-13; 19:00:08	Thor DM-18 Agena-A	Thor 192; Agena 1029	VAFB LC-75-3-4	Discoverer 5	Reconnaissance	LEO	Success	
1959-08-14; 09:00	Thor DM-18A	Thor 204	CCAFS LC-18B		Missile test	Suborbital	Success	
1959-08-14; 19:36:04	Thor DM-18A	Thor 190	VAFB LC-75-2-6		Missile test	Suborbital	Partial failure	Premature propellant depletion. Planned range not achieved.
1959-08-19; 19:24:44	Thor DM-18 Agena-A	Thor 200; Agena 1028	VAFB LC-75-3-5	Discoverer 6	Reconnaissance	LEO	Success	
1959-08-27; 12:30	Thor DM-18A	Thor 216	CCAFS LC-17B		Missile test	Suborbital	Success	
1959-09-12	Thor DM-18A	Thor 217	CCAFS LC-18B		Missile test	Suborbital	Success	
1959-09-17; 14:34	Thor DM-18 Able-II	Thor 136	CCAFS LC-17A	Transit 1A	Navigation	LEO	Failure	Third stage malfunctioned
1959-09-17; 21:09	Thor DM-18A	Thor 228	VAFB LC-75-1-2		Missile test	Suborbital	Success	
1959-09-22; 18:00	Thor DM-18A	Thor 222	CCAFS LC-17B		Missile test	Suborbital	Success	
1959-10-06; 16:41	Thor DM-18A	Thor 235	CCAFS LC-18B		Missile test	Suborbital	Success	
1959-10-06; 18:26	Thor DM-18A	Thor 239	VAFB LC-75-2-8		Missile test	Suborbital	Success	
1959-10-14; 04:15	Thor DM-18A	Thor 221	CCAFS LC-17B		Missile test	Suborbital	Success	
1959-10-21; 22:57	Thor DM-18A	Thor 220	VAFB LC-75-1-1		Missile test	Suborbital	Success	
1959-10-29; 02:12	Thor DM-18A	Thor 230	CCAFS LC-18B		Missile test	Suborbital	Success	
1959-11-03	Thor DM-18A	Thor 238	CCAFS LC-17B		Missile test	Suborbital	Success	
1959-11-07; 20:28:41	Thor DM-18 Agena-A	Thor 206; Agena 1051	VAFB LC-75-3-4	Discoverer 7	Reconnaissance	LEO	Success	
1959-11-12; 19:24	Thor DM-18A	Thor 181	VAFB LC-75-1-2		Missile test	Suborbital	Success	
1959-11-19	Thor DM-18A	Thor 244	CCAFS LC-17B		Missile test	Suborbital	Success	
1959-11-20; 19:25:24	Thor DM-18 Agena-A	Thor 212; Agena 1050	VAFB LC-75-3-5	Discoverer 8	Reconnaissance	LEO	Failure	Orbit too eccentric for use of return capsule
1959-12-01; 17:00	Thor DM-18A	Thor 254	CCAFS LC-18B		Missile test	Suborbital	Success	
1959-12-02; 05:29	Thor DM-18A	Thor 265	VAFB LC-75-1-1		Missile test	Suborbital	Failure	
1959-12-15; 02:14	Thor DM-18A	Thor 185	VAFB LC-75-1-2		Missile test	Suborbital	Failure	Flight control failure. Missile broke up T+60 seconds.
1959-12-17	Thor DM-18A	Thor 255	CCAFS LC-17B		Missile test	Suborbital	Success	
1960-01-14; 16:35	Thor DM-18C	Thor 256	CCAFS LC 18B		Missile test	Suborbital	Success	Maiden flight of Thor DM-18C
1960-01-21; 20:10	Thor DM-18A	Thor 215	VAFB LC-75-1-2		Missile test	Suborbital	Success	
1960-02-04; 18:51:45	Thor DM-18 Agena-A	Thor 218; Agena 1052	VAFB LC-75-3-4	Discoverer 9	Reconnaissance	LEO	Failure	Premature Thor cutoff. Agena could not attain orbital velocity.
1960-02-09; 17:11	Thor DM-18C	Thor 259	CCAFS LC-18B		Missile test	Suborbital	Success	
1960-02-19; 20:15:14	Thor DM-18 Agena-A	Thor 223; Agena 1054	VAFB LC-75-3-5	Discoverer 10	Reconnaissance	LEO	Failure	Thor flight control malfunction. RSO T+52 seconds.
1960-02-29	Thor DM-18C	Thor 263	CCAFS LC-18B		Missile test	Suborbital	Success	
1960-03-02; 20:06	Thor DM-18A	Thor 272	VAFB LC-75-2-8		Missile test	Suborbital	Success	
1960-03-11; 13:00	Thor DM-18 Able-IV	Thor 219	CCAFS LC 17A	Pioneer 5	Scientific	Heliocentric	Success	Only flight of Thor-Able IV
1960-04-01; 11:40:09	Thor DM-18 Able-II	Thor 148	CCAFS LC-17A	TIROS-1	Weather	SSO	Success	Final flight of Thor-Able
1960-04-15; 20:30:37	Thor DM-18 Agena-A	Thor 234; Agena 1055	VAFB LC-75-3-5	Discoverer 11	Reconnaissance	LEO	Success	
1960-06-22; 23:26	Thor DM-18A	Thor 233	VAFB LC-75-2-7		Missile test	Suborbital	Success	
1960-06-29; 22:00:44	Thor DM-18 Agena-A	Thor 160; Agena 1053	VAFB LC-75-3-4	Discoverer 12	Reconnaissance	LEO	Failure	Agena attitude control malfunction.
1960-08-10; 20:37:54	Thor DM-18 Agena-A	Thor 231; Agena 1057	VAFB LC-75-3-5	Discoverer 13	Reconnaissance	LEO	Success	First successful recovery of a manmade object from orbit.
1960-08-18; 19:57:08	Thor DM-18 Agena-A	Thor 237; Agena 1056	VAFB LC-75-3-4	Discoverer 14	Reconnaissance	LEO	Success	
1960-09-13; 22:14	Thor DM-18 Agena-A	Thor 246; Agena 1058	VAFB LC-75-3-5	Discoverer 15	Reconnaissance	LEO	Success	
1960-10-11; 21:53	Thor DM-18A	Thor 186	VAFB LC-75-2-8		Missile test	Suborbital	Success	
1960-12-13; 20:08	Thor DM-18A	Thor 267	VAFB LC-75-2-8		Missile test	Suborbital	Success	
1961-03-30; 05:13:43	Thor DM-18A	Thor 243	VAFB LC-75-2-7		Missile test	Suborbital	Success	
1961-06-20; 23:54	Thor DM-18A	Thor 276	VAFB LC-75-2-7		Missile test	Suborbital	Success	
1961-09-06; 22:30	Thor DM-18A	Thor 165	VAFB LE-7		Missile test	Suborbital	Success	
1961-12-06; 01:30	Thor DM-18A	Thor 214	VAFB LE-8		Missile test	Suborbital	Success	
1962-03-19; 23:28	Thor DM-18A	Thor 229	VAFB LE-7		Missile test	Suborbital	Success	
1962-06-19; 00:30	Thor DM-18A	Thor 269	VAFB LE-8		Missile test	Suborbital	Success	
