= 1960 in spaceflight (January–April) =

This is a list of spaceflights launched between January and April 1960. For launches between May and August, see 1960 in spaceflight (May–August), for launches between September and December, see 1960 in spaceflight (September–December). For an overview of the whole year, see 1960 in spaceflight.

== Orbital launches ==
- ← Jan
- Feb
- Mar
- Apr
- May
- Jun
- Jul
- Aug
- Sep
- Oct
- Nov
- Dec →

Date and time (UTC)	Rocket	Flight number	Launch site		LSP	
Date and time (UTC)	Payload (⚀ = CubeSat)	Operator	Orbit	Function	Decay (UTC)	Outcome
Date and time (UTC)	Remarks					
=== February ===
4 February; 18:51:45	(United States) Thor DM-18 Agena-A		(United States) Vandenberg LC 75-3-4		(United States) US Air Force	
4 February; 18:51:45	(United States) Discoverer 9 (KH-1 6/9006)	CIA DST	Intended: Low Earth (Polar)	Optical imaging	4 February	Launch failure
4 February; 18:51:45	(United States) SRV 113	CIA DST	Intended: Low Earth (Polar)	Film return	4 February	Launch failure
4 February; 18:51:45	Failed to reach orbit after premature cutoff of first stage.					
19 February; 20:15:14	(United States) Thor DM-18 Agena-A		(United States) Vandenberg LC 75-3-5		(United States) US Air Force	
19 February; 20:15:14	(United States) Discoverer 10 (KH-1 7/9007)	CIA DST	Intended: Low Earth (Polar)	Optical imaging	19 February	Launch failure
19 February; 20:15:14	(United States) SRV 110	CIA DST	Intended: Low Earth (Polar)	Film return	19 February	Launch failure
19 February; 20:15:14	Destroyed by range safety during ascent to orbit.					
26 February; 17:25	(United States) Atlas LV-3A Agena-A		(United States) Cape Canaveral LC-14		(United States) US Air Force	
26 February; 17:25	(United States) MIDAS-1	US Air Force	Intended: Low Earth	Missile defence	26 February	Launch failure
26 February; 17:25	Maiden flight of Atlas-Agena, upper stage failed to separate.					
← Jan; Feb; Mar; Apr; May; Jun; Jul; Aug; Sep; Oct; Nov; Dec →; === March ===
11 March; 13:00	(United States) Thor DM-18 Able-IV		(United States) Cape Canaveral LC-17A		(United States) US Air Force	
11 March; 13:00	(United States) Pioneer 5	NASA	Heliocentric	Scientific	In orbit	Successful
11 March; 13:00	Only flight of Thor-Able IV.					
23 March; 13:35:11	(United States) Juno II	AM-19C	(United States) Cape Canaveral LC-26B		(United States) ABMA	
23 March; 13:35:11	(United States) Explorer S-46	NASA	Intended: Highly elliptical	Radiation research	23 March	Launch failure
23 March; 13:35:11	Third stage failed to ignite.					
← Jan; Feb; Mar; Apr; May; Jun; Jul; Aug; Sep; Oct; Nov; Dec →; === April ===
1 April; 11:40:09	(United States) Thor DM-18 Able-II		(United States) Cape Canaveral LC-17A		(United States) US Air Force	
1 April; 11:40:09	(United States) TIROS-1 (Tiros-A)	NASA/NOAA	Low Earth	Weather	In orbit	Partial spacecraft failure
1 April; 11:40:09	Final flight of Thor-Able. Spacecraft ceased operations due to electrical system malfunction fifteen days short of planned end of mission.					
13 April; 12:02:36	(United States) Thor DM-21 Ablestar		(United States) Cape Canaveral LC-17A		(United States) US Air Force	
13 April; 12:02:36	(United States) Transit 1B	US Navy	Low Earth	Navigation; Technology	5 October 1967	Successful
13 April; 12:02:36	(United States) Solrad prototype	US Navy	Low Earth	Technology	17 July	Successful
13 April; 12:02:36	Maiden flight of Thor-Ablestar, first restart of an upper stage.					
15 April; 15:06:45	(Soviet Union) Luna (8K72)	L1-9/I-19AMS	(Soviet Union) Baikonur Site 1/5		(Soviet Union) RVSN	
15 April; 15:06:45	(Soviet Union) Luna E-3 №1	RVSN	Intended: Heliocentric	Lunar probe	15 April	Launch failure
15 April; 15:06:45	Second stage engine malfunctioned.					
15 April; 20:30:37	(United States) Thor DM-18 Agena-A		(United States) Vandenberg LC-75-3-5		(United States) US Air Force	
15 April; 20:30:37	(United States) Discoverer 11 (KH-1 8/9008)	CIA DST	Low Earth (Polar)	Optical imaging	26 April	Spacecraft failure
15 April; 20:30:37	(United States) SRV 103	CIA DST	Low Earth (Polar)	Film return	26 April	Spacecraft failure
15 April; 20:30:37	Spacecraft attitude control system malfunctioned, image recovery not attempted.					
16 April; 16:07:41	(Soviet Union) Luna (8K72)	L1-9A	(Soviet Union) Baikonur Site 1/5		(Soviet Union) RVSN	
16 April; 16:07:41	(Soviet Union) Luna E-3 №2	RVSN	Intended: Heliocentric	Lunar probe	16 April	Launch failure
16 April; 16:07:41	Blok-B booster separated less than a second after launch.					
← Jan; Feb; Mar; Apr; May; Jun; Jul; Aug; Sep; Oct; Nov; Dec →
For flights after 30 April, see 1960 in spaceflight (May–September)

== Suborbital launches ==
- ← Jan
- Feb
- Mar
- Apr
- May
- Jun
- Jul
- Aug
- Sep
- Oct
- Nov
- Dec →

Date and time (UTC)	Rocket	Flight number	Launch site		LSP	
Date and time (UTC)	Payload (⚀ = CubeSat)	Operator	Orbit	Function	Decay (UTC)	Outcome
Date and time (UTC)	Remarks					
=== January ===
7 January; 01:40	(United States) SM-65D Atlas		(United States) Cape Canaveral LC-13		(United States) US Air Force	
7 January; 01:40		US Air Force	Suborbital	Missile test	7 January	Successful
7 January; 01:40	Apogee: 1,800 kilometres (1,100 mi)					
8 January	(United States) UGM-27 Polaris A1		(United States) Cape Canaveral LC-29A		(United States) US Navy	
8 January		US Navy	Suborbital	Missile test	8 January	Successful
8 January	Apogee: 500 kilometres (310 mi)					
13 January; 21:07	(United States) UGM-27 Polaris A1		(United States) Cape Canaveral LC-29A		(United States) US Navy	
13 January; 21:07		US Navy	Suborbital	Missile test	13 January	Successful
13 January; 21:07	Apogee: 500 kilometres (310 mi)					
14 January; 16:35	(United States) PGM-17 Thor DM-18C		(United States) Cape Canaveral LC-18B		(United States) US Air Force	
14 January; 16:35		US Air Force	Suborbital	Missile test	14 January	Successful
14 January; 16:35	Apogee: 520 kilometres (320 mi)					
14 January	(United States) Aerobee-300		(United States) Eglin		(United States) US Air Force	
14 January	(United States) Tattletale PCC-1	NSA	Suborbital	SIGNIT; Technology	14 January	Successful
14 January	Apogee: 100 kilometres (62 mi)					
15 January; 04:52	(United States) Javelin		(United States) Wallops Island		(United States) US Air Force	
15 January; 04:52		NRL	Suborbital	Test flight	15 January	Successful
15 January; 04:52	Apogee: 670 miles (1,080 km)					
16 January; 22:35	(United States) Shotput		(United States) Wallops Island		(United States) NASA	
16 January; 22:35		NASA	Suborbital	Technology	16 January	Successful
16 January; 22:35	Apogee: 413 kilometres (257 mi), test of systems for Echo satellites					
18 January	(Soviet Union) R-12 Dvina		(Soviet Union) Kapustin Yar		(Soviet Union) RVSN	
18 January		RVSN	Suborbital	Missile test	18 January	Successful
18 January	Apogee: 402 kilometres (250 mi)					
19 January; 18:18	(United States) Aerobee-150 (Hi)		(United States) White Sands LC-35		(United States) US Air Force	
19 January; 18:18		US Air Force	Suborbital	Solar research	19 January	Successful
19 January; 18:18	Apogee: 210 kilometres (130 mi)					
20 January; 16:35	(Soviet Union) R-7A Semyorka		(Soviet Union) Baikonur Site 1/5		(Soviet Union) RVSN	
20 January; 16:35		RVSN	Suborbital	Missile test	20 January	Successful
20 January; 16:35	Apogee: 1,000 kilometres (620 mi)					
20 January	(United States) UGM-27 Polaris A1		(United States) Cape Canaveral LC-29A		(United States) US Navy	
20 January		US Navy	Suborbital	Missile test	20 January	Successful
20 January	Apogee: 500 kilometres (310 mi)					
21 January; 20:10 (GMT)	(United States) PGM-17 Thor DM-18A		(United States) Vandenberg LC-75-1-2		(United Kingdom) Royal Air Force	
21 January; 20:10 (GMT)		Royal Air Force	Suborbital	Missile test	21 January	Successful
21 January; 20:10 (GMT)	Apogee: 520 kilometres (320 mi)					
24 January; 16:15	(Soviet Union) R-7A Semyorka		(Soviet Union) Baikonur Site 1/5		(Soviet Union) RVSN	
24 January; 16:15		RVSN	Suborbital	Missile test	24 January	Launch failure
24 January; 16:15	Apogee: 20 kilometres (12 mi)					
26 January; 00:48	(United States) PGM-19 Jupiter		(United States) Cape Canaveral LC-26B		(United States) ABMA	
26 January; 00:48		US Air Force	Suborbital	Missile test	26 January	Successful
26 January; 00:48	Apogee: 500 kilometres (310 mi)					
26 January; 05:42	(United States) Javelin		(United States) Wallops Island		(United States) NASA	
26 January; 05:42		NASA	Suborbital	Test flight	26 January	Successful
26 January; 05:42	Apogee: 951 kilometres (591 mi)					
26 January; 23:43:05	(United States) SM-65D Atlas		(United States) Vandenberg LC-576A-3		(United States) US Air Force	
26 January; 23:43:05		US Air Force	Suborbital	Missile test	26 January	Successful
26 January; 23:43:05	Apogee: 1,800 kilometres (1,100 mi)					
27 January; 01:31	(United States) SM-65D Atlas		(United States) Cape Canaveral LC-13		(United States) US Air Force	
27 January; 01:31		US Air Force	Suborbital	Missile test	27 January	Successful
27 January; 01:31	Apogee: 1,800 kilometres (1,100 mi)					
27 January	(United States) UGM-27 Polaris A1		(United States) Cape Canaveral LC-29A		(United States) US Navy	
27 January		US Navy	Suborbital	Missile test	27 January	Successful
27 January	Apogee: 500 kilometres (310 mi)					
29 January; 18:51	(United States) Aerobee-150 (Hi)		(United States) White Sands LC-35		(United States) US Air Force	
29 January; 18:51		US Air Force	Suborbital	Solar	29 January	Successful
29 January; 18:51	Apogee: 226 kilometres (140 mi)					
29 January	(Soviet Union) R-12 Dvina		(Soviet Union) Kapustin Yar		(Soviet Union) RVSN	
29 January		RVSN	Suborbital	Missile test	29 January	Successful
29 January	Apogee: 402 kilometres (250 mi)					
31 January; 16:17	(Soviet Union) R-7A Semyorka		(Soviet Union) Baikonur Site 1/5		(Soviet Union) RVSN	
31 January; 16:17		RVSN	Suborbital	Missile test	31 January	Successful
31 January; 16:17	Apogee: 1,000 kilometres (620 mi)					
January	(United States) Nike-Cajun		(United States) White Sands		(United States) US Army	
January		US Army	Suborbital	Aeronomy	January	Successful
January	Apogee: 100 kilometres (62 mi)					
=== February ===
2 February; 18:08	(United States) HGM-25A Titan I		(United States) Cape Canaveral LC-19		(United States) US Air Force	
2 February; 18:08		US Air Force	Suborbital	Missile test	2 February	Successful
2 February; 18:08	Apogee: 1,000 kilometres (620 mi)					
4 February; 22:19	(United States) UGM-27 Polaris A1		(United States) Cape Canaveral LC-29A		(United States) US Navy	
4 February; 22:19		US Navy	Suborbital	Missile test	4 February	Successful
4 February; 22:19	Apogee: 500 kilometres (310 mi)					
5 February; 00:19	(United States) PGM-19 Jupiter		(United States) Cape Canaveral LC-6		(United States) ABMA	
5 February; 00:19		US Air Force	Suborbital	Missile test	5 February	Successful
5 February; 00:19	Apogee: 500 kilometres (310 mi)					
5 February; 21:46	(United States) HGM-25A Titan I		(United States) Cape Canaveral LC-16		(United States) US Air Force	
5 February; 21:46		US Air Force	Suborbital	RV test	5 February	Launch failure
10 February	(United States) UGM-27 Polaris A1		(United States) Cape Canaveral LC-29A		(United States) US Navy	
10 February		US Navy	Suborbital	Missile test	10 February	Successful
10 February	Apogee: 500 kilometres (310 mi)					
12 February; 04:11	(United States) SM-65D Atlas		(United States) Cape Canaveral LC-13		(United States) US Air Force	
12 February; 04:11		US Air Force	Suborbital	Missile test	12 February	Successful
12 February; 04:11	Apogee: 1,800 kilometres (1,100 mi)					
13 February; 00:43	(United States) Aerobee AJ10-34		(United States) White Sands LC-35		(United States) US Air Force	
13 February; 00:43		US Air Force	Suborbital	Aeronomy	13 February	Successful
13 February; 00:43	Apogee: 143 kilometres (89 mi)					
13 February	(Soviet Union) R-12 Dvina		(Soviet Union) Kapustin Yar		(Soviet Union) RVSN	
13 February		RVSN	Suborbital	Missile test	13 February	Launch failure
16 February; 20:48	(United States) Aerobee-150 (Hi)		(United States) Wallops Island		(United States) NASA	
16 February; 20:48		NASA	Suborbital	Test flight	16 February	Launch failure
16 February; 20:48	Apogee: 3 kilometres (1.9 mi)					
16 February	(United States) Aerobee-300		(United States) Eglin		(United States) US Air Force	
16 February	(United States) Tattletale PCC-2	NSA	Suborbital	SIGNIT; Technology	16 February	Successful
16 February	Apogee: 100 kilometres (62 mi)					
17 February; 01:00	(United States) Nike-Cajun		(United States) Eglin		(United States) US Air Force	
17 February; 01:00		US Air Force	Suborbital	Meteoroid research	17 February	Successful
17 February; 01:00	Apogee: 120 kilometres (75 mi)					
19 February; 17:11	(United States) PGM-17 Thor DM-18C		(United States) Cape Canaveral LC-18B		(United States) US Air Force	
19 February; 17:11		US Air Force	Suborbital	Missile test	19 February	Successful
19 February; 17:11	Apogee: 520 kilometres (320 mi)					
19 February; 17:18	(United States) Exos		(United States) Eglin		(United States) US Air Force	
19 February; 17:18		UMI	Suborbital	Cosmic ray research	19 February	Launch failure
19 February; 17:18	Apogee: 37 kilometres (23 mi)					
23 February	(France) Véronique		(France) Hammaguira Blandine		(France) CASDN	
23 February		CNRS	Suborbital	Aeronomy	23 February	Launch failure
23 February	Apogee: 50 kilometres (31 mi)					
24 February	(United States) HGM-25A Titan I		(United States) Cape Canaveral LC-15		(United States) US Air Force	
24 February		US Air Force	Suborbital	RV test	24 February	Successful
24 February	Apogee: 1,000 kilometres (620 mi)					
25 February; 18:02	(United States) MGM-31 Pershing I		(United States) Cape Canaveral LC-30A		(United States) US Army	
25 February; 18:02		US Army	Suborbital	Missile test	25 February	Successful
25 February; 18:02	Maiden flight of Pershing, apogee: 250 kilometres (160 mi)					
26 February	(United States) UGM-27 Polaris A1		(United States) Cape Canaveral LC-29A		(United States) US Navy	
26 February		US Navy	Suborbital	Missile test	26 February	Launch failure
26 February	Apogee: 10 kilometres (6.2 mi)					
27 February; 06:53	(United States) Aerobee-150 (Hi)		(Canada) Churchill		(United States) US Air Force	
27 February; 06:53		JHU	Suborbital	Auroral	27 February	Successful
27 February; 06:53	Apogee: 117 kilometres (73 mi)					
27 February; 23:20	(United States) Shotput		(United States) Wallops Island		(United States) NASA	
27 February; 23:20		NASA	Suborbital	Technology	27 February	Successful
27 February; 23:20	Apogee: 400 kilometres (250 mi), test of systems for Echo satellites					
29 February	(United States) PGM-17 Thor DM-18C		(United States) Cape Canaveral LC-18B		(United States) US Air Force	
29 February		US Air Force	Suborbital	Missile test	29 February	Successful
29 February	Apogee: 520 kilometres (320 mi)					
=== March ===
1 March; 22:11	(United States) Nike-Asp		(United States) Wallops Island		(United States) NASA	
1 March; 22:11		NASA	Suborbital	Solar	1 March	Successful
1 March; 22:11	Apogee: 212 kilometres (132 mi)					
2 March; 18:32	(France) Véronique		(France) Hammaguira Blandine		(France) CASDN	
2 March; 18:32		CNRS	Suborbital	Aeronomy	2 March	Successful
2 March; 18:32	Apogee: 188 kilometres (117 mi)					
2 March; 20:06	(United States) PGM-17 Thor DM-18A		(United States) Vandenberg LC-75-2-8		(United Kingdom) Royal Air Force	
2 March; 20:06		Royal Air Force	Suborbital	Missile test	2 March	Successful
2 March; 20:06	Apogee: 520 kilometres (320 mi)					
3 March; 22:50	(United States) Nike-Asp		(United States) Wallops Island		(United States) NASA	
3 March; 22:50		NASA	Suborbital	Solar	3 March	Successful
3 March; 22:50	Apogee: 212 kilometres (132 mi)					
5 March	(France) Véronique		(France) Hammaguira Blandine		(France) CASDN	
5 March		CNRS	Suborbital	Aeronomy	5 March	Successful
5 March	Apogee: 187 kilometres (116 mi)					
8 March; 13:10	(United States) SM-65D Atlas		(United States) Cape Canaveral LC-11		(United States) US Air Force	
8 March; 13:10		US Air Force	Suborbital	Missile test	8 March	Successful
8 March; 13:10	Apogee: 1,800 kilometres (1,100 mi), first use of inertial guidance					
8 March; 18:00	(United States) HGM-25A Titan I		(United States) Cape Canaveral LC-16		(United States) US Air Force	
8 March; 18:00		US Air Force	Suborbital	RV test	8 March	Launch failure
8 March; 18:00	Second stage malfunction					
9 March	(United States) UGM-27 Polaris A1		(United States) Cape Canaveral LC-25A		(United States) US Navy	
9 March		US Navy	Suborbital	Missile test	9 March	Successful
9 March	Apogee: 500 kilometres (310 mi)					
11 March; 00:36	(United States) SM-65D Atlas		(United States) Cape Canaveral LC-13		(United States) US Air Force	
11 March; 00:36		US Air Force	Suborbital	Missile test	11 March	Launch failure
16 March; 21:25	(United States) Aerobee-300		(Canada) Churchill		(United States) NASA	
16 March; 21:25		UMI	Suborbital	Ionospheric	16 March	Successful
16 March; 21:25	Apogee: 337 kilometres (209 mi)					
16 March	(United States) Aerobee-300		(United States) Eglin		(United States) US Air Force	
16 March	(United States) Tattletale PCC-3	NSA	Suborbital	SIGNIT; Technology	16 March	Successful
16 March	Apogee: 100 kilometres (62 mi)					
17 March; 01:52	(United States) Nike-Asp		(Canada) Churchill		(United States) NASA	
17 March; 01:52		UMI	Suborbital	Ionospheric	17 March	Launch failure
17 March; 23:55	(Soviet Union) R-7A Semyorka		(Soviet Union) Baikonur Site 1/5		(Soviet Union) RVSN	
17 March; 23:55		RVSN	Suborbital	Missile test	18 March	Successful
17 March; 23:55	Apogee: 1,350 kilometres (840 mi)					
18 March	(United States) UGM-27 Polaris A1		(United States) Cape Canaveral LC-25B		(United States) US Navy	
18 March		US Navy	Suborbital	Missile test	18 March	Successful
18 March	Apogee: 500 kilometres (310 mi)					
20 March	(Soviet Union) R-12 Dvina		(Soviet Union) Kapustin Yar		(Soviet Union) RVSN	
20 March		RVSN	Suborbital	Missile test	20 March	Successful
20 March	Apogee: 402 kilometres (250 mi)					
22 March	(United States) HGM-25A Titan I		(United States) Cape Canaveral LC-15		(United States) US Air Force	
22 March		US Air Force	Suborbital	RV test	22 March	Successful
22 March	Apogee: 1,000 kilometres (620 mi)					
22 March	(United States) Astrobee-500		(United States) Eglin		(United States) US Air Force	
22 March		US Air Force	Suborbital	Test flight	22 March	Launch failure
24 March; 02:06	(Soviet Union) R-7A Semyorka		(Soviet Union) Baikonur Site 1/5		(Soviet Union) RVSN	
24 March; 02:06		RVSN	Suborbital	Missile test	24 March	Successful
24 March; 02:06	Apogee: 1,350 kilometres (840 mi)					
24 March	(Soviet Union) R-12 Dvina		(Soviet Union) Kapustin Yar		(Soviet Union) RVSN	
24 March		RVSN	Suborbital	Missile test	24 March	Successful
24 March	Apogee: 402 kilometres (250 mi)					
25 March; 18:40	(United States) Aerobee-150A		(United States) Wallops Island		(United States) NASA	
25 March; 18:40		NASA	Suborbital	Test flight	25 March	Successful
25 March; 18:40	Apogee: 212 kilometres (132 mi)					
25 March	(Soviet Union) R-12 Dvina		(Soviet Union) Kapustin Yar		(Soviet Union) RVSN	
25 March		RVSN	Suborbital	Missile test	25 March	Successful
25 March	Apogee: 402 kilometres (250 mi)					
25 March	(United States) UGM-27 Polaris A1		(United States) Cape Canaveral LC-25B		(United States) US Navy	
25 March		US Navy	Suborbital	Missile test	25 March	Successful
25 March	Apogee: 500 kilometres (310 mi)					
28 March	(Soviet Union) R-12 Dvina		(Soviet Union) Kapustin Yar		(Soviet Union) RVSN	
28 March		RVSN	Suborbital	Missile test	28 March	Successful
28 March	Apogee: 402 kilometres (250 mi)					
29 March	(United States) Trailblazer 1		(United States) Wallops Island		(United States) NASA	
29 March		NASA	Suborbital	RV test	29 March	Successful
29 March	Apogee: 260 kilometres (160 mi)					
29 March	(United States) UGM-27 Polaris A1		(United States) USNS Observation Island, ETR		(United States) US Navy	
29 March		US Navy	Suborbital	Missile test	29 March	Launch failure
29 March	Apogee: 300 kilometres (190 mi)					
29 March	(Soviet Union) R-12 Dvina		(Soviet Union) Kapustin Yar		(Soviet Union) RVSN	
29 March		RVSN	Suborbital	Missile test	29 March	Successful
29 March	Apogee: 402 kilometres (250 mi)					
31 March	(Soviet Union) R-12 Dvina		(Soviet Union) Kapustin Yar		(Soviet Union) RVSN	
31 March		RVSN	Suborbital	Missile test	31 March	Successful
31 March	Apogee: 402 kilometres (250 mi)					
March	(Soviet Union) R-13		(Soviet Union) Kapustin Yar		(Soviet Union) RVSN	
March		RVSN	Suborbital	Missile test	March	Successful
March	Apogee: 150 kilometres (93 mi)					
=== April ===
1 April	(United States) Shotput		(United States) Wallops Island		(United States) NASA	
1 April		NASA	Suborbital	Technology	1 April	Successful
1 April	Apogee: 400 kilometres (250 mi), test of systems for Echo satellites					
7 April; 02:06	(United States) Aerobee-150 (Hi)		(United States) Eglin		(United States) US Air Force	
7 April; 02:06		US Air Force	Suborbital	Solar	7 April	Successful
7 April; 02:06	Apogee: 236 kilometres (147 mi)					
8 April; 02:06	(United States) SM-65D Atlas		(United States) Cape Canaveral LC-11		(United States) US Air Force	
8 April; 02:06		US Air Force	Suborbital	Missile test	8 April	Launch failure
8 April; 02:06	Propulsion system malfunction, apogee: 1 kilometre (0.62 mi)					
8 April; 12:04	(United States) Nike-Cajun		(Canada) Churchill		(United States) US Air Force	
8 April; 12:04		BRL	Suborbital	Aeronomy	8 April	Successful
8 April; 12:04	Apogee: 100 kilometres (62 mi)					
8 April	(United States) HGM-25A Titan I		(United States) Cape Canaveral LC-16		(United States) US Air Force	
8 April		US Air Force	Suborbital	RV test	8 April	Successful
8 April	Apogee: 1,000 kilometres (620 mi)					
12 April; 03:18	(United Kingdom) Skylark-2C		(Australia) Woomera LA-2		(United Kingdom) RAE	
12 April; 03:18		RAE	Suborbital	Test flight	12 April	Successful
12 April; 03:18	Apogee: 218 kilometres (135 mi)					
18 April; 23:09	(United States) Scout X		(United States) Wallops Island LA-3		(United States) NASA	
18 April; 23:09	(United States) Cub Scout	NASA	Suborbital	Test flight	18 April	Launch failure
18 April; 23:09	Maiden flight of Scout family, only flight of Scout X, structural Failure during staging, apogee: 48 kilometres (30 mi)					
18 April	(United States) UGM-27 Polaris A1		(United States) USNS Observation Island, ETR		(United States) US Navy	
18 April		US Navy	Suborbital	Missile test	18 April	Launch failure
18 April	Apogee: 50 kilometres (31 mi)					
19 April; 14:15	(United States) Aerobee-150 (Hi)		(United States) White Sands		(United States) NRL	
19 April; 14:15		NRL	Suborbital	Solar	19 April	Successful
19 April; 14:15	Apogee: 222 kilometres (138 mi)					
20 April; 18:30	(United States) MGM-31 Pershing I		(United States) Cape Canaveral LC-30A		(United States) US Army	
20 April; 18:30		US Army	Suborbital	Missile test	20 April	Successful
20 April; 18:30	Apogee: 250 kilometres (160 mi)					
20 April	(United States) Viper (ALSOR)		(United States) F-104, Edwards		(United States) NASA	
20 April		NASA	Suborbital	Test flight	20 April	Launch failure
20 April	Apogee: 70 kilometres (43 mi)					
21 April; 10:35	(United Kingdom) Skylark-2		(Australia) Woomera LA-2		(United Kingdom) RAE	
21 April; 10:35		UCL	Suborbital	Aeronomy	21 April	Successful
21 April; 10:35	Apogee: 141 kilometres (88 mi)					
21 April; 15:00	(United States) Aerobee-150 (Hi)		(United States) Eglin		(United States) US Air Force	
21 April; 15:00		US Air Force	Suborbital	Fields research	21 April	Successful
21 April; 15:00	Apogee: 245 kilometres (152 mi)					
21 April; 20:55	(United States) HGM-25A Titan I		(United States) Cape Canaveral LC-15		(United States) US Air Force	
21 April; 20:55		US Air Force	Suborbital	RV test	21 April	Successful
21 April; 20:55	Apogee: 1,000 kilometres (620 mi)					
22 April; 19:39:01	(United States) SM-65D Atlas		(United States) Vandenberg LC-576B-2		(United States) US Air Force	
22 April; 19:39:01		US Air Force	Suborbital	Missile test	22 April	Successful
22 April; 19:39:01	Apogee: 1,800 kilometres (1,100 mi)					
23 April; 21:45	(United States) Aerobee-150A		(United States) Wallops Island		(United States) NASA	
23 April; 21:45		NASA	Suborbital	Test flight	23 April	Successful
23 April; 21:45	Apogee: 246 kilometres (153 mi)					
26 April; 01:13	(United States) UGM-27 Polaris A1		(United States) Cape Canaveral LC-29A		(United States) US Navy	
26 April; 01:13		US Navy	Suborbital	Missile test	26 April	Successful
26 April; 01:13	Apogee: 500 kilometres (310 mi)					
26 April	(United States) Honest John-Nike-Gosling		(United States) Wallops Island		(United States) NASA	
26 April		NASA	Suborbital	RV test	26 April	Launch failure
26 April	Apogee: 43 kilometres (27 mi)					
27 April; 04:18	(United States) Aerobee-150 (Hi)		(United States) Wallops Island		(United States) NASA	
27 April; 04:18		NASA	Suborbital	UV Astronomy	27 April	Successful
27 April; 04:18	Apogee: 200 kilometres (120 mi)					
27 April; 21:56	(United States) Nike-Asp		(United States) Wallops Island		(United States) NASA	
27 April; 21:56		NASA	Suborbital	Solar	27 April	Launch failure
27 April; 21:56	Apogee: 24 kilometres (15 mi)					
28 April; 14:50	(United States) Nike Zeus		(United States) White Sands LC-38		(United States) US Army	
28 April; 14:50		US Army	Suborbital	Test flight	28 April	Successful
28 April; 14:50	Apogee: 150 kilometres (93 mi)					
28 April; 20:18	(United States) HGM-25A Titan I		(United States) Cape Canaveral LC-16		(United States) US Air Force	
28 April; 20:18		US Air Force	Suborbital	RV test	28 April	Successful
28 April; 20:18	Apogee: 1,000 kilometres (620 mi)					
29 April; 15:47	(United States) Aerobee-150A		(United States) Wallops Island		(United States) NASA	
29 April; 15:47		NASA	Suborbital	Aeronomy	29 April	Successful
29 April; 15:47	Apogee: 242 kilometres (150 mi)					
29 April; 23:45	(United States) UGM-27 Polaris A1		(United States) Cape Canaveral LC-29A		(United States) US Navy	
29 April; 23:45		US Navy	Suborbital	Missile test	29 April	Successful
29 April; 23:45	Apogee: 500 kilometres (310 mi)					
29 April	(Soviet Union) R-12 Dvina		(Soviet Union) Kapustin Yar		(Soviet Union) RVSN	
29 April		RVSN	Suborbital	Missile test	29 April	Successful
29 April	Apogee: 402 kilometres (250 mi)					
30 April; 03:45	(United States) UGM-27 Polaris A1		(United States) Cape Canaveral LC-25A		(United States) US Navy	
30 April; 03:45		US Navy	Suborbital	Missile test	30 April	Successful
30 April; 03:45	Apogee: 500 kilometres (310 mi)					
=== May ===
2 May	(France) OPd-56-39-22D (Antares)		(France) CERES		(France) ONERA	
2 May		ONERA	Suborbital	RV test	2 May	Successful
2 May	Apogee: 150 kilometres (93 mi)					
2 May	(France) OPd-56-39-22D (Antares)		(France) CERES		(France) ONERA	
2 May		ONERA	Suborbital	RV test	2 May	Successful
2 May	Apogee: 150 kilometres (93 mi)					
5 May	(Soviet Union) R-12 Dvina		(Soviet Union) Kapustin Yar		(Soviet Union) RVSN	
5 May		RVSN	Suborbital	Missile test	5 May	Successful
5 May	Apogee: 402 kilometres (250 mi)					
5 May	(France) OPd-56-39-22D (Antares)		(France) CERES		(France) ONERA	
5 May		ONERA	Suborbital	RV test	5 May	Successful
5 May	Apogee: 150 kilometres (93 mi)					
6 May; 16:47:02	(United States) SM-65D Atlas		(United States) Vandenberg LC-576B-2		(United States) US Air Force	
6 May; 16:47:02		US Air Force	Suborbital	Missile test	6 May	Launch failure
6 May; 16:47:02	Apogee: 2 kilometres (1.2 mi)					
6 May	(Soviet Union) R-12 Dvina		(Soviet Union) Kapustin Yar		(Soviet Union) RVSN	
6 May		RVSN	Suborbital	Missile test	6 May	Successful
6 May	Apogee: 402 kilometres (250 mi)					
10 May; 16:00	(United States) MGM-31 Pershing I		(United States) Cape Canaveral LC-30A		(United States) US Army	
10 May; 16:00		US Army	Suborbital	Missile test	10 May	Successful
10 May; 16:00	Apogee: 250 kilometres (160 mi)					
13 May; 21:25	(United States) HGM-25A Titan I		(United States) Cape Canaveral LC-15		(United States) US Air Force	
13 May; 21:25		US Air Force	Suborbital	RV test	13 May	Successful
13 May; 21:25	Apogee: 1,000 kilometres (620 mi)					
18 May; 21:04	(Canada) Black Brant I		(Canada) Churchill		(Canada) CARDE	
18 May; 21:04		CARDE	Suborbital	Test flight	18 May	Launch failure
18 May; 21:04	Apogee: 89 kilometres (55 mi)					
18 May	(United States) UGM-27 Polaris A1		(United States) Cape Canaveral LC-25B		(United States) US Navy	
18 May		US Navy	Suborbital	Missile test	18 May	Successful
18 May	Apogee: 500 kilometres (310 mi)					
20 May; 15:00	(United States) SM-65D Atlas		(United States) Cape Canaveral LC-12		(United States) US Air Force	
20 May; 15:00		US Air Force	Suborbital	Missile test	20 May	Successful
20 May; 15:00	Apogee: 1,800 kilometres (1,100 mi), set distance record of 14,548 kilometres (9,040 mi) for suborbital spaceflight					
23 May	(United States) UGM-27 Polaris A1		(United States) USNS Observation Island, ETR		(United States) US Navy	
23 May		US Navy	Suborbital	Missile test	23 May	Successful
23 May	Apogee: 500 kilometres (310 mi)					
24 May; 08:57	(United States) Nike-Asp		(United States) Wallops Island		(United States) NASA	
24 May; 08:57		GCA	Suborbital	Aeronomy	24 May	Launch failure
24 May; 08:57	Apogee: 24 kilometres (15 mi)					
24 May; 11:30	(United Kingdom) Black Knight 201		(Australia) Woomera LA-5A		(United Kingdom) RAE	
24 May; 11:30		RAE	Suborbital	RV test	24 May	Launch failure
24 May; 11:30	Gaslight test, apogee: 563 kilometres (350 mi)					
24 May; 16:40	(United States) Aerobee-150 (Hi)		(United States) Eglin		(United States) US Air Force	
24 May; 16:40		US Air Force	Suborbital	Ionospheric	24 May	Successful
24 May; 16:40	Apogee: 269 kilometres (167 mi)					
24 May; 17:44	(Canada) Black Brant I		(Canada) Churchill		(Canada) CARDE	
24 May; 17:44		CARDE	Suborbital	Test flight	24 May	Successful
24 May; 17:44	Apogee: 171 kilometres (106 mi)					
25 May; 00:48	(United States) Nike-Asp		(United States) Wallops Island		(United States) NASA	
25 May; 00:48		GCA	Suborbital	Aeronomy	25 May	Successful
25 May; 00:48	Apogee: 199 kilometres (124 mi)					
25 May; 22:00	(United States) Nike-Asp		(United States) Wallops Island		(United States) NASA	
25 May; 22:00		NASA	Suborbital	Solar	25 May	Successful
25 May; 22:00	Apogee: 193 kilometres (120 mi)					
27 May; 04:05	(United States) Aerobee-150 (Hi)		(United States) White Sands LC-35		(United States) NRL	
27 May; 04:05			Suborbital	UV Astronomy	27 May	Successful
27 May; 04:05	Apogee: 193 kilometres (120 mi)					
27 May; 05:30	(United States) Aerobee-150A		(United States) Wallops Island		(United States) NASA	
27 May; 05:30		NASA	Suborbital	UV Astronomy	27 May	Successful
27 May; 05:30	Apogee: 215 kilometres (134 mi)					
27 May; 17:20	(United States) HGM-25A Titan I		(United States) Cape Canaveral LC-16		(United States) US Air Force	
27 May; 17:20		US Air Force	Suborbital	RV test	27 May	Successful
27 May; 17:20	Apogee: 1,000 kilometres (620 mi)					
28 May; 18:27	(Canada) Black Brant I		(Canada) Churchill		(Canada) CARDE	
28 May; 18:27		CARDE	Suborbital	Test flight	28 May	Successful
28 May; 18:27	Apogee: 177 kilometres (110 mi)					
30 May	(Soviet Union) R-12 Dvina		(Soviet Union) Kapustin Yar		(Soviet Union) RVSN	
30 May		RVSN	Suborbital	Missile test	30 May	Successful
30 May	Apogee: 402 kilometres (250 mi)					
31 May	(United States) Shotput		(United States) Wallops Island		(United States) NASA	
31 May		NASA	Suborbital	Technology	31 May	Successful
31 May	Apogee: 400 kilometres (250 mi), test of systems for Echo satellites					
May	(Soviet Union) R-12 Dvina		(Soviet Union) Kapustin Yar		(Soviet Union) RVSN	
May		RVSN	Suborbital	Missile test	May	Successful
May	Apogee: 402 kilometres (250 mi)					
=== June ===
4 June; 15:49	(Soviet Union) R-7 Semyorka		(Soviet Union) Baikonur Site 1/5		(Soviet Union) RVSN	
4 June; 15:49		RVSN	Suborbital	Missile test	4 June	Successful
4 June; 15:49	Apogee: 1,350 kilometres (840 mi)					
6 June; 17:10	(United States) Nike-Cajun		(Canada) Churchill		(United States) NASA	
6 June; 17:10		NASA	Suborbital	Magnetospheric	6 June	Successful
6 June; 17:10	Apogee: 122 kilometres (76 mi)					
6 June	(Soviet Union) R-14 Chusovaya		(Soviet Union) Kapustin Yar		(Soviet Union) RVSN	
6 June		RVSN	Suborbital	Missile test	6 June	Successful
6 June	Maiden flight of R-14, apogee: 675 kilometres (419 mi)					
7 June	(United States) UGM-27 Polaris A1		(United States) Cape Canaveral LC-25A		(United States) US Navy	
7 June		US Navy	Suborbital	Missile test	7 June	Launch failure
7 June	Apogee: 50 kilometres (31 mi)					
9 June; 16:19	(United States) MGM-31 Pershing I		(United States) Cape Canaveral LC-30A		(United States) US Army	
9 June; 16:19		US Army	Suborbital	Missile test	9 June	Successful
9 June; 16:19	Apogee: 250 kilometres (160 mi)					
10 June	(Soviet Union) R-5A Pobeda		(Soviet Union) Chelkar		(Soviet Union) RVSN	
10 June		RVSN	Suborbital	Missile test	10 June	Successful
10 June	Apogee: 500 kilometres (310 mi)					
11 June; 06:30	(United States) SM-65D Atlas		(United States) Cape Canaveral LC-11		(United States) US Air Force	
11 June; 06:30		US Air Force	Suborbital	Missile test	11 June	Successful
11 June; 06:30	Apogee: 1,800 kilometres (1,100 mi)					
13 June	(France) Véronique		(France) Hammaguira Blandine		(France) CASDN	
13 June		CNRS	Suborbital	Aeronomy	13 June	Successful
13 June	Apogee: 176 kilometres (109 mi)					
15 June; 02:43	(Soviet Union) (East Germany) R-2A		(Soviet Union) Kapustin Yar		(Soviet Union) AN	
15 June; 02:43		AN	Suborbital	Aeronomy	15 June	Successful
15 June; 02:43	Apogee: 200 kilometres (120 mi)					
15 June; 15:45	(United States) Aerobee-150 (Hi)		(United States) White Sands		(United States) NRL	
15 June; 15:45			Suborbital	Aeronomy	15 June	Successful
15 June; 15:45	Apogee: 224 kilometres (139 mi)					
15 June; 22:56	(United States) Aerobee-300		(Canada) Churchill		(United States) NASA	
15 June; 22:56		UMI	Suborbital	Ionospheric	15 June	Successful
15 June; 22:56	Apogee: 321 kilometres (199 mi)					
16 June; 05:29	(United States) Nike-Cajun		(United States) Wallops Island		(United States) NASA	
16 June; 05:29		NASA	Suborbital	Aeronomy	16 June	Launch failure
16 June; 05:29	Apogee: 10 kilometres (6.2 mi)					
16 June; 12:04	(United Kingdom) Skylark-2		(Australia) Woomera LA-2		(United Kingdom) RAE	
16 June; 12:04		QUB	Suborbital	Aeronomy	16 June	Successful
16 June; 12:04	Apogee: 129 kilometres (80 mi)					
16 June	(France) Véronique		(France) Hammaguira Blandine		(France) CASDN	
16 June		CNRS	Suborbital	Aeronomy	16 June	Successful
16 June	Apogee: 180 kilometres (110 mi)					
18 June	(France) Véronique		(France) Hammaguira Blandine		(France) CASDN	
18 June		CNRS	Suborbital	Aeronomy	18 June	Successful
18 June	Apogee: 152 kilometres (94 mi)					
21 June; 10:05	(United Kingdom) Black Knight 201		(Australia) Woomera LA-5A		(United Kingdom) RAE	
21 June; 10:05		RAE	Suborbital	RV test	21 June	Successful
21 June; 10:05	Gaslight test, apogee: 484 kilometres (301 mi)					
21 June	(United States) Kiva-Hopi		(United States) Point Mugu		(United States) US Air Force	
21 June	(United States) Phoenix 1	US Air Force	Suborbital	Test flight	21 June	Successful
21 June	Apogee: 300 kilometres (190 mi)					
22 June; 14:49	(United States) SM-65D Atlas		(United States) Cape Canaveral LC-14		(United States) US Air Force	
22 June; 14:49		US Air Force	Suborbital	Missile test	22 June	Successful
22 June; 14:49	Apogee: 1,800 kilometres (1,100 mi)					
22 June; 23:26	(United States) PGM-17 Thor DM-18A		(United States) Vandenberg LC-75-2-7		(United Kingdom) Royal Air Force	
22 June; 23:26		Royal Air Force	Suborbital	Missile test	22 June	Successful
22 June; 23:26	Apogee: 520 kilometres (320 mi)					
22 June	(United States) Nike-Zeus		(United States) White Sands LC-38		(United States) US Army	
22 June		US Army	Suborbital	Test flight	22 June	Launch failure
22 June	(France) Véronique		(France) Hammaguira Blandine		(France) CASDN	
22 June		CNRS	Suborbital	Aeronomy	22 June	Launch failure
22 June	Apogee: 60 kilometres (37 mi)					
23 June; 02:22	(United States) UGM-27 Polaris A1		(United States) USNS Observation Island, ETR		(United States) US Navy	
23 June; 02:22		US Navy	Suborbital	Missile test	23 June	Successful
23 June; 02:22	Apogee: 500 kilometres (310 mi)					
23 June; 23:00	(Soviet Union) (East Germany) R-2A		(Soviet Union) Kapustin Yar		(Soviet Union) RVSN	
23 June; 23:00		RVSN	Suborbital	Ionospheric	23 June	Successful
23 June; 23:00	Apogee: 200 kilometres (120 mi)					
23 June; 05:00	(Soviet Union) R-11A Zemlya		(Soviet Union) Kapustin Yar		(Soviet Union) AN	
23 June; 05:00		AN	Suborbital	Aeronomy	23 June	Successful
23 June; 05:00	Apogee: 200 kilometres (120 mi)					
23 June; 05:52	(United States) UGM-27 Polaris A1		(United States) Cape Canaveral LC-25B		(United States) US Navy	
23 June; 05:52		US Navy	Suborbital	Missile test	23 June	Successful
23 June; 05:52	Apogee: 500 kilometres (310 mi)					
24 June; 06:25	(United States) Aerobee-150A		(United States) Wallops Island		(United States) NASA	
24 June; 06:25		NASA	Suborbital	UV Astronomy	24 June	Successful
24 June; 06:25	Apogee: 211 kilometres (131 mi)					
24 June	(Soviet Union) R-12 Dvina		(Soviet Union) Kapustin Yar		(Soviet Union) RVSN	
24 June		RVSN	Suborbital	Missile test	24 June	Successful
24 June	Apogee: 402 kilometres (250 mi)					
24 June	(United States) HGM-25A Titan I		(United States) Cape Canaveral LC-15		(United States) US Air Force	
24 June		US Air Force	Suborbital	RV test	24 June	Successful
24 June	Apogee: 1,000 kilometres (620 mi)					
26 June; 06:17	(United States) Trailblazer 1		(United States) Wallops Island		(United States) NASA	
26 June; 06:17		NASA	Suborbital	RV test	26 June	Successful
26 June; 06:17	Apogee: 294 kilometres (183 mi)					
27 June; 13:15	(United States) Aerobee-150 (Hi)		(United States) White Sands LC-35		(United States) NRL	
27 June; 13:15			Suborbital	Aeronomy	27 June	Successful
27 June; 13:15	Apogee: 222 kilometres (138 mi)					
27 June; 19:10	(United States) Nike-Asp		(United States) Eglin		(United States) US Air Force	
27 June; 19:10		US Air Force	Suborbital	Ionospheric	27 June	Launch failure
27 June; 19:10	Apogee: 170 kilometres (110 mi)					
27 June	(United States) Nike-Asp		(United States) Cape Canaveral		(United States) US Air Force	
27 June		US Air Force	Suborbital	Ionospheric	27 June	Successful
27 June	Apogee: 150 kilometres (93 mi)					
28 June; 02:30	(United States) SM-65D Atlas		(United States) Cape Canaveral LC-12		(United States) US Air Force	
28 June; 02:30		US Air Force	Suborbital	Missile test	28 June	Successful
28 June; 02:30	Apogee: 1,800 kilometres (1,100 mi)					
28 June; 05:10	(United States) Nike-Asp		(United States) Eglin		(United States) US Air Force	
28 June; 05:10		US Air Force	Suborbital	Ionospheric	28 June	Successful
28 June; 05:10	Apogee: 195 kilometres (121 mi)					
29 June	(Soviet Union) R-12 Dvina		(Soviet Union) Kapustin Yar		(Soviet Union) RVSN	
29 June		RVSN	Suborbital	Missile test	29 June	Successful
29 June	Apogee: 402 kilometres (250 mi)					
30 June; 16:00	(United States) MGM-31 Pershing I		(United States) Cape Canaveral LC-30A		(United States) US Army	
30 June; 16:00		US Army	Suborbital	Missile test	30 June	Successful
30 June; 16:00	Apogee: 250 kilometres (160 mi)					
30 June; 20:25	(United States) Javelin		(United States) Wallops Island		(United States) NASA	
30 June; 20:25		NASA	Suborbital	Magnetospheric	30 June	Launch failure
30 June; 20:25	Apogee: 65 kilometres (40 mi)					
June	(Soviet Union) R-12 Dvina		(Soviet Union) Kapustin Yar		(Soviet Union) RVSN	
June		RVSN	Suborbital	Missile test	June	Successful
June	Apogee: 402 kilometres (250 mi)					
June	(Soviet Union) R-12 Dvina		(Soviet Union) Kapustin Yar		(Soviet Union) RVSN	
June		RVSN	Suborbital	Missile test	June	Successful
June	Apogee: 402 kilometres (250 mi)					
June	(Soviet Union) R-14 Chusovaya		(Soviet Union) Kapustin Yar		(Soviet Union) RVSN	
June		RVSN	Suborbital	Missile test	June	Successful
June	Apogee: 675 kilometres (419 mi)					

- ← Jan
- Feb
- Mar
- Apr
- May
- Jun
- Jul
- Aug
- Sep
- Oct
- Nov
- Dec →
