= Discoverer 9 =

Reconnaissance satellite

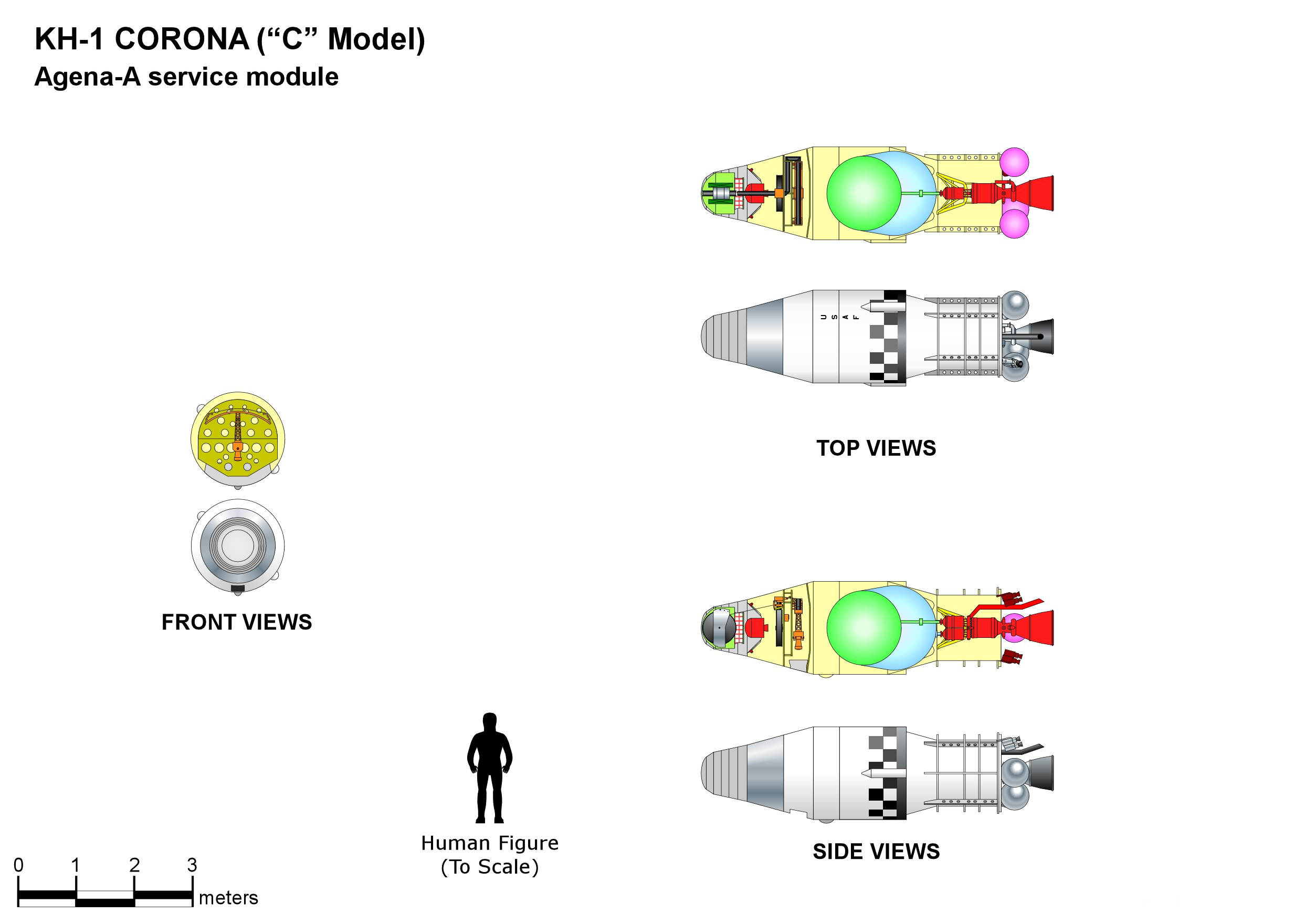
- Mission type: Optical reconnaissance
- Operator: US Air Force / NRO
- Harvard designation: 1960-F01
- SATCAT no.: F00083

Spacecraft properties
- Spacecraft type: CORONA KH-1
- Bus: Agena-A
- Manufacturer: Lockheed

Start of mission
- Launch date: 4 Feb 1960 18:51:45 GMT
- Rocket: Thor DM-21 Agena-A (Thor 218)
- Launch site: Vandenberg LC 75-3-4

Discoverer 9, also known as Corona 9006, was an American optical reconnaissance satellite launched on 4 Feb 1960 at 18:51:45 GMT, the sixth of ten operational flights of the Corona KH-1 spy satellite series, and the first of them to be equipped with a new, vacuum-proof, polyester-based film. The satellite was not successfully orbited.

== Background ==
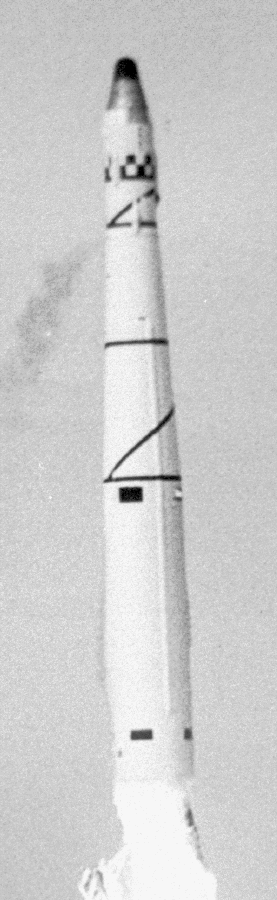
Thor Agena A with Discoverer 9, 4 February 1960

"Discoverer" was the civilian designation and cover for the Corona satellite photo-reconnaissance series of satellites managed by the Advanced Research Projects Agency of the Department of Defense and the U.S. Air Force. The primary goal of the satellites was to replace the U-2 spyplane in surveilling the Sino-Soviet Bloc, determining the disposition and speed of production of Soviet missiles and long-range bombers assess. The Corona program was also used to produce maps and charts for the Department of Defense and other US government mapping programs.

The first series of Corona satellites were the Keyhole 1 (KH-1) satellites based on the Agena-A upper stage, which not only offered housing but whose engine provided attitude control in orbit. The KH-1 payload included the C (for Corona) single, vertical-looking, panoramic camera that scanned back and forth, exposing its film at a right angle to the line of flight. The camera, built by Fairchild Camera and Instrument with a f/5.0 aperture and 61 centimetres (24 in) focal length, had a ground resolution of 12.9 metres (42 ft). Film was returned from orbit by a single General Electric Satellite Return Vehicle (SRV) constructed by General Electric. The SRV was equipped with an onboard small solid-fuel retro motor to deorbit at the end of the mission. Recovery of the capsule was done in mid-air by a specially equipped aircraft.

Discoverer began with a series of three test flights whose satellites carried no cameras, all launched in the first half of 1959. There followed five operational Discoverer satellites, all of them partial or complete failures. Following the subsystem issues which prevented the recovery of the film capsules on Discoverer 7 and Discoverer 8 in November 1959, flight tests were suspended for several months of intensive corrective engineering.

== Spacecraft ==
The battery-powered Discoverer 9 was of similar configuration to prior Discoverer satellites, being housed in an Agena-A stage and composed of a satellite bus and SRV equipped with the C camera.

Only a quarter load (10 pounds (4.5 kg) of film was carried on Discoverer 9 to accommodate the first Transit on Discoverer (TOD) payload, designed to test orbital tracking techniques for the Transit navigational satellite program.

== Mission ==
Launched 4 Feb 1960 at 18:51:45 GMT from Vandenberg LC 75-3-4 by a Thor DM-21 Agena-A rocket, the Thor first stage shut down 19 seconds early as did the Agena second stage, the latter being caused by a faulty helium disconnect from the Agena at launch. Either of these issues would have left Discoverer 9 with insufficient velocity to reach orbit, and the satellite crashed into the Pacific 400 miles (640 km) downrange.

== Legacy ==
CORONA achieved its first fully successful flight with the mission of Discoverer 14, launched on August 18, 1960. The program ultimately comprised 145 flights in eight satellite series, the last mission launching on 25 May 1972. CORONA was declassified in 1995, and a formal acknowledgement of the existence of US reconnaissance programs, past and present, was issued in September 1996.
