= Discoverer 10 =

Reconnaissance satellite

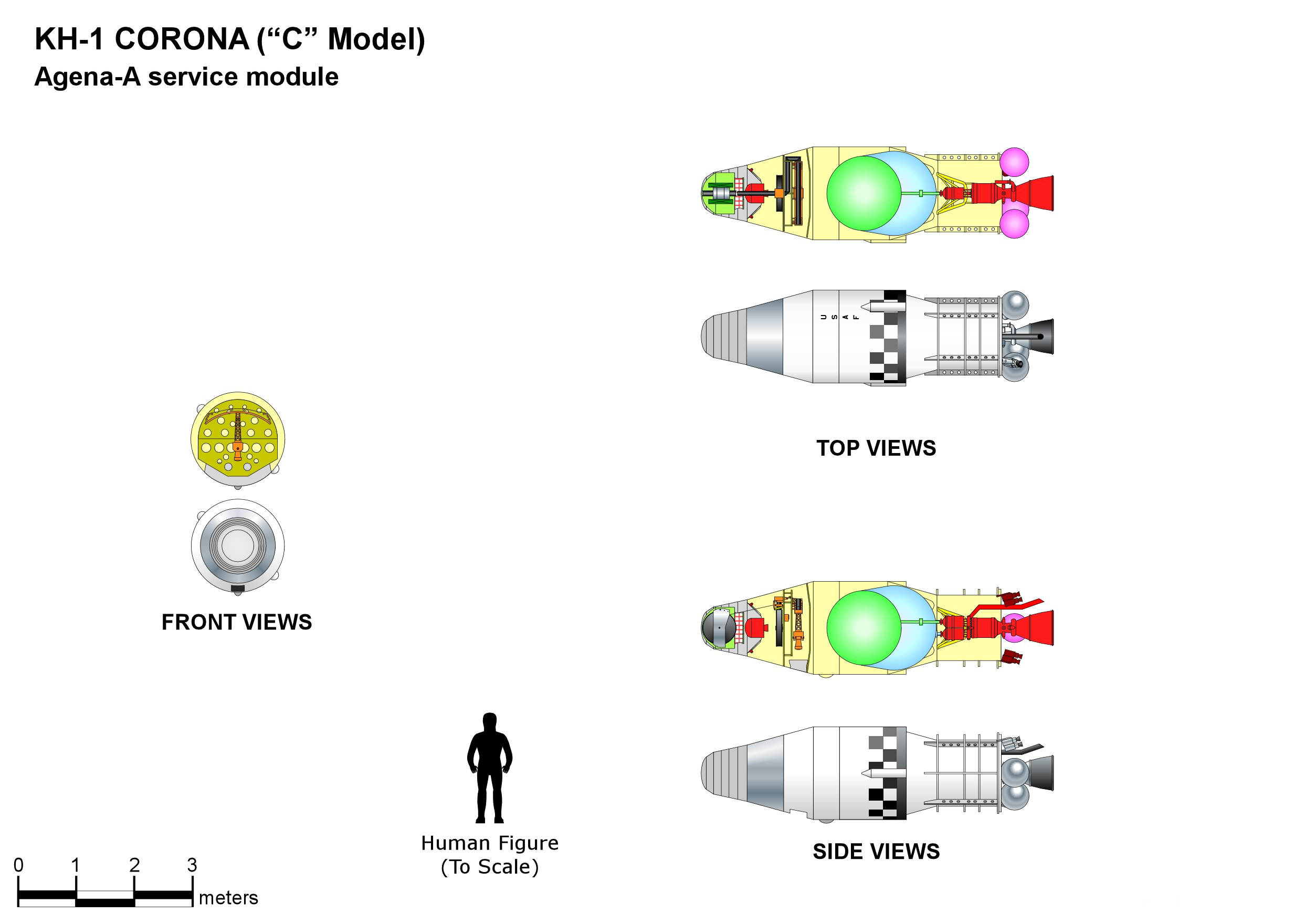
- Mission type: Optical reconnaissance
- Operator: US Air Force / NRO
- Harvard designation: 1960-F02
- SATCAT no.: F00088

Spacecraft properties
- Spacecraft type: CORONA KH-1
- Bus: Agena-A
- Manufacturer: Lockheed

Start of mission
- Launch date: 19 Feb 1960 20:15:14 GMT
- Rocket: Thor DM-21 Agena-A (Thor 223)
- Launch site: Vandenberg LC 75-3-5

Discoverer 10, also known as Corona 9007, was an American optical reconnaissance satellite launched on 19 Feb 1960 at 20:15:14 GMT, the seventh of ten operational flights of the Corona KH-1 spy satellite series.

== Background ==
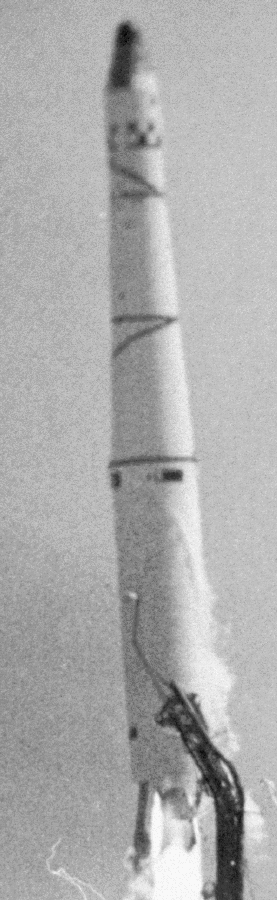
Thor Agena A with Discoverer 10, 19 February 1960

"Discoverer" was the civilian designation and cover for the Corona satellite photo-reconnaissance series of satellites managed by the Advanced Research Projects Agency of the Department of Defense and the U.S. Air Force. The primary goal of the satellites was to replace the U-2 spyplane in surveilling the Sino-Soviet Bloc, determining the disposition and speed of production of Soviet missiles and long-range bombers assess. The Corona program was also used to produce maps and charts for the Department of Defense and other US government mapping programs.

The first series of Corona satellites were the Keyhole 1 (KH-1) satellites based on the Agena-A upper stage, which not only offered housing but whose engine provided attitude control in orbit. The KH-1 payload included the C (for Corona) single, vertical-looking, panoramic camera that scanned back and forth, exposing its film at a right angle to the line of flight. The camera, built by Fairchild Camera and Instrument with a f/5.0 aperture and 61 centimetres (24 in) focal length, had a ground resolution of 12.9 metres (42 ft). Film was returned from orbit by a single General Electric Satellite Return Vehicle (SRV) constructed by General Electric. The SRV was equipped with an onboard small solid-fuel retro motor to deorbit at the end of the mission. Recovery of the capsule was done in mid-air by a specially equipped aircraft.

Discoverer began with a series of three test flights whose satellites carried no cameras, all launched in the first half of 1959. There followed five operational Discoverer satellites, all of them partial or complete failures. Following the subsystem issues which prevented the recovery of the film capsules on Discoverer 7 and Discoverer 8 in November 1959, flight tests were suspended for several months of intensive corrective engineering.

After this delay, Discoverer 9 was launched 4 Feb 1960, but it failed to reach orbit.

== Spacecraft ==
The battery-powered Discoverer 10 was of similar configuration to prior Discoverer satellites, being housed in an Agena-A stage and composed of a satellite bus and SRV equipped with the C camera. The satellite also carried a Transit on Discoverer (TOD) payload designed to test orbital tracking techniques for the Transit navigational satellite program.

== Mission ==
Launched 19 Feb 1960 at 20:15:14 GMT from Vandenberg LC 75-3-5 by a Thor DM-21 Agena-A rocket, the Thor first stage began wobbling soon after launch, and the booster was destroyed by range safety officers, causing pieces of the vehicle to rain down on the base. The shattered camera was quickly retrieved to prevent a breach of security.

== Legacy ==
Having sustained ten failures in a row (partial or complete), morale among the program engineers reached a nadir, and there was discussion of canceling CORONA. Richard Bissell, head of the program, and USAF Colonel Paul Worthman, liaison between the CIA and Air Force on the program, worked to raise spirits and quash rumors of cancellation.

CORONA continued, achieving its first fully successful flight with the mission of Discoverer 14, launched on August 18, 1960. The program ultimately comprised 145 flights in eight satellite series, the last mission launching on 25 May 1972. CORONA was declassified in 1995, and a formal acknowledgement of the existence of US reconnaissance programs, past and present, was issued in September 1996.
