= Discoverer 11 =

Reconnaissance satellite

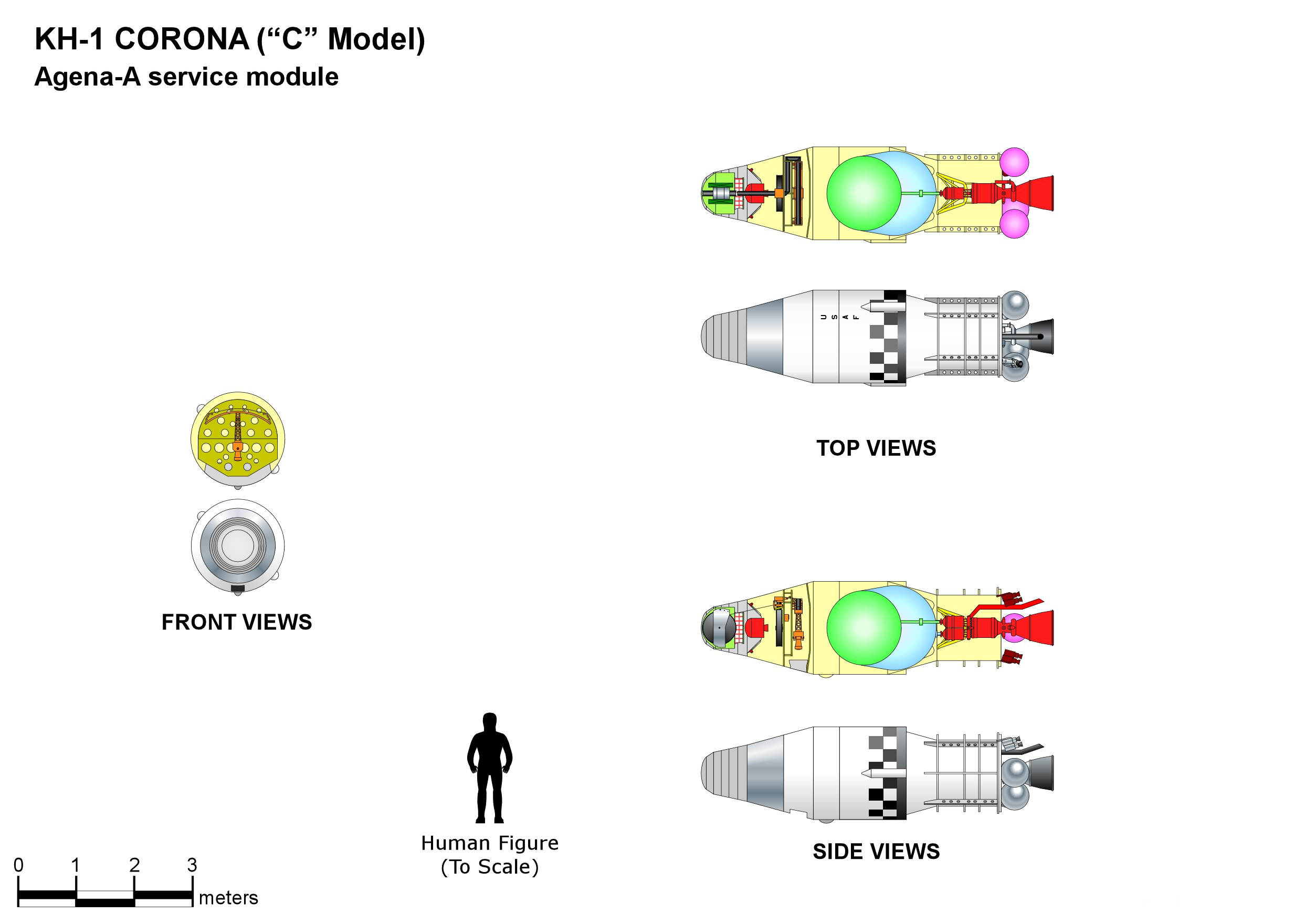
- Mission type: Optical reconnaissance
- Operator: US Air Force / NRO
- Harvard designation: 1960 DEL
- COSPAR ID: 1960-004A
- SATCAT no.: S00032
- Mission duration: 1 day

Spacecraft properties
- Spacecraft type: CORONA KH-1
- Bus: Agena-A
- Manufacturer: Lockheed
- Launch mass: 786 kilograms (1,733 lb)

Start of mission
- Launch date: 15 Apr 1960 20:30:37 GMT
- Rocket: Thor DM-21 Agena-A (Thor 234)
- Launch site: Vandenberg LC 75-3-5

End of mission
- Decay date: 26 Apr
- Landing date: 16 Apr (SRV)
- Landing site: Pacific Ocean (SRV)

Orbital parameters
- Reference system: Geocentric
- Regime: Low Earth
- Eccentricity: 0.03098
- Perigee altitude: 170 kilometres (110 mi)
- Apogee altitude: 589 kilometres (366 mi)
- Inclination: 80.100°
- Period: 92.16 minutes
- Epoch: 15 Apr 1960 20:24:00

Discoverer 11, also known as Corona 9008, was an American optical reconnaissance satellite launched on 15 Apr 1960 at 20:30:37 GMT. The eighth of ten operational flights of the Corona KH-1 spy satellite series, it successfully employed the first space-worthy camera film; however, Discoverer's film return capsule was lost during reentry on 16 Apr when the satellite's spin motors exploded.

== Background ==
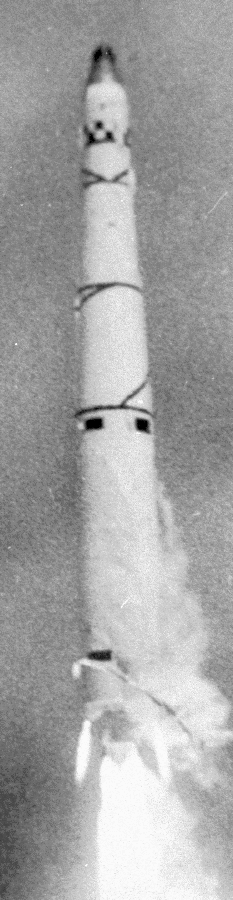
Thor Agena A with Discoverer 11, 15 April 1960

"Discoverer" was the civilian designation and cover for the Corona satellite photo-reconnaissance series of satellites managed by the Advanced Research Projects Agency of the Department of Defense and the U.S. Air Force. The primary goal of the satellites was to replace the U-2 spyplane in surveilling the Sino-Soviet Bloc, determining the disposition and speed of production of Soviet missiles and long-range bombers assess. The Corona program was also used to produce maps and charts for the Department of Defense and other US government mapping programs.

The first series of Corona satellites were the Keyhole 1 (KH-1) satellites based on the Agena-A upper stage, which not only offered housing but whose engine provided attitude control in orbit. The KH-1 payload included the C (for Corona) single, vertical-looking, panoramic camera that scanned back and forth, exposing its film at a right angle to the line of flight. The camera, built by Fairchild Camera and Instrument with a f/5.0 aperture and 61 centimetres (24 in) focal length, had a ground resolution of 12.9 metres (42 ft). Film was returned from orbit by a single General Electric Satellite Return Vehicle (SRV) constructed by General Electric. The SRV was equipped with an onboard small solid-fuel retro motor to deorbit at the end of the mission. Recovery of the capsule was done in mid-air by a specially equipped aircraft.

The Discoverer program began with a series of three test flights whose satellites carried no cameras, all launched in the first half of 1959. There followed five operational Discoverer satellites, all of them partial or complete failures. Following the subsystem issues which prevented the recovery of the film capsules on Discoverer 7 and Discoverer 8 in November 1959, flight tests were suspended for several months of intensive corrective engineering. Discoverer 9, launched 4 Feb 1960, failed to reach orbit, and Discoverer 10, launched just two weeks later on 19 Feb 1960, did not even survive to first stage burnout and had to be destroyed by range safety officers.

== Spacecraft ==
Of the three prior Discoverer satellites that had reached orbit, all of their cameras failed when the film snapped during loading. Ground tests determined that the acetate-based film became brittle in the vacuum of space, something that had not been discovered even in high altitude, low pressure testing. The Eastman Kodak Company was tasked with creating a more resilient replacement. Kodak developed the a technique of coating a high-resolution emulsion on a type of polyester from DuPont. Not only was the resulting polyester-based film resistant to vacuum brittling, it weighed half as much as the prior acetate-based film. This film was first utilized on Discoverer 11. The satellite carried 7.3 kilograms (16 lb) of the film, much less than the 18.2 kilograms (40 lb) carrying capacity of the satellite.

The battery-powered satellite was of similar configuration to prior Discoverers, being housed in an Agena-A stage and composed of a satellite bus and SRV equipped with the C camera. It massed 781 kilograms (1,722 lb) The satellite also carried a Transit on Discoverer (TOD) payload designed to test orbital tracking techniques for the Transit navigational satellite program.

== Mission ==
Launched 15 Apr 1960 at 20:24:00 GMT from Vandenberg LC 75-3-5 by a Thor DM-21 Agena-A rocket, Discoverer 11 was successfully placed into orbit. Moreover, it was the first Discoverer mission on which the film did not snap, proving the new Kodachrome product. However, the rockets designed to spin the Discoverer for stabilization apparently exploded on reentry, and the film capsule could not be recovered.

== Legacy ==
The loss of three consecutive Discoverer satellites resulted in another suspension of launches until the systemic problems could be addressed. It was decided to follow up Discoverer 11 with a test satellite equipped with a comprehensive diagnostics (as well as a new spin motor and de-spin system) so that, in the event of failure, more lessons might be learned. Though Discoverer 12 was lost during launch, the following test flight, Discoverer 13, was a complete success and paved the way for the first fully successful flight, Discoverer 14, launched on August 18, 1960. The program ultimately comprised 145 flights in eight satellite series, the last mission launching on 25 May 1972. CORONA was declassified in 1995, and a formal acknowledgement of the existence of US reconnaissance programs, past and present, was issued in September 1996.
