= Discoverer 15 =

Reconnaissance satellite of the United States Air Force

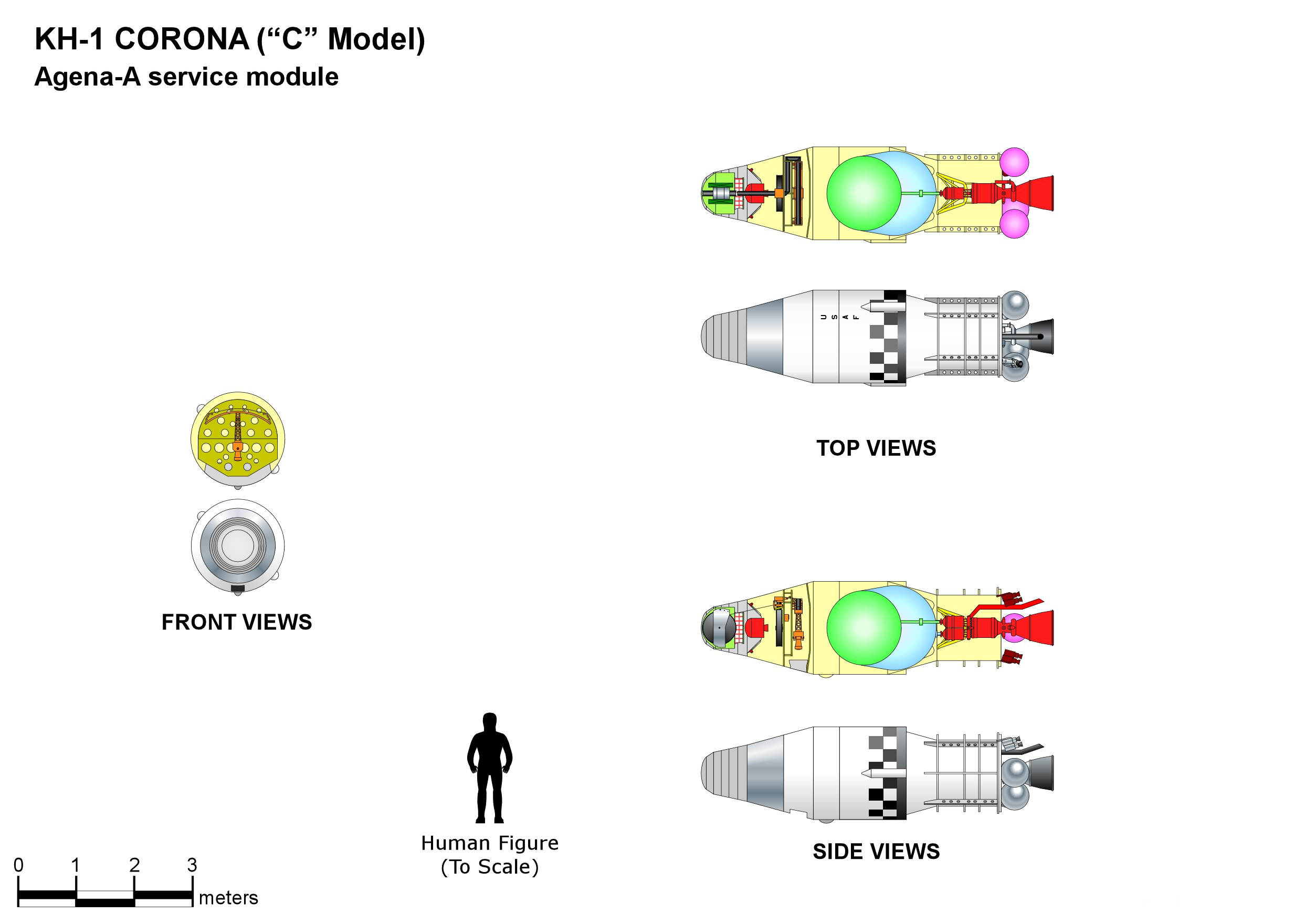
- Mission type: Optical reconnaissance
- Operator: US Air Force / NRO
- Harvard designation: 1960 MU
- COSPAR ID: 1960-012A
- SATCAT no.: S00057
- Mission duration: 2 days

Spacecraft properties
- Spacecraft type: CORONA KH-1
- Bus: Agena-A
- Manufacturer: Lockheed
- Launch mass: 810 kilograms (1,790 lb) after orbit insertion

Start of mission
- Launch date: 13 September 1960 22:13:39 GMT
- Rocket: Thor DM-21 Agena-A (Thor 246)
- Launch site: Vandenberg LC 75-3-5

End of mission
- Decay date: 18 October 1960
- Landing date: 15 September 1960
- Landing site: Pacific Ocean (SRV)

Orbital parameters
- Reference system: Geocentric
- Regime: Low Earth
- Eccentricity: 0.04094
- Perigee altitude: 199 kilometers (124 mi)
- Apogee altitude: 761 kilometers (473 mi)
- Inclination: 80.900°
- Period: 94.23 minutes
- Epoch: 13 September 1960 22:19:00

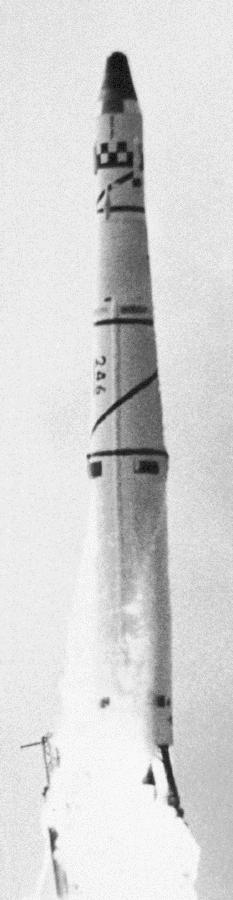
Thor Agena-A with Discoverer 15 on 13 September 1960

Discoverer 15, also known as Corona 9010, was a spy satellite used in the Corona program managed by Advanced Research Projects Agency (ARPA) of the Department of Defense and the United States Air Force. Launched on 13 September 1960, the satellite took reconnaissance photos of the Soviet Union. However, its recoverable film capsule was lost in the Pacific Ocean after reentry outside the recovery zone on 15 September.

== Background ==
"Discoverer" was the civilian designation and cover for the Corona satellite photo-reconnaissance series of satellites managed by the Advanced Research Projects Agency of the Department of Defense and the U.S. Air Force. The primary goal of the satellites was to replace the U-2 spyplane in surveilling the Sino-Soviet Bloc, determining the disposition and speed of production of Soviet missiles and long-range bombers assess. The Corona program was also used to produce maps and charts for the Department of Defense and other US government mapping programs.

The first series of Corona satellites were the Keyhole 1 (KH-1) satellites based on the Agena-A upper stage, which not only offered housing but whose engine provided attitude control in orbit. The KH-1 payload included the C (for Corona) single, vertical-looking, panoramic camera that scanned back and forth, exposing its film at a right angle to the line of flight. The camera, built by Fairchild Camera and Instrument with a f/5.0 aperture and 61 centimetres (24 in) focal length, had a ground resolution of 12.9 metres (42 ft). Film was returned from orbit by a single General Electric Satellite Return Vehicle (SRV) constructed by General Electric. The SRV was equipped with an onboard small solid-fuel retro motor to deorbit at the end of the mission. Recovery of the capsule was done in mid-air by a specially equipped aircraft.

The Discoverer program began with a series of three test flights whose satellites carried no cameras, all launched in the first half of 1959. There followed eight operational Discoverer satellites, all of them partial or complete failures, though Discoverer 11, launched 15 April 1960, carried a new vacuum-resistant film and was the first mission on which the onboard camera worked properly. Discoverer 11 failed on reentry, caused by the explosion of its spin motor. Though Discoverer 12, a diagnostic flight to determine the causes of the various issues plaguing the program, was lost shortly after launch on 29 June 1960, the identical Discoverer 13 functioned perfectly during its 10–11 August mission. Discoverer 14, launched 18 August, marked the first completely successful operational Discoverer mission.

== Spacecraft ==
The battery-powered satellite was of similar configuration to prior Discoverers, being housed in an Agena-A stage and composed of a satellite bus and SRV equipped with camera. Discoverer 15 would be the last satellite to use the original C camera, Discoverer 16 and later flights being installed with the improved C' model. The satellite massed 810 kilograms (1,790 lb)

== Mission ==
Launched into a polar orbit by a Thor-Agena A booster on 13 September 1960 at 22:13:39 GMT from Vandenberg LC 75-3-5 by a Thor DM-21 Agena-A rocket, Discover 15's camera functioned properly. However, the recovery vehicle re-entered at the wrong pitch attitude, and the capsule landed outside its recovery zone in the Pacific Ocean. This landing inaccuracy caused by the timing and angle of retrofire had been a perennial problem all of the prior (successfully deorbiting) Discoverers save for Discoverer 14. The Discoverer 15 capsule was located, but it sank before a recovery ship could reach it.

Discoverer 15's main body reentered Earth's atmosphere on 18 September 1960.

== Results and legacy ==
The Corona program went on to comprise 145 flights in eight satellite series, the last mission launching on 25 May 1972. CORONA was declassified in 1995, and a formal acknowledgement of the existence of US reconnaissance programs, past and present, was issued in September 1996.
