= Discoverer 7 =

Reconnaissance satellite

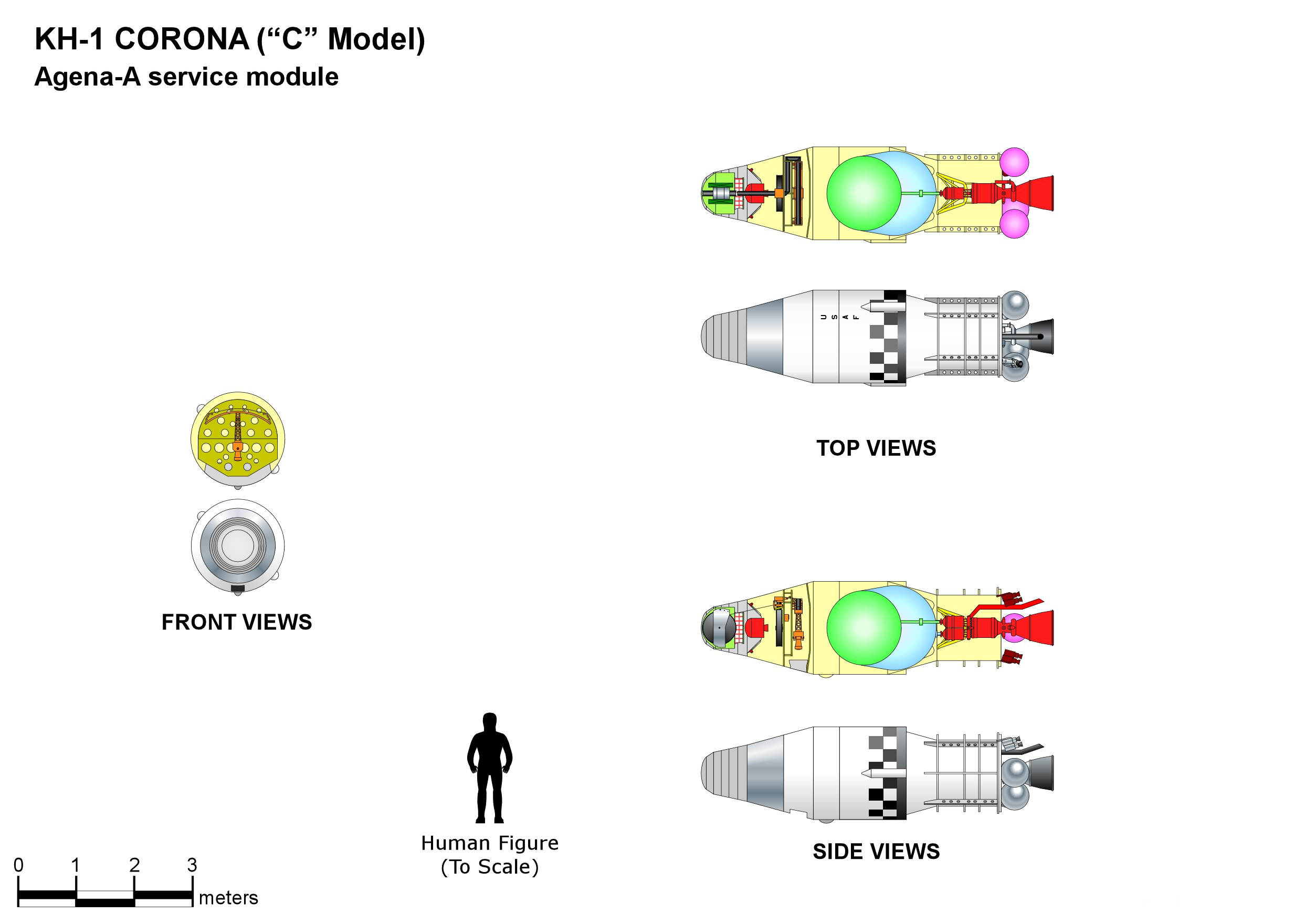
- Mission type: Optical reconnaissance
- Operator: US Air Force / NRO
- Harvard designation: 1959 KAP
- COSPAR ID: 1959-010A
- SATCAT no.: S00024
- Mission duration: 1 day

Spacecraft properties
- Spacecraft type: CORONA KH-1
- Bus: Agena-A
- Manufacturer: Lockheed
- Launch mass: 920 kilograms (2,030 lb) after orbit insertion

Start of mission
- Launch date: 7 November 1959 20:28:41 GMT
- Rocket: Thor DM-21 Agena-A (Thor 206)
- Launch site: Vandenberg LC 75-3-4

End of mission
- Decay date: 26 November 1959

Orbital parameters
- Reference system: Geocentric
- Regime: Low Earth
- Eccentricity: 0.04996
- Perigee altitude: 159 kilometers (99 mi)
- Apogee altitude: 847 kilometers (526 mi)
- Inclination: 81.640°
- Period: 94.70 minutes
- Epoch: 7 November 1959

Discoverer 7, also known as Corona 9004, was an American optical reconnaissance satellite launched on 7 November 1959 at 20:28:41 GMT, the fourth of ten operational flights of the Corona KH-1 spy satellite series. Though the satellite was orbited successfully, its film capsule failed to separate from the main satellite.

== Background ==
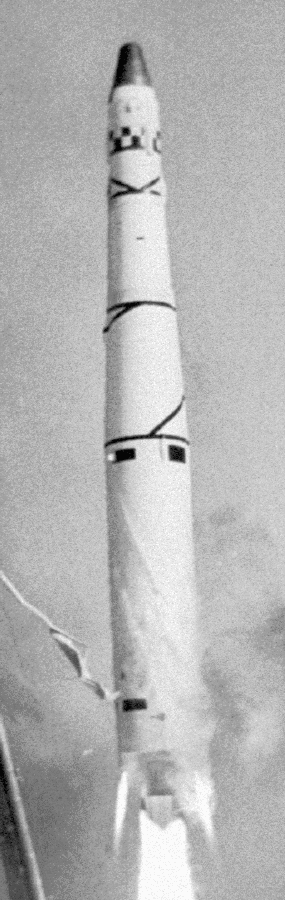
Thor Agena A with Discoverer 7, 7 November 1959

"Discoverer" was the civilian designation and cover for the Corona satellite photo-reconnaissance series of satellites managed by the Advanced Research Projects Agency of the Department of Defense and the U.S. Air Force. The primary goal of the satellites was to replace the U-2 spyplane in surveilling the Sino-Soviet Bloc, determining the disposition and speed of production of Soviet missiles and long-range bombers assess. The Corona program was also used to produce maps and charts for the Department of Defense and other US government mapping programs.

The first series of Corona satellites were the Keyhole 1 (KH-1) satellites based on the Agena-A upper stage, which not only offered housing but whose engine provided attitude control in orbit. The KH-1 payload included the C (for Corona) single, vertical-looking, panoramic camera that scanned back and forth, exposing its film at a right angle to the line of flight. The camera, built by Fairchild Camera and Instrument with a f/5.0 aperture and 61 centimetres (24 in) focal length, had a ground resolution of 12.9 metres (42 ft). Film was returned from orbit by a single General Electric Satellite Return Vehicle (SRV) constructed by General Electric. The SRV was equipped with an onboard small solid-fuel retro motor to deorbit at the end of the mission. Recovery of the capsule was done in mid-air by a specially equipped aircraft.

Discoverer 7 was preceded by three operational missions and three test flights whose satellites carried no cameras, all launched in 1959.

== Spacecraft ==
The battery-powered Discoverer 7 was a cylindrical satellite 1.5 metres (4 ft 11 in) in diameter, 5.85 metres (19.2 ft) long and had a mass after second stage separation, including propellants, of roughly 3,850 kilograms (8,490 lb). After orbital insertion, the satellite and SRV together massed 920 kilograms (2,030 lb). The capsule section of the reentry vehicle was 84 centimetres (33 in) in diameter and 69 centimetres (27 in) long. Like its operational predecessors, Discoverers 4–6, Discoverer 7 carried the C camera for its photosurveillance mission.

The capsule was designed to be recovered by a specially equipped aircraft during parachute descent, but was also designed to float to permit recovery from the ocean. The main spacecraft contained a telemetry transmitter and a tracking beacon.

== Mission ==
Discoverer 7 was launched on 7 November 1959 at 20:28:41 GMT from Vandenberg LC 75-3-4 into a 159 kilometres (99 mi) x 847 kilometres (526 mi) polar orbit by a Thor-Agena A booster. One day after launch, a command was sent to initiate SRV separation for deorbiting and recovery. However, the capsule failed to separate from its satellite bus. The satellite bus reentered on 26 November 1959.

== Legacy ==
CORONA achieved its first fully successful flight with the mission of Discoverer 14, launched on August 18, 1960. The program ultimately comprised 145 flights in eight satellite series, the last mission launching on 25 May 1972. CORONA was declassified in 1995, and a formal acknowledgement of the existence of US reconnaissance programs, past and present, was issued in September 1996.
