= Discoverer 8 =

Reconnaissance satellite

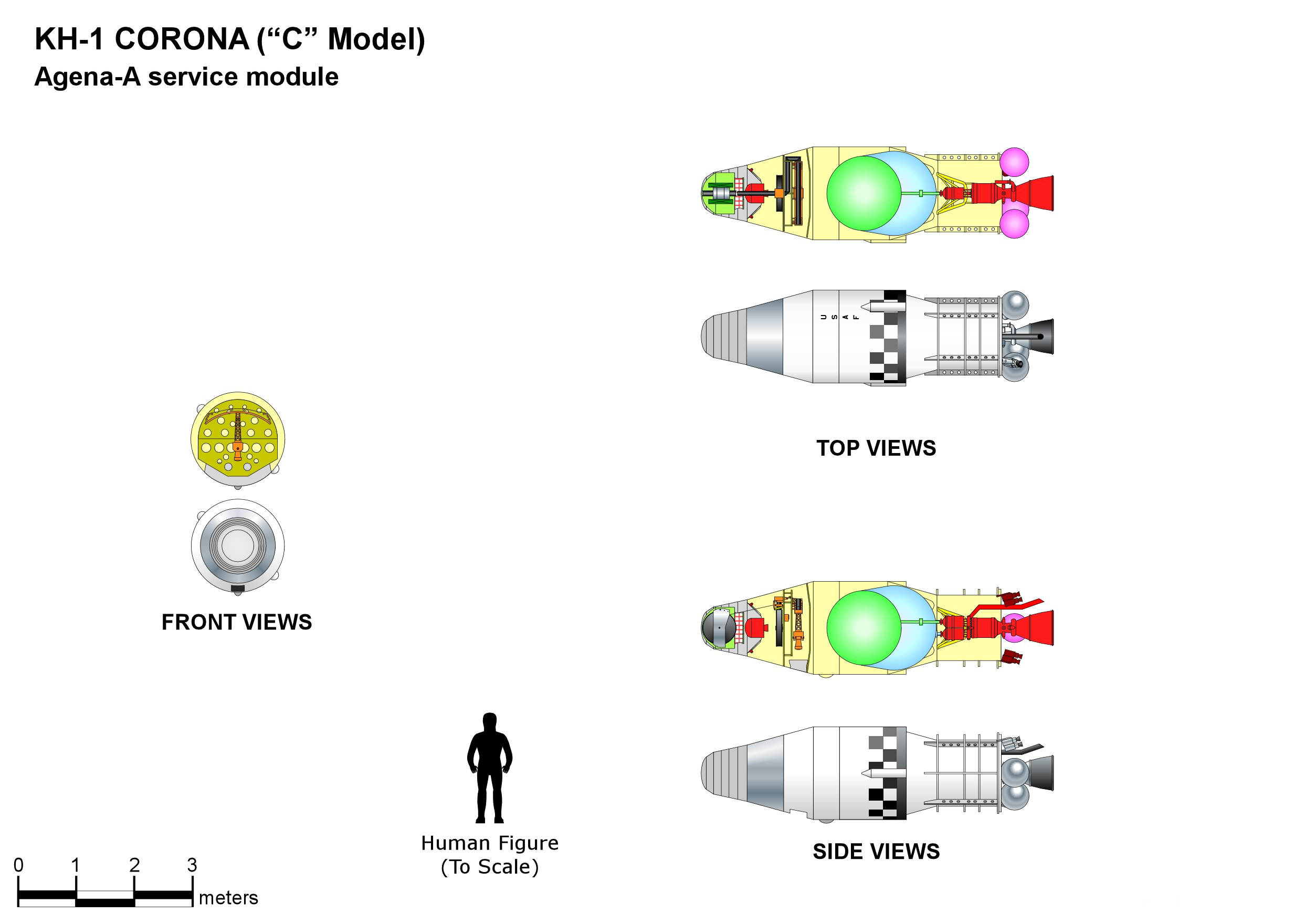
- Mission type: Optical reconnaissance
- Operator: US Air Force / NRO
- Harvard designation: 1959 LAM
- COSPAR ID: 1959-011A
- SATCAT no.: S00025
- Mission duration: 1 day

Spacecraft properties
- Spacecraft type: CORONA KH-1
- Bus: Agena-A
- Manufacturer: Lockheed
- Launch mass: 835 kilograms (1,841 lb) after orbit insertion

Start of mission
- Launch date: 20 November 1959 19:25:24 GMT
- Rocket: Thor DM-21 Agena-A (Thor 212)
- Launch site: Vandenberg LC 75-3-5

End of mission
- Decay date: 8 March 1960
- Landing date: 21 November 1959 (SRV)
- Landing site: Pacific Ocean (SRV)

Orbital parameters
- Reference system: Geocentric
- Regime: Low Earth
- Eccentricity: 0.10197
- Perigee altitude: 187 kilometers (116 mi)
- Apogee altitude: 1,679 kilometers (1,043 mi)
- Inclination: 80.650°
- Period: 103.70 minutes
- Epoch: 20 November 1959

Discoverer 8, also known as Corona 9005, was an American optical reconnaissance satellite launched on 20 November 1959 at 19:25:24 GMT, the fifth of ten operational flights of the Corona KH-1 spy satellite series. Overburn by the carrier rocket placed the satellite in a higher apogee, more eccentric orbit than planned, the camera failed to operate, and the film return capsule was lost on reentry after separation from the main satellite on 21 November.

== Background ==
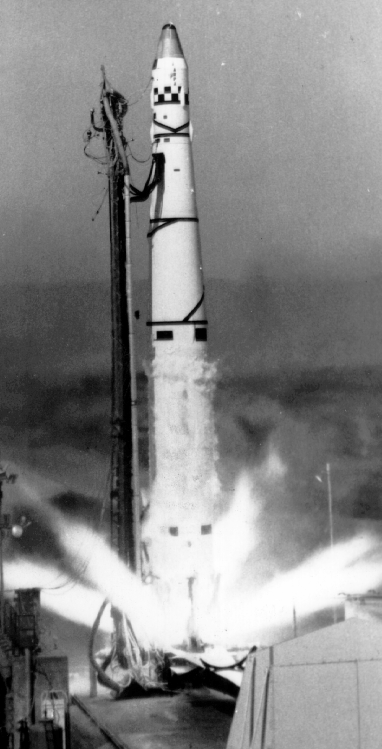
Thor Agena A with Discoverer 8, 20 November 1959

"Discoverer" was the civilian designation and cover for the Corona satellite photo-reconnaissance series of satellites managed by the Advanced Research Projects Agency of the Department of Defense and the U.S. Air Force. The primary goal of the satellites was to replace the U-2 spyplane in surveilling the Sino-Soviet Bloc, determining the disposition and speed of production of Soviet missiles and long-range bombers assess. The Corona program was also used to produce maps and charts for the Department of Defense and other US government mapping programs.

The first series of Corona satellites were the Keyhole 1 (KH-1) satellites based on the Agena-A upper stage, which not only offered housing but whose engine provided attitude control in orbit. The KH-1 payload included the C (for Corona) single, vertical-looking, panoramic camera that scanned back and forth, exposing its film at a right angle to the line of flight. The camera, built by Fairchild Camera and Instrument with a f/5.0 aperture and 61 centimetres (24 in) focal length, had a ground resolution of 12.9 metres (42 ft). Film was returned from orbit by a single General Electric Satellite Return Vehicle (SRV) constructed by General Electric. The SRV was equipped with an onboard small solid-fuel retro motor to deorbit at the end of the mission. Recovery of the capsule was done in mid-air by a specially equipped aircraft.

Discoverer 8 was preceded by four operational missions, as well as three test flights whose satellites carried no cameras, all launched in 1959.

== Spacecraft ==
The battery-powered Discoverer 8 was a cylindrical satellite 1.5 metres (4 ft 11 in) in diameter, 5.85 metres (19.2 ft) long and had a mass after second stage separation, including propellants, of roughly 3,850 kilograms (8,490 lb). After orbital insertion, the satellite and SRV together massed 835 kilograms (1,841 lb). The capsule section of the reentry vehicle was 84 centimetres (33 in) in diameter and 69 centimetres (27 in) long. Like its operational predecessors, Discoverers 4–7, Discoverer 8 carried the C camera for its photosurveillance mission.

The capsule was designed to be recovered by a specially equipped aircraft during parachute descent, but was also designed to float to permit recovery from the ocean. The main spacecraft contained a telemetry transmitter and a tracking beacon.

== Mission ==
Discoverer 8 was launched on 20 November 1959 at 19:25:24 GMT from Vandenberg LC 75-3-5 into a 187 kilometres (116 mi) x 1,679 kilometres (1,043 mi) polar orbit by a Thor-Agena A booster. Overburn of the Agena caused the satellite to end up in a much more eccentric, higher apogee orbit than its predecessors. As had happened with Discoverers 5 and 6, the camera film snapped on its way from its supply container. Due to Discoverer 8's eccentric orbit, the onboard ejection timer was unable to properly determine time of SRV separation, and after 15 orbits, a manual command was given from the ground to separate the SRV from the satellite bus for deorbit and recovery, which occurred on 21 November at 21:20 GMT. Telemetry from the capsule was received by the telemetry ship, USNS PVT. Joe E. Mann (positioned between the tracking stations at Kaena Point, Hawaii and Kodiak, Alaska) until ionization blackout. This data suggested the capsule was off course, and the recovery fleet was diverted southward 200 nautical miles (370 km; 230 mi) to the expected landing place. The ships arrived in time to see Discoverer 8's capsule hit the water, its parachute undeployed. Later analysis determined that the ceramic reentry heat shield had failed to detach from the SRV, causing a faster than normal descent, in turn preventing the parachute from deploying.

The satellite bus reentered on 8 March 1960.

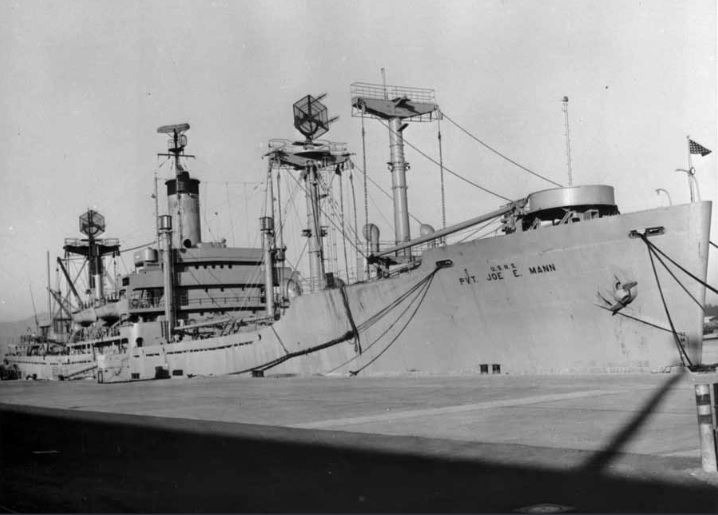
USNS PVT Joe E. Mann in 1960, supporting the Discoverer program.

== Legacy ==
CORONA achieved its first fully successful flight with the mission of Discoverer 14, launched on August 18, 1960. The program ultimately comprised 145 flights in eight satellite series, the last mission launching on 25 May 1972. CORONA was declassified in 1995, and a formal acknowledgement of the existence of US reconnaissance programs, past and present, was issued in September 1996.
