= Discoverer 14 =

American reconnaissance satellite

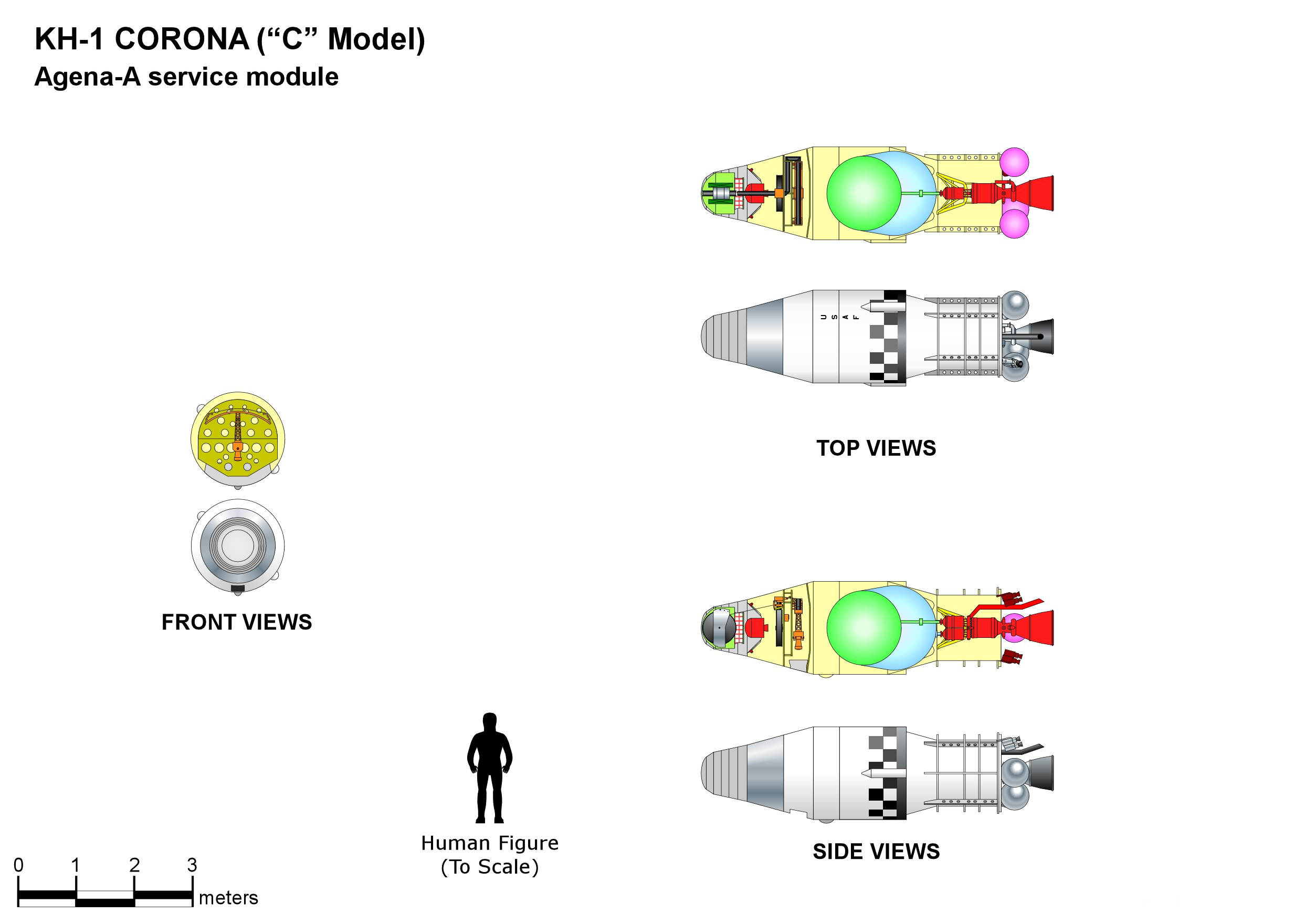
- Mission type: Optical reconnaissance
- Operator: US Air Force / NRO
- Harvard designation: 1960 KAP
- COSPAR ID: 1960-010A
- SATCAT no.: S00054
- Mission duration: 1 day

Spacecraft properties
- Spacecraft type: CORONA KH-1
- Bus: Agena-A
- Manufacturer: Lockheed
- Launch mass: 810 kilograms (1,790 lb) after orbit insertion

Start of mission
- Launch date: 18 August 1960 19:57:08 GMT
- Rocket: Thor DM-21 Agena-A (Thor 237)
- Launch site: Vandenberg LC 75-3-4

End of mission
- Decay date: 16 September 1960
- Landing date: 19 August 1960
- Landing site: Pacific Ocean (SRV)

Orbital parameters
- Reference system: Geocentric
- Regime: Low Earth
- Eccentricity: 0.04499
- Perigee altitude: 186 kilometers (116 mi)
- Apogee altitude: 805 kilometers (500 mi)
- Inclination: 79.650°
- Period: 94.55 minutes
- Epoch: 18 August 1960 19:55:00

Discoverer 14, also known as Corona 9009, was a spy satellite used in the Corona program managed by Advanced Research Projects Agency (ARPA) of the Department of Defense and the United States Air Force. On 19 August 1960, usable photographic film images of the Soviet Union taken by the satellite were recovered by a C-119 recovery aircraft. This was the first successful recovery of film from an orbiting satellite and the first mid-air recovery of an object returning from Earth orbit.

== Background ==
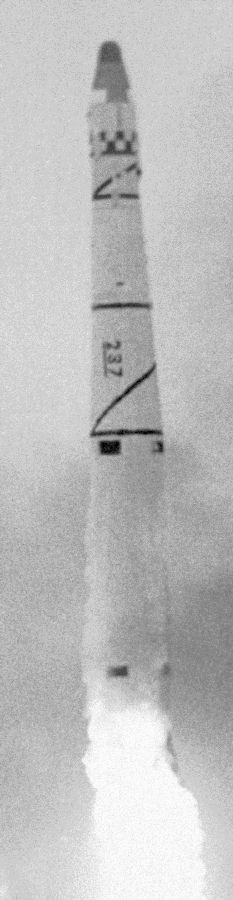
Thor Agena A with Discoverer 14

"Discoverer" was the civilian designation and cover for the Corona satellite photo-reconnaissance series of satellites managed by the Advanced Research Projects Agency of the Department of Defense and the U.S. Air Force. The primary goal of the satellites was to replace the U-2 spyplane in surveilling the Sino-Soviet Bloc, determining the disposition and speed of production of Soviet missiles and long-range bombers assets. The Corona program was also used to produce maps and charts for the Department of Defense and other US government mapping programs.

The first series of Corona satellites were the Keyhole 1 (KH-1) satellites based on the Agena-A upper stage, which not only offered housing but whose engine provided attitude control in orbit. The KH-1 payload included the C (for Corona) single, vertical-looking, panoramic camera that scanned back and forth, exposing its film at a right angle to the line of flight. The camera, built by Fairchild Camera and Instrument with a f/5.0 aperture and 61 centimetres (24 in) focal length, had a ground resolution of 12.9 metres (42 ft). Film was returned from orbit by a single General Electric Satellite Return Vehicle (SRV) constructed by General Electric. The SRV was equipped with an onboard small solid-fuel retro motor to deorbit at the end of the mission. Recovery of the capsule was done in mid-air by a specially equipped aircraft.

The Discoverer program began with a series of three test flights whose satellites carried no cameras, all launched in the first half of 1959. There followed eight operational Discoverer satellites, all of them partial or complete failures, though Discoverer 11, launched 15 April 1960, carried a new vacuum-resistant film and was the first mission on which the onboard camera worked properly. Discoverer 11 failed on reentry, caused by the explosion of its spin motor. Though Discoverer 12, a diagnostic flight to determine the causes of the various issues plaguing the program, was lost shortly after launch on 29 June 1960, the identical Discoverer 13 functioned perfectly during its 10–11 August mission. With Discoverer 14, operational missions would resume.

== Spacecraft ==
The battery-powered satellite was of similar configuration to prior Discoverers, being housed in an Agena-A stage and composed of a satellite bus and SRV equipped with the C camera. It massed 810 kilograms (1,790 lb) Discoverer 14 carried 9.1 kilograms (20 lb) of film, half the full carrying capacity, but more than the 7.3 kilograms (16 lb) carried by Discoverer 11. The satellite also carried a Transit on Discoverer (TOD) payload designed to test orbital tracking techniques for the Transit navigational satellite program.

== Mission ==
Launched into a polar orbit by a Thor-Agena A booster on 18 August 1960 at 19:55:00 GMT from Vandenberg LC 75-3-4 by a Thor DM-21 Agena-A rocket, Discoverer 14 was incorrectly positioned at first and on the verge of tumbling during its first few orbits. Halfway through the scheduled flight period, the satellite stabilized, allowing normal operations. On 19 August 1960, over Alaska on the 17th pass around the Earth, Discoverer 14 ejected the SRV with its film roll fully used. Retrorockets attached to the SRV fired to slow it for the return from orbit. Its parachute was sighted 360 miles (580 km) southwest of Honolulu by the crew of a US Air Force C-119 recovery aircraft ("Pelican 9"), piloted by Captain Harold E. Mitchell, from the 6593rd Test Squadron based at Hickam Air Force Base, Hawaii. The SRV was recovered in midair by the aircraft on its third pass, the first successful recovery of film from an orbiting satellite and the first aerial recovery of an object returning from Earth orbit. For this feat, Captain Mitchell was awarded the Distinguished Flying Cross and his crew all received Air Medals.

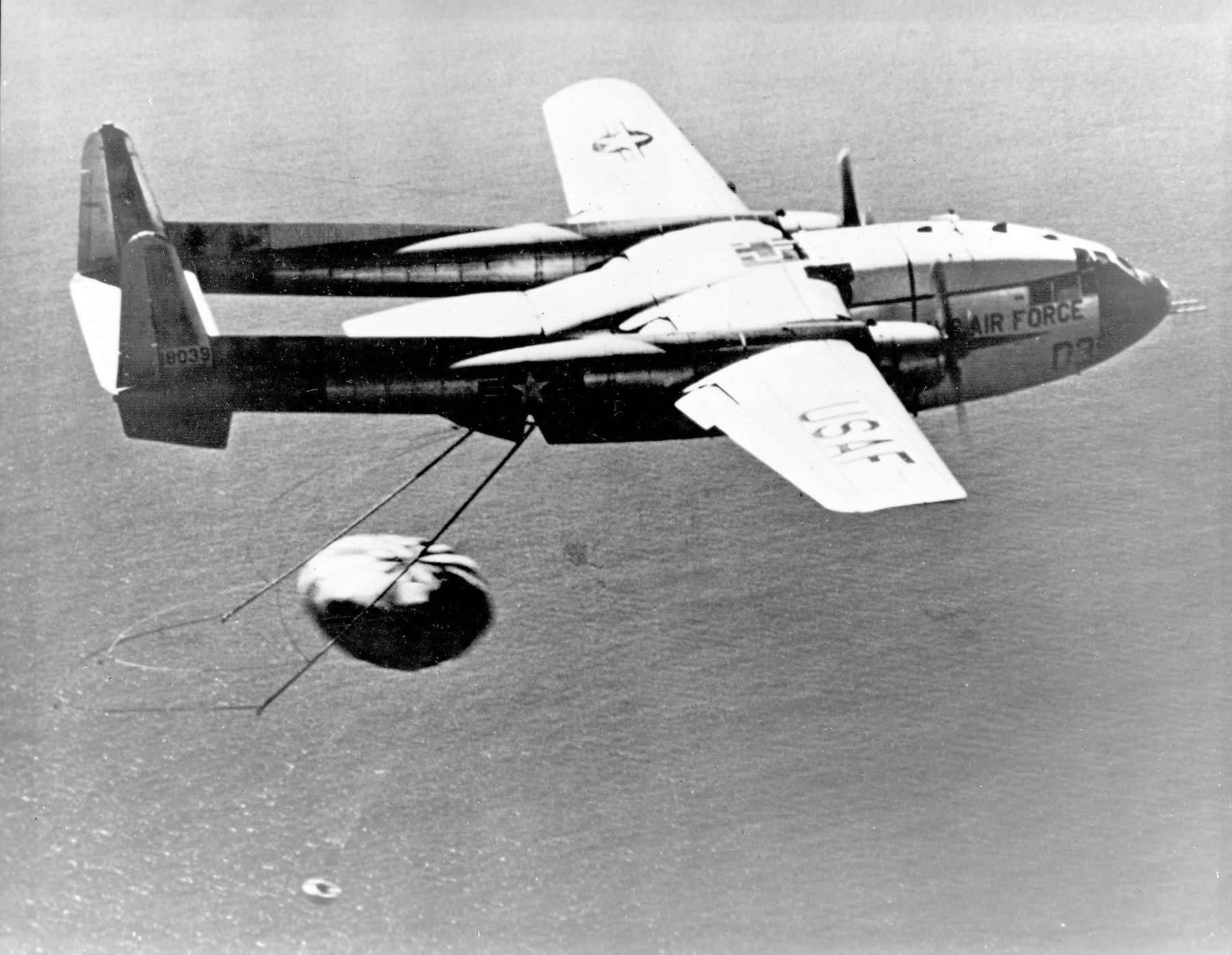
Mid-air film recovery.

Discoverer 14 disintegrated on reentry, 16 September 1960.

== Results and legacy ==
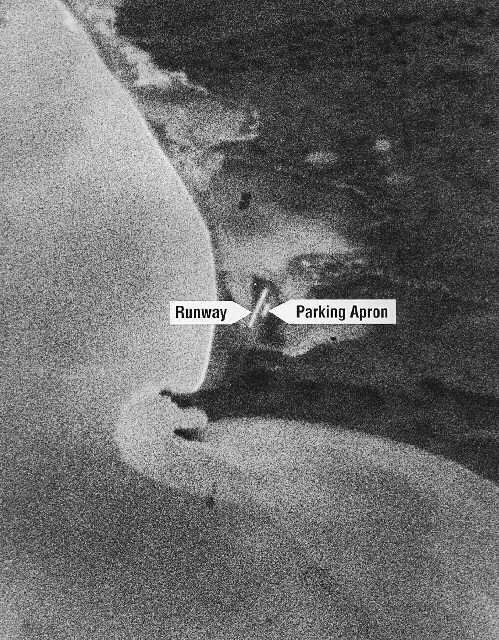
The first reconnaissance picture made by a specialized satellite, depicting Mys Shmidta airfield, in Russia, on 18 August 1960.

With a single orbital mission, the Corona program was proven a conclusive success. The United States recovered broader photographic coverage of the Soviet Union from Discoverer 14 than had been achieved in all of the prior U-2 missions to date. The Corona program went on to comprise 145 flights in eight satellite series, the last mission launching on 25 May 1972. CORONA was declassified in 1995, and a formal acknowledgement of the existence of US reconnaissance programs, past and present, was issued in September 1996.

== See also ==
- First images of Earth from space
