= 1959 in spaceflight (January–June) =

This article lists orbital and suborbital launches during the first half of the year 1959.

For all other spaceflight activities, see 1959 in spaceflight. For launches in the second half of 1959 see List of spaceflight launches in July–December 1959.

== Orbital launches ==
- ← Jan
- Feb
- Mar
- Apr
- May
- Jun
- Jul
- Aug
- Sep
- Oct
- Nov
- Dec →

Date and time (UTC)	Rocket	Flight number	Launch site		LSP	
Date and time (UTC)	Payload (⚀ = CubeSat)	Operator	Orbit	Function	Decay (UTC)	Outcome
Date and time (UTC)	Remarks					
=== January ===
2 January; 16:41:21	(Soviet Union) Luna	B1-6	(Soviet Union) Baikonur Site 1/5		(Soviet Union) MVS	
2 January; 16:41:21	(Soviet Union) Luna 1 (Ye-1 №4/Mechta)	MVS	Intended: HEO to Lunar impact Achieved: Heliocentric	Lunar impactor	In orbit	Partial failure
2 January; 16:41:21	Due to a malfunction of the ground control system, the duration of the second stage burn was incorrect, and it missed the moon by 5,995 kilometers, becoming the first man-made object to escape Earth and reach Heliocentric orbit.					
21 January	(United States) Thor-DM18 Agena-A		(United States) Vandenberg SLC-1W (75-3-4)		(United States) US Air Force	
21 January	(United States) Discovery (KH-1 Prototype)	ARPA	Planned: Low Earth	Technology demonstration	N/A	Destroyed prior to launch
21 January	Destroyed prior to launch.					
← Jan; Feb; Mar; Apr; May; Jun; Jul; Aug; Sep; Oct; Nov; Dec →; === February ===
17 February; 15:55	(United States) Vanguard	SLV-4	(United States) Cape Canaveral LC-18A		(United States) US Navy	
17 February; 15:55	(United States) Vanguard 2 (Cloud Cover Satellite 2)	NRL	Medium Earth	Atmospheric	In orbit	Successful
17 February; 15:55	2nd Successful launch of the Vanguard Program. Still in orbit today.					
28 February; 21:41:16	(United States) Thor DM-18 Agena-A		(United States) Vandenberg SLC-1W (75-3-4)		(United States) US Air Force	
28 February; 21:41:16	(United States) Discoverer 1 (KH-1 prototype)	CIA DST	Low Earth (Polar)	Technology	6 March	Launch failure
28 February; 21:41:16	Maiden flight of Thor-Agena and first launch from Vandenberg. Agena telemetry lost T+730 seconds. Fate of the payload unknown, but generally presumed to have impacted somewhere in Antarctica.					
← Jan; Feb; Mar; Apr; May; Jun; Jul; Aug; Sep; Oct; Nov; Dec →; === March ===
3 March; 05:10:56	(United States) Juno II	AM-14	(United States) Cape Canaveral LC-5		(United States) ABMA	
3 March; 05:10:56	(United States) Pioneer 4	NASA/ABMA	Heliocentric	Lunar flyby	In orbit	Partial launch failure
3 March; 05:10:56	Second stage burned for longer than planned, resulting in more distant flyby than planned.					
← Jan; Feb; Mar; Apr; May; Jun; Jul; Aug; Sep; Oct; Nov; Dec →; === April ===
13 April; 21:18:39	(United States) Thor DM-18 Agena-A		(United States) Vandenberg SLC-1W (75-3-4)		(United States) US Air Force	
13 April; 21:18:39	(United States) Discoverer 2 (KH-1 prototype)	CIA DST	Low Earth	Technology	26 April	Partial spacecraft failure
13 April; 21:18:39	(United States) SRV	CIA DST	Low Earth	Technology	26 April	Partial spacecraft failure
13 April; 21:18:39	Capsule recovery failed due to timer error. May have been recovered by the Soviet Union, inspiring plot of 1963 Alistair MacLean novel Ice Station Zebra.					
14 April; 02:49:46	(United States) Vanguard	SLV-5	(United States) Cape Canaveral LC-18A		(United States) US Navy	
14 April; 02:49:46	(United States) Vanguard (Magnetometer Satellite)	NRL	Intended: Medium Earth	Radiation	14 April	Launch failure
14 April; 02:49:46	(United States) Vanguard Balloon	NRL	Intended: Medium Earth	Air density	14 April	Launch failure
14 April; 02:49:46	Second stage damaged during separation, failed to reach orbit, first launch of multiple satellites on a single rocket.					
← Jan; Feb; Mar; Apr; May; Jun; Jul; Aug; Sep; Oct; Nov; Dec →; === June ===
3 June; 20:09:20	(United States) Thor DM-18 Agena-A		(United States) Vandenberg SLC-1W (75-3-4)		(United States) US Air Force	
3 June; 20:09:20	(United States) Discoverer 3 (KH-1 Prototype)	CIA DST	Intended: Low Earth	Technology	3 June	Launch failure
3 June; 20:09:20	(United States) SRV	CIA DST	Low Earth	Technology	3 June	Launch failure
3 June; 20:09:20	Agena attitude control malfunction pointed the stage in the wrong direction, sending it into the Pacific Ocean rather than orbit.					
18 June; 08:08	(Soviet Union) Luna (8K72)	I1-7	(Soviet Union) Baikonur Site 1/5		(Soviet Union) MVS	
18 June; 08:08	(Soviet Union) Luna E-1A №1 (Ye-1A №5)	MVS	Intended: Heliocentric	Lunar impactor	18 June	Launch failure
18 June; 08:08	Internal guidance system failed at T+153 seconds after launch and the vehicle was destroyed by range safety.					
22 June; 20:16:09	(United States) Vanguard	SLV-6	(United States) Cape Canaveral LC-18A		(United States) US Navy	
22 June; 20:16:09	(United States) Vanguard (Radiation Balance Satellite)	NRL	Intended: Medium Earth	Radiation	22 June	Launch failure
22 June; 20:16:09	Second stage propulsion system malfunctioned, failed to reach orbit.					
25 June; 22:47:45	(United States) Thor DM-18 Agena-A		(United States) Vandenberg SLC-1E (75-3-5)		(United States) US Air Force	
25 June; 22:47:45	(United States) Discoverer 4 (KH-1 1)	CIA DST	Intended: Low Earth	Optical imaging	25 June	Launch failure
25 June; 22:47:45	(United States) SRV 102	CIA DST	Low Earth	Technology	25 June	Launch failure
25 June; 22:47:45	Agena developed insufficient thrust to attain orbital velocity.					
← Jan; Feb; Mar; Apr; May; Jun; Jul; Aug; Sep; Oct; Nov; Dec →
For flights after 30 June, see 1959 in spaceflight (July-December)

== Suborbital flights ==
Date and time (UTC)	Rocket	Flight number	Launch site		LSP	
Date and time (UTC)	Payload (⚀ = CubeSat)	Operator	Orbit	Function	Decay (UTC)	Outcome
Date and time (UTC)	Remarks					
10 January; 11:00	(Soviet Union) A-1		(Soviet Union) Ostrov Kheysa		(Soviet Union) MVS	
10 January; 11:00		MVS	Suborbital	Ionospheric; Aeronomy	10 January	Successful
10 January; 11:00	Apogee: 100 kilometres (62 mi)					
16 January; 04:00	(United States) SM-65B Atlas		(United States) Cape Canaveral LC-14		(United States) US Air Force	
16 January; 04:00		US Air Force	Suborbital	Missile test	16 January	Launch failure
16 January; 04:00	Apogee: 100 kilometres (62 mi)					
19 January; 15:42	(United States) UGM-27 Polaris AX		(United States) Cape Canaveral LC-25A		(United States) US Navy	
19 January; 15:42		US Navy	Suborbital	Missile test	19 January	Launch failure
19 January; 15:42	Apogee: 200 kilometres (120 mi)					
22 January; 00:10	(United States) PGM-19 Jupiter		(United States) Cape Canaveral LC-5		(United States) US Air Force	
22 January; 00:10		US Air Force	Suborbital	Missile test	22 January	Successful
22 January; 00:10	Apogee: 500 kilometres (310 mi)					
23 January	(United States) Thor DM-18 Able-II		(United States) Cape Canaveral LC-17A		(United States) US Air Force	
23 January	(United States) RVX-1	US Air Force	Suborbital	REV test	23 January	Launch failure
27 January; 17:00	(France) Daniel		(France) CERES		(France) ONERA	
27 January; 17:00		ONERA	Suborbital	Aeronomy	27 January	Successful
27 January; 17:00	Apogee: 127 kilometres (79 mi)					
27 January; 23:34	(United States) SM-65C Atlas		(United States) Cape Canaveral LC-12		(United States) US Air Force	
27 January; 23:34		US Air Force	Suborbital	Missile test	27 January	Successful
27 January; 23:34	Apogee: 990 kilometres (620 mi)					
28 January	(United States) Nike-Cajun		(United States) Wallops Island		(United States) ARPA	
28 January	(United States) Beacon Test 4	ARPA/NASA	Suborbital	Technology	28 January	Successful
28 January	Apogee: 122 kilometres (76 mi)					
30 January; 22:53	(United States) PGM-17 Thor DM-18A		(United States) Cape Canaveral LC-17B		(United States) US Air Force	
30 January; 22:53		US Air Force	Suborbital	Missile test	30 January	Successful
30 January; 22:53	Apogee: 520 kilometres (320 mi)					
4 February; 08:01	(United States) SM-65B Atlas		(United States) Cape Canaveral LC-11		(United States) US Air Force	
4 February; 08:01		US Air Force	Suborbital	Missile test	4 February	Successful
4 February; 08:01	Apogee: 990 kilometres (620 mi), final flight of Atlas B					
5 February; 14:45	(United States) Aerobee-150 (Hi)		(United States) Holloman LC-A		(United States) US Air Force	
5 February; 14:45		US Air Force	Suborbital		5 February	Successful
5 February; 14:45	Apogee: 212 kilometres (132 mi)					
6 February; 21:22	(United States) HGM-25A Titan I		(United States) Cape Canaveral LC-15		(United States) US Air Force	
6 February; 21:22		US Air Force	Suborbital	Missile test	6 February	Successful
6 February; 21:22	Maiden flight of Titan I, battleship second stage, apogee: 1,000 kilometres (620 mi)					
20 February; 05:38	(United States) SM-65C Atlas		(United States) Cape Canaveral LC-12		(United States) US Air Force	
20 February; 05:38		US Air Force	Suborbital	Missile test	20 February	Launch failure
20 February; 05:38	Apogee: 100 kilometres (62 mi)					
25 February; 19:45	(United States) HGM-25A Titan I		(United States) Cape Canaveral LC-15		(United States) US Air Force	
25 February; 19:45		US Air Force	Suborbital	Missile test	25 February	Successful
25 February; 19:45	Battleship second stage, apogee: 1,000 kilometres (620 mi)					
27 February; 15:44	(United States) Aerobee		(United States) Holloman LC-A		(United States) US Air Force	
27 February; 15:44		US Air Force	Suborbital	Solar	27 February	Successful
27 February; 15:44	Apogee: 210 kilometres (130 mi)					
27 February; 19:16	(United States) UGM-27 Polaris AX		(United States) Cape Canaveral LC-25A		(United States) US Navy	
27 February; 19:16		US Navy	Suborbital	Missile test	27 February	Launch failure
27 February; 19:16	Apogee: 2 kilometres (1.2 mi)					
27 February; 23:50	(United States) PGM-19 Jupiter		(United States) Cape Canaveral LC-26B		(United States) US Air Force	
27 February; 23:50		US Air Force	Suborbital	Missile test	28 February	Successful
27 February; 23:50	Apogee: 500 kilometres (310 mi)					
28 February; 07:58	(United States) Thor DM-18 Able-II		(United States) Cape Canaveral LC-17A		(United States) US Air Force	
28 February; 07:58	(United States) RVX-1	US Air Force	Suborbital	REV test	28 February	Successful
28 February; 07:58	Apogee: 520 kilometres (320 mi)					
3 March	(United States) Trailblazer 1		(United States) Wallops Island		(United States) NASA	
3 March		NASA	Suborbital	REV test	3 March	Successful
3 March	Apogee: 260 kilometres (160 mi)					
4 March; 11:14	(United Kingdom) Skylark-2		(Australia) Woomera LA-2		(United Kingdom) RAE	
4 March; 11:14		RAE; UCL; Queen's	Suborbital	Aeronomy	4 March	Launch failure
4 March; 11:14	Apogee: 30 kilometres (19 mi)					
7 March; 19:34	(France) Véronique		(France) Hammaguir Blandine		(France) CASDN	
7 March; 19:34		CASDN	Suborbital	Aeronomy	7 March	Launch failure
7 March; 19:34	Apogee: 35 kilometres (22 mi), released sodium					
10 March; 18:40	(France) Véronique		(France) Hammaguir Blandine		(France) CASDN	
10 March; 18:40		CASDN	Suborbital	Aeronomy	10 March	Successful
10 March; 18:40	Apogee: 124 kilometres (77 mi), released sodium					
12 March; 05:44	(France) Véronique		(France) Hammaguir Blandine		(France) CASDN	
12 March; 05:44		CASDN	Suborbital	Aeronomy	12 March	Successful
12 March; 05:44	Apogee: 174 kilometres (108 mi), released sodium					
12 March; 10:50	(United Kingdom) Black Knight 201		(Australia) Woomera LA-5A		(United Kingdom) RAE	
12 March; 10:50		RAE	Suborbital	Test flight	12 March	Successful
12 March; 10:50	Apogee: 537 kilometres (334 mi)					
12 March; 15:44	(United States) Aerobee-150 (Hi)		(United States) Holloman LC-A		(United States) US Air Force	
12 March; 15:44		US Air Force	Suborbital		12 March	Successful
12 March; 15:44	Apogee: 210 kilometres (130 mi)					
13 March; 13:50	(United States) Aerobee-150 (Hi)		(United States) White Sands LC-35		(United States) US Navy	
13 March; 13:50		NRL	Suborbital		13 March	Successful
13 March; 13:50	Apogee: 170 kilometres (110 mi)					
17 March; 01:46	(Soviet Union) R-7 Semyorka		(Soviet Union) Baikonur Site 1/5		(Soviet Union) MVS	
17 March; 01:46		MVS	Suborbital	Missile test	17 March	Successful
17 March; 01:46	Apogee: 1,350 kilometres (840 mi)					
17 March	(United States) Honest John-Nike-Nike-20"SM		(United States) Wallops Island		(United States) NASA	
17 March		NASA	Suborbital	Test flight	17 March	Successful
17 March	Apogee: 1,380 kilometres (860 mi)					
19 March; 00:59	(United States) SM-65C Atlas		(United States) Cape Canaveral LC-12		(United States) US Air Force	
19 March; 00:59		US Air Force	Suborbital	Missile test	19 March	Launch failure
19 March; 00:59	Apogee: 200 kilometres (120 mi)					
21 March; 06:19	(United States) Thor DM-18 Able-II		(United States) Cape Canaveral LC-17A		(United States) US Air Force	
21 March; 06:19	(United States) RVX-1	US Air Force	Suborbital	REV test	21 March	Successful
21 March; 06:19	Apogee: 520 kilometres (320 mi)					
22 March; 00:58	(United States) PGM-17 Thor DM-18A		(United States) Cape Canaveral LC-18B		(United States) US Air Force	
22 March; 00:58		US Air Force	Suborbital	Missile test	22 March	Successful
22 March; 00:58	Apogee: 520 kilometres (320 mi)					
25 March; 05:25	(Soviet Union) R-7 Semyorka		(Soviet Union) Baikonur Site 1/5		(Soviet Union) MVS	
25 March; 05:25		MVS	Suborbital	Missile test	25 March	Successful
25 March; 05:25	Apogee: 1,350 kilometres (840 mi)					
27 March; 04:02	(United States) PGM-17 Thor DM-18A		(United States) Cape Canaveral LC-17B		(United States) US Air Force	
27 March; 04:02		US Air Force	Suborbital	Missile test	27 March	Successful
27 March; 04:02	Apogee: 520 kilometres (320 mi)					
30 March; 15:01	(United States) Aerobee-150 (Hi)		(United States) Holloman LC-A		(United States) US Air Force	
30 March; 15:01		US Air Force	Suborbital		30 March	Successful
30 March; 15:01	Apogee: 201 kilometres (125 mi)					
30 March; 16:45	(United States) Aerobee-150 (Hi)		(United States) White Sands LC-35		(United States) US Navy	
30 March; 16:45		NRL	Suborbital		30 March	Successful
30 March; 16:45	Apogee: 238 kilometres (148 mi)					
30 March; 22:53	(Soviet Union) R-7 Semyorka		(Soviet Union) Baikonur Site 1/5		(Soviet Union) MVS	
30 March; 22:53		MVS	Suborbital	Missile test	30 March	Launch failure
30 March; 22:53	Apogee: 1,000 kilometres (620 mi)					
30 March	(Soviet Union) R-12 Dvina		(Soviet Union) Kapustin Yar		(Soviet Union) MVS	
30 March		MVS	Suborbital	Missile test	30 March	Successful
30 March	Apogee: 402 kilometres (250 mi)					
3 April; 17:11	(United States) HGM-25A Titan I		(United States) Cape Canaveral LC-15		(United States) US Air Force	
3 April; 17:11		US Air Force	Suborbital	Missile test	3 April	Successful
3 April; 17:11	Battleship second stage, apogee: 1,000 kilometres (620 mi)					
4 April; 00:34	(United States) PGM-19 Jupiter		(United States) Cape Canaveral LC-26B		(United States) US Air Force	
4 April; 00:34		US Air Force	Suborbital	Missile test	4 April	Successful
4 April; 00:34	Apogee: 500 kilometres (310 mi)					
4 April	(United States) WS-199B Bold Orion II		(United States) B-47, Cape Canaveral		(United States) US Air Force	
4 April		US Air Force	Suborbital	Missile test	4 April	Successful
4 April	Apogee: 200 kilometres (120 mi)					
7 April; 14:46	(United States) Aerobee-150 (Hi)		(United States) White Sands LC-35		(United States) US Air Force	
7 April; 14:46		US Air Force	Suborbital		7 April	Launch failure
7 April; 14:46	Apogee: 317 kilometres (197 mi)					
8 April; 06:35	(United States) Thor DM-18 Able-II		(United States) Cape Canaveral LC-17A		(United States) US Air Force	
8 April; 06:35	(United States) RVX-1	US Air Force	Suborbital	REV test	8 April	Successful
8 April; 06:35	Apogee: 1,230 kilometres (760 mi)					
11 April	(Soviet Union) R-12 Dvina		(Soviet Union) Kapustin Yar		(Soviet Union) MVS	
11 April		MVS	Suborbital	Missile test	11 April	Successful
11 April	Apogee: 402 kilometres (250 mi)					
14 April; 21:46	(United States) SM-65D Atlas		(United States) Cape Canaveral LC-13		(United States) US Air Force	
14 April; 21:46		US Air Force	Suborbital	Missile test	14 April	Launch failure
14 April; 21:46	Apogee: 1 kilometre (0.62 mi)					
14 April	(Soviet Union) R-12 Dvina		(Soviet Union) Kapustin Yar		(Soviet Union) MVS	
14 April		MVS	Suborbital	Missile test	14 April	Successful
14 April	Apogee: 402 kilometres (250 mi)					
15 April; 14:46	(United States) Aerobee-150 (Hi)		(United States) Holloman LC-A		(United States) US Air Force	
15 April; 14:46		US Air Force	Suborbital		15 April	Successful
15 April; 14:46	Apogee: 100 kilometres (62 mi)					
16 April; 20:46	(United States) PGM-17 Thor DM-18A		(United States) Vandenberg LC-75-2-8		(United Kingdom) Royal Air Force	
16 April; 20:46		Royal Air Force	Suborbital	Missile test	16 April	Successful
16 April; 20:46	Apogee: 520 kilometres (320 mi)					
20 April; 15:30	(United States) UGM-27 Polaris AX		(United States) Cape Canaveral LC-25A		(United States) US Navy	
20 April; 15:30		US Navy	Suborbital	Missile test	20 April	Successful
20 April; 15:30	Apogee: 500 kilometres (310 mi)					
21 April; 01:05	(United States) Aerobee-150 (Hi)		(United States) Holloman LC-A		(United States) US Air Force	
21 April; 01:05		US Air Force	Suborbital		21 April	Successful
21 April; 01:05	Apogee: 235 kilometres (146 mi)					
22 April; 19:29	(United States) Nike-Cajun		(United States) Holloman		(United States) US Air Force	
22 April; 19:29		US Air Force	Suborbital	Ionospheric	22 April	Successful
22 April; 19:29	Apogee: 100 kilometres (62 mi)					
23 April; 05:30	(United States) PGM-17 Thor DM-18A		(United States) Cape Canaveral LC-17B		(United States) US Air Force	
23 April; 05:30		US Air Force	Suborbital	Missile test	23 April	Successful
23 April; 05:30	Apogee: 520 kilometres (320 mi)					
25 April; 05:00	(United States) PGM-17 Thor DM-18A		(United States) Cape Canaveral LC-18B		(United States) US Air Force	
25 April; 05:00		US Air Force	Suborbital	Missile test	25 April	Successful
25 April; 05:00	Apogee: 520 kilometres (320 mi)					
29 April	(Soviet Union) R-12 Dvina		(Soviet Union) Kapustin Yar		(Soviet Union) MVS	
29 April		MVS	Suborbital	Missile test	29 April	Successful
29 April	Apogee: 402 kilometres (250 mi)					
1 May	(United States) Terrier-ASROC-Cajun		(United States) Point Arguello		(United States) US Navy	
1 May		US Navy	Suborbital	Test flight	1 May	Launch failure
2 May	(France) OPd-56-39-22D (Antares)		(France) CERES		(France) ONERA	
2 May		ONERA	Suborbital	REV test	2 May	Successful
2 May	Apogee: 150 kilometres (93 mi)					
4 May; 18:30	(United States) HGM-25A Titan I		(United States) Cape Canaveral LC-15		(United States) US Air Force	
4 May; 18:30		US Air Force	Suborbital	Missile test	4 May	Successful
4 May; 18:30	Battleship second stage, apogee: 1,000 kilometres (620 mi)					
5 May; 01:45	(United States) Aerobee AJ10-34		(United States) White Sands LC-35		(United States) US Air Force	
5 May; 01:45		US Air Force	Suborbital	Aeronomy	5 May	Successful
5 May; 01:45	Apogee: 113 kilometres (70 mi)					
7 May; 01:47	(United States) PGM-19 Jupiter		(United States) Cape Canaveral LC-26B		(United States) US Air Force	
7 May; 01:47		US Air Force	Suborbital	Missile test	7 May	Successful
7 May; 01:47	Apogee: 500 kilometres (310 mi)					
8 May; 19:28	(United States) UGM-27 Polaris AX		(United States) Cape Canaveral LC-25A		(United States) US Navy	
8 May; 19:28		US Navy	Suborbital	Missile test	8 May	Successful
8 May; 19:28	Apogee: 500 kilometres (310 mi)					
9 May; 18:59	(Soviet Union) R-7 Semyorka		(Soviet Union) Baikonur Site 1/5		(Soviet Union) MVS	
9 May; 18:59		MVS	Suborbital	Missile test	9 May	Launch failure
9 May; 18:59	Apogee: 1,000 kilometres (620 mi)					
12 May; 11:39	(United States) Aerobee-150 (Hi)		(United States) Holloman LC-A		(United States) US Air Force	
12 May; 11:39		US Air Force	Suborbital		12 May	Successful
12 May; 11:39	Apogee: 145 kilometres (90 mi)					
12 May; 17:35	(United States) PGM-17 Thor DM-18A		(United States) Cape Canaveral LC-17B		(United States) US Air Force	
12 May; 17:35		US Air Force	Suborbital	Missile test	12 May	Successful
12 May; 17:35	Apogee: 520 kilometres (320 mi)					
12 May	(Soviet Union) R-12 Dvina		(Soviet Union) Kapustin Yar		(Soviet Union) MVS	
12 May		MVS	Suborbital	Missile test	12 May	Successful
12 May	Apogee: 402 kilometres (250 mi)					
14 May; 05:52	(United States) PGM-19 Jupiter		(United States) Cape Canaveral LC-5		(United States) US Air Force	
14 May; 05:52		US Air Force	Suborbital	Missile test	14 May	Successful
14 May; 05:52	Apogee: 500 kilometres (310 mi)					
14 May	(Soviet Union) R-12 Dvina		(Soviet Union) Kapustin Yar		(Soviet Union) MVS	
14 May		MVS	Suborbital	Missile test	14 May	Successful
14 May	Apogee: 402 kilometres (250 mi)					
15 May; 22:10	(United States) Arcon		(United States) Wallops Island		(United States) NASA	
15 May; 22:10		NASA	Suborbital	Test flight	15 May	Launch failure
15 May; 22:10	Apogee: 1 kilometre (0.62 mi)					
15 May	(Soviet Union) R-12 Dvina		(Soviet Union) Kapustin Yar		(Soviet Union) MVS	
15 May		MVS	Suborbital	Missile test	15 May	Successful
15 May	Apogee: 402 kilometres (250 mi)					
18 May; 23:16	(United States) UGM-27 Polaris AX		(United States) Cape Canaveral LC-25A		(United States) US Navy	
18 May; 23:16		US Navy	Suborbital	Missile test	18 May	Launch failure
18 May; 23:16	Apogee: 10 kilometres (6.2 mi)					
19 May; 04:30	(United States) SM-65D Atlas		(United States) Cape Canaveral LC-14		(United States) US Air Force	
19 May; 04:30		US Air Force	Suborbital	Missile test	19 May	Launch failure
19 May; 04:30	Apogee: 1 kilometre (0.62 mi)					
21 May; 06:40	(United States) Thor DM-18 Able-II		(United States) Cape Canaveral LC-17A		(United States) US Air Force	
21 May; 06:40	(United States) RVX-1	US Air Force	Suborbital	REV test	21 May	Successful
21 May; 06:40	Apogee: 520 kilometres (320 mi)					
22 May; 11:15	(United States) Aerobee-150 (Hi)		(United States) Holloman LC-A		(United States) US Air Force	
22 May; 11:15		US Air Force	Suborbital		22 May	Successful
22 May; 11:15	Apogee: 100 kilometres (62 mi)					
23 May; 02:42	(United States) PGM-17 Thor DM-18A		(United States) Cape Canaveral LC-18B		(United States) US Air Force	
23 May; 02:42		US Air Force	Suborbital	Missile test	23 May	Successful
23 May; 02:42	Apogee: 520 kilometres (320 mi)					
27 May; 04:51	(United States) Nike-Cajun		(United States) White Sands		(United States) US Air Force	
27 May; 04:51		US Air Force	Suborbital	Aeronomy	27 May	Successful
27 May; 04:51	Apogee: 169 kilometres (105 mi)					
27 May; 19:55	(United States) Nike-Cajun		(United States) White Sands		(United States) US Air Force	
27 May; 19:55		US Air Force	Suborbital	Aeronomy	27 May	Successful
27 May; 19:55	Apogee: 177 kilometres (110 mi)					
28 May; 07:35:02	(United States) PGM-19 Jupiter		(United States) Cape Canaveral LC-26B		(United States) US Air Force	
28 May; 07:35:02	(United States) Bioflight 2	US Air Force	Suborbital	Biological; Missile test	28 May	Successful
28 May; 07:35:02	Apogee: 483 kilometres (300 mi)					
30 May; 21:42	(Soviet Union) R-7 Semyorka		(Soviet Union) Baikonur Site 1/5		(Soviet Union) MVS	
30 May; 21:42		MVS	Suborbital	Missile test	30 May	Launch failure
30 May; 21:42	Apogee: 1,000 kilometres (620 mi)					
30 May	(Soviet Union) R-12 Dvina		(Soviet Union) Kapustin Yar		(Soviet Union) MVS	
30 May		MVS	Suborbital	Missile test	30 May	Successful
30 May	Apogee: 402 kilometres (250 mi)					
May	(Australia) Long Tom		(Australia) Woomera LA-2		(Australia) WRE	
May		WRE	Suborbital	Aeronomy		Successful
May	Apogee: 100 kilometres (62 mi)					
2 June	(Soviet Union) R-12 Dvina		(Soviet Union) Kapustin Yar		(Soviet Union) MVS	
2 June		MVS	Suborbital	Missile test	2 June	Successful
2 June	Apogee: 402 kilometres (250 mi)					
5 June; 04:15	(United States) Trailblazer 1		(United States) Wallops Island		(United States) NASA	
5 June; 04:15		NASA	Suborbital	REV test	6 June	Successful
5 June; 04:15	Apogee: 260 kilometres (160 mi)					
6 June; 17:39	(United States) SM-65D Atlas		(United States) Cape Canaveral LC-13		(United States) US Air Force	
6 June; 17:39		US Air Force	Suborbital	Missile test	6 June	Launch failure
6 June; 17:39	Apogee: 80 kilometres (50 mi)					
8 June	(United States) WS-199B Bold Orion I		(United States) B-47, Cape Canaveral		(United States) US Air Force	
8 June		US Air Force	Suborbital	Missile test	8 June	Successful
8 June	Apogee: 100 kilometres (62 mi)					
9 June; 20:34	(Soviet Union) R-7 Semyorka		(Soviet Union) Baikonur Site 1/5		(Soviet Union) MVS	
9 June; 20:34		MVS	Suborbital	Missile test	9 June	Launch failure
9 June; 20:34	Apogee: 1,000 kilometres (620 mi)					
10 June; 16:40	(United States) Aerobee-150 (Hi)		(United States) Holloman LC-A		(United States) US Air Force	
10 June; 16:40		US Air Force	Suborbital		10 June	Successful
10 June; 16:40	Apogee: 225 kilometres (140 mi)					
11 June; 06:44	(United States) Thor DM-18 Able-II		(United States) Cape Canaveral LC-17A		(United States) US Air Force	
11 June; 06:44	(United States) RVX-1	US Air Force	Suborbital	REV test	11 June	Successful
11 June; 06:44	Apogee: 520 kilometres (320 mi)					
11 June; 13:03	(United Kingdom) Black Knight 201		(Australia) Woomera LA-5A		(United Kingdom) RAE	
11 June; 13:03		RAE	Suborbital	Test flight	11 June	Successful
11 June; 13:03	Apogee: 803 kilometres (499 mi)					
12 June; 18:57	(United States) UGM-27 Polaris AX		(United States) Cape Canaveral LC-25A		(United States) US Navy	
12 June; 18:57		US Navy	Suborbital	Missile test	12 June	Launch failure
12 June; 18:57	Apogee: 10 kilometres (6.2 mi)					
15 June	(Soviet Union) R-12 Dvina		(Soviet Union) Kapustin Yar		(Soviet Union) MVS	
15 June		MVS	Suborbital	Missile test	15 June	Successful
15 June	Apogee: 402 kilometres (250 mi)					
16 June; 21:45	(United States) PGM-17 Thor DM-18A		(United States) Vandenberg LC-75-2-7		(United Kingdom) Royal Air Force	
16 June; 21:45		Royal Air Force	Suborbital	Missile test	16 June	Launch failure
16 June; 21:45	Guidance system failed to engage as remove before flight safety wires had not been removed. Vehicle ascended vertically before being destroyed by range safety.					
17 June	(Soviet Union) R-12 Dvina		(Soviet Union) Kapustin Yar		(Soviet Union) MVS	
17 June		MVS	Suborbital	Missile test	17 June	Successful
17 June	Apogee: 402 kilometres (250 mi)					
19 June	(United States) WS-199B Bold Orion I		(United States) B-47, Cape Canaveral		(United States) US Air Force	
19 June		US Air Force	Suborbital	Missile test	19 June	Successful
19 June	Apogee: 100 kilometres (62 mi)					
21 June	(Soviet Union) R-5V Pobeda		(Soviet Union) Kapustin Yar		(Soviet Union) AN	
21 June		AN	Suborbital	Solar	21 June	Successful
21 June	Apogee: 400 kilometres (250 mi)					
22 June; 14:32	(United States) Aerobee		(United States) Holloman LC-A		(United States) US Air Force	
22 June; 14:32		US Air Force	Suborbital	Solar	22 June	Successful
22 June; 14:32	Apogee: 110 kilometres (68 mi)					
23 June; 01:26	(United Kingdom) Skylark-1		(Australia) Woomera LA-2		(United Kingdom) RAE	
23 June; 01:26		RAE	Suborbital	Test flight	23 June	Launch failure
23 June; 01:26	Apogee: 91 kilometres (57 mi)					
24 June; 12:10	(United States) Aerobee-150 (Hi)		(United States) Holloman LC-A		(United States) US Air Force	
24 June; 12:10		US Air Force	Suborbital		24 June	Successful
24 June; 12:10	Apogee: 200 kilometres (120 mi)					
26 June	(United States) PGM-17 Thor DM-18A		(United States) Cape Canaveral LC-18B		(United States) US Air Force	
26 June		US Air Force	Suborbital	Missile test	26 June	Successful
26 June	Apogee: 520 kilometres (320 mi)					
26 June	(United States) Terrier-ASROC-Cajun		(United States) Point Arguello		(United States) US Navy	
26 June		US Navy	Suborbital		26 June	Successful
26 June	Apogee: 100 kilometres (62 mi)					
29 June; 11:33	(United Kingdom) Black Knight 201		(Australia) Woomera LA-5A		(United Kingdom) RAE	
29 June; 11:33		RAE	Suborbital	Test flight	29 June	Successful
29 June; 11:33	Apogee: 442 kilometres (275 mi)					
30 June; 02:37	(United States) PGM-17 Thor DM-18A		(United States) Cape Canaveral LC-17B		(United States) US Air Force	
30 June; 02:37		US Air Force	Suborbital	Missile test	30 June	Successful
30 June; 02:37	Apogee: 1,000 kilometres (620 mi)					
29 June; 15:42	(United States) UGM-27 Polaris AX		(United States) Cape Canaveral LC-25A		(United States) US Navy	
29 June; 15:42		US Navy	Suborbital	Missile test	29 June	Successful
29 June; 15:42	Apogee: 500 kilometres (310 mi)					
June	(Soviet Union) R-13		(Soviet Union) Kapustin Yar		(Soviet Union) VMF	
June		VMF	Suborbital	Missile test		Successful
June	Apogee: 150 kilometres (93 mi)					
