= Timeline of spaceflight =

This is a timeline of known spaceflights, both crewed and uncrewed, sorted chronologically by launch date. Due to its large size, the timeline has been split into smaller articles, one for each year since 1951. There is a separate list for all flights that occurred before 1951.

The list for the year 2026 and for its subsequent years may contain planned launches, but the statistics will only include past launches.

For the purpose of these lists, a spaceflight is defined as any flight that crosses the Kármán line, the FAI-recognized edge of space, which is 100 kilometres (62 miles) above mean sea level (AMSL). The timeline contains all the flights which have either crossed the edge of space, were intended to do so but failed, or are planned in the near future. Notable test flights of spaceflight systems may be listed even if they were not planned to reach space. Some lists are further divided into orbital launches (sending a payload into orbit, whether successful or not) and suborbital flights (e.g. ballistic missiles, sounding rockets, experimental spacecraft).

== Space launch statistics (1957–2026) ==
- Failure
- Partial failure
- Success
- Planned

== Orbital and suborbital launches by year ==
Timelines of Spaceflight
Before 1951	Spaceflight before 1951									
1950s	1951		1952	1953	1954	1955	1956	1957 (Note: First Orbital launch)	1958 (H1, H2)	1959 (H1, H2)
1960s	1960 (T1, T2, T3)	1961 (H1, H2)	1962 (Q1, Q2, Q3, Q4)	1963 (Q1, Q2, Q3, Q4)	1964 (Q1, Q2, Q3, Q4)	1965 (Q1, Q2, Q3, Q4)	1966	1967	1968	1969
1970s	1970	1971	1972	1973	1974	1975	1976	1977	1978	1979
1980s	1980	1981	1982	1983	1984	1985	1986	1987	1988	1989
1990s	1990	1991	1992	1993	1994	1995	1996	1997	1998	1999
2000s	2000	2001	2002	2003	2004	2005	2006	2007	2008	2009
2010s	2010	2011	2012	2013	2014	2015	2016	2017	2018 (H1, H2)	2019 (H1, (H2)
2020s	2020	2021 (H1, H2)	2022 (H1, H2)	2023 (H1, H2)	2024 (H1, H2)	2025 (Q1, Q2, Q3, Q4)	2026 (Q1, Q2, Q3, Q4)	2027	2028	2029
After 2029	List of planned future spaceflight launches									

== Planned deep-space rendezvous after 2029 ==
Date (UTC)	Spacecraft	Event	Remarks
26 December 2030	Lucy	Third gravity assist at Earth	Target altitude 660 km
July 2031	Hayabusa2	Arrival at asteroid 1998 KY26	
July 2031	JUICE	Flyby of Ganymede	
July 2031	JUICE	Jupiter orbit insertion	
July 2032	JUICE	Flyby of Europa	
2 March 2033	Lucy	Flyby of binary asteroid 617 Patroclus-Menoetius	Target altitude 1000 km
December 2034	JUICE	Ganymede orbit insertion	Planned first orbit of a moon other than Earth's

== See also ==
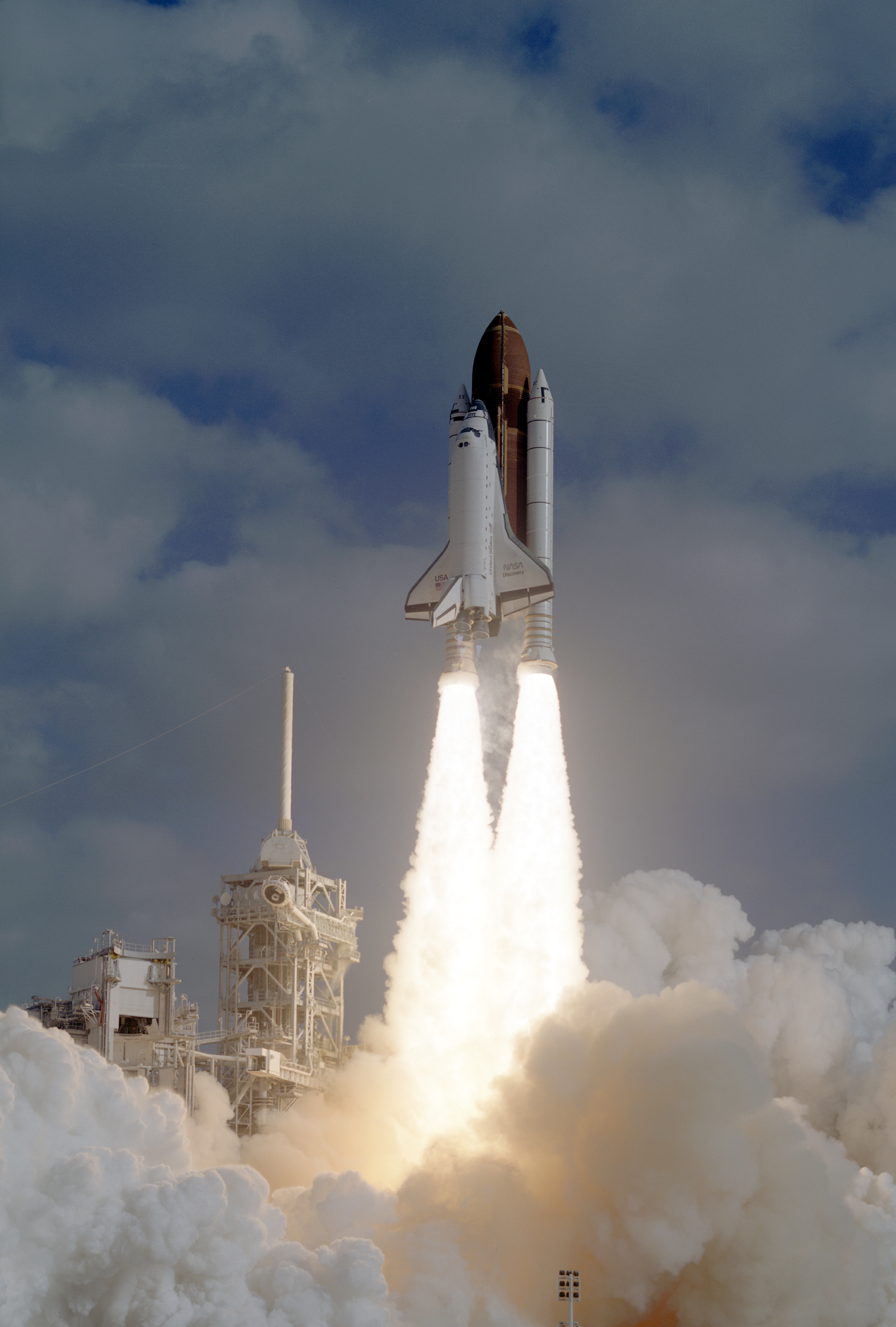
Liftoff of Space Shuttle Discovery on STS-31 mission carrying Hubble Space Telescope

- Discovery and exploration of the Solar System
- Launch vehicle
- List of crewed spacecraft
- Outer space
- Space exploration
- Space launch market competition
- Timeline of private spaceflight
- Timeline of Solar System exploration
- Timeline of space exploration
- History of spaceflight
