= Discoverer 3 =

American reconnaissance satellite

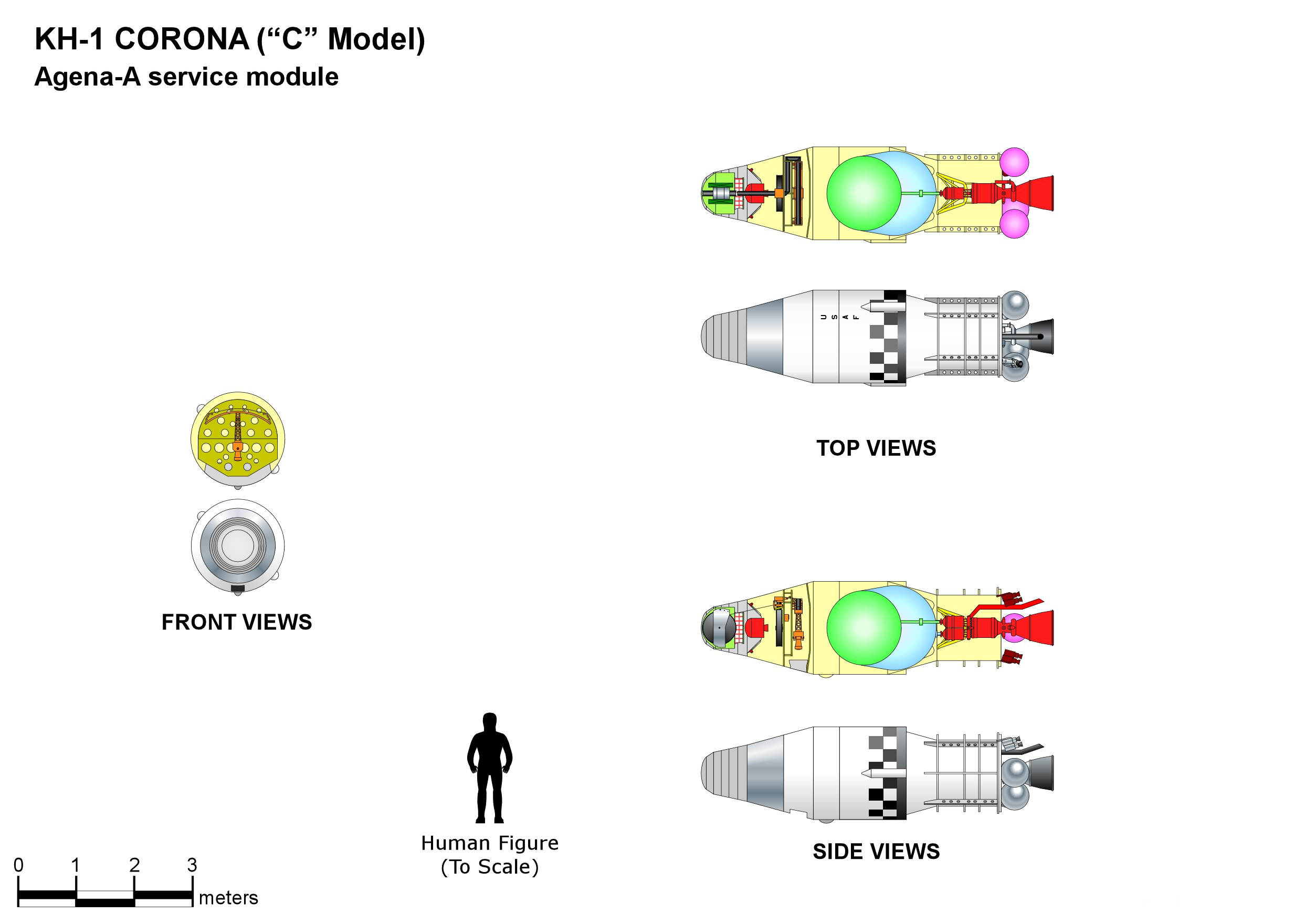
- Mission type: Optical reconnaissance
- Operator: US Air Force / NRO
- Harvard designation: 1959-F02
- SATCAT no.: F00060

Spacecraft properties
- Spacecraft type: CORONA Test Vehicle
- Bus: Agena-A
- Manufacturer: Lockheed
- Launch mass: 843 kilograms (1,858 lb) after orbit insertion

Start of mission
- Launch date: 3 June 1959 20:09:20 GMT
- Rocket: Thor DM-21 Agena-A (Thor 174)
- Launch site: Vandenberg LC 75-3-4

Discoverer 3 was an American optical reconnaissance satellite launched on 3 June 1959 at 20:09:20 GMT, the third of three test flights of the Corona KH-1 spy satellite series. The first Discoverer mission to carry live animal passengers, Discoverer 3 was lost when its carrying Agena-A booster crashed into the Pacific Ocean.

== Background ==
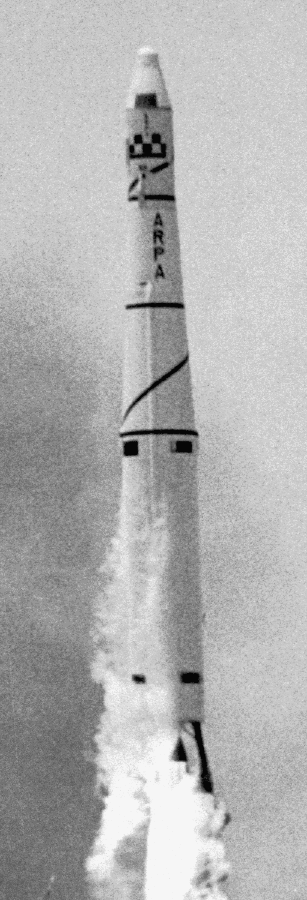
Thor Agena A with Discoverer 3, 3 June 1959

"Discoverer" was the civilian designation and cover for the Corona satellite photo-reconnaissance series of satellites managed by the Advanced Research Projects Agency of the Department of Defense and the U.S. Air Force. The primary goal of the satellites was to replace the U-2 spyplane in surveilling the Sino-Soviet Bloc, determining the disposition and speed of production of Soviet missiles and long-range bombers assess. The Corona program was also used to produce maps and charts for the Department of Defense and other US government mapping programs.

The first series of Corona satellites were the Keyhole 1 (KH-1) satellites based on the Agena-A upper stage, which not only offered housing but whose engine provided attitude control in orbit. The KH-1 payload included the C (for Corona) single, vertical-looking, panoramic camera that scanned back and forth, exposing its film at a right angle to the line of flight. The camera, built by Fairchild Camera and Instrument with a f/5.0 aperture and 61 centimetres (24 in) focal length, had a ground resolution of 12.9 metres (42 ft). Film was returned from orbit by a single General Electric Satellite Return Vehicle (SRV) constructed by General Electric. The SRV was equipped with an onboard small solid-fuel retro motor to deorbit at the end of the mission. Recovery of the capsule was done in mid-air by a specially equipped aircraft.

Discoverer 3 was the third in a series of three camera-less test flights preceding operational KH-1 flights. Previously, Discoverer 1, which carried neither camera nor film capsule, was launched 28 February 1959 after a failed attempt on 21 January 1959. Discoverer 2, launched 13 April 1959, was orbited successfully but its SRV was lost over Norway and never recovered.

== Spacecraft ==
The battery-powered Discoverer 3 was composed of two sections: the satellite proper and the SRV. Together, they massed (843 kilograms (1,858 lb)) after orbit insertion. To facilitate the cover story that Discoverer was a biomedical series of satellites, the capsule was equipped with a life support system designed to support four mice. It was the first time a Discoverer flight was planned with live animal passengers. The mice were physically stronger and more emotionally stable than standard mice, and they were provided with a food supply consisting of a mixture of oatmeal, ground peanuts, orange juice, water, and gelatin. The satellite also carried equipment for measuring radiation in orbit.

== Mission ==
Discoverer 3 was originally scheduled for launch in late May 1959. This attempt was aborted when biomedical telemetry ceased from the SRV and, upon opening the capsule, it was discovered that the payload, four black mice, had poisoned themselves by gnawing at the Krylon coating of their cages. A second launch a few days later was aborted when telemetry indicated a 100% humidity level inside the SRV; payload mice had urinated on the humidity sensor.

The spacecraft was finally launched at 3 June 1959 20:09:20 from Vandenberg LC 75-3-4. Discoverer III sent telemetry data for 13 minutes, reaching a range of 1,200 miles (1,900 km) downrange and a speed of nearly 18,000 mph (29,000 km/h), before abruptly going silent. After 24 hours of failure to obtain radar or telemetry signals, it was concluded that the spacecraft had been lost. Factors which contributed to the failure were determined to be faulty radar data which triggered an incorrect firing time and velocity target, and an early cutoff of the rocket's firing. During separation of the Agena stage from the Thor first stage, the booster pitched downward, and the Agena and payload crashed into the Pacific Ocean.

The loss of the mice at sea, compounded by a Jupiter suborbital shot failure on May 29 resulting in the death of the payload monkey, Able, generated complaints from a British humane society and several American newspapers.

== Legacy ==
The failure of Discoverer 3 caused a week-long delay in the upcoming Discoverer 4 mission while changes were made to ensure its success. The radar problem was addressed by changes in tracking procedures; the premature propulsion cut-off issue was deemed minor—had it occurred without the faulty radar data, Discoverer 3 would have made orbit.

CORONA began operational flights on 25 Jun 1959 with the launch of Discoverer 4 and achieved its first fully successful flight with the mission of Discoverer 14, launched on August 18, 1960. The program ultimately comprised 145 flights in eight satellite series, the last mission launching on 25 May 1972. CORONA was declassified in 1995, and a formal acknowledgement of the existence of US reconnaissance programs, past and present, was issued in September 1996.
