= 1959 in spaceflight (July–December) =

This article lists orbital and suborbital launches during the second half of the year 1959.

For all other spaceflight activities, see 1959 in spaceflight. For launches in the first half of 1959 see List of spaceflight launches in January–June 1959.

== Orbital launches ==
- ← Jan
- Feb
- Mar
- Apr
- May
- Jun
- Jul
- Aug
- Sep
- Oct
- Nov
- Dec →

Date and time (UTC)	Rocket	Flight number	Launch site		LSP	
Date and time (UTC)	Payload (⚀ = CubeSat)	Operator	Orbit	Function	Decay (UTC)	Outcome
Date and time (UTC)	Remarks					
=== July ===
16 July; 17:37:03	(United States) Juno II	AM-16	(United States) Cape Canaveral LC-5		(United States) ABMA	
16 July; 17:37:03	(United States) Explorer S-1	NASA	Intended: Low Earth	Scientific	+5.5 seconds	Launch failure
16 July; 17:37:03	Destroyed by range safety after rocket went out of control.					
← Jan; Feb; Mar; Apr; May; Jun; Jul; Aug; Sep; Oct; Nov; Dec →; === August ===
7 August; 14:24:20	(United States) Thor DM-18 Able-III		(United States) Cape Canaveral LC-17A		(United States) US Air Force	
7 August; 14:24:20	(United States) Explorer 6 (S-2)	US Air Force	Highly elliptical	Radiation; Imaging	30 June 1961	Successful
13 August; 19:00:08	(United States) Thor DM-18 Agena-A		(United States) Vandenberg SLC-1W (75-3-4)		(United States) US Air Force	
13 August; 19:00:08	(United States) Discoverer 5 (KH-1 2)	CIA DST	Low Earth	Optical imaging	11 February 1961	Spacecraft failure
13 August; 19:00:08	(United States) SRV 111	CIA DST	Low Earth	Technology		
13 August; 19:00:08	Electrical system malfunction. Deorbit burn conducted in incorrect direction, raising orbit.					
15 August; 00:31:00	(United States) Juno II	AM-19B	(United States) Cape Canaveral LC-26B		(United States) ABMA	
15 August; 00:31:00	(United States) Beacon 2	NASA/US Army	Intended: Low Earth	Technology	15 August	Launch failure
15 August; 00:31:00	Premature cutoff of first stage, failed to reach orbit.					
19 August; 19:24:44	(United States) Thor DM-18 Agena-A		(United States) Vandenberg SLC-1E (75-3-5)		(United States) US Air Force	
19 August; 19:24:44	(United States) Discoverer 6 (KH-1 3)	CIA DST	Low Earth	Optical imaging	20 October	Spacecraft failure
19 August; 19:24:44	(United States) SRV 105	CIA DST	Low Earth	Technology		
19 August; 19:24:44	Retrorocket malfunctioned.					
← Jan; Feb; Mar; Apr; May; Jun; Jul; Aug; Sep; Oct; Nov; Dec →; === September ===
12 September; 06:39:42	(Soviet Union) Luna (8K72)	I1-7B	(Soviet Union) Baikonur Site 1/5		(Soviet Union) MVS	
12 September; 06:39:42	(Soviet Union) Luna 2 (Ye-1A №6)	MVS	Heliocentric	Lunar impactor	14 September; 22:02	Successful
12 September; 06:39:42	First probe to impact the surface of the Moon in history. First probe to take detailed photos of the lunar surface.					
17 September; 14:34	(United States) Thor DM-18 Able-II		(United States) Cape Canaveral LC-17A		(United States) US Air Force	
17 September; 14:34	(United States) Transit 1A	US Air Force	Intended: Low Earth	Navigation; Technology	17 September	Launch failure
17 September; 14:34	Third stage malfunctioned.					
18 September; 05:20:07	(United States) Vanguard / Altair	SLV-7 (TV-4BU)	(United States) Cape Canaveral LC-18A		(United States) US Navy	
18 September; 05:20:07	(United States) Vanguard 3 (Magne-Ray Satellite)	NRL	Medium Earth	Scientific	In orbit	Successful
18 September; 05:20:07	Final flight of Vanguard rocket, satellite failed to separate from carrier rocket, otherwise successful, spacecraft operated until 11 December.					
24 September	(United States) Atlas-C Able		(United States) Cape Canaveral LC-14		(United States) US Air Force	
24 September	(United States) Pioneer P-1	NASA	Planned: Selenocentric	Lunar Orbiter	N/A	Destroyed prior to launch
24 September	Destroyed prior to launch.					
← Jan; Feb; Mar; Apr; May; Jun; Jul; Aug; Sep; Oct; Nov; Dec →; === October ===
4 October; 00:43:39	(Soviet Union) Luna (8K72)	I1-8	(Soviet Union) Baikonur Site 1/5		(Soviet Union) MVS	
4 October; 00:43:39	(Soviet Union) Luna 3 (Ye-2A №1)	MVS	High Earth	Lunar flyby	29 April 1960	Successful
4 October; 00:43:39	First probe to fly over the far side of the Moon on a circumlunar trajectory. First pictures of the far side of the Moon.					
13 October; 15:30:04	(United States) Juno II	AM-19A	(United States) Cape Canaveral LC-5		(United States) ABMA	
13 October; 15:30:04	(United States) Explorer 7 (S-1A)	NASA	Low Earth	Scientific	In orbit	Successful
13 October; 15:30:04	Broadcast data until 24 August 1961.					
← Jan; Feb; Mar; Apr; May; Jun; Jul; Aug; Sep; Oct; Nov; Dec →; === November ===
7 November; 20:28:41	(United States) Thor DM-18 Agena-A		(United States) Vandenberg SLC-1W (75-3-4)		(United States) US Air Force	
7 November; 20:28:41	(United States) Discoverer 7 (KH-1 4)	CIA DST	Low Earth	Optical imaging	26 November	Spacecraft failure
7 November; 20:28:41	(United States) SRV 109	CIA DST	Low Earth	Technology		
7 November; 20:28:41	Satellite tumbled out of control.					
20 November; 19:25:24	(United States) Thor DM-18 Agena-A		(United States) Vandenberg SLC-1E (75-3-5)		(United States) US Air Force	
20 November; 19:25:24	(United States) Discoverer 8 (KH-1 5)	CIA DST	Low Earth	Optical imaging	8 March 1960	Launch failure
20 November; 19:25:24	(United States) SRV 107	CIA DST	Low Earth	Technology	8 March 1960	Launch failure
20 November; 19:25:24	Inserted into useless orbit with greater eccentricity than planned.					
26 November; 07:26	(United States) Atlas-D Able		(United States) Cape Canaveral LC-14		(United States) US Air Force	
26 November; 07:26	(United States) Pioneer P-3	NASA	Intended: Selenocentric	Lunar orbiter	+45 seconds	Launch failure
26 November; 07:26	Maiden flight of Atlas-Able. Payload fairing broke up at T+45 seconds, leading to loss of the upper stages and payload. Atlas performed normally.					
← Jan; Feb; Mar; Apr; May; Jun; Jul; Aug; Sep; Oct; Nov; Dec →

== Suborbital flights ==
Date and time (UTC)	Rocket	Flight number	Launch site		LSP	
Date and time (UTC)	Payload (⚀ = CubeSat)	Operator	Orbit	Function	Decay (UTC)	Outcome
Date and time (UTC)	Remarks					
2 July; 06:40	(East Germany) (Soviet Union) R-2		(Soviet Union) Kapustin Yar		(Soviet Union) MVS	
2 July; 06:40		MVS	Suborbital		2 July	Successful
2 July; 06:40	Apogee: 220 kilometres (140 mi)					
7 July; 11:15	(United States) Javelin		(United States) Wallops Island		(United States) US Air Force	
7 July; 11:15		AFSWC	Suborbital	Test flight	7 July	Successful
7 July; 11:15	Apogee: 1,045 kilometres (649 mi)					
10 July; 01:01	(United States) PGM-19 Jupiter		(United States) Cape Canaveral LC-26B		(United States) US Air Force	
10 July; 01:01		US Air Force	Suborbital	Missile test	10 July	Successful
10 July; 01:01	Apogee: 500 kilometres (310 mi)					
10 July; 04:47	(East Germany) (Soviet Union) R-2		(Soviet Union) Kapustin Yar		(Soviet Union) MVS	
10 July; 04:47		MVS	Suborbital		10 July	Successful
10 July; 04:47	Apogee: 100 kilometres (62 mi)					
14 July; 03:40	(East Germany) (Soviet Union) R-2		(Soviet Union) Kapustin Yar		(Soviet Union) MVS	
14 July; 03:40		MVS	Suborbital		14 July	Successful
14 July; 03:40	Apogee: 203 kilometres (126 mi)					
14 July; 17:45	(United States) Nike-Asp		(United States) Point Arguello LC-A		(United States) US Navy	
14 July; 17:45		NASA	Suborbital	Solar	14 July	Successful
14 July; 17:45	Apogee: 200 kilometres (120 mi)					
15 July; 16:59	(United States) UGM-27 Polaris AX		(United States) Cape Canaveral LC-25A		(United States) US Navy	
15 July; 16:59		US Navy	Suborbital	Missile test	15 July	Launch failure
15 July; 16:59	Apogee: 2 kilometres (1.2 mi)					
17 July; 17:40	(United States) Nike-Asp		(United States) Point Arguello LC-A		(United States) US Navy	
17 July; 17:40		US Navy	Suborbital		17 July	Launch failure
17 July; 17:40	Apogee: 10 kilometres (6.2 mi)					
18 July; 18:15	(Soviet Union) R-7 Semyorka		(Soviet Union) Baikonur Site 1/5		(Soviet Union) MVS	
18 July; 18:15		MVS	Suborbital	Missile test	18 July	Successful
18 July; 18:15	Apogee: 1,350 kilometres (840 mi)					
20 July	(Soviet Union) R-11A Zemlya		(Soviet Union) Kapustin Yar		(Soviet Union) AN	
20 July		AN	Suborbital		20 July	Successful
20 July	Apogee: 200 kilometres (120 mi)					
21 July; 02:00	(Soviet Union) R-11A Zemlya		(Soviet Union) Kapustin Yar		(Soviet Union) MVS	
21 July; 02:00		MVS	Suborbital		21 July	Successful
21 July; 02:00	Apogee: 105 kilometres (65 mi)					
21 July; 05:22	(United States) SM-65C Atlas		(United States) Cape Canaveral LC-12		(United States) US Air Force	
21 July; 05:22		US Air Force	Suborbital	Missile test	21 July	Successful
21 July; 05:22	Apogee: 900 kilometres (560 mi)					
21 July; 07:33	(United States) PGM-17 Thor DM-18A		(United States) Cape Canaveral LC-17B		(United States) US Air Force	
21 July; 07:33		US Air Force	Suborbital	Missile test	21 July	Launch failure
21 July; 07:33	Apogee: 1 kilometre (0.62 mi)					
21 July; 14:00	(United States) Aerobee-150 (Hi)		(United States) White Sands LC-35		(United States) US Navy	
21 July; 14:00		NRL	Suborbital		21 July	Successful
21 July; 14:00	Apogee: 197 kilometres (122 mi)					
21 July; 14:00	(Soviet Union) R-11A Zemlya		(Soviet Union) Kapustin Yar		(Soviet Union) MVS	
21 July; 14:00		MVS	Suborbital		21 July	Successful
21 July; 14:00	Apogee: 105 kilometres (65 mi)					
21 July	(East Germany) (Soviet Union) R-2		(Soviet Union) Kapustin Yar		(Soviet Union) MVS	
21 July		MVS	Suborbital		21 July	Successful
21 July	Apogee: 105 kilometres (65 mi)					
21 July	(United States) Javelin		(United States) Wallops Island		(United States) US Air Force	
21 July		AFSWC	Suborbital	Test flight	21 July	Launch failure
21 July	Apogee: 100 kilometres (62 mi)					
22 July; 01:14	(Soviet Union) R-11A Zemlya		(Soviet Union) Kapustin Yar		(Soviet Union) MVS	
22 July; 01:14		MVS	Suborbital		22 July	Successful
22 July; 01:14	Apogee: 211 kilometres (131 mi)					
24 July; 12:47	(United States) PGM-17 Thor DM-18A		(United States) Cape Canaveral LC-18B		(United States) US Air Force	
24 July; 12:47		US Air Force	Suborbital	Missile test	24 July	Successful
24 July; 12:47	Apogee: 520 kilometres (320 mi)					
24 July; 16:34	(United States) Nike-Asp		(United States) Point Arguello LC-A		(United States) US Navy	
24 July; 16:34		US Navy	Suborbital	Solar	24 July	Successful
24 July; 16:34	Apogee: 227 kilometres (141 mi)					
24 July	(Soviet Union) R-12 Dvina		(Soviet Union) Kapustin Yar		(Soviet Union) MVS	
24 July		MVS	Suborbital	Missile test	24 July	Successful
24 July	Apogee: 402 kilometres (250 mi)					
25 July	(Soviet Union) R-12 Dvina		(Soviet Union) Kapustin Yar		(Soviet Union) MVS	
25 July		MVS	Suborbital	Missile test	25 July	Successful
25 July	Apogee: 402 kilometres (250 mi)					
26 July	(Soviet Union) R-12 Dvina		(Soviet Union) Kapustin Yar		(Soviet Union) MVS	
26 July		MVS	Suborbital	Missile test	26 July	Successful
26 July	Apogee: 402 kilometres (250 mi)					
28 July	(Soviet Union) R-12 Dvina		(Soviet Union) Kapustin Yar		(Soviet Union) MVS	
28 July		MVS	Suborbital	Missile test	28 July	Successful
28 July	Apogee: 402 kilometres (250 mi)					
29 July; 04:10	(United States) SM-65D Atlas		(United States) Cape Canaveral LC-11		(United States) US Air Force	
29 July; 04:10		US Air Force	Suborbital	Missile test	29 July	Successful
29 July; 04:10	Apogee: 1,800 kilometres (1,100 mi)					
30 July; 04:00	(Soviet Union) R-7 Semyorka		(Soviet Union) Baikonur Site 1/5		(Soviet Union) MVS	
30 July; 04:00		MVS	Suborbital	Missile test	30 July	Successful
30 July; 04:00	Apogee: 1,350 kilometres (840 mi)					
31 July	(Soviet Union) R-12 Dvina		(Soviet Union) Kapustin Yar		(Soviet Union) MVS	
31 July		MVS	Suborbital	Missile test	31 July	Successful
31 July	Apogee: 402 kilometres (250 mi)					
3 August; 21:41	(United States) PGM-17 Thor DM-18A		(United States) Vandenberg LC-75-1-1		(United Kingdom) Royal Air Force	
3 August; 21:41		Royal Air Force	Suborbital	Missile test	3 August	Successful
3 August; 21:41	Apogee: 520 kilometres (320 mi)					
6 August; 02:48	(United States) PGM-17 Thor DM-18A		(United States) Cape Canaveral LC-17B		(United States) US Air Force	
6 August; 02:48		US Air Force	Suborbital	Missile test	6 August	Successful
6 August; 02:48	Apogee: 520 kilometres (320 mi)					
6 August	(United States) UGM-27 Polaris AX		(United States) Cape Canaveral LC-25A		(United States) US Navy	
6 August		US Navy	Suborbital	Missile test	6 August	Launch failure
6 August	Apogee: 10 kilometres (6.2 mi)					
7 August; 17:05	(United States) Nike-Asp		(United States) Point Arguello LC-A		(United States) US Navy	
7 August; 17:05		US Navy	Suborbital	Solar	7 August	Successful
7 August; 17:05	Apogee: 225 kilometres (140 mi)					
7 August	(Soviet Union) R-12 Dvina		(Soviet Union) Kapustin Yar		(Soviet Union) MVS	
7 August		MVS	Suborbital	Missile test	7 August	Successful
7 August	Apogee: 402 kilometres (250 mi)					
7 August	(United States) Arcon		(United States) Wallops Island		(United States) NASA	
7 August		NASA	Suborbital	Test flight	7 August	Launch failure
7 August	Apogee: 20 kilometres (12 mi)					
7 August	(United States) Arcon		(United States) Wallops Island		(United States) NASA	
7 August		NASA	Suborbital	Test flight	7 August	Launch failure
7 August	Apogee: 50 kilometres (31 mi)					
7 August	(United States) Arcon		(United States) Wallops Island		(United States) NASA	
7 August		NASA	Suborbital	Test flight	7 August	Launch failure
7 August	Apogee: 104 kilometres (65 mi)					
11 August; 18:01	(United States) SM-65D Atlas		(United States) Cape Canaveral LC-13		(United States) US Air Force	
11 August; 18:01		US Air Force	Suborbital	Missile test	11 August	Successful
11 August; 18:01	Apogee: 1,800 kilometres (1,100 mi)					
12 August	(United States) Terrier-ASROC-Cajun		(United States) Point Arguello		(United States) US Navy	
12 August		US Navy	Suborbital		12 August	Launch failure
13 August; 23:14	(Soviet Union) R-7 Semyorka		(Soviet Union) Baikonur Site 1/5		(Soviet Union) MVS	
13 August; 23:14		MVS	Suborbital	Missile test	13 August	Successful
13 August; 23:14	Apogee: 1,350 kilometres (840 mi)					
13 August	(Soviet Union) R-12 Dvina		(Soviet Union) Kapustin Yar		(Soviet Union) MVS	
13 August		MVS	Suborbital	Missile test	13 August	Launch failure
14 August; 09:00	(United States) PGM-17 Thor DM-18A		(United States) Cape Canaveral LC-18B		(United States) US Air Force	
14 August; 09:00		US Air Force	Suborbital	Missile test	14 August	Successful
14 August; 09:00	Apogee: 520 kilometres (320 mi)					
14 August; 16:00	(United States) HGM-25A Titan I		(United States) Cape Canaveral LC-19		(United States) US Air Force	
14 August; 16:00		US Air Force	Suborbital	Missile test	+0 seconds	Launch failure
14 August; 16:00	First all-up test of Titan I, hold-down bolts released prematurely, rocket exploded on launch pad					
14 August; 16:00	(United States) Nike-Asp		(United States) Point Arguello LC-A		(United States) US Navy	
14 August; 16:00		US Navy	Suborbital	Solar	14 August	Successful
14 August; 16:00	Apogee: 237 kilometres (147 mi)					
14 August; 19:30	(United States) UGM-27 Polaris AX		(United States) Cape Canaveral LC-25B		(United States) US Navy	
14 August; 19:30		US Navy	Suborbital	Missile test	14 August	Successful
14 August; 19:30	Apogee: 500 kilometres (310 mi)					
14 August; 19:36:04	(United States) PGM-17 Thor DM-18A		(United States) Vandenberg LC-75-2-6		(United Kingdom) Royal Air Force	
14 August; 19:36:04		Royal Air Force	Suborbital	Missile test	14 August	Launch failure
17 August; 09:18	(United States) Nike-Asp		(United States) Wallops Island		(United States) NASA	
17 August; 09:18		US Navy	Suborbital	Aeronomy	17 August	Successful
17 August; 09:18	Apogee: 236 kilometres (147 mi), released sodium					
19 August; 00:20	(United Kingdom) Skylark-2		(Australia) Woomera LA-2		(United Kingdom) RAE	
19 August; 00:20		UCL	Suborbital	Ionospheric	19 August	Successful
19 August; 00:20	Apogee: 144 kilometres (89 mi)					
19 August; 00:34	(United States) Nike-Asp		(United States) Wallops Island		(United States) NASA	
19 August; 00:34		NASA	Suborbital	Aeronomy	19 August	Launch failure
19 August; 00:34	Apogee: 30 kilometres (19 mi), released sodium					
22 August; 00:45	(United States) Aerobee-150 (Hi)		(United States) White Sands LC-35		(United States) US Air Force	
22 August; 00:45		US Air Force	Suborbital		22 August	Successful
22 August; 00:45	Apogee: 230 kilometres (140 mi)					
22 August; 02:30	(United States) Nike-Asp		(United States) Point Arguello LC-A		(United States) US Navy	
22 August; 02:30		US Navy	Suborbital	Solar	22 August	Successful
22 August; 02:30	Apogee: 200 kilometres (120 mi)					
24 August; 15:33	(United States) SM-65C Atlas		(United States) Cape Canaveral LC-12		(United States) US Air Force	
24 August; 15:33		US Air Force	Suborbital	Missile test	24 August	Successful
24 August; 15:33	Apogee: 1,400 kilometres (870 mi)					
24 August; 22:47	(United States) Nike-Asp		(United States) Point Arguello LC-A		(United States) US Navy	
24 August; 22:47		US Navy	Suborbital		24 August	Successful
24 August; 22:47	Apogee: 200 kilometres (120 mi)					
25 August	(United States) UGM-27 Polaris AX		(United States) Cape Canaveral LC-25A		(United States) US Navy	
25 August		US Navy	Suborbital	Missile test	25 August	Launch failure
25 August	Apogee: 10 kilometres (6.2 mi)					
26 August; 17:35	(United States) Nike-Zeus A		(United States) White Sands LC-38		(United States) US Army	
26 August; 17:35		US Army	Suborbital	Test flight	26 August	Launch failure
26 August	(Soviet Union) R-12 Dvina		(Soviet Union) Kapustin Yar		(Soviet Union) MVS	
26 August		MVS	Suborbital	Missile test	26 August	Successful
26 August	Apogee: 402 kilometres (250 mi)					
27 August; 01:30	(United States) PGM-19 Jupiter		(United States) Cape Canaveral LC-5		(United States) US Air Force	
27 August; 01:30		US Air Force	Suborbital	Missile test	27 August	Successful
27 August; 01:30	Apogee: 500 kilometres (310 mi)					
27 August; 16:57	(United States) UGM-27 Polaris AX		(United States) USNS Observation Island, ETR		(United States) US Navy	
27 August; 16:57		US Navy	Suborbital	Missile test	27 August	Successful
27 August; 16:57	Apogee: 500 kilometres (310 mi)					
28 August; 16:10	(United States) Nike-Asp		(United States) Point Arguello LC-A		(United States) US Navy	
28 August; 16:10		US Navy	Suborbital	Solar	28 August	Successful
28 August; 16:10	Apogee: 214 kilometres (133 mi)					
27 August; 12:30	(United States) PGM-17 Thor DM-18A		(United States) Cape Canaveral LC-17B		(United States) US Air Force	
27 August; 12:30		US Air Force	Suborbital	Missile test	27 August	Successful
27 August; 12:30	Apogee: 520 kilometres (320 mi)					
28 August; 18:45	(United States) Aerobee-150 (Hi)		(United States) White Sands LC-35		(United States) US Air Force	
28 August; 18:45		US Air Force	Suborbital		28 August	Successful
28 August; 18:45	Apogee: 235 kilometres (146 mi)					
28 August	(Soviet Union) R-12 Dvina		(Soviet Union) Kapustin Yar		(Soviet Union) MVS	
28 August		MVS	Suborbital	Missile test	28 August	Successful
28 August	Apogee: 402 kilometres (250 mi)					
31 August; 22:53	(United States) Nike-Asp		(United States) Point Arguello LC-A		(United States) US Navy	
31 August; 22:53	(United States) Sunflare II	US Navy	Suborbital	Solar	31 August	Successful
31 August; 22:53	Apogee: 200 kilometres (120 mi)					
1 September; 01:01	(United States) Nike-Asp		(United States) Point Arguello LC-A		(United States) US Navy	
1 September; 01:01		US Navy	Suborbital	Solar	1 September	Successful
1 September; 01:01	Apogee: 200 kilometres (120 mi)					
1 September; 19:00	(United States) Nike-Asp		(United States) Point Arguello LC-A		(United States) US Navy	
1 September; 19:00		US Navy	Suborbital		1 September	Successful
1 September; 19:00	Apogee: 210 kilometres (130 mi)					
2 September; 00:03	(United States) Nike-Asp		(United States) Point Arguello LC-A		(United States) US Navy	
2 September; 00:03		US Navy	Suborbital	Solar	2 September	Successful
2 September; 00:03	Apogee: 200 kilometres (120 mi)					
2 September	(Soviet Union) R-12 Dvina		(Soviet Union) Kapustin Yar		(Soviet Union) MVS	
2 September		MVS	Suborbital	Missile test	2 September	Launch failure
5 September; 15:27	(Canada) Black Brant I		(Canada) Churchill		(Canada) CARDE	
5 September; 15:27		CARDE	Suborbital	Test flight	5 September	Successful
5 September; 15:27	Apogee: 100 kilometres (62 mi), maiden flight of Black Brant					
5 September	(Soviet Union) R-12 Dvina		(Soviet Union) Kapustin Yar		(Soviet Union) MVS	
5 September		MVS	Suborbital	Missile test	5 September	Successful
5 September	Apogee: 402 kilometres (250 mi)					
8 September; 15:14	(Canada) Black Brant I		(Canada) Churchill		(Canada) CARDE	
8 September; 15:14		CARDE	Suborbital	Test flight	8 September	Successful
8 September; 15:14	Apogee: 130 kilometres (81 mi)					
9 September; 08:19	(United States) SM-65D Atlas		(United States) Cape Canaveral LC-14		(United States) US Air Force	
9 September; 08:19	(United States) Big Joe 1	NASA	Suborbital	Test flight	08:32	Partial launch failure
9 September; 08:19	Apogee: 153 kilometres (95 mi), Boilerplate Mercury test, booster engines failed to separate, spacecraft recovered					
9 September; 17:50:42	(United States) SM-65D Atlas		(United States) Vandenberg LC-576A-2		(United States) SAC	
9 September; 17:50:42		SAC	Suborbital	Missile test	9 September	Successful
9 September; 17:50:42	Apogee: 1,800 kilometres (1,100 mi)					
10 September; 21:48	(Canada) Black Brant I		(Canada) Churchill		(Canada) CARDE	
10 September; 21:48		CARDE	Suborbital	Test flight	10 September	Successful
10 September; 21:48	Apogee: 127 kilometres (79 mi)					
11 September; 19:12	(United States) Aerobee-150 (Hi)		(Canada) Churchill		(United States) NASA	
11 September; 19:12		NASA	Suborbital		11 September	Successful
11 September; 19:12	Apogee: 227 kilometres (141 mi)					
12 September	(United States) PGM-17 Thor DM-18A		(United States) Cape Canaveral LC-18B		(United States) US Air Force	
12 September		US Air Force	Suborbital	Missile test	12 September	Successful
12 September	Apogee: 520 kilometres (320 mi)					
14 September; 17:27	(United States) Aerobee-150 (Hi)		(Canada) Churchill		(United States) NASA	
14 September; 17:27		NASA	Suborbital		14 September	Successful
14 September; 17:27	Apogee: 218 kilometres (135 mi)					
15 September; 21:45	(United States) PGM-19 Jupiter		(United States) Cape Canaveral LC-26B		(United States) US Air Force	
15 September; 21:45	(United States) Bioflight 3	US Air Force	Suborbital	Biological; Missile test	15 September	Launch failure
15 September; 21:45	Apogee: 500 kilometres (310 mi)					
15 September	(Soviet Union) R-12 Dvina		(Soviet Union) Kapustin Yar		(Soviet Union) MVS	
15 September		MVS	Suborbital	Missile test	15 September	Successful
15 September	Apogee: 402 kilometres (250 mi)					
15 September	(United States) Aerobee		(United States) White Sands LC-35		(United States) US Air Force	
15 September		US Air Force	Suborbital	Test flight	15 September	Successful
15 September	Apogee: 200 kilometres (120 mi)					
17 September; 00:12	(United Kingdom) Skylark-2		(Australia) Woomera LA-2		(United Kingdom) RAE	
17 September; 00:12		Birmingham; UCL	Suborbital	Ionospheric; Solar	17 September	Successful
17 September; 00:12	Apogee: 132 kilometres (82 mi)					
17 September; 02:09	(United States) SM-65D Atlas		(United States) Cape Canaveral LC-13		(United States) US Air Force	
17 September; 02:09		US Air Force	Suborbital	Missile test	17 September	Launch failure
17 September; 02:09	Apogee: 1,000 kilometres (620 mi)					
17 September; 18:37	(United States) Aerobee-150 (Hi)		(Canada) Churchill		(United States) NASA	
17 September; 18:37	(United States) DRTE.01	NASA	Suborbital	Ionospheric	17 September	Successful
17 September; 18:37	Apogee: 256 kilometres (159 mi)					
17 September; 21:09	(United States) PGM-17 Thor DM-18A		(United States) Vandenberg LC-75-1-2		(United Kingdom) Royal Air Force	
17 September; 21:09		Royal Air Force	Suborbital	Missile test	17 September	Successful
17 September; 21:09	Apogee: 520 kilometres (320 mi)					
18 September; 16:02	(Soviet Union) R-7 Semyorka		(Soviet Union) Baikonur Site 1/5		(Soviet Union) MVS	
18 September; 16:02		MVS	Suborbital	Missile test	18 September	Successful
18 September; 16:02	Apogee: 1,350 kilometres (840 mi)					
18 September; 16:55	(United States) Nike-Cajun		(United States) Elgin		(United States) US Air Force	
18 September; 16:55		US Air Force	Suborbital	Aeronomy	18 September	Successful
18 September; 16:55	Apogee: 100 kilometres (62 mi)					
20 September; 17:35	(United States) Aerobee-150 (Hi)		(Canada) Churchill		(United States) NASA	
20 September; 17:35	(United States) DRTE.02	NASA	Suborbital	Ionospheric	20 September	Launch failure
20 September; 17:35	Apogee: 100 kilometres (62 mi)					
21 September	(United States) UGM-27 Polaris A1		(United States) Cape Canaveral LC-29A		(United States) US Navy	
21 September		US Navy	Suborbital	Missile test	21 September	Successful
21 September	Apogee: 500 kilometres (310 mi)					
22 September; 18:00	(United States) PGM-17 Thor DM-18A		(United States) Cape Canaveral LC-17B		(United States) US Air Force	
22 September; 18:00		US Air Force	Suborbital	Missile test	22 September	Successful
22 September; 18:00	Apogee: 520 kilometres (320 mi)					
22 September	(United States) Aerobee-100		(United States) White Sands LC-35		(United States) US Air Force	
22 September		US Air Force	Suborbital	Test flight	22 September	Successful
22 September	Apogee: 110 kilometres (68 mi)					
24 September; 00:29	(United Kingdom) Skylark-2		(Australia) Woomera LA-2		(United Kingdom) RAE	
24 September; 00:29		Birmingham; UCL	Suborbital	Ionospheric	24 September	Successful
24 September; 00:29	Apogee: 158 kilometres (98 mi)					
25 September	(Soviet Union) R-12 Dvina		(Soviet Union) Kapustin Yar		(Soviet Union) MVS	
25 September		MVS	Suborbital	Missile test	25 September	Successful
25 September	Apogee: 402 kilometres (250 mi)					
28 September	(Soviet Union) R-12 Dvina		(Soviet Union) Kapustin Yar		(Soviet Union) MVS	
28 September		MVS	Suborbital	Missile test	28 September	Successful
28 September	Apogee: 402 kilometres (250 mi)					
28 September	(United States) UGM-27 Polaris AX		(United States) Cape Canaveral LC-25A		(United States) US Navy	
28 September		US Navy	Suborbital	Missile test	28 September	Launch failure
28 September	Apogee: 10 kilometres (6.2 mi)					
29 September; 10:59	(United States) Nike-Cajun		(United States) Elgin		(United States) US Air Force	
29 September; 10:59		US Air Force	Suborbital	Aeronomy	29 September	Successful
29 September; 10:59	Apogee: 124 kilometres (77 mi)					
30 September; 10:57	(United States) Nike-Cajun		(United States) Elgin		(United States) US Air Force	
30 September; 10:57		US Air Force	Suborbital	Aeronomy	30 September	Successful
30 September; 10:57	Apogee: 122 kilometres (76 mi)					
30 September	(United States) Terrier-Asp		(United States) Point Arguello		(United States) US Navy	
30 September		US Navy	Suborbital		30 September	Successful
30 September	Apogee: 100 kilometres (62 mi)					
1 October; 01:28	(United States) PGM-19 Jupiter		(United States) Cape Canaveral LC-6		(United States) US Air Force	
1 October; 01:28		US Air Force	Suborbital	Missile test	1 October	Successful
1 October; 01:28	Apogee: 500 kilometres (310 mi)					
1 October; 10:49	(United States) Nike-Cajun		(United States) Elgin		(United States) US Air Force	
1 October; 10:49		US Air Force	Suborbital	Aeronomy	1 October	Successful
1 October; 10:49	Apogee: 138 kilometres (86 mi)					
2 October; 11:00	(United States) Nike-Cajun		(United States) Elgin		(United States) US Air Force	
2 October; 11:00		US Air Force	Suborbital	Aeronomy	2 October	Successful
2 October; 11:00	Apogee: 143 kilometres (89 mi)					
2 October; 18:11	(United States) UGM-27 Polaris AX		(United States) Cape Canaveral LC-25A		(United States) US Navy	
2 October; 18:11		US Navy	Suborbital	Missile test	2 October	Launch failure
2 October; 18:11	Apogee: 2 kilometres (1.2 mi)					
3 October; 11:03	(United States) Nike-Cajun		(United States) Elgin		(United States) US Air Force	
3 October; 11:03		US Air Force	Suborbital	Aeronomy	3 October	Successful
3 October; 11:03	Apogee: 122 kilometres (76 mi)					
5 October; 11:01	(United States) Nike-Cajun		(United States) Elgin		(United States) US Air Force	
5 October; 11:01		US Air Force	Suborbital	Aeronomy	5 October	Successful
5 October; 11:01	Apogee: 127 kilometres (79 mi)					
6 October; 05:55	(United States) SM-65D Atlas		(United States) Cape Canaveral LC-11		(United States) US Air Force	
6 October; 05:55		US Air Force	Suborbital	Missile test	6 October	Successful
6 October; 05:55	Apogee: 1,800 kilometres (1,100 mi)					
6 October; 16:41	(United States) PGM-17 Thor DM-18A		(United States) Cape Canaveral LC-18B		(United States) US Air Force	
6 October; 16:41		US Air Force	Suborbital	Missile test	6 October	Successful
6 October; 16:41	Apogee: 520 kilometres (320 mi)					
6 October; 18:26	(United States) PGM-17 Thor DM-18A		(United States) Vandenberg LC-75-2-8		(United Kingdom) Royal Air Force	
6 October; 18:26		Royal Air Force	Suborbital	Missile test	6 October	Successful
6 October; 18:26	Apogee: 520 kilometres (320 mi)					
8 October	(Soviet Union) R-12 Dvina		(Soviet Union) Kapustin Yar		(Soviet Union) MVS	
8 October		MVS	Suborbital	Missile test	8 October	Successful
8 October	Apogee: 402 kilometres (250 mi)					
9 October; 08:40	(United States) Nike-Cajun		(United States) Elgin		(United States) US Air Force	
9 October; 08:40		US Air Force	Suborbital	Aeronomy	9 October	Successful
9 October; 08:40	Apogee: 143 kilometres (89 mi)					
9 October; 11:17	(United States) Nike-Cajun		(United States) Elgin		(United States) US Air Force	
9 October; 11:17		US Air Force	Suborbital	Aeronomy	9 October	Successful
9 October; 11:17	Apogee: 143 kilometres (89 mi)					
9 October	(Soviet Union) R-12 Dvina		(Soviet Union) Kapustin Yar		(Soviet Union) MVS	
9 October		MVS	Suborbital	Missile test	9 October	Launch failure
9 October	(Soviet Union) R-12 Dvina		(Soviet Union) Kapustin Yar		(Soviet Union) MVS	
9 October		MVS	Suborbital	Missile test	9 October	Successful
9 October	Apogee: 402 kilometres (250 mi)					
10 October; 03:10	(United States) SM-65D Atlas		(United States) Cape Canaveral LC-13		(United States) US Air Force	
10 October; 03:10		US Air Force	Suborbital	Missile test	10 October	Successful
10 October; 03:10	Apogee: 1,800 kilometres (1,100 mi)					
10 October; 12:00	(United States) Aerobee AJ10-34		(United States) White Sands LC-35		(United States) US Air Force	
10 October; 12:00		US Air Force	Suborbital	Meteorite research	10 October	Successful
10 October; 12:00	Apogee: 111 kilometres (69 mi)					
12 October; 09:00	(United States) Nike-Cajun		(United States) Elgin		(United States) US Air Force	
12 October; 09:00		US Air Force	Suborbital	Aeronomy	12 October	Successful
12 October; 09:00	Apogee: 123 kilometres (76 mi)					
12 October; 10:12	(United States) Nike-Cajun		(United States) Elgin		(United States) US Air Force	
12 October; 10:12		US Air Force	Suborbital	Aeronomy	12 October	Successful
12 October; 10:12	Apogee: 123 kilometres (76 mi)					
12 October; 18:18	(United States) UGM-27 Polaris A1		(United States) Cape Canaveral LC-29A		(United States) US Navy	
12 October; 18:18		US Navy	Suborbital	Missile test	12 October	Launch failure
12 October; 18:18	Apogee: 10 kilometres (6.2 mi)					
13 October; 11:17	(United States) Nike-Cajun		(United States) Elgin		(United States) US Air Force	
13 October; 11:17		US Air Force	Suborbital	Aeronomy	13 October	Successful
13 October; 11:17	Apogee: 116 kilometres (72 mi)					
13 October	(United States) WS-199B Bold Orion II		(United States) B-47, Cape Canaveral		(United States) US Air Force	
13 October		US Air Force	Suborbital	Missile test	13 October	Successful
13 October	Apogee: 200 kilometres (120 mi)					
14 October; 04:15	(United States) PGM-17 Thor DM-18A		(United States) Cape Canaveral LC-17B		(United States) US Air Force	
14 October; 04:15		US Air Force	Suborbital	Missile test	14 October	Successful
14 October; 04:15	Apogee: 520 kilometres (320 mi)					
15 October; 11:05	(United States) Nike-Cajun		(United States) Elgin		(United States) US Air Force	
15 October; 11:05		US Air Force	Suborbital	Aeronomy	15 October	Successful
15 October; 11:05	Apogee: 122 kilometres (76 mi)					
16 October; 11:17	(United States) Nike-Cajun		(United States) Elgin		(United States) US Air Force	
16 October; 11:17		US Air Force	Suborbital	Aeronomy	16 October	Successful
16 October; 11:17	Apogee: 139 kilometres (86 mi)					
15 October	(Soviet Union) R-11A Zemlya		(Soviet Union) Ostrov Kheysa		(Soviet Union) AN	
15 October		AN	Suborbital		15 October	Successful
15 October	Apogee: 200 kilometres (120 mi)					
15 October	(Soviet Union) R-11A Zemlya		(Soviet Union) Ostrov Kheysa		(Soviet Union) AN	
15 October		AN	Suborbital		15 October	Successful
15 October	Apogee: 200 kilometres (120 mi)					
20 October; 14:25	(United States) Aerobee AJ10-34		(United States) White Sands		(United States) US Air Force	
20 October; 14:25		US Air Force	Suborbital	Ionospheric	20 October	Successful
20 October; 14:25	Apogee: 113 kilometres (70 mi)					
21 October; 22:57	(United States) PGM-17 Thor DM-18A		(United States) Vandenberg LC-75-1-1		(United Kingdom) Royal Air Force	
21 October; 22:57		Royal Air Force	Suborbital	Missile test	21 October	Successful
21 October; 22:57	Apogee: 520 kilometres (320 mi)					
22 October; 03:20	(United States) PGM-19 Jupiter		(United States) Cape Canaveral LC-26A		(United States) US Air Force	
22 October; 03:20		US Air Force	Suborbital	Missile test	22 October	Successful
22 October; 03:20	Apogee: 500 kilometres (310 mi)					
22 October; 17:30	(Soviet Union) R-7 Semyorka		(Soviet Union) Baikonur Site 1/5		(Soviet Union) MVS	
22 October; 17:30		MVS	Suborbital	Missile test	22 October	Successful
22 October; 17:30	Apogee: 1,350 kilometres (840 mi)					
22 October	(France) OPd-56-39-22D (Antares)		(France) CERES		(France) ONERA	
22 October		ONERA	Suborbital	REV test	22 October	Successful
22 October	Apogee: 150 kilometres (93 mi)					
24 October	(Soviet Union) R-12 Dvina		(Soviet Union) Kapustin Yar		(Soviet Union) MVS	
24 October		MVS	Suborbital	Missile test	24 October	Successful
24 October	Apogee: 402 kilometres (250 mi)					
25 October; 17:32	(Soviet Union) R-7 Semyorka		(Soviet Union) Baikonur Site 1/5		(Soviet Union) MVS	
25 October; 17:32		MVS	Suborbital	Missile test	25 October	Successful
25 October; 17:32	Apogee: 1,350 kilometres (840 mi)					
25 October; 17:44	(United States) Aerobee-300		(Canada) Churchill		(United States) US Air Force	
25 October; 17:44		US Air Force/Utah	Suborbital	Ionospheric	25 October	Successful
25 October; 17:44	Apogee: 386 kilometres (240 mi)					
26 October; 17:00	(United States) Nike-Cajun		(Canada) Churchill		(United States) US Air Force	
26 October; 17:00		US Air Force	Suborbital	Ionospheric	26 August	Launch failure
27 October	(Soviet Union) R-12 Dvina		(Soviet Union) Kapustin Yar		(Soviet Union) MVS	
27 October		MVS	Suborbital	Missile test	27 October	Launch failure
28 October; 14:47	(United States) Aerobee-300		(Canada) Churchill		(United States) US Air Force	
28 October; 14:47		US Air Force/Utah	Suborbital	Ionospheric	28 October	Successful
28 October; 14:47	Apogee: 135 kilometres (84 mi)					
28 October; 22:40	(United States) Shotput		(United States) Wallops Island		(United States) NASA	
28 October; 22:40	(United States) Echo E60	NASA/ARPA	Suborbital	Technology	28 October	Successful
28 October; 22:40	Apogee: 400 kilometres (250 mi)					
29 October; 02:12	(United States) PGM-17 Thor DM-18A		(United States) Cape Canaveral LC-18B		(United States) US Air Force	
29 October; 02:12		US Air Force	Suborbital	Missile test	29 October	Successful
29 October; 02:12	Apogee: 520 kilometres (320 mi)					
29 October; 07:20	(United States) SM-65D Atlas		(United States) Cape Canaveral LC-11		(United States) US Air Force	
29 October; 07:20		US Air Force	Suborbital	Missile test	29 October	Successful
29 October; 07:20	Apogee: 1,800 kilometres (1,100 mi)					
30 October; 11:49	(United Kingdom) Black Knight 201		(Australia) Woomera LA-5A		(United Kingdom) RAE	
30 October; 11:49		RAE	Suborbital	REV test	30 October	Successful
30 October; 11:49	Apogee: 732 kilometres (455 mi)					
1 November; 21:23	(Soviet Union) R-7 Semyorka		(Soviet Union) Baikonur Site 1/5		(Soviet Union) MVS	
1 November; 21:23		MVS	Suborbital	Missile test	1 November	Successful
1 November; 21:23	Apogee: 1,350 kilometres (840 mi)					
3 November	(United States) PGM-17 Thor DM-18A		(United States) Cape Canaveral LC-17B		(United States) US Air Force	
3 November		US Air Force	Suborbital	Missile test	3 November	Successful
3 November	Apogee: 520 kilometres (320 mi)					
4 November; 21:37	(United States) SM-65D Atlas		(United States) Cape Canaveral LC-13		(United States) US Air Force	
4 November; 21:37		US Air Force	Suborbital	Missile test	4 November	Successful
4 November; 21:37	Apogee: 1,800 kilometres (1,100 mi)					
5 November; 00:38	(United States) PGM-19 Jupiter		(United States) Cape Canaveral LC-6		(United States) US Air Force	
5 November; 00:38		US Air Force	Suborbital	Missile test	5 November	Successful
5 November; 00:38	Apogee: 500 kilometres (310 mi)					
6 November; 07:25	(United States) Aerobee-150 (Hi)		(United States) White Sands LC-35		(United States) US Navy	
6 November; 07:25		NRL	Suborbital	Aeronomy	6 November	Successful
6 November; 07:25	Apogee: 142 kilometres (88 mi)					
6 November; 16:36	(United States) Aerobee-300		(Canada) Churchill		(United States) US Air Force	
6 November; 16:36		US Air Force/Utah	Suborbital	Ionospheric	6 November	Successful
6 November; 16:36	Apogee: 393 kilometres (244 mi)					
10 November; 12:00	(United States) Strongarm		(United States) Wallops Island		(United States) US Army	
10 November; 12:00		BRL	Suborbital	Ionospheric	10 November	Successful
10 November; 12:00	Apogee: 1,800 kilometres (1,100 mi), maiden flight of Strongarm					
12 November; 19:24	(United States) PGM-17 Thor DM-18A		(United States) Vandenberg LC-75-1-2		(United Kingdom) Royal Air Force	
12 November; 19:24		Royal Air Force	Suborbital	Missile test	12 November	Successful
12 November; 19:24	Apogee: 520 kilometres (320 mi)					
14 November; 22:38	(United States) Aerobee-300		(Canada) Churchill		(United States) US Air Force	
14 November; 22:38		US Air Force	Suborbital	Aeronomy	14 November	Successful
14 November; 22:38	Apogee: 138 kilometres (86 mi)					
18 November; 19:30	(United States) Nike-Asp		(United States) Elgin		(United States) US Air Force	
18 November; 19:30		US Air Force	Suborbital	Ionospheric	18 November	Successful
18 November; 19:30	Apogee: 206 kilometres (128 mi)					
18 November; 22:17	(United States) Nike-Asp		(United States) Wallops Island		(United States) NASA	
18 November; 22:17		NASA	Suborbital	Aeronomy	18 November	Successful
18 November; 22:17	Apogee: 250 kilometres (160 mi), released sodium					
18 November	(United States) Strongarm		(United States) Wallops Island		(United States) US Army	
18 November		BRL	Suborbital	Ionospheric	18 November	Launch failure
18 November	Apogee: 20 kilometres (12 mi)					
19 November; 01:31	(United States) PGM-19 Jupiter		(United States) Cape Canaveral LC-26B		(United States) US Air Force	
19 November; 01:31		US Air Force	Suborbital	Missile test	19 November	Successful
19 November; 01:31	Apogee: 500 kilometres (310 mi)					
19 November; 07:44	(United States) Aerobee-150 (Hi)		(Canada) Churchill		(United States) US Air Force	
19 November; 07:44		US Air Force	Suborbital	Ionospheric	19 November	Launch failure
19 November; 07:44	Apogee: 106 kilometres (66 mi)					
19 November; 10:36	(United States) Nike-Cajun		(Canada) Churchill		(United States) US Air Force	
19 November; 10:36		US Air Force	Suborbital	Aeronomy	19 November	Successful
19 November; 10:36	Apogee: 119 kilometres (74 mi)					
19 November; 10:51	(United States) Nike-Asp		(United States) Wallops Island		(United States) NASA	
19 November; 10:51		NASA	Suborbital	Aeronomy	19 November	Successful
19 November; 10:51	Apogee: 255 kilometres (158 mi), released sodium					
19 November	(United States) PGM-17 Thor DM-18A		(United States) Cape Canaveral LC-17B		(United States) US Air Force	
19 November		US Air Force	Suborbital	Missile test	19 November	Successful
19 November	Apogee: 520 kilometres (320 mi)					
20 November; 10:51	(United States) Nike-Asp		(United States) Wallops Island		(United States) NASA	
20 November; 10:51		NASA	Suborbital	Aeronomy	20 November	Successful
20 November; 10:51	Apogee: 236 kilometres (147 mi), released sodium					
20 November; 17:11	(United States) UGM-27 Polaris A1		(United States) Cape Canaveral LC-29A		(United States) US Navy	
20 November; 17:11		US Navy	Suborbital	Missile test	20 November	Successful
20 November; 17:11	Apogee: 500 kilometres (310 mi)					
20 November; 18:16	(United States) Nike-Cajun		(Canada) Churchill		(United States) US Air Force	
20 November; 18:16		US Air Force	Suborbital	Aeronomy	20 November	Successful
20 November; 18:16	Apogee: 119 kilometres (74 mi)					
20 November; 21:06	(Soviet Union) R-7 Semyorka		(Soviet Union) Baikonur Site 1/5		(Soviet Union) MVS	
20 November; 21:06		MVS	Suborbital	Missile test	20 November	Successful
20 November; 21:06	Apogee: 1,350 kilometres (840 mi)					
22 November; 18:35	(United States) Aerobee-300		(Canada) Churchill		(United States) US Air Force	
22 November; 18:35		US Air Force/Utah	Suborbital	Ionospheric	22 November	Launch failure
22 November; 18:35	Apogee: 35 kilometres (22 mi)					
24 November; 19:48	(United States) SM-65D Atlas		(United States) Cape Canaveral LC-13		(United States) US Air Force	
24 November; 19:48		US Air Force	Suborbital	Missile test	24 November	Successful
24 November; 19:48	Apogee: 1,800 kilometres (1,100 mi)					
27 November; 01:12:33	(Soviet Union) R-7 Semyorka		(Soviet Union) Baikonur Site 1/5		(Soviet Union) MVS	
27 November; 01:12:33		MVS	Suborbital	Missile test	27 November	Successful
27 November; 01:12:33	Apogee: 1,350 kilometres (840 mi)					
30 November; 09:58	(United States) Aerobee		(United States) White Sands		(United States) US Navy	
30 November; 09:58		NRL	Suborbital	UV Astronomy	30 November	Successful
30 November; 09:58	Apogee: 140 kilometres (87 mi)					
30 November; 10:16	(United Kingdom) Skylark-2		(Australia) Woomera LA-2		(United Kingdom) RAE	
30 November; 10:16		Queen's	Suborbital	Aeronomy	30 November	Successful
30 November; 10:16	Apogee: 151 kilometres (94 mi), released sodium					
30 November; 12:35	(United Kingdom) Skylark-2		(Australia) Woomera LA-2		(United Kingdom) RAE	
30 November; 12:35		UCL	Suborbital	Aeronomy	30 November	Successful
30 November; 12:35	Apogee: 163 kilometres (101 mi)					
30 November	(Soviet Union) R-12 Dvina		(Soviet Union) Kapustin Yar		(Soviet Union) MVS	
30 November		MVS	Suborbital	Missile test	30 November	Successful
30 November	Apogee: 402 kilometres (250 mi)					
November	(Soviet Union) R-13		(Soviet Union) Project 611 submarine		(Soviet Union) VMF	
November		VMF	Suborbital	Missile test		Successful
November	Apogee: 150 kilometres (93 mi)					
1 December; 11:36	(United Kingdom) Skylark-2		(Australia) Woomera LA-2		(United Kingdom) RAE	
1 December; 11:36		UCL; Birmingham	Suborbital	Aeronomy	1 December	Successful
1 December; 11:36	Apogee: 159 kilometres (99 mi)					
1 December; 17:00	(United States) PGM-17 Thor DM-18A		(United States) Cape Canaveral LC-18B		(United States) US Air Force	
1 December; 17:00		US Air Force	Suborbital	Missile test	1 December	Successful
1 December; 17:00	Apogee: 520 kilometres (320 mi)					
1 December	(United States) Trailblazer 1		(United States) Wallops Island		(United States) NASA	
1 December		NASA	Suborbital	REV test	1 December	Successful
1 December	Apogee: 260 kilometres (160 mi)					
2 December; 05:29	(United States) PGM-17 Thor DM-18A		(United States) Vandenberg LC-75-1-2		(United Kingdom) Royal Air Force	
2 December; 05:29		Royal Air Force	Suborbital	Missile test	2 December	Launch failure
3 December	(Soviet Union) R-11A Zemlya		(Soviet Union) Ostrov Kheysa		(Soviet Union) AN	
3 December		AN	Suborbital		3 December	Successful
3 December	Apogee: 200 kilometres (120 mi)					
3 December	(Soviet Union) R-11A Zemlya		(Soviet Union) Ostrov Kheysa		(Soviet Union) AN	
3 December		AN	Suborbital		3 December	Successful
3 December	Apogee: 200 kilometres (120 mi)					
12 December; 17:11	(United States) HGM-25A Titan I		(United States) Cape Canaveral LC-16		(United States) US Air Force	
12 December; 17:11		US Air Force	Suborbital	Missile test	+0 seconds	Launch failure
12 December; 17:11	Vibrations from ignition erroneously triggered self-destruct system whilst rocket was still on pad					
17 December; 20:13	(United States) UGM-27 Polaris A1		(United States) Cape Canaveral LC-29A		(United States) US Navy	
17 December; 20:13		US Navy	Suborbital	Missile test	7 December	Successful
17 December; 20:13	Apogee: 500 kilometres (310 mi)					
9 December; 00:10	(United States) SM-65D Atlas		(United States) Cape Canaveral LC-13		(United States) US Air Force	
9 December; 00:10		US Air Force	Suborbital	Missile test	9 December	Successful
9 December; 00:10	Apogee: 1,800 kilometres (1,100 mi)					
10 December; 00:08	(United States) PGM-19 Jupiter		(United States) Cape Canaveral LC-6		(United States) US Air Force	
10 December; 00:08		US Air Force	Suborbital	Missile test	10 December	Successful
10 December; 00:08	Apogee: 500 kilometres (310 mi)					
15 December; 02:14	(United States) PGM-17 Thor DM-18A		(United States) Vandenberg LC-75-1-1		(United Kingdom) Royal Air Force	
15 December; 02:14		Royal Air Force	Suborbital	Missile test	15 December	Launch failure
15 December	(France) OPd-56-39-22D (Antares)		(France) CERES		(France) ONERA	
15 December		ONERA	Suborbital	REV test	15 December	Successful
15 December	Apogee: 150 kilometres (93 mi)					
16 December; 04:50	(United States) UGM-27 Polaris A1		(United States) Cape Canaveral LC-29A		(United States) US Navy	
16 December; 04:50		US Navy	Suborbital	Missile test	16 December	Launch failure
16 December; 04:50	Apogee: 100 kilometres (62 mi)					
16 December	(Soviet Union) R-12 Dvina		(Soviet Union) Kapustin Yar		(Soviet Union) MVS	
16 December		MVS	Suborbital	Missile test	16 December	Successful
16 December	Apogee: 402 kilometres (250 mi)					
16 December	(United States) Nike-Zeus A		(United States) White Sands LC-38		(United States) US Army	
16 December		US Army	Suborbital	Test flight	16 December	Launch failure
16 December	Apogee: 10 kilometres (6.2 mi)					
17 December; 00:03	(United States) PGM-19 Jupiter		(United States) Cape Canaveral LC-26B		(United States) US Air Force	
17 December; 00:03		US Air Force	Suborbital	Missile test	17 December	Successful
17 December; 00:03	Apogee: 500 kilometres (310 mi)					
17 December	(United States) PGM-17 Thor DM-18A		(United States) Cape Canaveral LC-17B		(United States) US Air Force	
17 December		US Air Force	Suborbital	Missile test	17 December	Successful
17 December	Apogee: 520 kilometres (320 mi)					
18 December	(Soviet Union) R-12 Dvina		(Soviet Union) Kapustin Yar		(Soviet Union) MVS	
18 December		MVS	Suborbital	Missile test	18 December	Successful
18 December	Apogee: 402 kilometres (250 mi)					
19 December; 00:48	(United States) SM-65D Atlas		(United States) Cape Canaveral LC-13		(United States) US Air Force	
19 December; 00:48		US Air Force	Suborbital	Missile test	19 December	Successful
19 December; 00:48	Apogee: 1,800 kilometres (1,100 mi)					
21 December	(Soviet Union) R-12 Dvina		(Soviet Union) Kapustin Yar		(Soviet Union) MVS	
21 December		MVS	Suborbital	Missile test	21 December	Successful
21 December	Apogee: 402 kilometres (250 mi)					
22 December; 07:56	(United States) Javelin		(United States) Wallops Island		(United States) NASA	
22 December; 07:56		NASA	Suborbital	Test flight	22 December	Successful
22 December; 07:56	Apogee: 901 kilometres (560 mi)					
23 December; 19:05	(Soviet Union) R-7A Semyorka		(Soviet Union) Baikonur Site 1/5		(Soviet Union) MVS	
23 December; 19:05		MVS	Suborbital	Missile test	23 December	Successful
23 December; 19:05	Apogee: 1,350 kilometres (840 mi)					
23 December	(United States) UGM-27 Polaris A1		(United States) Cape Canaveral LC-25B		(United States) US Navy	
23 December		US Navy	Suborbital	Missile test	23 December	Launch failure
23 December	Apogee: 1 kilometre (0.62 mi)					
26 December	(Soviet Union) R-5A Pobeda		(Soviet Union) Chelkar		(Soviet Union) RVSN	
26 December		RVSN	Suborbital	Target	26 December	Successful
26 December	Apogee: 500 kilometres (310 mi)					
27 December	(Soviet Union) R-12 Dvina		(Soviet Union) Kapustin Yar		(Soviet Union) MVS	
27 December		MVS	Suborbital	Missile test	27 December	Successful
27 December	Apogee: 402 kilometres (250 mi)					
28 December	(Soviet Union) R-12 Dvina		(Soviet Union) Kapustin Yar		(Soviet Union) MVS	
28 December		MVS	Suborbital	Missile test	28 December	Successful
28 December	Apogee: 402 kilometres (250 mi)					
December	(Soviet Union) R-5A Pobeda		(Soviet Union) Chelkar		(Soviet Union) RVSN	
December		RVSN	Suborbital	Target	December	Successful
December	Apogee: 500 kilometres (310 mi)					
Unknown	(Soviet Union) R-11FM Zemlya		(Soviet Union) B-67, Beloye More		(Soviet Union) VMF	
Unknown		VMF	Suborbital	Missile test		Launch failure
Unknown	(United States) ALSOR		(United States) F-104, Edwards		(United States) NASA	
Unknown		NASA	Suborbital	Test flight		Successful
Unknown	Apogee: 117 kilometres (73 mi)					
