= Discoverer 2 =

American reconnaissance satellite

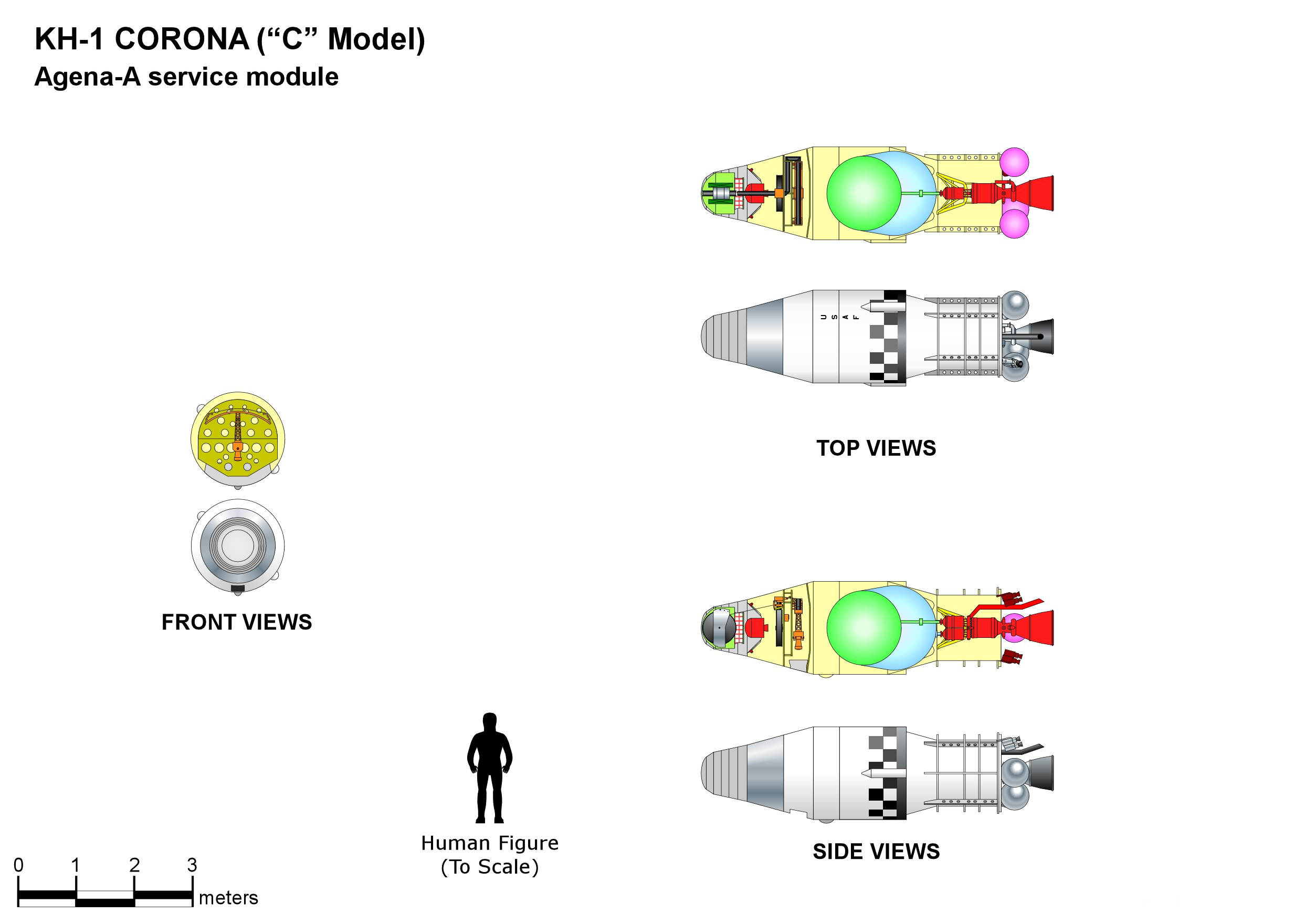
- Mission type: Optical reconnaissance
- Operator: US Air Force / NRO
- Harvard designation: 1959 GAM
- COSPAR ID: 1959-003A
- SATCAT no.: S00014
- Mission duration: 1 day

Spacecraft properties
- Spacecraft type: CORONA Test Vehicle
- Bus: Agena-A
- Manufacturer: Lockheed
- Launch mass: 784 kilograms (1,728 lb) after orbital insertion

Start of mission
- Launch date: 13 April 1959 21:18:39 GMT
- Rocket: Thor DM-21 Agena-A (Thor 170)
- Launch site: Vandenberg LC 75-3-4

End of mission
- Last contact: 14 April 1959
- Decay date: 26 April 1959
- Landing date: 13 April 1959 (SRV)
- Landing site: Over Spitzbergen (SRV)

Orbital parameters
- Reference system: Geocentric
- Regime: Low Earth
- Eccentricity: 0.00801
- Perigee altitude: 239 kilometers (149 mi)
- Apogee altitude: 346 kilometers (215 mi)
- Inclination: 89.9°
- Period: 90.40 minutes
- Epoch: 13 April 1959 21:21:00

Discoverer 2 was an American optical reconnaissance satellite launched on 13 April 1959 at 21:18:39 GMT, the second of three test flights of the CORONA KH-1 spy satellite series. Discoverer 2 was the first satellite to be stabilized in orbit in all three axes and to be maneuvered on command from the ground. Though it carried no film and thus conducted no surveillance, Discoverer 2 was both the first satellite equipped with a reentry capsule and the first to return a payload from orbit. A timing error caused the reentry capsule to land near the island of Spitzbergen, Norway, rather than Hawaii. A joint US-Norway recovery operation was mounted, but was unsuccessful, and there was fear that the capsule ended in the possession of the Soviet Union. Such claims have never been verified. The flight, loss, and search for Discoverer 2 were the inspiration for the book and film Ice Station Zebra.

== Background ==
"Discoverer" was the civilian designation and cover for the CORONA satellite photo-reconnaissance series of satellites managed by the Defense Advanced Research Projects Agency (DARPA) of the Department of Defense and the United States Air Force. The primary goal of the satellites was to replace the U-2 spyplane in surveilling the Sino-Soviet Bloc, determining the disposition and speed of production of Soviet missile and long-range bomber assets. The Corona program was also used to produce maps and charts for the Department of Defense and other United States government mapping programs.

The first series of CORONA satellites were the Keyhole 1 (KH-1) satellites, based on the Agena-A upper stage, which not only offered housing, but whose engine provided attitude control in orbit. The KH-1 payload included the C (for CORONA) single, vertical-looking, panoramic camera that scanned back and forth, exposing its film at a right angle to the line of flight. The camera, built by Fairchild Camera and Instrument with a f/5.0 aperture and 61 centimetres (24 in) focal length, had a ground resolution of 12.9 metres (42 ft). Film was returned from orbit by a single General Electric Satellite Return Vehicle (SRV) constructed by General Electric. The SRV was equipped with an onboard small solid-fuel retro motor to deorbit at the end of the mission. Recovery of the capsule was done in mid-air by a specially equipped aircraft.

Discoverer 2 was the second in a series of three camera-less test flights preceding operational KH-1 flights. Its immediate predecessor, Discoverer 1, which carried neither camera nor film capsule, was launched 28 February 1959 after a failed attempt on 21 January 1959.

== Spacecraft ==
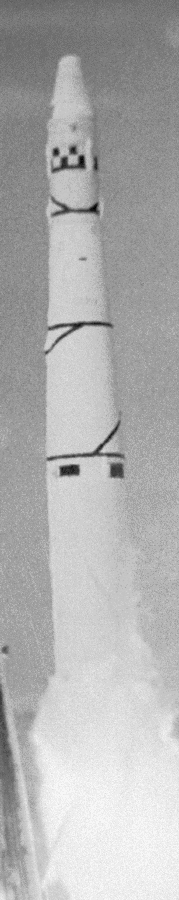
Thor-Agena A with Discoverer 2, 13 April 1959

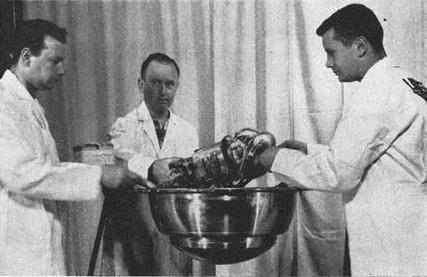
Discoverer 2 environmental chamber inserted into recovery capsule

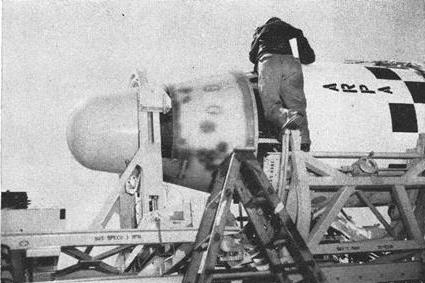
Discoverer 2 nosecone attachment

The battery-powered Discoverer 2 was a cylindrical satellite 1.5 metres (4 ft 11 in) in diameter, 5.85 metres (19.2 ft) long and had a mass after second stage separation, including propellants, of roughly 3,800 kilograms (8,400 lb). After orbital insertion, the satellite and SRV together massed 784 kilograms (1,728 lb).

Instead of a camera and film, Discoverer 2's recovery package included cosmic-ray film packs to determine the intensity and composition of cosmic radiation. This emulsion experiment comprised two groups of films arranged horizontally and vertically to measure the intensity and direction of cosmic radiation and to distinguish among electrons, protons, and heavier charged particles. A metallic Bismuth detector was designed to register induced changes in its sensors from which changes in neutral density could be derived to prevent overexposure in later, photographic missions.

In addition, the spacecraft carried test life support equipment and a "mechanical mouse", a small biomedical payload.

The capsule was designed to be recovered by a specially equipped aircraft during parachute descent, but was also designed to float to permit recovery from the ocean. The main spacecraft contained a telemetry transmitter and a tracking beacon. The telemetry could transmit over 100 measurements of the spacecraft performance, including 28 environmental, 34 guidance and control, 18 second stage performance, 15 communications, and 9 reentry capsule parameters. Electrical power for all instruments was provided by nickel-cadmium batteries. Orientation was provided by a cold nitrogen gas jet-stream system, a scanner for pitch attitude, and an inertial reference package for yaw and roll data.

== Mission ==
Launched on 13 April 1959 at 21:18:39 GMT from Vandenberg LC 75-3-4 into a 239 kilometres (149 mi) x 346 kilometres (215 mi) polar orbit by a Thor-Agena A booster, Discoverer 2 was three-axis stabilized and was commanded from the ground. After 17 orbits, on 14 April 1959, a reentry vehicle was ejected. The reentry vehicle separated into two sections, one consisting of the protection equipment, retrorocket and main structure and the other the reentry capsule. It was planned that the capsule would reenter over the vicinity of Hawaii for recovery, but a timer programming error lead to premature capsule ejection and reentry near the Norwegian island of Spitsbergen, whose residents observed both the SRV's fiery descent, as well as its colorful parachute.

Though Norway was a Western ally and a member of NATO, the Soviet Union, which shared a border with the Scandinavian country, had a lease to operate several mining facilities on the island. The Air Force was thus vague when it announced that the Hawaiian capsule recovery had been canceled and that, instead, the SRV would be picked up somewhere in "the arctic."

With the aid of Norwegian troops, the Air Force mounted an intensive search for the SRV, but was unable to find it, and the search was called off on April 22. At least one post-action memo reported evidence that Discoverer 2's capsule had fallen into the possession of the Soviet Union — ski tracks near the impact zone — which could have provided limited intelligence to the Soviet government. This memo has been disputed, and the fate of Discovery 2's SRV remained unknown as of 1998. The incident became the basis for the book and movie Ice Station Zebra.

Though the SRV recovery failed, Discoverer 2 was the first satellite to be stabilized in orbit in all three axes, to be maneuvered on command from the ground, to separate a reentry vehicle on command, and to send its reentry vehicle back to Earth. The main instrumentation payload remained in orbit and carried out vehicular performance and communications tests, successfully gathering data on propulsion, communications, orbital performance, and stabilization. All equipment functioned as programmed except the timing device. Satellite telemetry functioned until April 14, 1959, and the main tracking beacon functioned until April 21, 1959. The satellite bus reentered on 26 April 1959.

== Legacy ==
CORONA began operational flights on 25 Jun 1959 with the launch of Discoverer 4 and achieved its first fully successful flight with the mission of Discoverer 14, launched on August 18, 1960. The program ultimately comprised 145 flights in eight satellite series, the last mission launching on 25 May 1972. CORONA was declassified in 1995, and a formal acknowledgement of the existence of United States reconnaissance programs, past and present, was issued in September 1996.
