= 1958 in spaceflight =

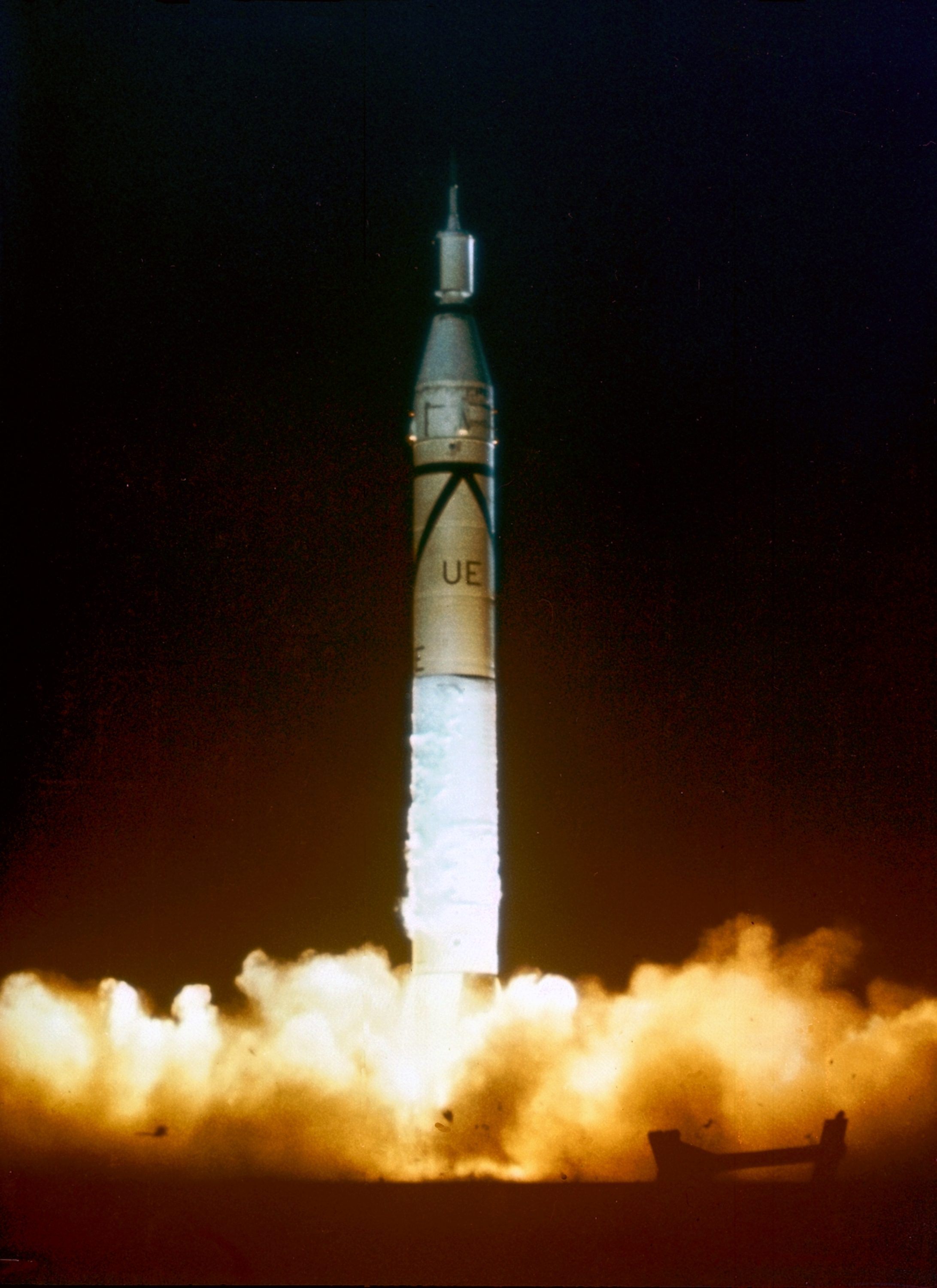
- A Juno I launches the first American satellite, Explorer 1

Orbital launches
- First: 1 February
- Last: 18 December
- Total: 28
- Successes: 6
- Failures: 20
- Partial failures: 2
- Catalogued: 8

National firsts
- Spaceflight: Canada
- Satellite: United States
- Orbital launch: United States

Rockets
- Maiden flights: Juno I Sputnik 8A91; Pilot; Thor-Able; Luna; Juno II; Atlas B
- Retirements: Sputnik 8A91; Pilot; Juno I

1958 in spaceflight

Explorer 1 was the first American satellite to reach orbit on 31 January 1958.

== Orbital launch statistics ==
=== By country ===
Country	Launches	Successes	Failures	Partial failures
Soviet Union	5	1	4	0
United States	23	5 (Note: First successful orbital launch)	16	2

=== By rocket ===
==== By type and configuration ====
Rocket	Country	Type	Family	Launches	Successes	Failures	Partial failures	Remarks
Atlas B	United States	SM-65 Atlas	Atlas	1	1	0	0	Maiden flight, only orbital launch
Juno I	United States	Jupiter-C	Redstone	6	3	3	0	Maiden flight
Juno II	United States	Juno	Jupiter	1	0	0	1	Maiden flight
Luna	Soviet Union	Vostok	R-7	3	0	3	0	Maiden flight
Pilot II	United States	Pilot	NOTS-EV	6	0	6	0	Only flights
Sputnik 8A91	Soviet Union	Sputnik	R-7	2	1	1	0	Only flights
Thor DM-18 Able-I	United States	Thor-Able	Thor	3	0	2	1	Maiden flight
Vanguard	United States	Vanguard	Viking	6	1	5	0	

==== By family ====
Family	Country	Launches	Successes	Failures	Partial failures	Remarks
Atlas	United States	1	1	0	0	First orbital launch
Redstone	United States	6	3	3	0	First orbital launch
Jupiter	United States	1	0	0	1	Maiden flight
NOTS-EV	United States	6	0	6	0	Only orbital launches
R-7	Soviet Union	5	1	4	0	
Thor	United States	3	0	2	1	Maiden flight
Viking	United States	6	1	5	0	

=== By launch site ===
Site	Country	Launches	Successes	Failures	Partial failures	Remarks
Baikonur	Soviet Union	5	1	4	0	
Cape Canaveral	United States	17	5	10	2	
Point Mugu	United States	6	0	6	0	

=== By orbit ===
Orbital regime	Launches	Successes	Failures	Accidentally achieved	Remarks
Catalogued suborbital	N/A	N/A	N/A	2	Pioneer 1 and Pioneer 3 went more than 100000 km on their way to the Moon but were ultimately suborbital due to insufficient velocity.
Low Earth	4	2	2	0	
Medium Earth	17	4	13	0	
Heliocentric	7	0	7	0	

== See also ==
- Timeline of spaceflight
