= Discoverer 4 =

American reconnaissance satellite

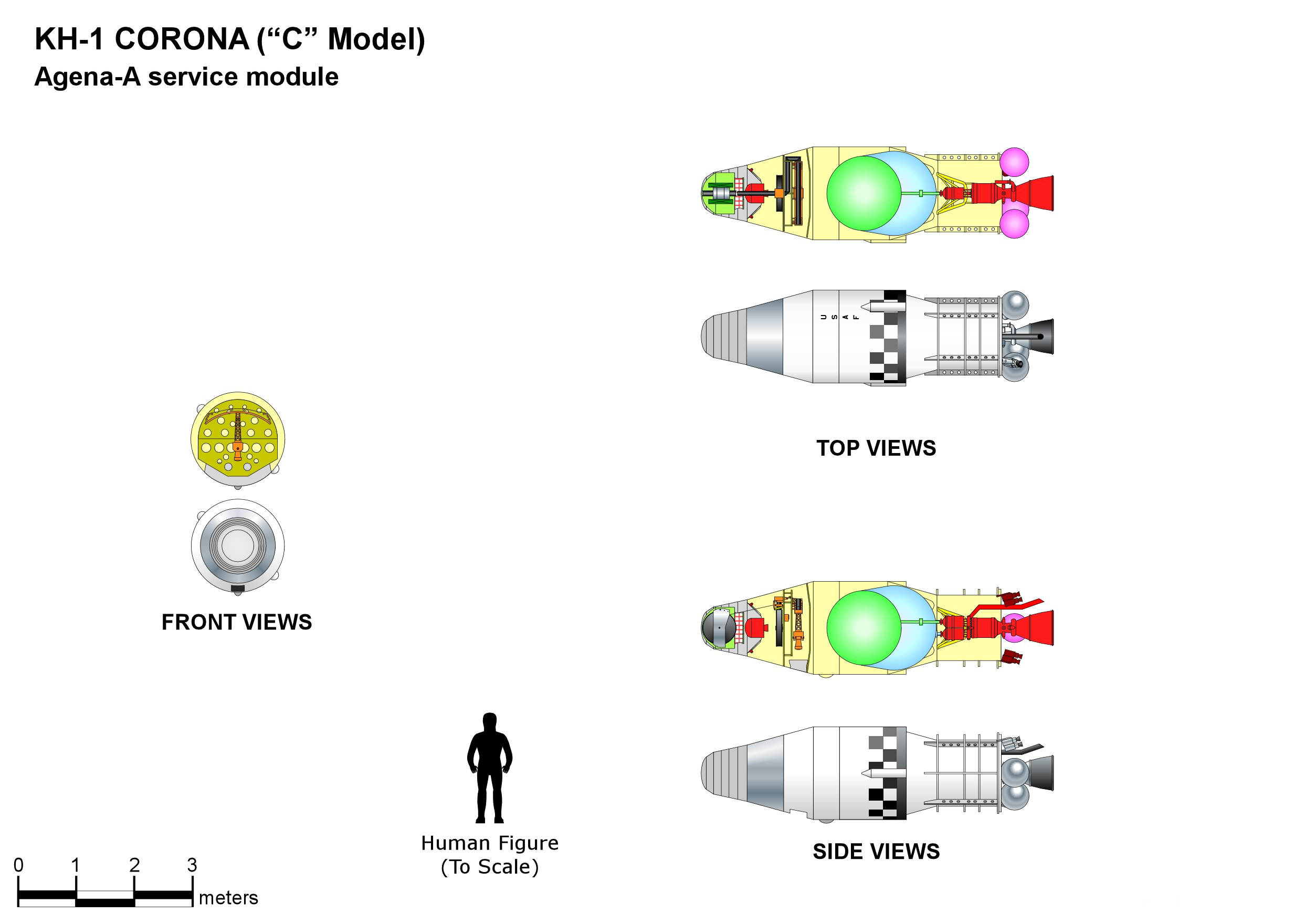
- Mission type: Optical reconnaissance
- Operator: US Air Force / NRO
- Harvard designation: 1959-U01
- SATCAT no.: F00068

Spacecraft properties
- Spacecraft type: CORONA KH-1
- Bus: Agena-A
- Manufacturer: Lockheed
- Launch mass: 870 kilograms (1,920 lb) after orbit insertion

Start of mission
- Launch date: 25 Jun 1959 22:47:45 GMT
- Rocket: Thor DM-21 Agena-A (Thor 179)
- Launch site: Vandenberg LC 75-3-5

Discoverer 4, also known as KH-1 1 or Corona 9001, was an American optical reconnaissance satellite launched on 25 Jun 1959 at 22:47:45 GMT, the first of ten operational flights of the Corona KH-1 spy satellite series, and the first satellite to be equipped for photo surveillance. The satellite was not successfully orbited. Its loss spurred improvements of its rocket booster to ensure the success of subsequent missions.

== Background ==
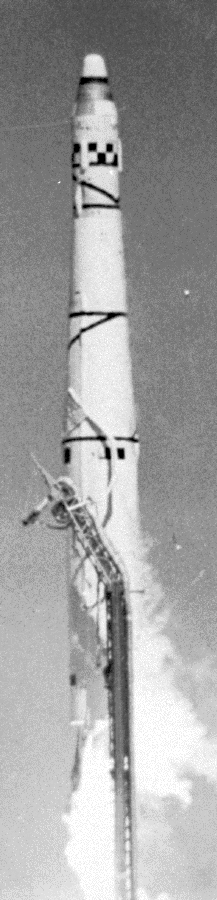
Thor Agena A with Discoverer 4, 25 June 1959.gif

"Discoverer" was the civilian designation and cover for the Corona satellite photo-reconnaissance series of satellites managed by the Advanced Research Projects Agency of the Department of Defense and the U.S. Air Force. The primary goal of the satellites was to replace the U-2 spyplane in surveilling the Sino-Soviet Bloc, determining the disposition and speed of production of Soviet missiles and long-range bombers assess. The Corona program was also used to produce maps and charts for the Department of Defense and other US government mapping programs.

The first series of Corona satellites were the Keyhole 1 (KH-1) satellites based on the Agena-A upper stage, which not only offered housing but whose engine provided attitude control in orbit. The KH-1 payload included the C (for Corona) single, vertical-looking, panoramic camera that scanned back and forth, exposing its film at a right angle to the line of flight. The camera, built by Fairchild Camera and Instrument with a f/5.0 aperture and 61 centimetres (24 in) focal length, had a ground resolution of 12.9 metres (42 ft). Film was returned from orbit by a single General Electric Satellite Return Vehicle (SRV) constructed by General Electric. The SRV was equipped with an onboard small solid-fuel retro motor to deorbit at the end of the mission. Recovery of the capsule was done in mid-air by a specially equipped aircraft.

Discoverer 4 was preceded by three Discoverer test flights whose satellites carried no cameras.

== Spacecraft ==
The battery-powered Discoverer 4 was composed of two sections: the satellite proper and the SRV. Together, they massed (870 kilograms (1,920 lb)) after orbit insertion. It was the first Discoverer equipped with the C camera and the first satellite built for photo surveillance.

== Mission ==
Launched 25 Jun 1959 22:47:45 GMT from Vandenberg LC 75-3-5 by a Thor-Agena rocket, the satellite was lost when its carrying Agena failed to reach orbit.

== Legacy ==
As a result of the loss of Discoverers 3 and 4 during launch, the Air Force Ballistic Missile Division (BMD) halted flights until the Agena failures could be evaluated. In consultation with Space Technology Laboratories, BMD slightly altered the Agena's propulsion, control, and computer systems. The fuel system of the Thor first stage was also altered. These changes ensured the successful launch of Discoverer 5 in August 1959.

CORONA achieved its first fully successful operational flight with the mission of Discoverer 14, launched on August 18, 1960. The program ultimately comprised 145 flights in eight satellite series, the last mission launching on 25 May 1972. CORONA was declassified in 1995, and a formal acknowledgement of the existence of US reconnaissance programs, past and present, was issued in September 1996.
