= 1960 in spaceflight =

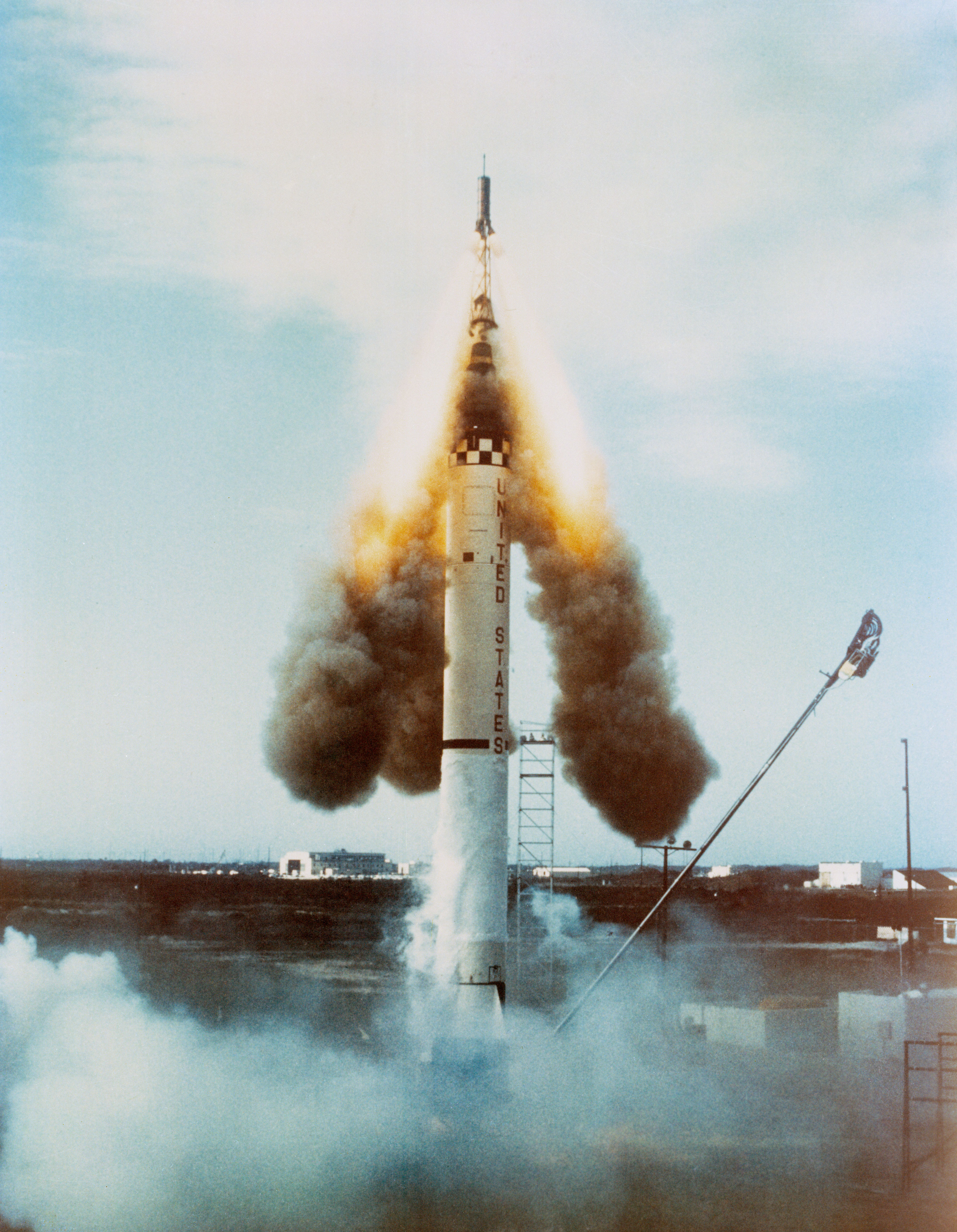
- The launch escape system fires following the failed launch of Mercury-Redstone 1

Orbital launches
- First: 4 February
- Last: 22 December
- Total: 38
- Successes: 19
- Failures: 19
- Partial failures: 0
- Catalogued: 19

National firsts
- Spaceflight: Japan; China

Rockets
- Maiden flights: Atlas-Agena; Molniya; Scout X-1; Thor DM-18 Able-IV; Thor DM-21 Ablestar; Thor DM-21 Agena-B; Thor DM-19 Delta; Vostok-L; Vostok-K
- Retirements: Atlas-Able; Luna; Thor-Able; Thor DM-18 Agena-A; Vostok-L

1960 in spaceflight featured a majority of launches conducted by the United States, with the Soviet Union launching less than a fourth of flights that year. The majority of flights this year were sub-orbital.

1960 in spaceflight

== Orbital launch statistics ==
=== By country ===
Country	Launches	Successes	Failures	Partial failures
Soviet Union	9	3	6	0
United States	29	16	13	0
World	38	19	19	0

=== By rocket ===
Rocket	Country	Family	Launches	Successes	Failures	Partial failures	Remarks
Atlas-Able	United States	Atlas	2	0	2	0	Retired
Atlas LV-3A Agena-A	United States	Atlas	3	1	2	0	Maiden flight
Juno II	United States	Jupiter	2	1	1	0	
Luna 8K72	Soviet Union	R-7	2	0	2	0	Retired
Molniya 8K78	Soviet Union	R-7	2	0	2	0	Maiden flight
Scout X-1	United States	Scout	1	0	1	0	Maiden flight
Thor DM-18 Able-II	United States	Thor	1	1	0	0	Retired
Thor DM-18 Able-IV	United States	Thor	1	1	0	0	Only flight
Thor DM-21 Ablestar	United States	Thor	5	3	2	0	Maiden flight
Thor DM-18 Agena-A	United States	Thor	7	4	3	0	Retired
Thor DM-21 Agena-B	United States	Thor	4	3	1	0	Maiden flight
Thor DM-19 Delta	United States	Thor	3	2	1	0	Maiden flight
Vostok-L 8K72	Soviet Union	R-7	4	3	1	0	Only flights
Vostok-K 8K72K	Soviet Union	R-7	1	0	1	0	Maiden flight

=== By family ===
Rocket	Country	Launches	Successes	Failures	Partial failures	Remarks
Atlas	United States	5	1	4	0	
Jupiter	United States	2	1	1	0	
R7	Soviet Union	9	3	6	0	
Scout	United States	1	0	1	0	
Thor	United States	21	14	7	0	

=== By orbit ===
Orbital regime	Launches	Successes	Failures	Accidentally Achieved	Remarks
Low Earth	26	16	10	0	
Medium Earth	4	2	2	0	
High Earth	1	0	1	0	Including Highly elliptical orbits
Heliocentric	7	1	6	0	
