= 1960 in spaceflight (September–December) =

This is a list of spaceflights launched between September and December 1960. For launches between January and April, see 1960 in spaceflight (January–April), for launches between May and August, see 1960 in spaceflight (May–August). For an overview of the whole year, see 1960 in spaceflight.

== Orbital launches ==
- ← Jan
- Feb
- Mar
- Apr
- May
- Jun
- Jul
- Aug
- Sep
- Oct
- Nov
- Dec →

Date and time (UTC)	Rocket	Flight number	Launch site		LSP	
Date and time (UTC)	Payload (⚀ = CubeSat)	Operator	Orbit	Function	Decay (UTC)	Outcome
Date and time (UTC)	Remarks					
=== September ===
13 September; 22:14	(United States) Thor DM-18 Agena-A		(United States) Vandenberg LC-75-3-5		(United States) US Air Force	
13 September; 22:14	(United States) Discoverer 15 (KH-1 10/9010)	CIA DST	Low Earth (Polar)	Optical imaging	18 October	Successful
13 September; 22:14	(United States) SRV 106	CIA DST	Intended: Low Earth (Polar)	Film return	16 September	Spacecraft failure
13 September; 22:14	Mid-air recovery unsuccessful, capsule sank prior to recovery from sea.					
25 September; 15:13	(United States) Atlas-D Able		(United States) Cape Canaveral LC-12		(United States) US Air Force	
25 September; 15:13	(United States) Pioneer P-30 (Able VA)	US Air Force	Intended: Selenocentric	Lunar probe	25 September	Launch failure
25 September; 15:13	Second stage exploded during ascent.					
← Jan; Feb; Mar; Apr; May; Jun; Jul; Aug; Sep; Oct; Nov; Dec →; === October ===
4 October; 17:50	(United States) Thor DM-21 Ablestar		(United States) Cape Canaveral LC-17B		(United States) US Air Force	
4 October; 17:50	(United States) Courier 1B	US Army	Low Earth	Communication	In orbit	Successful
4 October; 17:50	First active communications satellite.					
10 October; 14:27:49	(Soviet Union) Molniya (8K78)	L1-4M	(Soviet Union) Baikonur Site 1/5		(Soviet Union) RVSN	
10 October; 14:27:49	(Soviet Union) Mars 1M №1	RVSN	Intended: Heliocentric	Mars probe	10 October	Launch failure
10 October; 14:27:49	Maiden flight of Molniya, first launch of a spacecraft to fly past Mars. Loss of control 301 seconds after launch due to resonance problem.					
11 October; 20:33	(United States) Atlas LV-3A Agena-A		(United States) Point Arguello LC-1-1		(United States) US Air Force	
11 October; 20:33	(United States) Samos E-1 1 (Samos 1)	US Air Force	Intended: Sun-synchronous	Optical reconnaissance	11 October	Launch failure
11 October; 20:33	(United States) Samos F-1 1	US Air Force	Intended: Sun-synchronous	Optical reconnaissance	11 October	Launch failure
11 October; 20:33	Upper stage malfunction.					
14 October; 13:51:03	(Soviet Union) Molniya (8K78)	L1-5M	(Soviet Union) Baikonur Site 1/5		(Soviet Union) RVSN	
14 October; 13:51:03	(Soviet Union) Mars 1M №2	RVSN	Intended: Heliocentric	Mars probe	14 October	Launch failure
14 October; 13:51:03	Second stage failed to ignite.					
26 October; 20:26	(United States) Thor DM-21 Agena-B		(United States) Vandenberg LC-75-3-4		(United States) US Air Force	
26 October; 20:26	(United States) Discoverer 16 (KH-2 1/9011)	CIA DST	Low Earth (Polar)	Optical imaging	26 October	Launch failure
26 October; 20:26	(United States) SRV 506	CIA DST	Intended: Low Earth (Polar)	Film return	26 October	Launch failure
26 October; 20:26	Maiden flight of Thor-Agena B, second stage failed to separate.					
← Jan; Feb; Mar; Apr; May; Jun; Jul; Aug; Sep; Oct; Nov; Dec →; === November ===
3 November; 05:23:10	(United States) Juno II	AM-19D	(United States) Cape Canaveral LC-26B		(United States) ABMA	
3 November; 05:23:10	(United States) Explorer 8 (S-30)	NASA	Medium Earth	Ionospheric	28 March 2012	Successful
3 November; 05:23:10	Batteries expired on 27 December.					
12 November; 20:43	(United States) Thor DM-21 Agena-B		(United States) Vandenberg LC-75-3-5		(United States) US Air Force	
12 November; 20:43	(United States) Discoverer 17 (KH-2 2/9012)	CIA DST	Low Earth (Polar)	Optical imaging	29 December	Spacecraft failure
12 November; 20:43	(United States) SRV 507	CIA DST	Low Earth (Polar)	Film return	14 November	Successful
12 November; 20:43	Film jettisonned before camera started taking images.					
23 November; 11:13:03	(United States) Thor DM-19 Delta	D003	(United States) Cape Canaveral LC-17A		(United States) US Air Force	
23 November; 11:13:03	(United States) TIROS-2 (Tiros-B)	NASA/NOAA	Low Earth	Weather	18 May 2014	Successful
30 November; 19:50	(United States) Thor DM-21 Ablestar		(United States) Cape Canaveral LC-17B		(United States) US Air Force	
30 November; 19:50	(United States) Transit 3A	US Navy	Intended: Low Earth	Navigation; Technology	30 November	Launch failure
30 November; 19:50	(United States) SOLRAD 2 (GRAB-2)	US Navy/NRL	Intended: Low Earth	Radiation research ELINT	30 November	Launch failure
30 November; 19:50	Destroyed by range safety following premature cutoff of first stage.					
← Jan; Feb; Mar; Apr; May; Jun; Jul; Aug; Sep; Oct; Nov; Dec →; === December ===
1 December; 07:30:04	(Soviet Union) Vostok-L (8K72)	L1-13	(Soviet Union) Baikonur Site 1/5		(Soviet Union) RVSN	
1 December; 07:30:04	(Soviet Union) Korabl-Sputnik 3 (Sputnik 6/Vostok-1K №3)	RVSN	Low Earth	Test flight	2 December; 07:15	Partial spacecraft failure
1 December; 07:30:04	Engine failed to cut off after deorbit burn leading to steeper descent than planned, burned up in atmosphere during re-entry.					
4 December; 21:14	(United States) Scout X-1	ST-3	(United States) Wallops Island LA-3		(United States) NASA	
4 December; 21:14	(United States) S-56	US Air Force	Intended: Medium Earth	Aeronomy	4 December	Launch failure
4 December; 21:14	First orbital launch attempt to use a Scout rocket, second stage malfunctioned, failed to reach orbit.					
7 December; 20:20:58	(United States) Thor DM-21 Agena-B		(United States) Vandenberg LC-75-3-4		(United States) US Air Force	
7 December; 20:20:58	(United States) Discoverer 18 (KH-2 3/9013)	CIA DST	Low Earth (Polar)	Optical imaging	2 April 1961	Successful
7 December; 20:20:58	(United States) SRV 508	CIA DST	Low Earth (Polar)	Film return	10 December	Successful
15 December; 09:10	(United States) Atlas-D Able		(United States) Cape Canaveral LC-12		(United States) US Air Force	
15 December; 09:10	(United States) Pioneer P-31 (Able VB)	US Air Force	Intended: Selenocentric	Lunar probe	15 December	Launch failure
15 December; 09:10	Final flight of Atlas-Able, first stage exploded during ascent.					
20 December; 20:32	(United States) Thor DM-21 Agena-B		(United States) Vandenberg LC-75-3-5		(United States) US Air Force	
20 December; 20:32	(United States) Discoverer 19 (MIDAS RM-1 prototype)	ARPA	Low Earth (Polar)	Technology	23 January 1961	Successful
22 December; 07:45:19	(Soviet Union) Vostok-K (8K72K)		(Soviet Union) Baikonur Site 1/5		(Soviet Union) RVSN	
22 December; 07:45:19	(Soviet Union) Vostok-1K №4	RVSN	Low Earth	Test flight	22 December	Launch failure
22 December; 07:45:19	Maiden flight of Vostok-K, second stage engine failure, spacecraft separated and recovered. Two dogs aboard, both survived.					
← Jan; Feb; Mar; Apr; May; Jun; Jul; Aug; Sep; Oct; Nov; Dec →

== Suborbital flights ==
Date and time (UTC)	Rocket	Flight number	Launch site		LSP	
Date and time (UTC)	Payload (⚀ = CubeSat)	Operator	Orbit	Function	Decay (UTC)	Outcome
Date and time (UTC)	Remarks					
1 October	(Soviet Union) R-12 Dvina		(Soviet Union) Kapustin Yar		(Soviet Union) RVSN	
1 October		RVSN	Suborbital	Missile test	1 October	Launch failure
4 October; 15:23	(United States) Scout X-1		(United States) Wallops Island LA-3		(United States) NASA	
4 October; 15:23		US Air Force	Suborbital	Plasma research	4 October	Successful
4 October; 15:23	Apogee: 5,600 kilometres (3,500 mi)					
5 October; 19:52	(United States) Aerobee-150 (Hi)		(Canada) Fort Churchill		(United States) NASA	
5 October; 19:52		NASA	Suborbital	Remote sensing	5 October	Successful
5 October; 19:52	Apogee: 225 kilometres (140 mi)					
5 October; 16:04	(United States) UGM-27 Polaris A1		(United States) Cape Canaveral LC-25A		(United States) US Navy	
5 October; 16:04		US Navy	Suborbital	Missile test	5 October	Successful
5 October; 16:04	Apogee: 500 kilometres (310 mi)					
7 October; 15:50	(United States) HGM-25A Titan I		(United States) Cape Canaveral LC-20		(United States) US Air Force	
7 October; 15:50		US Air Force	Suborbital	RV test	7 October	Successful
7 October; 15:50	Apogee: 1,000 kilometres (620 mi)					
7 October	(Soviet Union) R-12 Dvina		(Soviet Union) Kapustin Yar		(Soviet Union) RVSN	
7 October		RVSN	Suborbital	Missile test	7 October	Successful
7 October	Apogee: 402 kilometres (250 mi)					
8 October; 14:45	(Canada) Black Brant I		(Canada) Fort Churchill		(Canada) CARDE	
8 October; 14:45		DRTE	Suborbital	Auroral	8 October	Successful
8 October; 14:45	Apogee: 116 kilometres (72 mi)					
10 October	(United States) UGM-27 Polaris A1		(United States) Cape Canaveral LC-25A		(United States) US Navy	
10 October		US Navy	Suborbital	Missile test	10 October	Successful
10 October	Apogee: 500 kilometres (310 mi)					
11 October; 19:15	(United States) SM-65E Atlas		(United States) Cape Canaveral LC-13		(United States) US Air Force	
11 October; 19:15		US Air Force	Suborbital	Missile test	11 October	Launch failure
11 October; 19:15	Maiden flight of Atlas E, apogee: 1,000 kilometres (620 mi)					
11 October; 21:53	(United States) PGM-17 Thor DM-18A		(United States) Vandenberg LC-75-2-8		(United Kingdom) Royal Air Force	
11 October; 21:53		Royal Air Force	Suborbital	Missile test	11 October	Successful
11 October; 21:53	Apogee: 520 kilometres (320 mi)					
12 October; 16:37	(Canada) Black Brant II		(Canada) Fort Churchill		(Canada) CARDE	
12 October; 16:37		CARDE	Suborbital	Test flight	12 October	Successful
12 October; 16:37	Apogee: 196 kilometres (122 mi)					
12 October; 21:27	(Canada) Black Brant II		(Canada) Fort Churchill		(Canada) CARDE	
12 October; 21:27		CARDE	Suborbital	Test flight	12 October	Successful
12 October; 21:27	Apogee: 216 kilometres (134 mi)					
12 October	(United States) Kiva-Hopi		(United States) Point Arguello LC-B		(United States) US Air Force	
12 October		US Air Force	Suborbital	Aeronomy	12 October	
12 October	Apogee: 300 kilometres (190 mi)					
13 October; 04:53:49	(United States) SM-65D Atlas		(United States) Vandenberg LC-576B-3		(United States) US Air Force	
13 October; 04:53:49		US Air Force	Suborbital	Missile test	13 October	Launch failure
13 October; 04:53:49	Apogee: 20 kilometres (12 mi)					
13 October; 09:34	(United States) SM-65D Atlas		(United States) Cape Canaveral LC-11		(United States) US Air Force	
13 October; 09:34		US Air Force	Suborbital	Missile test	13 October	Successful
13 October; 09:34	Apogee: 1,800 kilometres (1,100 mi), carried three black mice					
15 October	(United States) UGM-27 Polaris A1		(United States) USS Patrick Henry, ETR		(United States) US Navy	
15 October		US Navy	Suborbital	Missile test	15 October	Successful
15 October	Apogee: 500 kilometres (310 mi)					
15 October	(United States) UGM-27 Polaris A1		(United States) USS Patrick Henry, ETR		(United States) US Navy	
15 October		US Navy	Suborbital	Missile test	15 October	Successful
15 October	Apogee: 500 kilometres (310 mi)					
16 October	(United States) UGM-27 Polaris A1		(United States) USS Patrick Henry, ETR		(United States) US Navy	
16 October		US Navy	Suborbital	Missile test	16 October	Successful
16 October	Apogee: 500 kilometres (310 mi)					
17 October; 21:04	(United States) Nike-Cajun		(Canada) Fort Churchill		(United States) US Air Force	
17 October; 21:04		UMI	Suborbital	Aeronomy	17 October	Successful
17 October; 21:04	Apogee: 132 kilometres (82 mi)					
17 October	(Soviet Union) R-12 Dvina		(Soviet Union) Kapustin Yar		(Soviet Union) RVSN	
17 October		RVSN	Suborbital	Missile test	17 October	Successful
17 October	Apogee: 402 kilometres (250 mi)					
18 October; 14:17	(United States) Iris		(United States) Wallops Island LA-1		(United States) NASA	
18 October; 14:17		NASA	Suborbital	Aeronomy	18 October	Successful
18 October; 14:17	Apogee: 225 kilometres (140 mi)					
18 October	(United States) UGM-27 Polaris A1		(United States) USS Patrick Henry, ETR		(United States) US Navy	
18 October		US Navy	Suborbital	Missile test	18 October	Successful
18 October	Apogee: 500 kilometres (310 mi)					
18 October	(Soviet Union) R-12 Dvina		(Soviet Union) Kapustin Yar		(Soviet Union) RVSN	
18 October		RVSN	Suborbital	Missile test	18 October	Successful
18 October	Apogee: 402 kilometres (250 mi)					
18 October	(Soviet Union) R-12 Dvina		(Soviet Union) Kapustin Yar		(Soviet Union) RVSN	
18 October		RVSN	Suborbital	Missile test	18 October	Successful
18 October	Apogee: 402 kilometres (250 mi)					
19 October	(Soviet Union) R-12 Dvina		(Soviet Union) Kapustin Yar		(Soviet Union) RVSN	
19 October		RVSN	Suborbital	Missile test	19 October	Successful
19 October	Apogee: 402 kilometres (250 mi)					
20 October; 16:02	(United States) PGM-19 Jupiter		(United States) Cape Canaveral LC-26A		(United States) ABMA	
20 October; 16:02		US Air Force	Suborbital	Missile test	20 October	Successful
20 October; 16:02	Apogee: 500 kilometres (310 mi)					
20 October; 19:50	(Canada) Black Brant I		(Canada) Fort Churchill		(Canada) DRTE	
20 October; 19:50		DRTE	Suborbital	Ionospheric	20 October	Successful
20 October; 19:50	Apogee: 137 kilometres (85 mi)					
20 October	(Soviet Union) R-12 Dvina		(Soviet Union) Kapustin Yar		(Soviet Union) RVSN	
20 October		RVSN	Suborbital	Missile test	20 October	Successful
20 October	Apogee: 402 kilometres (250 mi)					
21 October	(Soviet Union) R-12 Dvina		(Soviet Union) Kapustin Yar		(Soviet Union) RVSN	
21 October		RVSN	Suborbital	Missile test	21 October	Successful
21 October	Apogee: 402 kilometres (250 mi)					
22 October; 03:09	(United States) Trailblazer 1		(United States) Wallops Island		(United States) NASA	
22 October; 03:09		NASA	Suborbital	RV test	22 October	Successful
22 October; 03:09	Apogee: 260 kilometres (160 mi)					
22 October; 05:13	(United States) SM-65D Atlas		(United States) Cape Canaveral LC-14		(United States) US Air Force	
22 October; 05:13		US Air Force	Suborbital	Missile test	22 October	Successful
22 October; 05:13	Apogee: 1,800 kilometres (1,100 mi)					
24 October; 23:16	(United States) HGM-25A Titan I		(United States) Cape Canaveral LC-19		(United States) US Air Force	
24 October; 23:16		US Air Force	Suborbital	RV test	24 October	Successful
24 October; 23:16	Apogee: 1,000 kilometres (620 mi)					
24 October	(United States) NOTS-EV-2 Caleb		(United States) F4D, Point Arguello		(United States) US Navy	
24 October		US Navy	Suborbital	Test flight	24 October	Launch failure
24 October	Apogee: 20 kilometres (12 mi), second stage failed to ignite					
27 October	(Soviet Union) R-12 Dvina		(Soviet Union) Kapustin Yar		(Soviet Union) RVSN	
27 October		RVSN	Suborbital	Missile test	27 October	Successful
27 October	Apogee: 402 kilometres (250 mi)					
27 October	(United States) Kiva-Hopi		(United States) Point Arguello LC-B		(United States) US Air Force	
27 October		US Air Force	Suborbital	Aeronomy	27 October	
27 October	Apogee: 300 kilometres (190 mi)					
28 October; 12:21	(Canada) Black Brant I		(Canada) Fort Churchill		(Canada) DRTE	
28 October; 12:21		DRTE	Suborbital	Ionospheric	28 October	Successful
28 October; 12:21	Apogee: 150 kilometres (93 mi)					
October	(United States) Nike-Zeus		(United States) White Sands LC-38		(United States) US Army	
October		US Army	Suborbital	Test flight	October	Successful
October	Apogee: 150 kilometres (93 mi)					
October	(Soviet Union) R-12 Dvina		(Soviet Union) Kapustin Yar		(Soviet Union) RVSN	
October		RVSN	Suborbital	Missile test	October	Successful
October	Apogee: 402 kilometres (250 mi)					
October	(Soviet Union) R-12 Dvina		(Soviet Union) Kapustin Yar		(Soviet Union) RVSN	
October		RVSN	Suborbital	Missile test	October	Successful
October	Apogee: 402 kilometres (250 mi)					
October	(Soviet Union) R-14 Chusovaya		(Soviet Union) Kapustin Yar		(Soviet Union) RVSN	
October		RVSN	Suborbital	Missile test	October	Successful
October	Apogee: 675 kilometres (419 mi)					
October	(Soviet Union) R-14 Chusovaya		(Soviet Union) Kapustin Yar		(Soviet Union) RVSN	
October		RVSN	Suborbital	Missile test	October	Successful
October	Apogee: 675 kilometres (419 mi)					
1 November	(Soviet Union) R-12 Dvina		(Soviet Union) Kapustin Yar		(Soviet Union) RVSN	
1 November		RVSN	Suborbital	Missile test	1 November	Successful
1 November	Apogee: 402 kilometres (250 mi)					
2 November; 22:25	(United States) Nike-Cajun		(United States) Wallops Island		(United States) NASA	
2 November; 22:25		UMI	Suborbital	Aeronomy	2 November	Successful
2 November; 22:25	Apogee: 109 kilometres (68 mi)					
3 November; 21:19	(United States) Nike-Asp		(United States) Wallops Island		(United States) NASA	
3 November; 21:19		NASA	Suborbital	Test flight	3 November	Successful
3 November; 21:19	Apogee: 193 kilometres (120 mi)					
4 November; 20:52	(United States) Nike-Cajun		(United States) Eglin		(United States) US Air Force	
4 November; 20:52		US Air Force	Suborbital	Test flight	4 November	Successful
4 November; 20:52	Apogee: 100 kilometres (62 mi)					
4 November	(Soviet Union) R-12 Dvina		(Soviet Union) Kapustin Yar		(Soviet Union) RVSN	
4 November		RVSN	Suborbital	Missile test	4 November	Successful
4 November	Apogee: 402 kilometres (250 mi)					
4 November	(Soviet Union) R-12 Dvina		(Soviet Union) Kapustin Yar		(Soviet Union) RVSN	
4 November		RVSN	Suborbital	Missile test	4 November	Successful
4 November	Apogee: 402 kilometres (250 mi)					
4 November	(Soviet Union) R-12 Dvina		(Soviet Union) Kapustin Yar		(Soviet Union) RVSN	
4 November		RVSN	Suborbital	Missile test	4 November	Successful
4 November	Apogee: 402 kilometres (250 mi)					
5 November; 01:00	(China) (Soviet Union) (East Germany) Dong Feng 1		(China) Jiuquan LA-3		(China) PLA	
5 November; 01:00		PLA	Suborbital	Missile test	5 November	Successful
5 November; 01:00	Apogee: 100 kilometres (62 mi)					
5 November	(Soviet Union) R-5 Pobeda		(Soviet Union) Chelkar		(Soviet Union) OKB-30	
5 November		OKB-30	Suborbital	Target	5 November	Launch failure
5 November	Apogee: 300 kilometres (190 mi)					
7 November; 19:00	(United States) UGM-27 Polaris A1		(United States) Cape Canaveral LC-25A		(United States) US Navy	
7 November; 19:00		US Navy	Suborbital	Missile test	7 November	Successful
7 November; 19:00	Apogee: 500 kilometres (310 mi)					
8 November; 13:18	(United States) XRM-91 Blue Scout Junior		(United States) Cape Canaveral LC-18A		(United States) US Air Force	
8 November; 13:18	(United States) HETS	US Air Force	Suborbital	Magnetospheric	8 November	Launch failure
8 November; 13:18	Apogee: 200 kilometres (120 mi)					
10 November; 01:44	(United States) Javelin		(United States) Wallops Island		(United States) NASA	
10 November; 01:44		NASA	Suborbital	Aeronomy	10 November	Successful
10 November; 01:44	Apogee: 975 kilometres (606 mi)					
10 November; 02:35	(United States) Aerobee-150 (Hi)		(United States) White Sands LC-35		(United States) NRL	
10 November; 02:35			Suborbital	Aeronomy	10 November	Successful
10 November; 02:35	Apogee: 211 kilometres (131 mi)					
10 November; 16:22	(United States) UGM-27 Polaris A2		(United States) Cape Canaveral LC-25A		(United States) US Navy	
10 November; 16:22		US Navy	Suborbital	Missile test	10 November	Successful
10 November; 16:22	Maiden flight of Polaris A2, apogee: 1,000 kilometres (620 mi)					
11 November; 11:22	(United States) Nike-Cajun		(Canada) Fort Churchill		(United States) NASA	
11 November; 11:22		NASA	Suborbital	Magnetospheric	11 November	Successful
11 November; 11:22	Apogee: 129 kilometres (80 mi)					
11 November; 12:11	(United States) Nike-Cajun		(Canada) Fort Churchill		(United States) NASA	
11 November; 12:11		NASA	Suborbital	Magnetospheric	11 November	Successful
11 November; 12:11	Apogee: 129 kilometres (80 mi)					
12 November; 18:40	(United States) Nike-Cajun		(Canada) Fort Churchill		(United States) NASA	
12 November; 18:40		NASA	Suborbital	Magnetospheric	12 November	Successful
12 November; 18:40	Apogee: 129 kilometres (80 mi)					
12 November; 23:32	(United States) Nike-Cajun		(Canada) Fort Churchill		(United States) NASA	
12 November; 23:32		NASA	Suborbital	Magnetospheric	12 November	Successful
12 November; 23:32	Apogee: 129 kilometres (80 mi)					
12 November	(Soviet Union) R-12 Dvina		(Soviet Union) Kapustin Yar		(Soviet Union) RVSN	
12 November		RVSN	Suborbital	Missile test	12 November	Successful
12 November	Apogee: 402 kilometres (250 mi)					
13 November; 16:03	(United States) Nike-Cajun		(Canada) Fort Churchill		(United States) NASA	
13 November; 16:03		NASA	Suborbital	Magnetospheric	13 November	Successful
13 November; 16:03	Apogee: 129 kilometres (80 mi)					
15 November; 05:54	(United States) SM-65D Atlas		(United States) Cape Canaveral LC-12		(United States) US Air Force	
15 November; 05:54		US Air Force	Suborbital	Missile test	15 November	Successful
15 November; 05:54	Apogee: 1,800 kilometres (1,100 mi)					
15 November; 16:41	(United States) Aerobee-150A		(United States) Wallops Island		(United States) NASA	
15 November; 16:41		NASA	Suborbital	Aeronomy	15 November	Successful
15 November; 16:41	Apogee: 227 kilometres (141 mi)					
16 November; 11:02	(United Kingdom) Skylark-2		(Australia) Woomera LA-2		(United Kingdom) RAE	
16 November; 11:02		WRE/RAE	Suborbital	Test flight	16 November	Successful
16 November; 11:02	Apogee: 105 kilometres (65 mi)					
16 November; 17:37	(United States) Nike-Cajun		(United States) Wallops Island		(United States) NASA	
16 November; 17:37		UMI	Suborbital	Aeronomy	16 November	Successful
16 November; 17:37	Apogee: 152 kilometres (94 mi)					
16 November; 18:25	(United States) MGM-31 Pershing I		(United States) Cape Canaveral LC-30A		(United States) US Army	
16 November; 18:25		US Army	Suborbital	Missile test	16 November	Successful
16 November; 18:25	Apogee: 250 kilometres (160 mi)					
16 November; 19:51	(United States) Nike-Cajun		(Canada) Fort Churchill		(United States) NASA	
16 November; 19:51		NASA	Suborbital	Magnetospheric	16 November	Successful
16 November; 19:51	Apogee: 129 kilometres (80 mi)					
17 November; 06:00	(United States) Nike-Cajun		(Canada) Fort Churchill		(United States) NASA	
17 November; 06:00		NASA	Suborbital	Magnetospheric	17 November	Successful
17 November; 06:00	Apogee: 129 kilometres (80 mi)					
17 November; 10:06	(United States) Nike-Cajun		(United States) White Sands		(United States)	
17 November; 10:06			Suborbital	Aeronomy	17 November	Successful
17 November; 10:06	Apogee: 152 kilometres (94 mi)					
17 November; 10:40	(United Kingdom) Skylark-2C		(Australia) Woomera LA-2		(United Kingdom) RAE	
17 November; 10:40		UCL/QUB	Suborbital	Aeronomy	17 November	Successful
17 November; 10:40	Apogee: 247 kilometres (153 mi)					
17 November; 13:40	(United States) Aerobee-150 (Hi)		(United States) White Sands LC-35		(United States) US Air Force	
17 November; 13:40		US Air Force	Suborbital	Aeronomy	17 November	Successful
17 November; 13:40	Apogee: 217 kilometres (135 mi)					
17 November; 19:00	(United States) UGM-27 Polaris A1		(United States) Cape Canaveral LC-25A		(United States) US Navy	
17 November; 19:00		US Navy	Suborbital	Missile test	17 November	Launch failure
17 November; 19:00	Apogee: 10 kilometres (6.2 mi)					
17 November	(Soviet Union) R-5A Pobeda		(Soviet Union) Chelkar		(Soviet Union) RVSN	
17 November		RVSN	Suborbital	Target	17 November	Successful
17 November	Apogee: 500 kilometres (310 mi)					
18 November; 03:39	(United States) Nike-Cajun		(Canada) Fort Churchill		(United States) NASA	
18 November; 03:39		NASA	Suborbital	Magnetospheric	18 November	Successful
18 November; 03:39	Apogee: 128 kilometres (80 mi)					
18 November; 23:39	(United States) Nike-Cajun		(Canada) Fort Churchill		(United States) NASA	
18 November; 23:39		NASA	Suborbital	Magnetospheric	18 November	Successful
18 November; 23:39	Apogee: 129 kilometres (80 mi)					
21 November; 14:00	(United States) Redstone MRLV		(United States) Cape Canaveral LC-5		(United States) US Air Force	
21 November; 14:00	(United States) Mercury-Redstone 1	NASA	Intended: Suborbital	Test flight	+2 seconds	Launch failure
21 November; 14:00	Engine failure one second after launch, rocket settled back onto launch pad without exploding, spacecraft later reflown as Mercury-Redstone 1A using different rocket. Apogee: 10 centimetres (3.9 in)					
21 November	(United States) Nike-Cajun		(United States) Point Arguello LC-B		(United States) AEC	
21 November		AEC	Suborbital	Aeronomy	21 November	
21 November	Apogee: 100 kilometres (62 mi)					
22 November; 08:42	(United States) Aerobee-150A		(United States) Wallops Island		(United States) NASA	
22 November; 08:42		NASA	Suborbital	UV Astronomy	22 November	Successful
22 November; 08:42	Apogee: 183 kilometres (114 mi)					
22 November	(United States) Nike-Cajun		(United States) Point Arguello LC-B		(United States) AEC	
22 November		AEC	Suborbital	Aeronomy	22 November	
22 November	Apogee: 100 kilometres (62 mi)					
23 November; 23:55	(United Kingdom) Skylark-2		(Australia) Woomera LA-2		(United Kingdom) RAE	
23 November; 23:55		RAE	Suborbital	Ionospheric	23 November	Successful
23 November; 23:55	Apogee: 160 kilometres (99 mi)					
24 November	(Soviet Union) R-5A Pobeda		(Soviet Union) Chelkar		(Soviet Union) RVSN	
24 November		RVSN	Suborbital	Target	24 November	Launch failure
25 November	(France) Antares (OPd-56-39-22D)		(France) CERES		(France) ONERA	
25 November		ONERA	Suborbital	RV test	25 November	Successful
25 November	Apogee: 150 kilometres (93 mi)					
29 November; 11:16	(United States) Aerobee-150 (Hi)		(United States) White Sands LC-35		(United States) NRL	
29 November; 11:16			Suborbital	UV Astronomy	29 November	Successful
29 November; 11:16	Apogee: 197 kilometres (122 mi)					
30 November; 01:12	(United States) SM-65E Atlas		(United States) Cape Canaveral LC-13		(United States) US Air Force	
30 November; 01:12		US Air Force	Suborbital	Missile test	30 November	Launch failure
30 November; 01:12	Apogee: 1,000 kilometres (620 mi)					
30 November; 05:01	(United States) Aerobee-150 (Hi)		(Canada) Fort Churchill		(United States) US Air Force	
30 November; 05:01		US Air Force	Suborbital	Ionospheric	30 November	Successful
30 November; 05:01	Apogee: 241 kilometres (150 mi)					
30 November	(Soviet Union) R-12 Dvina		(Soviet Union) Kapustin Yar		(Soviet Union) RVSN	
30 November		RVSN	Suborbital	Missile test	30 November	Successful
30 November	Apogee: 402 kilometres (250 mi)					
30 November	(France) Antares (OPd-56-39-22D)		(France) CERES		(France) ONERA	
30 November		ONERA	Suborbital	RV test	30 November	Successful
30 November	Apogee: 150 kilometres (93 mi)					
1 December	(United States) Nike-Zeus		(United States) White Sands LC-38		(United States) US Army	
1 December		US Army	Suborbital	Test flight	1 December	Successful
1 December	Apogee: 150 kilometres (93 mi)					
5 December	(United States) UGM-27 Polaris A2		(United States) Cape Canaveral LC-25A		(United States) US Navy	
5 December		US Navy	Suborbital	Missile test	5 December	Successful
5 December	Apogee: 1,000 kilometres (620 mi)					
6 December; 18:44	(United States) Kiva-Hopi		(United States) Point Arguello LC-B		(United States) US Air Force	
6 December; 18:44	(United States) Phoenix	US Air Force	Suborbital	Ionospheric	6 December	Successful
6 December; 18:44	Apogee: 367 kilometres (228 mi)					
7 December; 00:20	(United Kingdom) Skylark-2		(Australia) Woomera LA-2		(United Kingdom) RAE	
7 December; 00:20		RAE	Suborbital	Ionospheric	7 December	Launch failure
7 December; 00:20	Apogee: 35 kilometres (22 mi)					
8 December; 16:52:09	(United States) Nike-Cajun		(United States) Wallops Island		(United States) NASA	
8 December; 16:52:09		GCA	Suborbital	Ionospheric	8 December	Successful
8 December; 16:52:09	Apogee: 152 kilometres (94 mi)					
8 December	(Soviet Union) R-5 Pobeda		(Soviet Union) Chelkar		(Soviet Union) OKB-30	
8 December		OKB-30	Suborbital	Target	8 December	Launch failure
8 December	Apogee: 300 kilometres (190 mi)					
9 December; 11:20	(United States) Nike-Cajun		(United States) Wallops Island		(United States) NASA	
9 December; 11:20		GCA	Suborbital	Aeronomy	9 December	Successful
9 December; 11:20	Apogee: 146 kilometres (91 mi)					
9 December; 22:15	(United States) Nike-Cajun		(United States) Wallops Island		(United States) NASA	
9 December; 22:15		GCA	Suborbital	Aeronomy	9 December	Launch failure
9 December; 22:15	Apogee: 24 kilometres (15 mi)					
10 December; 22:30	(United States) Javelin		(United States) Wallops Island		(United States) NASA	
10 December; 22:30		GCA	Suborbital	Aeronomy	10 December	Successful
10 December; 22:30	Apogee: 716 kilometres (445 mi)					
10 December	(Soviet Union) R-5 Pobeda		(Soviet Union) Chelkar		(Soviet Union) OKB-30	
10 December		OKB-30	Suborbital	Target	10 December	Successful
10 December	Apogee: 300 kilometres (190 mi)					
11 December	(Soviet Union) R-12 Dvina		(Soviet Union) Kapustin Yar		(Soviet Union) RVSN	
11 December		RVSN	Suborbital	Missile test	11 December	Successful
11 December	Apogee: 402 kilometres (250 mi)					
12 December; 18:42	(United States) MGM-31 Pershing I		(United States) Cape Canaveral LC-30A		(United States) US Army	
12 December; 18:42		US Army	Suborbital	Missile test	12 December	Successful
12 December; 18:42	Apogee: 250 kilometres (160 mi)					
12 December; 22:36	(United States) Javelin		(United States) Wallops Island		(United States) NASA	
12 December; 22:36		NASA	Suborbital	Magnetospheric	12 December	Successful
12 December; 22:36	Apogee: 1,140 kilometres (710 mi)					
12 December	(Soviet Union) R-12 Dvina		(Soviet Union) Kapustin Yar		(Soviet Union) RVSN	
12 December		RVSN	Suborbital	Missile test	12 December	Successful
12 December	Apogee: 402 kilometres (250 mi)					
13 December; 20:08	(United States) PGM-17 Thor DM-18A		(United States) Vandenberg LC-75-2-8		(United Kingdom) Royal Air Force	
13 December; 20:08		Royal Air Force	Suborbital	Missile test	13 December	Successful
13 December; 20:08	Apogee: 520 kilometres (320 mi)					
14 December; 16:52	(United States) Nike-Cajun		(United States) Wallops Island		(United States) NASA	
14 December; 16:52		NASA	Suborbital	Aeronomy	14 December	Successful
14 December; 16:52	Apogee: 110 kilometres (68 mi)					
14 December	(United States) Kiva-Hopi		(United States) Point Arguello LC-B		(United States) US Air Force	
14 December		US Air Force	Suborbital	Aeronomy	14 December	
14 December	Apogee: 300 kilometres (190 mi)					
14 December	(United States) Kiva-Hopi		(United States) Point Arguello LC-B		(United States) US Air Force	
14 December		US Air Force	Suborbital	Aeronomy	14 December	
14 December	Apogee: 300 kilometres (190 mi)					
15 December	(Soviet Union) R-12 Dvina		(Soviet Union) Kapustin Yar		(Soviet Union) RVSN	
15 December		RVSN	Suborbital	Missile test	15 December	Successful
15 December	Apogee: 402 kilometres (250 mi)					
15 December	(Soviet Union) R-12 Dvina		(Soviet Union) Kapustin Yar		(Soviet Union) RVSN	
15 December		RVSN	Suborbital	Missile test	15 December	Successful
15 December	Apogee: 402 kilometres (250 mi)					
16 December; 20:35:33	(United States) SM-65D Atlas		(United States) Vandenberg LC-576B-3		(United States) US Air Force	
16 December; 20:35:33		US Air Force	Suborbital	Missile test	16 December	Successful
16 December; 20:35:33	Apogee: 1,800 kilometres (1,100 mi)					
16 December	(United States) Kiva-Hopi		(United States) Point Arguello LC-B		(United States) US Air Force	
16 December		US Air Force	Suborbital	Aeronomy	16 December	
16 December	Apogee: 300 kilometres (190 mi)					
16 December	(United States) Kiva-Hopi		(United States) Point Arguello LC-B		(United States) US Air Force	
16 December		US Air Force	Suborbital	Aeronomy	16 December	
16 December	Apogee: 300 kilometres (190 mi)					
17 December	(Soviet Union) R-5 Pobeda		(Soviet Union) Chelkar		(Soviet Union) OKB-30	
17 December		OKB-30	Suborbital	Target	17 December	Successful
17 December	Apogee: 300 kilometres (190 mi)					
19 December; 16:15	(United States) Redstone MRLV		(United States) Cape Canaveral LC-5		(United States) US Air Force	
19 December; 16:15	(United States) Mercury-Redstone 1A	NASA	Suborbital	Test flight	17:00	Successful
19 December; 16:15	Reflight of Mercury-Redstone 1, apogee: 210 kilometres (130 mi)					
20 December	(Soviet Union) R-12 Dvina		(Soviet Union) Kapustin Yar		(Soviet Union) RVSN	
20 December		RVSN	Suborbital	Missile test	20 December	Successful
20 December	Apogee: 402 kilometres (250 mi)					
20 December	(United States) HGM-25A Titan I		(United States) Cape Canaveral LC-20		(United States) US Air Force	
20 December		US Air Force	Suborbital	RV test	20 December	Launch failure
22 December; 18:34	(United States) UGM-27 Polaris A1		(United States) USS Robert E. Lee, ETR		(United States) US Navy	
22 December; 18:34		US Navy	Suborbital	Missile test	22 December	Successful
22 December; 18:34	Apogee: 500 kilometres (310 mi)					
22 December	(Soviet Union) R-5 Pobeda		(Soviet Union) Chelkar		(Soviet Union) OKB-30	
22 December		OKB-30	Suborbital	Target	22 December	Successful
22 December	Apogee: 300 kilometres (190 mi)					
22 December	(Soviet Union) R-12 Dvina		(Soviet Union) Kapustin Yar		(Soviet Union) RVSN	
22 December		RVSN	Suborbital	Missile test	22 December	Successful
22 December	Apogee: 402 kilometres (250 mi)					
22 December	(Soviet Union) R-12 Dvina		(Soviet Union) Kapustin Yar		(Soviet Union) RVSN	
22 December		RVSN	Suborbital	Missile test	22 December	Successful
22 December	Apogee: 402 kilometres (250 mi)					
23 December	(Soviet Union) R-5 Pobeda		(Soviet Union) Chelkar		(Soviet Union) OKB-30	
23 December		OKB-30	Suborbital	Target	23 December	Successful
23 December	Apogee: 300 kilometres (190 mi)					
23 December	(Soviet Union) R-12 Dvina		(Soviet Union) Kapustin Yar		(Soviet Union) RVSN	
23 December		RVSN	Suborbital	Missile test	23 December	Successful
23 December	Apogee: 402 kilometres (250 mi)					
24 December	(Soviet Union) R-5 Pobeda		(Soviet Union) Chelkar		(Soviet Union) OKB-30	
24 December		OKB-30	Suborbital	Target	24 December	Successful
24 December	Apogee: 300 kilometres (190 mi)					
24 December	(Soviet Union) R-12 Dvina		(Soviet Union) Kapustin Yar		(Soviet Union) RVSN	
24 December		RVSN	Suborbital	Missile test	24 December	Successful
24 December	Apogee: 402 kilometres (250 mi)					
24 December	(Soviet Union) R-14 Chusovaya		(Soviet Union) Kapustin Yar		(Soviet Union) RVSN	
24 December		RVSN	Suborbital	Missile test	24 December	Successful
24 December	Apogee: 675 kilometres (419 mi)					
26 December	(Soviet Union) R-12 Dvina		(Soviet Union) Kapustin Yar		(Soviet Union) RVSN	
26 December		RVSN	Suborbital	Missile test	26 December	Successful
26 December	Apogee: 402 kilometres (250 mi)					
29 December	(Soviet Union) R-12 Dvina		(Soviet Union) Kapustin Yar		(Soviet Union) RVSN	
29 December		RVSN	Suborbital	Missile test	29 December	Successful
29 December	Apogee: 402 kilometres (250 mi)					
31 December	(Soviet Union) R-14 Chusovaya		(Soviet Union) Kapustin Yar		(Soviet Union) RVSN	
31 December		RVSN	Suborbital	Missile test	31 December	Successful
31 December	Apogee: 675 kilometres (419 mi)					
31 December	(Soviet Union) R-5 Pobeda		(Soviet Union) Chelkar		(Soviet Union) OKB-30	
31 December		OKB-30	Suborbital	Target	31 December	Successful
31 December	Apogee: 300 kilometres (190 mi)					
December	(China) (Soviet Union) (East Germany) Dong Feng 1		(China) Jiuquan LA-3		(China) PLA	
December		PLA	Suborbital	Missile test	December	Successful
December	Apogee: 100 kilometres (62 mi)					
December	(China) (Soviet Union) (East Germany) Dong Feng 1		(China) Jiuquan LA-3		(China) PLA	
December		PLA	Suborbital	Missile test	December	Successful
December	Apogee: 100 kilometres (62 mi)					
December	(United States) Nike-Zeus		(United States) White Sands LC-38		(United States) US Army	
December		US Army	Suborbital	Test flight	December	Successful
December	Apogee: 150 kilometres (93 mi)					
December	(United States) Nike-Nike-Recruit		(United States) Wallops Island		(United States) NASA	
December		NASA	Suborbital	RV test	December	Successful
December	Apogee: 120 kilometres (75 mi)					
Unknown	(United States) Nike-Nike-Recruit		(United States) Wallops Island		(United States) NASA	
Unknown		NASA	Suborbital	RV test	Unknown	Successful
Unknown	Apogee: 120 kilometres (75 mi)					
Unknown	(United States) Jaguar		(United States) B-57, White Sands		(United States) US Air Force	
Unknown		US Air Force	Suborbital	Aeronomy	Unknown	Successful
Unknown	Apogee: 800 kilometres (500 mi)					
Unknown	(United States) Sparoair I		(United States) F3H-2, Point Mugu		(United States) US Navy	
Unknown		US Navy	Suborbital	Test flight	Unknown	Successful
Unknown	Apogee: 100 kilometres (62 mi)					
