= 1960 in spaceflight (May–August) =

This is a list of spaceflights launched between May and August 1960. For launches between January and April, see 1960 in spaceflight (January–April). For launches between September and December see 1960 in spaceflight (September-December). For an overview of the whole year, see 1960 in spaceflight.

== Orbital launches ==
- ← Jan
- Feb
- Mar
- Apr
- May
- Jun
- Jul
- Aug
- Sep
- Oct
- Nov
- Dec →

Date and time (UTC)	Rocket	Flight number	Launch site		LSP	
Date and time (UTC)	Payload (⚀ = CubeSat)	Operator	Orbit	Function	Decay (UTC)	Outcome
Date and time (UTC)	Remarks					
=== May ===
13 May; 09:16:05	(United States) Thor DM-19 Delta	D-1	(United States) Cape Canaveral LC-17A		(United States) US Air Force	
13 May; 09:16:05	(United States) Echo 1	NASA	Intended: Medium Earth	Communication; Technology	13 May	Launch failure
13 May; 09:16:05	Maiden flight of Thor-Delta, upper stage attitude control system malfunctioned, failed to reach orbit.					
15 May; 00:00:05	(Soviet Union) Vostok-L (8K72)	L1-11	(Soviet Union) Baikonur Site 1/5		(Soviet Union) RVSN	
15 May; 00:00:05	(Soviet Union) Korabl-Sputnik 1 (Sputnik 4/Vostok-1KP №1)	RVSN	Low Earth	Test flight	15 October 1965	Partial spacecraft failure
15 May; 00:00:05	Deorbit burn boosted spacecraft into higher orbit due to incorrect orientation.					
24 May; 17:36:46	(United States) Atlas LV-3A Agena-A		(United States) Cape Canaveral LC-14		(United States) US Air Force	
24 May; 17:36:46	(United States) MIDAS-2	US Air Force	Low Earth	Missile defence	7 February 1974	Successful
← Jan; Feb; Mar; Apr; May; Jun; Jul; Aug; Sep; Oct; Nov; Dec →; === June ===
22 June; 05:54	(United States) Thor DM-21 Ablestar		(United States) Cape Canaveral LC-17B		(United States) US Air Force	
22 June; 05:54	(United States) Transit 2A	US Navy	Low Earth	Navigation; Technology	In orbit	Successful
22 June; 05:54	(United States) SOLRAD 1 (GRAB-1)	US Navy/NRL	Low Earth	Radiation research ELINT	In orbit	Successful
29 June; 22:00:44	(United States) Thor DM-18 Agena-A		(United States) Vandenberg LC-75-3-4		(United States) US Air Force	
29 June; 22:00:44	(United States) Discoverer 12 (KH-1 prototype)	CIA DST	Intended: Low Earth (Polar)	Technology	29 June	Launch failure
29 June; 22:00:44	(United States) SRV (GRD)	CIA DST	Intended: Low Earth (Polar)	Technology	29 June	Launch failure
29 June; 22:00:44	Failed to reach orbit.					
← Jan; Feb; Mar; Apr; May; Jun; Jul; Aug; Sep; Oct; Nov; Dec →; === July ===
28 July; 09:31	(Soviet Union) Vostok-L (8K72)	L1-10	(Soviet Union) Baikonur Site 1/5		(Soviet Union) RVSN	
28 July; 09:31	(Soviet Union) Vostok-1K №1	RVSN	Low Earth	Test flight	+28.5 seconds	Launch failure
28 July; 09:31	Booster engine burned through leading to premature separation 17 seconds after launch, rocket exploded shortly afterwards. Two dogs aboard spacecraft, killed in explosion.					
← Jan; Feb; Mar; Apr; May; Jun; Jul; Aug; Sep; Oct; Nov; Dec →; === August ===
10 August; 20:37:54	(United States) Thor DM-18 Agena-A		(United States) Vandenberg LC-75-3-5		(United States) US Air Force	
10 August; 20:37:54	(United States) Discoverer 13 (KH-1 prototype)	CIA DST	Low Earth (Polar)	Technology	14 November	Successful
10 August; 20:37:54	(United States) SRV (GRD)	CIA DST	Low Earth (Polar)	Technology	11 August	Successful
10 August; 20:37:54	SRV recovered at sea, first successful recovery of a spacecraft from orbit.					
12 August; 09:39:43	(United States) Thor DM-19 Delta	D002	(United States) Cape Canaveral LC-17A		(United States) US Air Force	
12 August; 09:39:43	(United States) Echo 1A	NASA	Medium Earth	Communication; Technology	24 May 1968	Successful
18 August; 19:57:08	(United States) Thor DM-18 Agena-A		(United States) Vandenberg LC-75-3-4		(United States) US Air Force	
18 August; 19:57:08	(United States) Discoverer 14 (KH-1 9/9009)	CIA DST	Low Earth (Polar)	Optical imaging	16 September	Successful
18 August; 19:57:08	(United States) SRV 101	CIA DST	Low Earth (Polar)	Film return	20 August	Successful
18 August; 19:57:08	SRV recovered in mid-air by a C-119 Flying Boxcar, first mid-air retrieval of a spacecraft.					
18 August; 19:58	(United States) Thor DM-21 Ablestar		(United States) Cape Canaveral LC-17B		(United States) US Air Force	
18 August; 19:58	(United States) Courier 1A	US Army	Intended: Low Earth	Communication	+150 seconds	Launch failure
18 August; 19:58	Rocket exploded during ascent Shortest interval between orbital launch attempts (less than a minute).					
19 August; 08:44:06	(Soviet Union) Vostok-L (8K72)	L1-12	(Soviet Union) Baikonur Site 1/5		(Soviet Union) RVSN	
19 August; 08:44:06	(Soviet Union) Korabl-Sputnik 2 (Sputnik 5/Vostok-1K №2)	RVSN	Low Earth	Test flight	20 August	Successful
19 August; 08:44:06	First animals recovered from orbit.					
← Jan; Feb; Mar; Apr; May; Jun; Jul; Aug; Sep; Oct; Nov; Dec →
For flights after 31 August, see 1960 in spaceflight (September–December)

== Suborbital flights ==
Date and time (UTC)	Rocket	Flight number	Launch site		LSP	
Date and time (UTC)	Payload (⚀ = CubeSat)	Operator	Orbit	Function	Decay (UTC)	Outcome
Date and time (UTC)	Remarks					
1 July; 14:35	(United States) Aerobee-150 (Hi)		(United States) White Sands LC-35		(United States) US Air Force	
1 July; 14:35		US Air Force	Suborbital	Meteoroid research	1 July	Successful
1 July; 14:35	Apogee: 162 kilometres (101 mi)					
1 July; 17:29	(United States) HGM-25A Titan I		(United States) Cape Canaveral LC-20		(United States) US Air Force	
1 July; 17:29		US Air Force	Suborbital	RV test	1 July	Launch failure
1 July; 17:29	Apogee: 1 kilometre (0.62 mi), exploded above pad					
2 July; 00:04	(United States) Scout X-1		(United States) Wallops Island LA-3		(United States) NASA	
2 July; 00:04		NASA	Suborbital	Test flight	2 July	Launch failure
2 July; 00:04	Maiden flight of Scout X-1, apogee: 1,380 kilometres (860 mi)					
2 July; 06:58	(United States) SM-65D Atlas		(United States) Cape Canaveral LC-11		(United States) US Air Force	
2 July; 06:58		US Air Force	Suborbital	Missile test	2 July	Successful
2 July; 06:58	Apogee: 1,800 kilometres (1,100 mi)					
4 July	(Soviet Union) (East Germany) R-2A		(Soviet Union) Kapustin Yar SP-2		(Soviet Union) NII-88	
4 July		NII-88	Suborbital	Target	4 July	Successful
4 July	Apogee: 100 kilometres (62 mi)					
5 July; 15:56	(Soviet Union) R-7A Semyorka		(Soviet Union) Baikonur Site 1/5		(Soviet Union) RVSN	
5 July; 15:56		RVSN	Suborbital	Missile test	5 July	Successful
5 July; 15:56	Apogee: 1,350 kilometres (840 mi)					
6 July; 15:55	(United States) UGM-27 Polaris A1		(United States) Cape Canaveral LC-25A		(United States) US Navy	
6 July; 15:55		US Navy	Suborbital	Missile test	6 July	Launch failure
6 July; 15:55	Apogee: 10 kilometres (6.2 mi)					
7 July; 15:27	(Soviet Union) R-7A Semyorka		(Soviet Union) Baikonur Site 1/5		(Soviet Union) RVSN	
7 July; 15:27		RVSN	Suborbital	Missile test	7 July	Successful
7 July; 15:27	Apogee: 1,350 kilometres (840 mi)					
7 July	(United States) UGM-27 Polaris A1		(United States) USNS Observation Island, ETR		(United States) US Navy	
7 July		US Navy	Suborbital	Missile test	7 July	Launch failure
7 July	(Soviet Union) (East Germany) R-2A		(Soviet Union) Kapustin Yar SP-2		(Soviet Union) NII-88	
7 July		NII-88	Suborbital	Target	7 July	Successful
7 July	Apogee: 100 kilometres (62 mi)					
9 July; 04:00	(United States) Nike-Cajun		(United States) Wallops Island		(United States) NASA	
9 July; 04:00		NASA	Suborbital	Aeronomy	9 July	Successful
9 July; 04:00	Apogee: 105 kilometres (65 mi)					
11 July; 04:24	(Japan) Kappa-8		(Japan) Akita		(Japan) ISAS	
11 July; 04:24		ISAS	Suborbital	Test flight	11 July	Successful
11 July; 04:24	First Japanese spaceflight, apogee: 150 kilometres (93 mi)					
12 July	(Soviet Union) R-12 Dvina		(Soviet Union) Kapustin Yar		(Soviet Union) RVSN	
12 July		RVSN	Suborbital	Missile test	12 July	Successful
12 July	Apogee: 402 kilometres (250 mi)					
13 July; 00:23	(United States) Nike-Cajun		(United States) Eglin		(United States) US Air Force	
13 July; 00:23		US Air Force	Suborbital	Aeronomy	13 July	Successful
13 July; 00:23	Apogee: 170 kilometres (110 mi)					
13 July; 14:47	(United States) Strongarm		(United States) Wallops Island		(United States) BRL	
13 July; 14:47		BRL	Suborbital	Ionospheric	13 July	Launch failure
13 July; 14:47	Apogee: 670 kilometres (420 mi)					
13 July	(Soviet Union) R-12 Dvina		(Soviet Union) Kapustin Yar		(Soviet Union) RVSN	
13 July		RVSN	Suborbital	Missile test	13 July	Successful
13 July	Apogee: 402 kilometres (250 mi)					
14 July; 00:44	(United States) Nike-Cajun		(United States) Wallops Island		(United States) NASA	
14 July; 00:44		NASA	Suborbital	Aeronomy	14 July	Launch failure
14 July; 00:44	Apogee: 28 kilometres (17 mi)					
14 July; 02:43	(United States) Strongarm		(United States) Wallops Island		(United States) BRL	
14 July; 02:43		BRL	Suborbital	Ionospheric	14 July	Launch failure
14 July; 02:43	Apogee: 710 kilometres (440 mi)					
14 July; 10:05	(United States) Nike-Cajun		(United States) Eglin		(United States) US Air Force	
14 July; 10:05	(United States) Firefly Frances	US Air Force	Suborbital	Aeronomy	14 July	Successful
14 July; 10:05	Apogee: 148 kilometres (92 mi)					
15 July; 06:10	(United States) UGM-27 Polaris A1		(United States) Cape Canaveral LC-25B		(United States) US Navy	
15 July; 06:10		US Navy	Suborbital	Missile test	15 July	Successful
15 July; 06:10	Apogee: 500 kilometres (310 mi)					
15 July; 10:02	(United States) Nike-Cajun		(United States) Eglin		(United States) US Air Force	
15 July; 10:02		US Air Force	Suborbital	Aeronomy	15 July	Successful
15 July; 10:02	Apogee: 120 kilometres (75 mi)					
15 July	(Soviet Union) R-11A Zemlya		(Soviet Union) Kapustin Yar		(Soviet Union) AN	
15 July		AN	Suborbital	Ionospheric	15 July	Successful
15 July	Apogee: 206 kilometres (128 mi)					
17 July; 04:11	(Japan) Kappa-8		(Japan) Akita		(Japan) ISAS	
17 July; 04:11		ISAS	Suborbital	Test flight	17 July	Successful
17 July; 04:11	Apogee: 182 kilometres (113 mi)					
18 July; 10:01	(United States) Nike-Cajun		(United States) Eglin		(United States) US Air Force	
18 July; 10:01	(United States) Firefly Carry	US Air Force	Suborbital	Aeronomy	18 July	Successful
18 July; 10:01	Apogee: 130 kilometres (81 mi)					
19 July; 16:00	(United States) UGM-27 Polaris A1		(United States) Cape Canaveral LC-25A		(United States) US Navy	
19 July; 16:00		US Navy	Suborbital	Missile test	19 July	Successful
19 July; 16:00	Apogee: 500 kilometres (310 mi)					
20 July; 17:39	(United States) UGM-27 Polaris A1		(United States) USS George Washington, ETR		(United States) US Navy	
20 July; 17:39		US Navy	Suborbital	Missile test	20 July	Successful
20 July; 17:39	Apogee: 500 kilometres (310 mi)					
20 July; 20:34	(United States) UGM-27 Polaris A1		(United States) USS George Washington, ETR		(United States) US Navy	
20 July; 20:34		US Navy	Suborbital	Missile test	20 July	Successful
20 July; 20:34	Apogee: 500 kilometres (310 mi)					
20 July	(United States) Nike-Cajun		(United States) Point Arguello LC-B		(United States) AEC	
20 July		AEC	Suborbital	Aeronomy	20 July	
20 July	Apogee: 120 kilometres (75 mi)					
20 July	(Soviet Union) R-5A Pobeda		(Soviet Union) Chelkar		(Soviet Union) RVSN	
20 July		RVSN	Suborbital	Target	20 July	Successful
20 July	Apogee: 500 kilometres (310 mi)					
21 July; 01:32	(United States) Nike-Cajun		(United States) Eglin		(United States) US Air Force	
21 July; 01:32	(United States) Firefly Ida	US Air Force	Suborbital	Aeronomy	21 July	Successful
21 July; 01:32	Apogee: 130 kilometres (81 mi)					
21 July; 10:02	(United States) Nike-Cajun		(United States) Eglin		(United States) US Air Force	
21 July; 10:02	(United States) Firefly Lily	US Air Force	Suborbital	Aeronomy	21 July	Successful
21 July; 10:02	Apogee: 151 kilometres (94 mi)					
22 July; 04:53	(United States) Nike-Cajun		(Canada) Fort Churchill		(United States) NASA	
22 July; 04:53		NASA	Suborbital	Auroral	22 July	Successful
22 July; 04:53	Apogee: 129 kilometres (80 mi)					
22 July; 10:11	(United States) Nike-Cajun		(United States) Eglin		(United States) US Air Force	
22 July; 10:11	(United States) Firefly Hedy	US Air Force	Suborbital	Aeronomy	22 July	Successful
22 July; 10:11	Apogee: 108 kilometres (67 mi)					
22 July; 12:05	(United States) Iris		(United States) Wallops Island LA-1		(United States) NASA	
22 July; 12:05		NASA	Suborbital	Aeronomy	22 July	Successful
22 July; 12:05	Apogee: 224 kilometres (139 mi)					
22 July; 23:46:16	(United States) SM-65D Atlas		(United States) Vandenberg LC-576B-1		(United States) US Air Force	
22 July; 23:46:16		US Air Force	Suborbital	Missile test	22 July	Launch failure
22 July; 23:46:16	Apogee: 20 kilometres (12 mi)					
23 July	(Soviet Union) (East Germany) R-2A		(Soviet Union) Kapustin Yar SP-2		(Soviet Union) NII-88	
23 July		NII-88	Suborbital	Target	23 July	Successful
23 July	Apogee: 100 kilometres (62 mi)					
24 July	(Soviet Union) R-12 Dvina		(Soviet Union) Kapustin Yar		(Soviet Union) RVSN	
24 July		RVSN	Suborbital	Missile test	24 July	Successful
24 July	Apogee: 402 kilometres (250 mi)					
25 July; 08:30	(United States) Nike-Cajun		(United States) Eglin		(United States) US Air Force	
25 July; 08:30		US Air Force	Suborbital	Aeronomy	25 July	Successful
25 July; 08:30	Apogee: 120 kilometres (75 mi)					
25 July; 11:54	(United Kingdom) Black Knight 201		(Australia) Woomera LA-5A		(United Kingdom) RAE	
25 July; 11:54		RAE	Suborbital	RV test	25 July	Successful
25 July; 11:54	Gaslight test, apogee: 531 kilometres (330 mi)					
26 July; 10:17	(United States) Nike-Cajun		(United States) Eglin		(United States) US Air Force	
26 July; 10:17	(United States) Firefly Janet	US Air Force	Suborbital	Aeronomy	26 July	Successful
26 July; 10:17	Apogee: 119 kilometres (74 mi)					
26 July; 16:00	(United States) MGM-31 Pershing I		(United States) Cape Canaveral LC-30A		(United States) US Army	
26 July; 16:00		US Army	Suborbital	Missile test	26 July	Successful
26 July; 16:00	Apogee: 250 kilometres (160 mi)					
26 July	(Soviet Union) R-12 Dvina		(Soviet Union) Kapustin Yar		(Soviet Union) RVSN	
26 July		RVSN	Suborbital	Missile test	26 July	Successful
26 July	Apogee: 402 kilometres (250 mi)					
27 July; 10:19	(United States) Nike-Cajun		(United States) Eglin		(United States) US Air Force	
27 July; 10:19	(United States) Firefly Dolly	US Air Force	Suborbital	Aeronomy	27 July	Successful
27 July; 10:19	Apogee: 115 kilometres (71 mi)					
27 July	(United States) Aerobee-300		(United States) Eglin		(United States) US Air Force	
27 July	(United States) Tattletale PCC-4	NSA	Suborbital	SIGNIT; Technology	27 July	Launch failure
27 July	Apogee: 5 kilometres (3.1 mi)					
28 July; 08:30:00	(United States) Nike-Cajun		(United States) Eglin		(United States) US Air Force	
28 July; 08:30:00	(United States) Firefly Amy	US Air Force	Suborbital	Aeronomy	28 July	
28 July; 08:30:00	Apogee: 111 kilometres (69 mi)					
28 July; 19:36	(Australia) Long Tom		(Australia) Woomera LA-2		(Australia) WRE	
28 July; 19:36		WRE	Suborbital	Aeronomy	28 July	Successful
28 July; 19:36	Apogee: 126 kilometres (78 mi)					
28 July; 21:38	(United States) HGM-25A Titan I		(United States) Cape Canaveral LC-20		(United States) US Air Force	
28 July; 21:38		US Air Force	Suborbital	RV test	28 June	Launch failure
28 July; 21:38	Apogee: 100 kilometres (62 mi)					
28 July	(Soviet Union) R-12 Dvina		(Soviet Union) Kapustin Yar		(Soviet Union) RVSN	
28 July		RVSN	Suborbital	Missile test	28 July	Successful
28 July	Apogee: 402 kilometres (250 mi)					
29 July; 13:13:03	(United States) Atlas LV-3B		(United States) Cape Canaveral LC-14		(United States) US Air Force	
29 July; 13:13:03	(United States) Mercury-Atlas 1	NASA	Suborbital	Test flight	29 July	Launch failure
29 July; 13:13:03	Maiden flight of Atlas LV-3B, structural failure during ascent. Apogee: 13 kilometres (8.1 mi)					
29 July	(Soviet Union) R-12 Dvina		(Soviet Union) Kapustin Yar		(Soviet Union) RVSN	
29 July		RVSN	Suborbital	Missile test	29 July	Successful
29 July	Apogee: 402 kilometres (250 mi)					
30 July; 20:20	(United States) UGM-27 Polaris A1		(United States) USS George Washington, ETR		(United States) US Navy	
30 July; 20:20		US Navy	Suborbital	Missile test	30 July	Successful
30 July; 20:20	Apogee: 500 kilometres (310 mi)					
31 July	(Soviet Union) (East Germany) R-2A		(Soviet Union) Kapustin Yar SP-2		(Soviet Union) NII-88	
31 July		NII-88	Suborbital	Target	31 July	Successful
31 July	Apogee: 100 kilometres (62 mi)					
July	(Soviet Union) R-12 Dvina		(Soviet Union) Kapustin Yar		(Soviet Union) RVSN	
July		RVSN	Suborbital	Missile test	July	Successful
July	Apogee: 402 kilometres (250 mi)					
July	(Soviet Union) R-12 Dvina		(Soviet Union) Kapustin Yar		(Soviet Union) RVSN	
July		RVSN	Suborbital	Missile test	July	Successful
July	Apogee: 402 kilometres (250 mi)					
July	(Soviet Union) R-12 Dvina		(Soviet Union) Kapustin Yar		(Soviet Union) RVSN	
July		RVSN	Suborbital	Missile test	July	Successful
July	Apogee: 402 kilometres (250 mi)					
July	(Soviet Union) R-12 Dvina		(Soviet Union) Kapustin Yar		(Soviet Union) RVSN	
July		RVSN	Suborbital	Missile test	July	Successful
July	Apogee: 402 kilometres (250 mi)					
July	(Soviet Union) R-5A Pobeda		(Soviet Union) Chelkar		(Soviet Union) RVSN	
July		RVSN	Suborbital	Target	July	Successful
July	Apogee: 500 kilometres (310 mi)					
July	(United States) Kiva-Hopi		(United States) Point Mugu		(United States) US Air Force	
July	(United States) Phoenix 5	US Air Force	Suborbital	Test flight	July	Successful
July	Apogee: 325 kilometres (202 mi)					
1 August; 08:30	(United States) Nike-Cajun		(United States) Eglin		(United States) US Air Force	
1 August; 08:30	(United States) Firefly Ruthy	US Air Force	Suborbital	Aeronomy	1 August	Successful
1 August; 08:30	Apogee: 113 kilometres (70 mi)					
1 August; 10:23	(United States) Nike-Cajun		(United States) Eglin		(United States) US Air Force	
1 August; 10:23	(United States) Firefly Hilda	US Air Force	Suborbital	Aeronomy	1 August	Successful
1 August; 10:23	Apogee: 126 kilometres (78 mi)					
1 August; 17:10	(United States) UGM-27 Polaris A1		(United States) USS George Washington, ETR		(United States) US Navy	
1 August; 17:10		US Navy	Suborbital	Missile test	1 August	Launch failure
1 August; 17:10	Apogee: 1 kilometre (0.62 mi)					
2 August; 03:14	(United States) Strongarm		(United States) Wallops Island		(United States) BRL	
2 August; 03:14		BRL	Suborbital	Ionospheric	2 August	Launch failure
2 August; 03:14	Apogee: 550 kilometres (340 mi)					
2 August; 13:30	(United States) Aerobee-150 (Hi)		(United States) White Sands LC-35		(United States) NRL	
2 August; 13:30		NRL	Suborbital	Ionospheric	2 August	Successful
2 August; 13:30	Apogee: 148 kilometres (92 mi)					
2 August	(Soviet Union) R-12 Dvina		(Soviet Union) Kapustin Yar		(Soviet Union) RVSN	
2 August		RVSN	Suborbital	Missile test	2 August	Launch failure
3 August; 15:26	(United States) Aerobee-300A		(United States) Wallops Island		(United States) NASA	
3 August; 15:26		UMI	Suborbital	Ionospheric	3 August	Successful
3 August; 15:26	Apogee: 415 kilometres (258 mi)					
4 August	(United States) UGM-27 Polaris A1		(United States) Cape Canaveral LC-25A		(United States) US Navy	
4 August		US Navy	Suborbital	Missile test	4 August	Successful
4 August	Apogee: 500 kilometres (310 mi)					
4 August	(Soviet Union) R-12 Dvina		(Soviet Union) Kapustin Yar		(Soviet Union) RVSN	
4 August		RVSN	Suborbital	Missile test	4 August	Successful
4 August	Apogee: 402 kilometres (250 mi)					
4 August	(Soviet Union) R-12 Dvina		(Soviet Union) Kapustin Yar		(Soviet Union) RVSN	
4 August		RVSN	Suborbital	Missile test	4 August	Successful
4 August	Apogee: 402 kilometres (250 mi)					
6 August; 09:00	(United States) Nike-Cajun		(United States) Eglin		(United States) US Air Force	
6 August; 09:00	(United States) Firefly Gerta	US Air Force	Suborbital	Aeronomy	6 August	Successful
6 August; 09:00	Apogee: 138 kilometres (86 mi)					
8 August; 10:15	(United States) Nike-Cajun		(United States) Eglin		(United States) US Air Force	
8 August; 10:15	(United States) Firefly Betsey	US Air Force	Suborbital	Aeronomy	8 August	Successful
8 August; 10:15	Apogee: 109 kilometres (68 mi)					
8 August	(Soviet Union) R-12 Dvina		(Soviet Union) Kapustin Yar		(Soviet Union) RVSN	
8 August		RVSN	Suborbital	Missile test	8 August	Successful
8 August	Apogee: 402 kilometres (250 mi)					
9 August; 18:09	(United States) SM-65D Atlas		(United States) Cape Canaveral LC-12		(United States) US Air Force	
9 August; 18:09		US Air Force	Suborbital	Missile test	9 August	Successful
9 August; 18:09	Apogee: 1,800 kilometres (1,100 mi)					
10 August; 10:35	(United States) Nike-Cajun		(United States) Eglin		(United States) US Air Force	
10 August; 10:35	(United States) Firefly Jeannie	US Air Force	Suborbital	Aeronomy	10 August	Successful
10 August; 10:35	Apogee: 104 kilometres (65 mi)					
10 August; 10:35	(United Kingdom) Skylark-2		(Australia) Woomera LA-2		(United Kingdom) RAE	
10 August; 10:35		UCL	Suborbital	Test flight	10 August	Successful
10 August; 10:35	Apogee: 171 kilometres (106 mi)					
10 August; 22:46	(United States) HGM-25A Titan I		(United States) Cape Canaveral LC-19		(United States) US Air Force	
10 August; 22:46		US Air Force	Suborbital	RV test	10 August	Successful
10 August; 22:46	Apogee: 1,000 kilometres (620 mi)					
10 August	(Soviet Union) R-12 Dvina		(Soviet Union) Kapustin Yar		(Soviet Union) RVSN	
10 August		RVSN	Suborbital	Missile test	10 August	Successful
10 August	Apogee: 402 kilometres (250 mi)					
10 August	(United States) Aerobee-300		(United States) Eglin		(United States) US Air Force	
10 August	(United States) Tattletale PCC-5	NSA	Suborbital	SIGNIT; Technology	10 August	Successful
10 August	Apogee: 383 kilometres (238 mi)					
10 August	(United States) Nike-Zeus		(United States) White Sands LC-38		(United States) US Army	
10 August		US Army	Suborbital	Test flight	10 August	Successful
10 August	Apogee: 150 kilometres (93 mi)					
11 August	(Soviet Union) R-12 Dvina		(Soviet Union) Kapustin Yar		(Soviet Union) RVSN	
11 August		RVSN	Suborbital	Missile test	11 August	Successful
11 August	Apogee: 402 kilometres (250 mi)					
12 August; 13:00	(United States) SM-65D Atlas		(United States) Cape Canaveral LC-11		(United States) US Air Force	
12 August; 13:00		US Air Force	Suborbital	Missile test	12 August	Successful
12 August; 13:00	Apogee: 1,800 kilometres (1,100 mi)					
12 August; 18:28	(United States) UGM-27 Polaris A1		(United States) Cape Canaveral LC-25A		(United States) US Navy	
12 August; 18:28		US Navy	Suborbital	Missile test	12 August	Successful
12 August; 18:28	Apogee: 500 kilometres (310 mi)					
12 August	(Soviet Union) R-12 Dvina		(Soviet Union) Kapustin Yar		(Soviet Union) RVSN	
12 August		RVSN	Suborbital	Missile test	12 August	Successful
12 August	Apogee: 402 kilometres (250 mi)					
12 August	(United States) Kiva-Hopi		(United States) Point Arguello LC-B		(United States) US Air Force	
12 August		US Air Force	Suborbital	Aeronomy	12 August	
12 August	Apogee: 300 kilometres (190 mi)					
13 August; 07:19	(United States) Viper-Falcon		(United States) Eglin		(United States) US Air Force	
13 August; 07:19	(United States) TP-Annie	US Air Force	Suborbital	Aeronomy	13 August	Successful
13 August; 07:19	Apogee: 120 kilometres (75 mi)					
15 August; 10:35	(United States) Honest John-Nike		(United States) Eglin		(United States) US Air Force	
15 August; 10:35	(United States) Firefly Lola	US Air Force	Suborbital	Aeronomy	15 August	Successful
15 August; 10:35	Apogee: 84 kilometres (52 mi)					
16 August; 01:42	(United States) Nike-Asp		(United States) Eglin		(United States) US Air Force	
16 August; 01:42	(United States) Firefly Arlene	US Air Force	Suborbital	Aeronomy	16 August	Successful
16 August; 01:42	Apogee: 104 kilometres (65 mi)					
16 August; 10:41	(United States) Nike-Cajun		(United States) Eglin		(United States) US Air Force	
16 August; 10:41	(United States) Firefly Peggy	US Air Force	Suborbital	Aeronomy	16 August	Successful
16 August; 10:41	Apogee: 103 kilometres (64 mi)					
17 August; 10:42	(United States) Nike-Cajun		(United States) Eglin		(United States) US Air Force	
17 August; 10:42	(United States) Firefly Susan	US Air Force	Suborbital	Aeronomy	17 August	Successful
17 August; 10:42	Apogee: 114 kilometres (71 mi)					
18 August; 01:35	(United States) Nike-Asp		(United States) Eglin		(United States) US Air Force	
18 August; 01:35		US Air Force	Suborbital	Aeronomy	18 August	Successful
18 August; 01:35	Apogee: 150 kilometres (93 mi)					
18 August; 02:42	(United States) Nike-Cajun		(United States) Eglin		(United States) US Air Force	
18 August; 02:42	(United States) Firefly Linda	US Air Force	Suborbital	Aeronomy	18 August	Successful
18 August; 02:42	Apogee: 133 kilometres (83 mi)					
18 August; 10:15	(United States) Nike-Asp		(United States) Eglin		(United States) US Air Force	
18 August; 10:15		US Air Force	Suborbital	Aeronomy	18 August	Successful
18 August; 10:15	Apogee: 150 kilometres (93 mi)					
19 August; 03:20	(United States) UGM-27 Polaris A1		(United States) Cape Canaveral LC-25A		(United States) US Navy	
19 August; 03:20		US Navy	Suborbital	Missile test	19 August	Successful
19 August; 03:20	Apogee: 500 kilometres (310 mi)					
19 August; 10:40	(United States) Nike-Cajun		(United States) Eglin		(United States) US Air Force	
19 August; 10:40	(United States) Firefly Olive	US Air Force	Suborbital	Aeronomy	19 August	Successful
19 August; 10:40	Apogee: 106 kilometres (66 mi)					
19 August; 19:56	(United States) Nike-Cajun		(United States) Eglin		(United States) US Air Force	
19 August; 19:56	(United States) Firefly Rena	US Air Force	Suborbital	Aeronomy	19 August	Successful
19 August; 19:56	Apogee: 105 kilometres (65 mi)					
20 August	(Soviet Union) R-12 Dvina		(Soviet Union) Kapustin Yar		(Soviet Union) RVSN	
20 August		RVSN	Suborbital	Missile test	20 August	Successful
20 August	Apogee: 402 kilometres (250 mi)					
22 August; 17:40:57	(United States) Nike-Asp		(United States) Wallops Island		(United States) NASA	
22 August; 17:40:57		GCA	Suborbital	Ionospheric	22 August	Launch failure
22 August; 17:40:57	Apogee: 23 kilometres (14 mi)					
23 August; 17:01	(United States) Aerobee-150A		(United States) Wallops Island		(United States) NASA	
23 August; 17:01		NYU	Suborbital	Cosmic ray research	23 August	Successful
23 August; 17:01	Apogee: 190 kilometres (120 mi)					
23 August; 17:10	(United States) Aerobee-150 (Hi)		(United States) White Sands LC-35		(United States) US Air Force	
23 August; 17:10		US Air Force	Suborbital	Solar	23 August	Successful
23 August; 17:10	Apogee: 237 kilometres (147 mi)					
25 August; 01:04	(United States) Nike-Asp		(United States) Eglin		(United States) US Air Force	
25 August; 01:04		US Air Force	Suborbital	Aeronomy	25 August	Successful
25 August; 01:04	Apogee: 200 kilometres (120 mi)					
25 August; 14:28	(United States) Honest John-Nike		(United States) Eglin		(United States) US Air Force	
25 August; 14:28	(United States) Firefly Zelda	US Air Force	Suborbital	Aeronomy	25 August	Successful
25 August; 14:28	Apogee: 102 kilometres (63 mi)					
26 August; 01:03	(United States) Nike-Asp		(United States) Eglin		(United States) US Air Force	
26 August; 01:03		US Air Force	Suborbital	Aeronomy	26 August	Successful
26 August; 01:03	Apogee: 150 kilometres (93 mi)					
26 August; 11:00	(United Kingdom) Skylark-2		(Australia) Woomera LA-2		(United Kingdom) RAE	
26 August; 11:00		QUB	Suborbital	Aeronomy	26 August	Successful
26 August; 11:00	Apogee: 109 kilometres (68 mi)					
29 August; 03:38	(United States) Trailblazer 1		(United States) Wallops Island		(United States) NASA	
29 August; 03:38		NASA	Suborbital	RV test	29 August	Successful
29 August; 03:38	Apogee: 260 kilometres (160 mi)					
29 August; 06:13	(United States) Trailblazer 1		(United States) Wallops Island		(United States) NASA	
29 August; 06:13		NASA	Suborbital	RV test	29 August	Successful
29 August; 06:13	Apogee: 260 kilometres (160 mi)					
30 August	(United States) Nike-Asp		(United States) Eglin		(United States) US Air Force	
30 August		US Air Force	Suborbital	Ionospheric	30 August	Launch failure
30 August	Apogee: 150 kilometres (93 mi)					
30 August	(United States) HGM-25A Titan I		(United States) Cape Canaveral LC-20		(United States) US Air Force	
30 August		US Air Force	Suborbital	RV test	30 August	Successful
30 August	Apogee: 1,000 kilometres (620 mi)					
31 August	(United States) Aerobee-300		(United States) Eglin		(United States) US Air Force	
31 August	(United States) Tattletale PCC-6	NSA	Suborbital	SIGNIT; Technology	31 August	Successful
31 August	Apogee: 100 kilometres (62 mi)					
August	(Soviet Union) R-12 Dvina		(Soviet Union) Kapustin Yar		(Soviet Union) RVSN	
August		RVSN	Suborbital	Missile test	August	Successful
August	Apogee: 402 kilometres (250 mi)					
August	(Soviet Union) R-12 Dvina		(Soviet Union) Kapustin Yar		(Soviet Union) RVSN	
August		RVSN	Suborbital	Missile test	August	Successful
August	Apogee: 402 kilometres (250 mi)					
August	(Soviet Union) R-14 Chusovaya		(Soviet Union) Kapustin Yar		(Soviet Union) RVSN	
August		RVSN	Suborbital	Missile test	August	Successful
August	Apogee: 675 kilometres (419 mi)					
August	(Soviet Union) R-14 Chusovaya		(Soviet Union) Kapustin Yar		(Soviet Union) RVSN	
August		RVSN	Suborbital	Missile test	August	Successful
August	Apogee: 675 kilometres (419 mi)					
August	(Soviet Union) R-14 Chusovaya		(Soviet Union) Kapustin Yar		(Soviet Union) RVSN	
August		RVSN	Suborbital	Missile test	August	Successful
August	Apogee: 675 kilometres (419 mi)					
August	(Soviet Union) R-13		(Soviet Union) Project 611 Submarine		(Soviet Union) RVSN	
August		RVSN	Suborbital	Missile test	August	Successful
August	Apogee: 150 kilometres (93 mi)					
2 September	(United States) UGM-27 Polaris A1		(United States) Cape Canaveral LC-25A		(United States) US Navy	
2 September		US Navy	Suborbital	Missile test	2 September	Successful
2 September	Apogee: 500 kilometres (310 mi)					
3 September; 14:08	(United States) Nike-Cajun		(Canada) Fort Churchill		(United States) NASA	
3 September; 14:08		NASA	Suborbital	Magnetospheric	3 September	Successful
3 September; 14:08	Apogee: 122 kilometres (76 mi)					
3 September; 17:29	(United States) Nike-Cajun		(Canada) Fort Churchill		(United States) NASA	
3 September; 17:29		NASA	Suborbital	Magnetospheric	3 September	Successful
3 September; 17:29	Apogee: 122 kilometres (76 mi)					
5 September	(Soviet Union) R-12 Dvina		(Soviet Union) Kapustin Yar		(Soviet Union) RVSN	
5 September		RVSN	Suborbital	Missile test	5 September	Successful
5 September	Apogee: 402 kilometres (250 mi)					
10 September	(Soviet Union) R-11FM Zemlya		(Soviet Union) B-67, Beloye More		(Soviet Union) VMF	
10 September		VMF	Suborbital	Missile test	10 September	Successful
10 September	Apogee: 200 kilometres (120 mi)					
12 September; 20:38:38	(United States) SM-65D Atlas		(United States) Vandenberg LC-576B-3		(United States) US Air Force	
12 September; 20:38:38		US Air Force	Suborbital	Missile test	12 September	Launch failure
12 September; 20:38:38	Apogee: 1,000 kilometres (620 mi)					
13 September; 17:55	(United States) UGM-27 Polaris A1		(United States) USS Patrick Henry, ETR		(United States) US Navy	
13 September; 17:55		US Navy	Suborbital	Missile test	13 September	Launch failure
15 September; 14:01	(United States) Aerobee-100		(United States) White Sands LC-35		(United States) US Air Force	
15 September; 14:01		US Air Force	Suborbital	Solar	15 September	Successful
15 September; 14:01	Apogee: 102 kilometres (63 mi)					
15 September; 21:28	(United States) UGM-27 Polaris A1		(United States) USS Patrick Henry, ETR		(United States) US Navy	
15 September; 21:28		US Navy	Suborbital	Missile test	15 September	Successful
15 September; 21:28	Apogee: 500 kilometres (310 mi)					
15 September	(Soviet Union) R-12 Dvina		(Soviet Union) Kapustin Yar		(Soviet Union) RVSN	
15 September		RVSN	Suborbital	Missile test	15 September	Successful
15 September	Apogee: 402 kilometres (250 mi)					
16 September	(Soviet Union) (East Germany) R-2A		(Soviet Union) Kapustin Yar		(Soviet Union) AN	
16 September		AN	Suborbital	Ionospheric	16 September	Successful
16 September	Apogee: 210 kilometres (130 mi)					
17 September; 00:50	(United States) SM-65D Atlas		(United States) Cape Canaveral LC-11		(United States) US Air Force	
17 September; 00:50		US Air Force	Suborbital	Missile test	17 September	Successful
17 September; 00:50	Apogee: 1,800 kilometres (1,100 mi)					
17 September	(Soviet Union) R-12 Dvina		(Soviet Union) Kapustin Yar		(Soviet Union) RVSN	
17 September		RVSN	Suborbital	Missile test	17 September	Successful
17 September	Apogee: 402 kilometres (250 mi)					
19 September; 16:35	(United States) Journeyman		(United States) Point Arguello LC-A		(United States) NASA	
19 September; 16:35	(United States) NERV-I	NASA	Suborbital	Cosmic ray research	19 September	Successful
19 September; 16:35	Apogee: 1,884 kilometres (1,171 mi)					
19 September; 18:31	(United States) SM-65D Atlas		(United States) Cape Canaveral LC-14		(United States) US Air Force	
19 September; 18:31		US Air Force	Suborbital	Missile test	19 September	Successful
19 September; 18:31	Apogee: 1,800 kilometres (1,100 mi)					
20 September; 00:16	(United States) Nike-Cajun		(Canada) Fort Churchill		(United States) US Air Force	
20 September; 00:16		US Air Force	Suborbital	Aeronomy	20 September	Launch failure
20 September; 12:55	(United States) Aerobee-150 (Hi)		(United States) White Sands LC-35		(United States) US Air Force	
20 September; 12:55		US Air Force	Suborbital	Aeronomy	20 September	Successful
20 September; 12:55	Apogee: 195 kilometres (121 mi)					
21 September; 13:01:53	(United States) XRM-91 Blue Scout Junior		(United States) Cape Canaveral LC-18A		(United States) US Air Force	
21 September; 13:01:53	(United States) HETS	US Air Force	Suborbital	Magnetospheric	21 September	Spacecraft failure
21 September; 13:01:53	Maiden flight of Blue Scout Junior, radio malfunction prevented data acquisition, apogee: 26,700 kilometres (16,600 mi)					
21 September; 23:20	(United States) Nike-Cajun		(Canada) Fort Churchill		(United States) US Air Force	
21 September; 23:20		BRL	Suborbital	Aeronomy	21 September	Launch failure
21 September; 23:20	Apogee: 1 kilometre (0.62 mi)					
21 September	(Soviet Union) R-11A Zemlya		(Soviet Union) Kapustin Yar		(Soviet Union) AN	
21 September		AN	Suborbital	Aeronomy	21 September	Successful
21 September	Apogee: 210 kilometres (130 mi)					
22 September; 06:32	(Japan) Kappa-8		(Japan) Akita		(Japan) ISAS	
22 September; 06:32		ISAS	Suborbital	Ionospheric	22 September	Successful
22 September; 06:32	Apogee: 200 kilometres (120 mi)					
22 September; 20:56	(Soviet Union) (East Germany) R-2A		(Soviet Union) Kapustin Yar		(Soviet Union) RVSN	
22 September; 20:56		RVSN	Suborbital	Ionospheric	22 September	Successful
22 September; 20:56	Apogee: 210 kilometres (130 mi)					
22 September; 22:05	(United States) UGM-27 Polaris A1		(United States) USS Patrick Henry, ETR		(United States) US Navy	
22 September; 22:05		US Navy	Suborbital	Missile test	22 September	Launch failure
22 September	(Soviet Union) R-12 Dvina		(Soviet Union) Kapustin Yar		(Soviet Union) RVSN	
22 September		RVSN	Suborbital	Missile test	22 September	Successful
22 September	Apogee: 402 kilometres (250 mi)					
23 September; 01:05	(United States) UGM-27 Polaris A1		(United States) USS Patrick Henry, ETR		(United States) US Navy	
23 September; 01:05		US Navy	Suborbital	Missile test	23 September	Launch failure
23 September; 06:40	(Canada) Black Brant I		(Canada) Fort Churchill		(Canada) CARDE	
23 September; 06:40		CARDE	Suborbital	Aeronomy	23 September	Successful
23 September; 06:40	Apogee: 100 kilometres (62 mi)					
23 September	(United States) UGM-27 Polaris A1		(United States) Cape Canaveral LC-25A		(United States) US Navy	
23 September		US Navy	Suborbital	Missile test	23 September	Successful
23 September	Apogee: 500 kilometres (310 mi)					
23 September	(Soviet Union) R-11A Zemlya		(Soviet Union) Kapustin Yar		(Soviet Union) AN	
23 September		AN	Suborbital	Ionospheric	23 September	Successful
23 September	Apogee: 200 kilometres (120 mi)					
24 September	(Soviet Union) R-12 Dvina		(Soviet Union) Kapustin Yar		(Soviet Union) RVSN	
24 September		RVSN	Suborbital	Missile test	24 September	Successful
24 September	Apogee: 402 kilometres (250 mi)					
26 September; 11:25	(Japan) Kappa-8		(Japan) Akita		(Japan) ISAS	
26 September; 11:25		ISAS	Suborbital	Ionospheric	26 September	Successful
26 September; 11:25	Apogee: 185 kilometres (115 mi)					
26 September	(France) OPd-56-39-22D (Antares)		(France) CERES		(France) ONERA	
26 September		ONERA	Suborbital	RV test	26 September	Successful
26 September	Apogee: 150 kilometres (93 mi)					
27 September; 14:44	(United States) Nike-Cajun		(Canada) Fort Churchill		(United States) NASA	
27 September; 14:44		NASA	Suborbital	Magnetospheric	27 September	Successful
27 September; 14:44	Apogee: 129 kilometres (80 mi)					
27 September; 22:10	(United States) Aerobee-150 (Hi)		(United States) White Sands LC-35		(United States) US Air Force	
27 September; 22:10		US Air Force	Suborbital	Aeronomy	27 September	Successful
27 September; 22:10	Apogee: 100 kilometres (62 mi)					
27 September; 22:10	(United States) Nike-Asp		(United States) Eglin		(United States) US Air Force	
27 September; 22:10			Suborbital	XR Astronomy	27 September	Successful
27 September; 22:10	Apogee: 233 kilometres (145 mi)					
28 September; 19:38	(United States) MGM-31 Pershing I		(United States) Cape Canaveral LC-30A		(United States) US Army	
28 September; 19:38		US Army	Suborbital	Missile test	28 September	Successful
28 September; 19:38	Apogee: 250 kilometres (160 mi)					
28 September; 22:45	(United States) Nike-Cajun		(Canada) Fort Churchill		(United States) US Air Force	
28 September; 22:45		BRL	Suborbital	Aeronomy	28 September	Successful
28 September; 22:45	Apogee: 105 kilometres (65 mi)					
28 September	(Soviet Union) R-12 Dvina		(Soviet Union) Kapustin Yar		(Soviet Union) RVSN	
28 September		RVSN	Suborbital	Missile test	28 September	Successful
28 September	Apogee: 402 kilometres (250 mi)					
28 September	(United States) HGM-25A Titan I		(United States) Cape Canaveral LC-19		(United States) US Air Force	
28 September		US Air Force	Suborbital	RV test	28 September	Successful
28 September	Apogee: 1,000 kilometres (620 mi)					
29 September; 14:20	(United States) HGM-25A Titan I		(United States) Cape Canaveral LC-15		(United States) US Air Force	
29 September; 14:20		US Air Force	Suborbital	RV test	29 September	Successful
29 September; 14:20	Apogee: 1,000 kilometres (620 mi)					
29 September; 20:31:11	(United States) SM-65D Atlas		(United States) Vandenberg LC-576B-2		(United States) US Air Force	
29 September; 20:31:11		US Air Force	Suborbital	Missile test	29 September	Launch failure
29 September; 20:31:11	Apogee: 500 kilometres (310 mi)					
29 September	(Soviet Union) R-12 Dvina		(Soviet Union) Kapustin Yar		(Soviet Union) RVSN	
29 September		RVSN	Suborbital	Missile test	29 September	Successful
29 September	Apogee: 402 kilometres (250 mi)					
30 September; 06:17	(Canada) Black Brant I		(Canada) Fort Churchill		(Canada) CARDE	
30 September; 06:17		CARDE	Suborbital	Aeronomy	30 September	Successful
30 September; 06:17	Apogee: 100 kilometres (62 mi)					
30 September	(Soviet Union) R-12 Dvina		(Soviet Union) Kapustin Yar		(Soviet Union) RVSN	
30 September		RVSN	Suborbital	Missile test	30 September	Successful
30 September	Apogee: 402 kilometres (250 mi)					
30 September	(Soviet Union) R-12 Dvina		(Soviet Union) Kapustin Yar		(Soviet Union) RVSN	
30 September		RVSN	Suborbital	Missile test	30 September	Successful
30 September	Apogee: 402 kilometres (250 mi)					
30 September	(France) OPd-56-39-22D (Antares)		(France) CERES		(France) ONERA	
30 September		ONERA	Suborbital	RV test	30 September	Successful
30 September	Apogee: 150 kilometres (93 mi)					
September	(Soviet Union) R-14 Chusovaya		(Soviet Union) Kapustin Yar		(Soviet Union) RVSN	
September		RVSN	Suborbital	Missile test	September	Successful
September	Apogee: 675 kilometres (419 mi)					
September	(Soviet Union) R-14 Chusovaya		(Soviet Union) Kapustin Yar		(Soviet Union) RVSN	
September		RVSN	Suborbital	Missile test	September	Successful
September	Apogee: 675 kilometres (419 mi)					
September	(Soviet Union) (East Germany) R-2		(China) Jiuquan LA-3		(China) PLA	
September		PLA	Suborbital	Missile test	September	Successful
September	First Chinese spaceflight, apogee: 100 kilometres (62 mi)					
