= Discoverer 18 =

Reconnaissance satellite

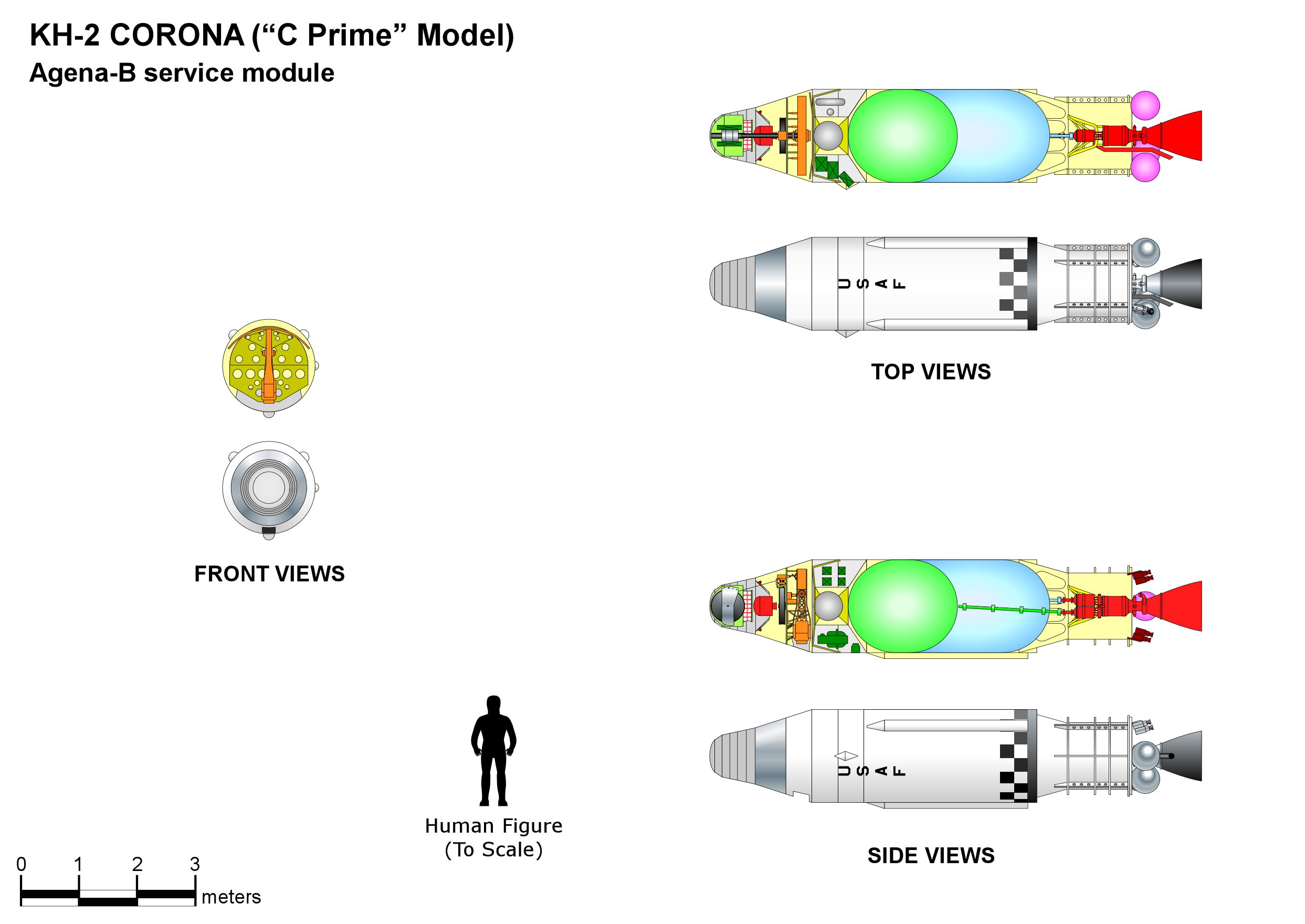
- Mission type: Optical reconnaissance
- Operator: US Air Force / NRO
- Harvard designation: 1960 Sigma 1
- COSPAR ID: 1960-018A
- SATCAT no.: 00067

Spacecraft properties
- Spacecraft type: Corona KH-2
- Bus: Agena-B
- Manufacturer: Lockheed
- Launch mass: 1,240 kilograms (2,730 lb)

Start of mission
- Launch date: 7 December 1960, 20:24:00 GMT
- Rocket: Thor DM-21 Agena-B (Thor 296)
- Launch site: Vandenberg, LC 75-3-4

End of mission
- Decay date: 2 April 1961

Orbital parameters
- Reference system: Geocentric
- Regime: Low Earth
- Perigee altitude: 243 kilometers (151 mi)
- Apogee altitude: 661 kilometers (411 mi)
- Inclination: 81.5°
- Period: 93.66 minutes

Discoverer 18, also known as Corona 9013, was an American optical reconnaissance satellite launched on 7 December 1960 at 20:24:00 GMT. It was the first successful, and the third of ten total Corona KH-2 satellites, based on the Agena-B.

== Background ==
Discoverer 18 was the third of the KH-2 Corona spy satellites, which was distinguished from the predecessor KH-1 series in its incorporation of the improved C' camera, which replaced the C model carried on KH-1 missions. The improved camera had variable image motion compensation so that its carrying satellites could be flown in differing orbits. Like the C camera, the C' was manufactured by Fairchild Camera and Instrument under the supervision of Itek, a defense contractor that specialized in making cameras for spy satellites. The satellite also carried a Transit on Discoverer (TOD) payload

Discoverer 16, the first of the KH-2 series, had failed to reach orbit after its launch on 26 October 1960.

Discoverer 17, the second of the KH-2 series launched successfully on 12 November 1960 but suffered a payload malfunction.

== Mission ==
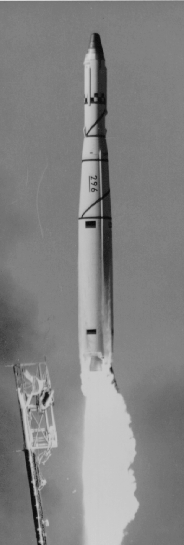
The launch of Discoverer 18.

The launch of Discoverer 18 occurred at 20:24:00 GMT on 7 December 1960. A Thor DM-21 Agena-B rocket was used, flying from LC 75-3-4 at the Vandenberg Air Force Base. Upon successfully reaching orbit, it was assigned the Harvard designation 1960 Sigma 1.

Discoverer 18 was operated in a low Earth orbit, with a perigee of 243 kilometres (151 mi), an apogee of 661 kilometres (411 mi), 81.5° of inclination, and a period of 93.66 minutes. The satellite had a mass of 1,240 kilograms (2,730 lb), and was equipped with a panoramic camera with a focal length of 61 centimetres (24 in), which had a maximum resolution of 7.6 metres (25 ft). Images were recorded onto 70-millimeter (2.8 in) film, and returned in a Satellite Recovery Vehicle (SRV), which was recovered three days after the launch. The Satellite Recovery Vehicle used by Discoverer 18 was SRV-508.

Discoverer 18 was placed in a near-polar orbit to test spacecraft engineering techniques, to continue the evaluation of the Agena B vehicle, and to attempt separation, deceleration, reentry through the atmosphere, and recovery from the air of an instrument package.

The cylindrical Agena B stage carried a telemetry system, tape recorder, receivers for command signals from the ground, a horizon scanner, and a 136 kilograms (300 lb) recovery capsule. The capsule was a bowl-shaped configuration 84 centimetres (33 in) in diameter and 69 centimetres (27 in) deep. A conical afterbody increased the total length to about 101 centimetres (40 in). The recovery capsule payload included the photographic film packs, nuclear track plates, and biological specimens. A Thiokol retrorocket was mounted at the end of the afterbody to decelerate the capsule out of orbit. An 18 kilograms (40 lb) monitoring system was included in the capsule to report on selected events, such as the firing of the retrorocket, jettisoning of the heat shield, and others.

Discoverer 18 was launched during a massive solar flare which lasted for the first 13 hours of the 48-orbit, 3-day flight. After the 48th orbit, the recovery capsule was ejected, reentered the atmosphere, and was retrieved in mid-air near Hawaii by a C-119 plane. The Agena B stage remained in orbit until 2 April 1961, when it reentered the atmosphere and burned up.

== Scientific results ==
In addition to its reconnaissance payload, Discoverer 18 carried a biological research payload, intended to investigate human tissues in space. Since at the time the United States did not publicly acknowledge its reconnaissance satellite programs, this was officially the satellite's primary mission. The satellite's scientific experiment package of radiation dosimeters, infrared radiometers, and microwave band detectors was identical to that of Discoverer 17, with the addition of photographic film packs sensitive to neutrons, x-rays and gamma rays, and nuclear track plates. The spacecraft carried external lights (approximately a sixth to seventh magnitude star) for optical tracking from ground camera stations.

The onboard film pack "Nuclear Emulsion" experiment comprised two groups of films coated with nuclear emulsions, arranged horizontally and vertically, were used to measure the intensity and direction of cosmic radiation and to distinguish among electrons, protons, and heavier charged particles. These emulsions were sensitive to neutrons, x-rays, and gamma rays. Nuclear track plates were also included in the experiment package. Neutron density was measured by changes induced in a metallic bismuth detector. The experiment was contained in the recovery capsule, which was retrieved in mid-air after 48 orbits.

Discoverer 18 also carried a biological package including Neurospora conidia, nerve tissue, algae, human bone marrow, eyelid tissue, gamma globulin, and cancer cells. Results from the flight suggested that biological specimens might withstand radiation from solar flares with a minimum of shielding and that aluminum shielding seemed to offer more protection than lead.
