= Discoverer 17 =

Reconnaissance satellite

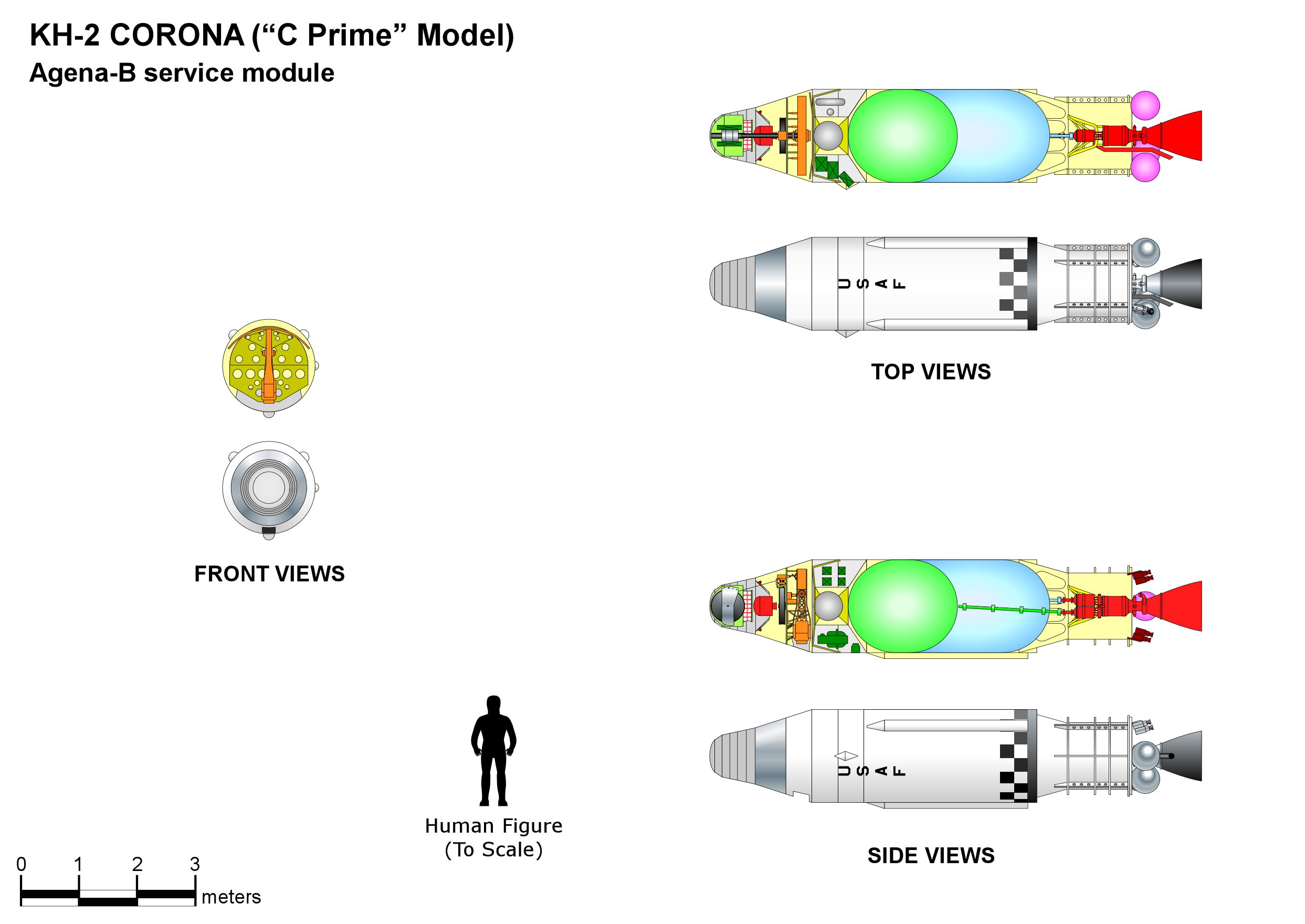
- Mission type: Optical reconnaissance
- Operator: US Air Force / NRO
- Harvard designation: 1960 Omicron 1
- COSPAR ID: 1960-015A
- SATCAT no.: 00061
- Mission duration: 2 days

Spacecraft properties
- Spacecraft type: Corona KH-2
- Bus: Agena-B
- Manufacturer: Lockheed
- Launch mass: 1,091 kilograms (2,405 lb)

Start of mission
- Launch date: 12 November 1960, 20:38:00 GMT
- Rocket: Thor DM-21 Agena-B (Thor 297)
- Launch site: Vandenberg, LC 75-3-5

End of mission
- Decay date: 29 December 1960

Orbital parameters
- Reference system: Geocentric
- Regime: Low Earth
- Perigee altitude: 190 kilometers (120 mi)
- Apogee altitude: 984 kilometers (611 mi)
- Inclination: 81.8°
- Period: 96.45 minutes

Discoverer 17, also known as Corona 9012, was an American optical reconnaissance satellite launched on 12 November 1960 at 20:38:00 GMT. It was the second of ten Corona KH-2 satellites, based on the Agena-B.

== Background ==
Discoverer 17 was the second of the KH-2 Corona spy satellites, which was distinguished from the predecessor KH-1 series in its incorporation of the improved C' camera, which replaced the C model carried on KH-1 missions. The improved camera had variable image motion compensation so that its carrying satellites could be flown in differing orbits. Like the C camera, the C' was manufactured by Fairchild Camera and Instrument under the supervision of Itek, a defense contractor that specialized in making cameras for spy satellites. The satellite also carried a Transit on Discoverer (TOD) payload

Discoverer 16, the first of the KH-2 series, had failed to reach orbit after its launch on 26 October 1960.

== Mission ==
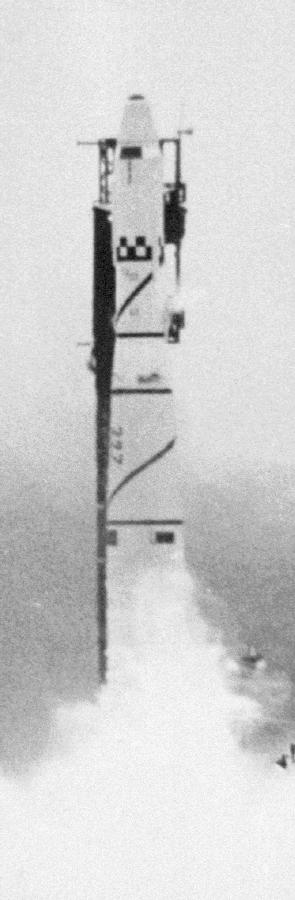
The launch of Discoverer 17.

The launch of Discoverer 17 occurred at 20:38:00 GMT on 12 November 1960. A Thor DM-21 Agena-B rocket was used, flying from LC 75-3-5 at the Vandenberg Air Force Base. Upon successfully reaching orbit, it was assigned the Harvard designation 1960 Omicron 1. It was the first KH-2 satellite to successfully reach orbit.

Discoverer 17 was operated in a low Earth orbit, with a perigee of 190 kilometres (120 mi), an apogee of 984 kilometres (611 mi), 81.8° of inclination, and a period of 96.45 minutes. The satellite had a mass of 1,091 kilograms (2,405 lb), and was equipped with a panoramic camera with a focal length of 61 centimetres (24 in), which had a maximum resolution of 7.6 metres (25 ft). Images were recorded onto 70-millimeter (2.8 in) film, and returned in a Satellite Recovery Vehicle (SRV). The Satellite Recovery Vehicle used by Discoverer 17 was SRV-507.

Shortly after Discoverer 17 began operations, its SRV separated prematurely. Two days after launch it was deorbited and recovered, however only 52 centimetres (20 in) of film was found to be aboard, and no images were taken. Following the separation of the SRV, Discoverer 17 remained in orbit until it decayed on 29 December 1960.

== Science Results ==
In addition to its reconnaissance payload, Discoverer 17 carried a biological research payload, intended to investigate human tissues in space. Since at the time the United States did not publicly acknowledge its reconnaissance satellite programs, this was officially the satellite's primary mission. Unexpectedly high radiation levels during the flight led to the data from this experiment being considered particularly valuable by US Air Force scientists. Nevertheless, "samples of human gamma globulin and rabbit antiserum specific for human gamma globulin showed an increase in reactivity, and samples of synovial and conjunctival cells showed no changes in their cytological characteristics."
