= Discoverer 19 =

Reconnaissance satellite

- Mission type: Technology
- Operator: US Air Force/ARPA
- Harvard designation: 1960 Tau 1
- COSPAR ID: 1960-019A
- SATCAT no.: 00068

Spacecraft properties
- Bus: Agena-B
- Manufacturer: Lockheed
- Launch mass: 1,060 kilograms (2,340 lb)

Start of mission
- Launch date: 20 December 1960, 20:32 UTC
- Rocket: Thor DM-21 Agena-B 258
- Launch site: Vandenberg LC-75-3-5

End of mission
- Decay date: 23 January 1961

Orbital parameters
- Reference system: Geocentric
- Regime: Low Earth
- Perigee altitude: 206 kilometers (128 mi)
- Apogee altitude: 578 kilometers (359 mi)
- Inclination: 83.4 degrees
- Period: 92.4 minutes

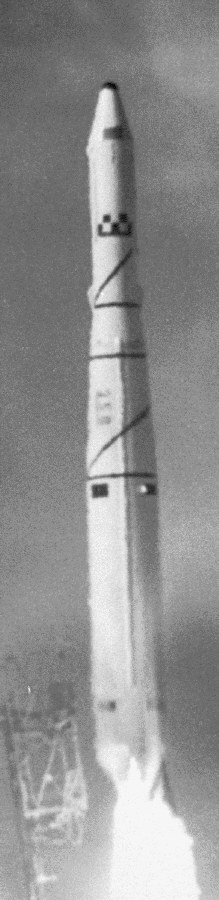
The launch of Discoverer 19

Discoverer 19, also known as RM-1, was an American satellite which was launched in 1960. It was a technology demonstration spacecraft, based on an Agena-B.

The launch of Discoverer 19 occurred at 20:32 UTC on 20 December 1960. A Thor DM-21 Agena-B rocket was used, flying from Launch Complex 75-3-5 at the Vandenberg Air Force Base. Upon successfully reaching orbit, it was assigned the Harvard designation 1960 Tau 1.

Discoverer 19 was operated in a low Earth orbit, with a perigee of 206 kilometres (128 mi), an apogee of 578 kilometres (359 mi), 83.4 degrees of inclination, and a period of 92.4 minutes. The satellite had a mass of 1,060 kilograms (2,340 lb), and was used to demonstrate technology for the Midas programme, including infrared sensors. Communication with the satellite was lost on Christmas Day 1960. It remained in orbit until 23 January 1961, when it decayed and reentered the atmosphere.
