= Discoverer 16 =

Reconnaissance satellite

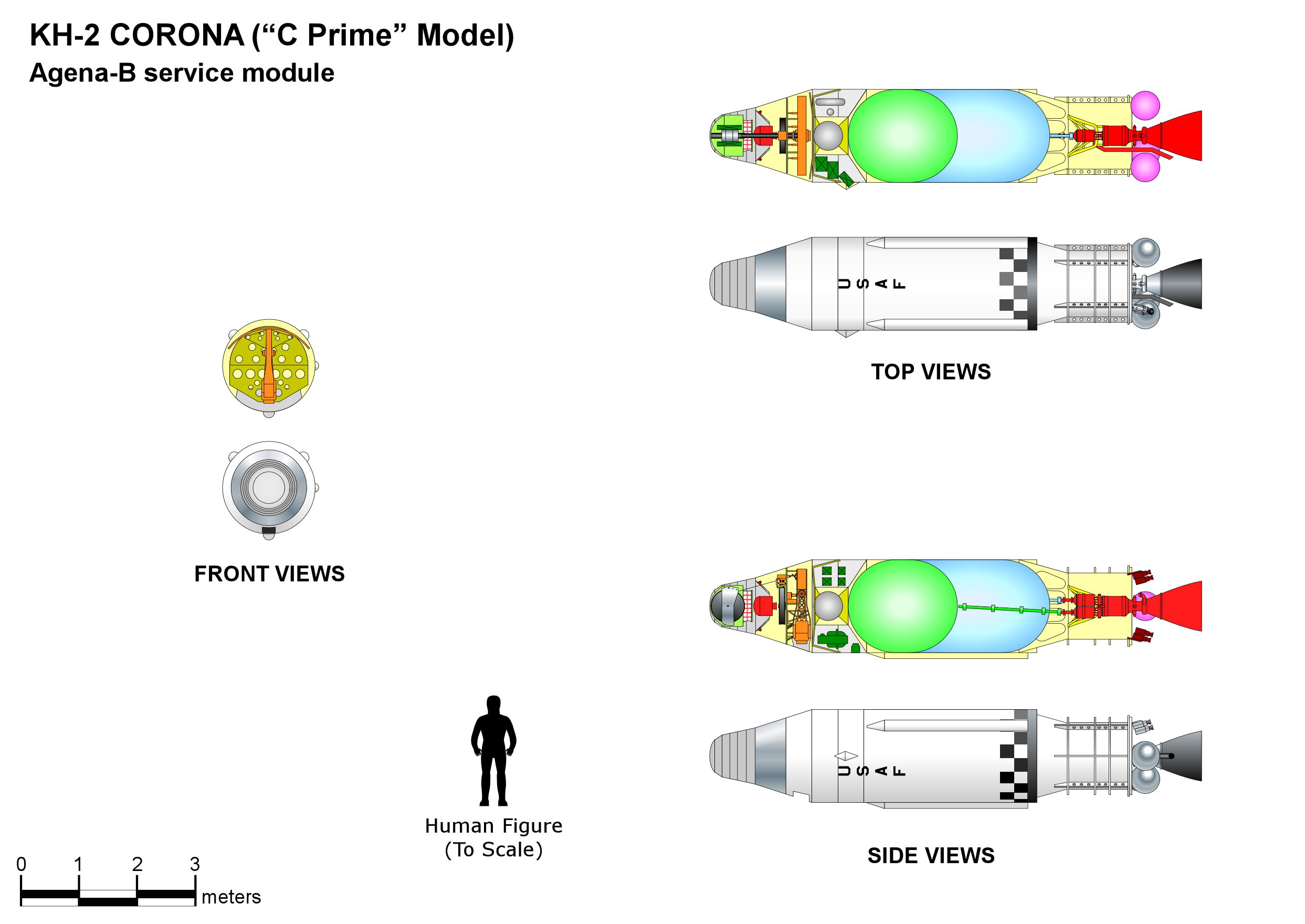
- Mission type: Optical reconnaissance
- Operator: US Air Force/NRO
- Mission duration: Failed to orbit

Spacecraft properties
- Spacecraft type: Corona KH-2
- Bus: Agena-B
- Manufacturer: Lockheed
- Launch mass: 1,091 kilograms (2,405 lb)

Start of mission
- Launch date: 26 October 1960, 20:26 UTC
- Rocket: Thor DM-21 Agena-B 253
- Launch site: Vandenberg LC-75-3-4

Orbital parameters
- Reference system: Geocentric
- Regime: Low Earth
- Epoch: Planned

Discoverer 16, also known as Corona 9011, was an American optical reconnaissance satellite which was lost in a launch failure on 26 October 1960. It was the first of ten Corona KH-2 satellites, based on the Agena-B.

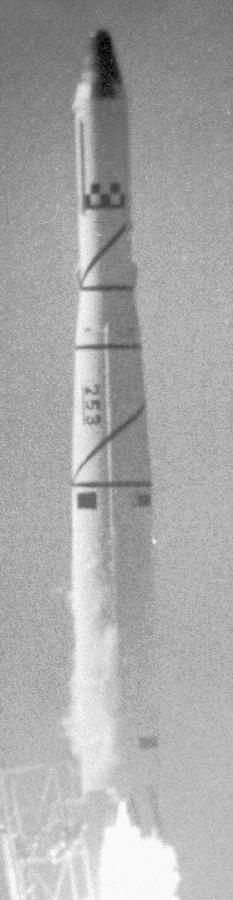
Thor Agena B with Discoverer 16

The launch of Discoverer 16 occurred at 20:26 UTC on 26 October 1960. A Thor DM-21 Agena-B rocket was used, flying from Launch Complex 75-3-4 at the Vandenberg Air Force Base.The launch was close to nominal through Thor phase; Thor VECO occurred almost simultaneous with MECO and the planned 16 second vernier solo phase did not occur. Agena staging did not occur and the Agena, still attached to the spent Thor, fell into the Pacific. The cause of the mishap was traced to a momentary power interruption at launch that reset a timer on the Agena, consequently no programmer functions were entered.

Discoverer 16 was intended to have been operated in a low Earth orbit. It had a mass of 1,091 kilograms (2,405 lb), and was equipped with a panoramic camera with a focal length of 61 centimetres (24 in), which had a maximum resolution of 7.6 metres (25 ft). It was to have recorded images onto 70-millimeter (2.8 in) film, which would have been returned in a Satellite Recovery Vehicle. The Satellite Recovery Vehicle aboard Discoverer 16 was SRV-506.
