= Pioneer 12 =

Pioneer 12 was the twelfth mission of the Pioneer program. It was a designation given to two different missions:

- Pioneer H, a planned mission to the Sun that was canceled and resulted in the spacecraft being put in the Air and Space Museum as a replica of the Pioneer 10 and Pioneer 11 probes.
- Pioneer Venus Orbiter, a mission to Venus from 1978 to October 1992, officially designated Pioneer 12.
