= Pioneer program =

Series of United States uncrewed lunar and planetary space probes (1958-60; 1965-92)

Pioneer Program
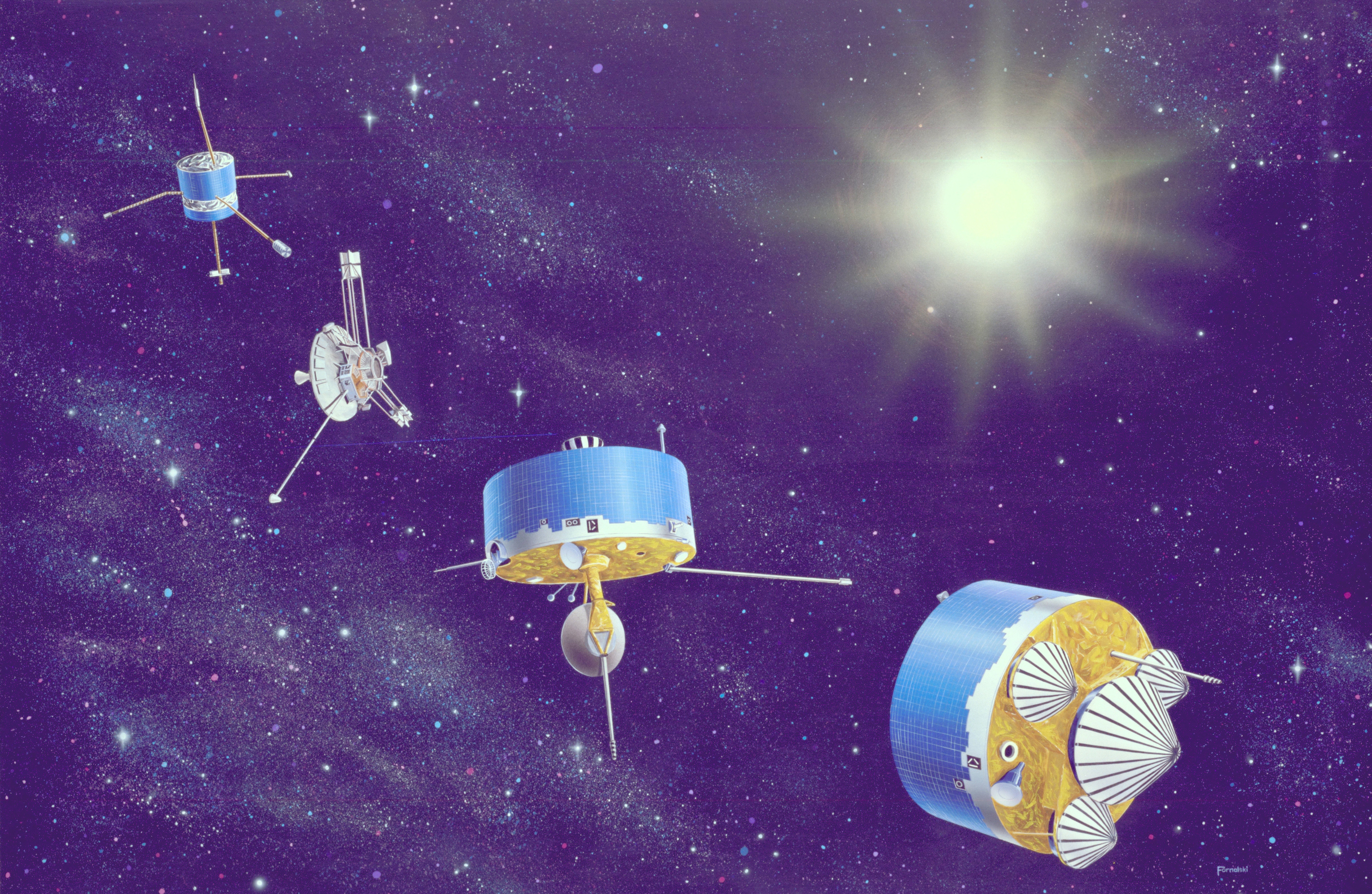
- A family portrait showing (from left to right) Pioneers 6-9, 10 and 11 and the Pioneer Venus Orbiter and Multiprobe series

Program overview
- Country: United States
- Organization: Air Force Ballistic Missile Division; United States Army; NASA
- Purpose: Lunar and interplanetary exploration
- Status: Completed

Program history
- Duration: 1958–1960; 1965–1992
- First flight: Pioneer 0 (17 August 1958)
- Last flight: Pioneer Venus (August 1978)
- Successes: 9
- Failures: 10
- Partial failures: 1
- Launch site: Cape Canaveral Air Force Station

Vehicle information
- Launch vehicles: Thor-Able; Atlas-Able; Juno II; Delta E; Atlas-Centaur

The Pioneer programs were two series of United States lunar and planetary space probes. The first program, which ran from 1958 to 1960, unsuccessfully attempted to send spacecraft to orbit the Moon, successfully sent one spacecraft to fly by the Moon, and successfully sent one spacecraft to investigate interplanetary space between the orbits of Earth and Venus. The second program, which ran from 1965 to 1992, sent four spacecraft to measure interplanetary space weather, two to explore Jupiter and Saturn, and two to explore Venus. The two outer planet probes, Pioneer 10 and Pioneer 11, became the first two of five artificial objects to achieve the escape velocity that will allow them to leave the Solar System, and carried a golden plaque each depicting a man and a woman and information about the origin and the creators of the probes, in case any extraterrestrials find them someday.

== Naming ==
Credit for naming the first probe has been attributed to Stephen A. Saliga, who had been assigned to the Air Force Orientation Group, Wright-Patterson AFB, as chief designer of Air Force exhibits. While he was at a briefing, the spacecraft was described to him, as, a "lunar-orbiting vehicle, with an infrared scanning device." Saliga thought the title too long, and lacked theme for an exhibit design. He suggested, "Pioneer", as the name of the probe, since "the Army had already launched and orbited the Explorer satellite, and their Public Information Office was identifying the Army, as, 'Pioneers in Space,'" and, by adopting the name, the Air Force would "make a 'quantum jump' as to who, really, [were] the 'Pioneers' in space.'"

== Early missions ==
The earliest missions were attempts to achieve Earth's escape velocity, simply to show it was feasible and to study the Moon. This included the first launch by NASA which was formed from the old NACA. These missions were carried out by the Air Force Ballistic Missile Division, Army, and NASA.

=== Able space probes (1958–1960) ===
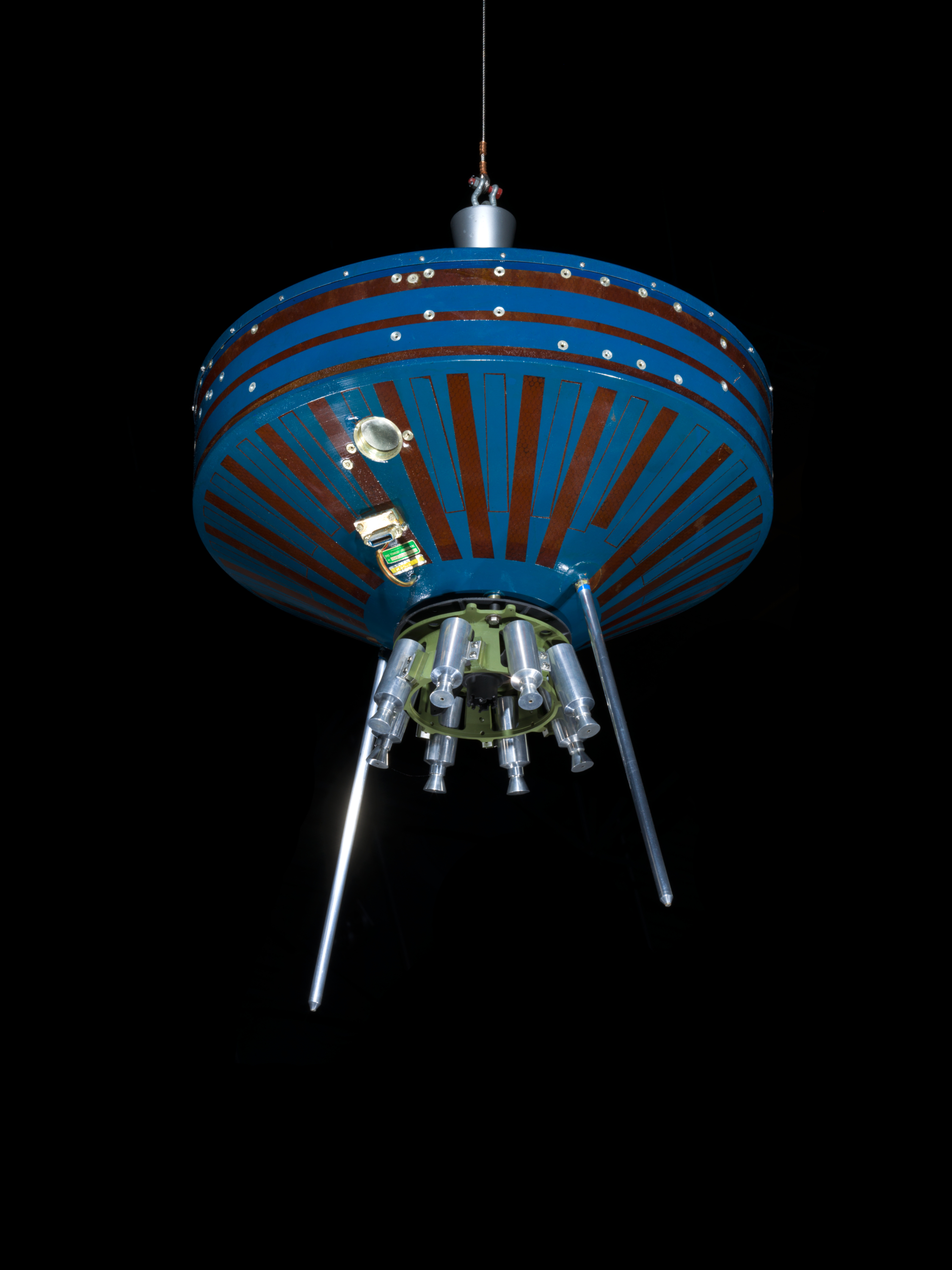
Reconstructed replica of Pioneer 1

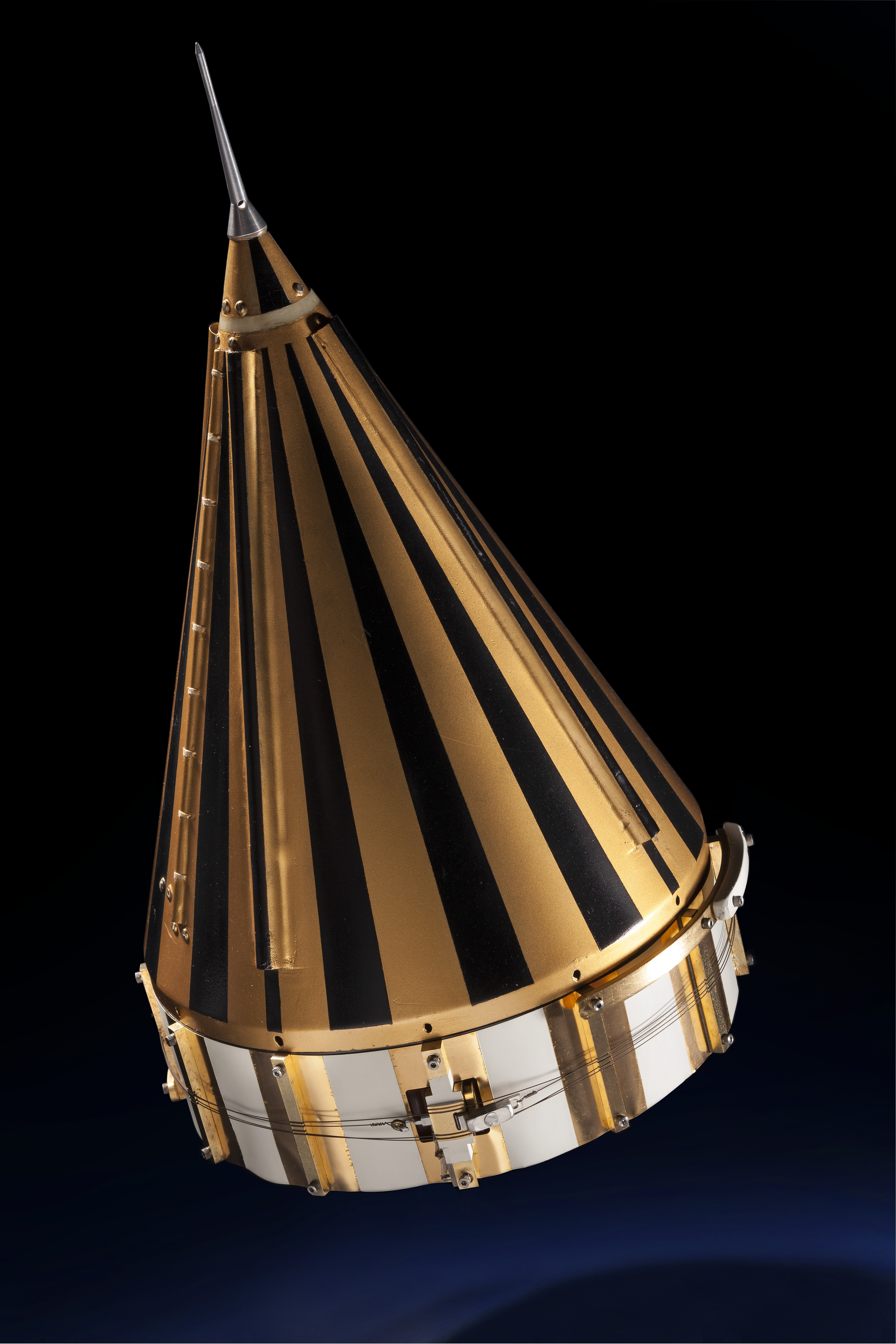
Lunar flyby spacecraft (Pioneer 3, 4)

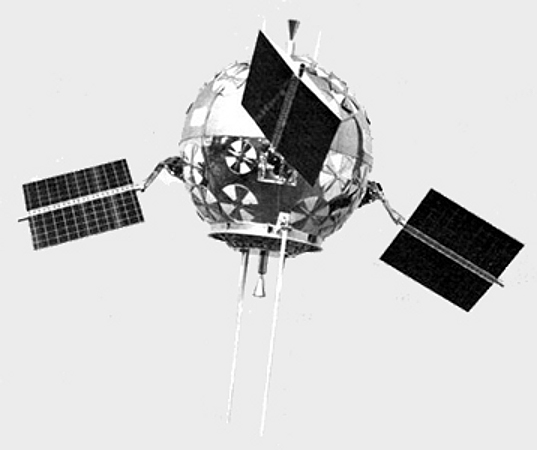
Pioneer P-1, P-3, 5, P-30, and P-31 probe

Mission Name	Alternate Names	Type	Outcome	Date
Pioneer 0	Thor-Able 1, Pioneer	Lunar orbiter	Destroyed (Thor failure 77 seconds after launch)	August 17, 1958
Pioneer 1	Thor-Able 2, Pioneer I	Lunar orbiter, missed Moon	Third stage partial failure	October 11, 1958
Pioneer 2	Thor-Able 3, Pioneer II	Lunar orbiter, reentry	Third stage failure	November 8, 1958
Pioneer P-1	Atlas-Able 4A, Pioneer W		Launch vehicle lost	September 24, 1959
Pioneer P-3	Atlas-Able 4, Atlas-Able 4B, Pioneer X		Mission failed shortly after launch	November 26, 1959
Pioneer 5	Pioneer P-2, Thor-Able 4, Pioneer V			March 11, 1960
Pioneer P-30	Atlas-Able 5A, Pioneer Y	Lunar probe	Failed to achieve lunar orbit	September 25, 1960
Pioneer P-31	Atlas-Able 5B, Pioneer Z	Lunar probe	Lost in upper stage failure	December 15, 1960

=== Juno II lunar probes (1958–1959) ===
- Pioneer 3 – Lunar flyby, missed Moon due to launcher failure December 6, 1958
- Pioneer 4 – Lunar flyby, achieved Earth escape velocity, launched March 3, 1959

== Later missions (1965–1978) ==
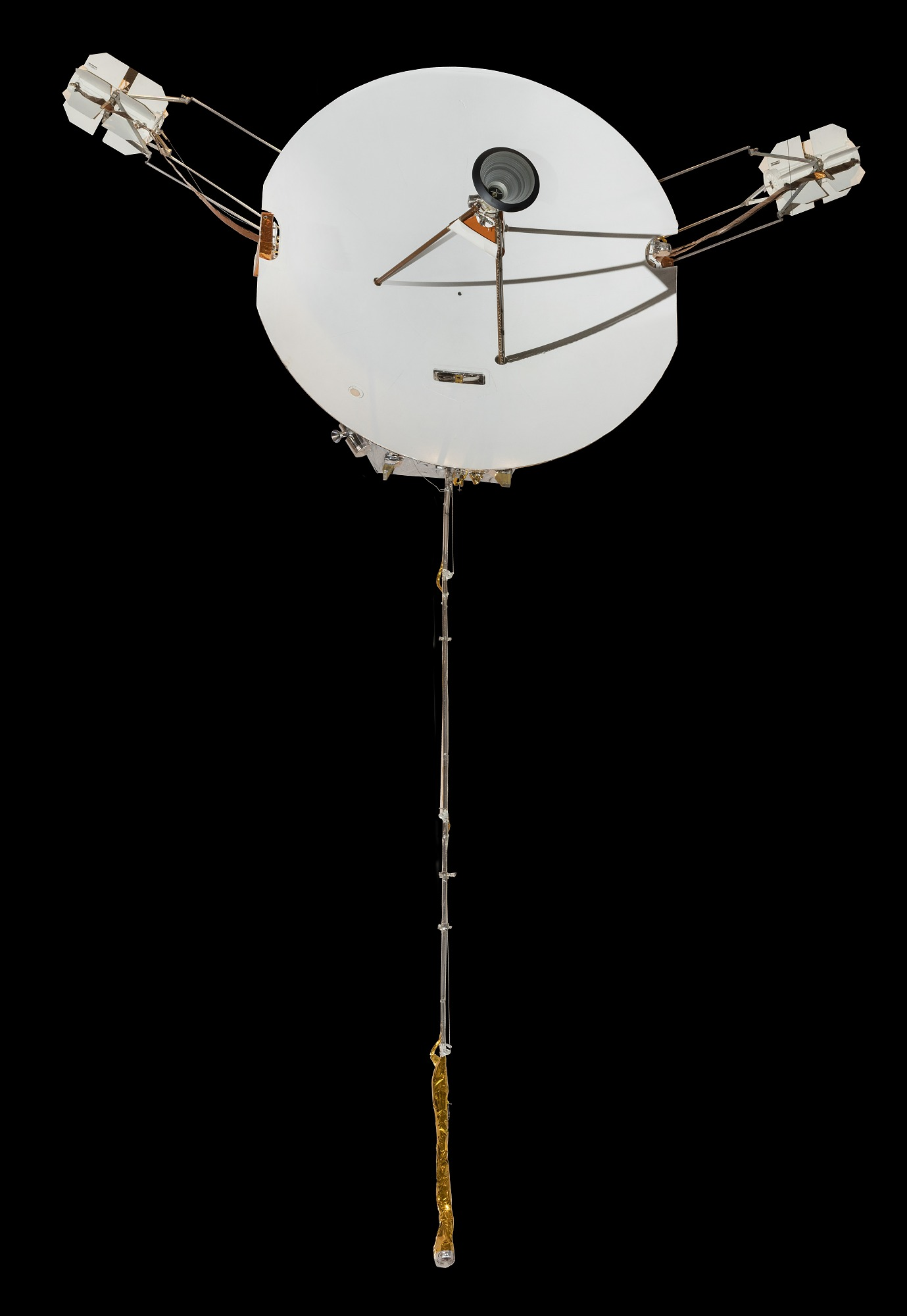
Pioneer 10 / 11

Five years after the early Able space probe missions ended, NASA Ames Research Center used the Pioneer name for a new series of missions, initially aimed at the inner Solar System, before the flyby missions to Jupiter and Saturn. While successful, the missions returned much poorer images than the Voyager program probes would five years later. In 1978, the end of the program saw a return to the inner Solar System, with the Pioneer Venus Orbiter and Multiprobe, this time using orbital insertion rather than flyby missions.

The new missions were numbered beginning with Pioneer 6 (alternate names in parentheses).

=== Interplanetary weather ===
The spacecraft in Pioneer missions 6, 7, 8, and 9 comprised a new interplanetary space weather network:

- Pioneer 6 (Pioneer A) – launched December 1965
- Pioneer 7 (Pioneer B) – launched August 1966
- Pioneer 8 (Pioneer C) – launched December 1967
- Pioneer 9 (Pioneer D) – launched November 1968 (inactive since 1983)
- Pioneer E – lost in launcher failure August 1969

Pioneer 6 and Pioneer 9 are in solar orbits with 0.8 AU distance to the Sun. Their orbital periods are therefore slightly shorter than Earth's. Pioneer 7 and Pioneer 8 are in solar orbits with 1.1 AU distance to the Sun. Their orbital periods are therefore slightly longer than Earth's. Since the probes' orbital periods differ from that of the Earth, from time to time, they face a side of the Sun that cannot be seen from Earth. The probes can sense parts of the Sun several days before the Sun's rotation reveals it to ground-based Earth orbiting observatories.

=== Outer Solar System missions ===
Map showing location and trajectories of the Pioneer 10 (blue), Pioneer 11 (green), Voyager 1 (purple) and Voyager 2 (red) spacecraft, as of April 4, 2007

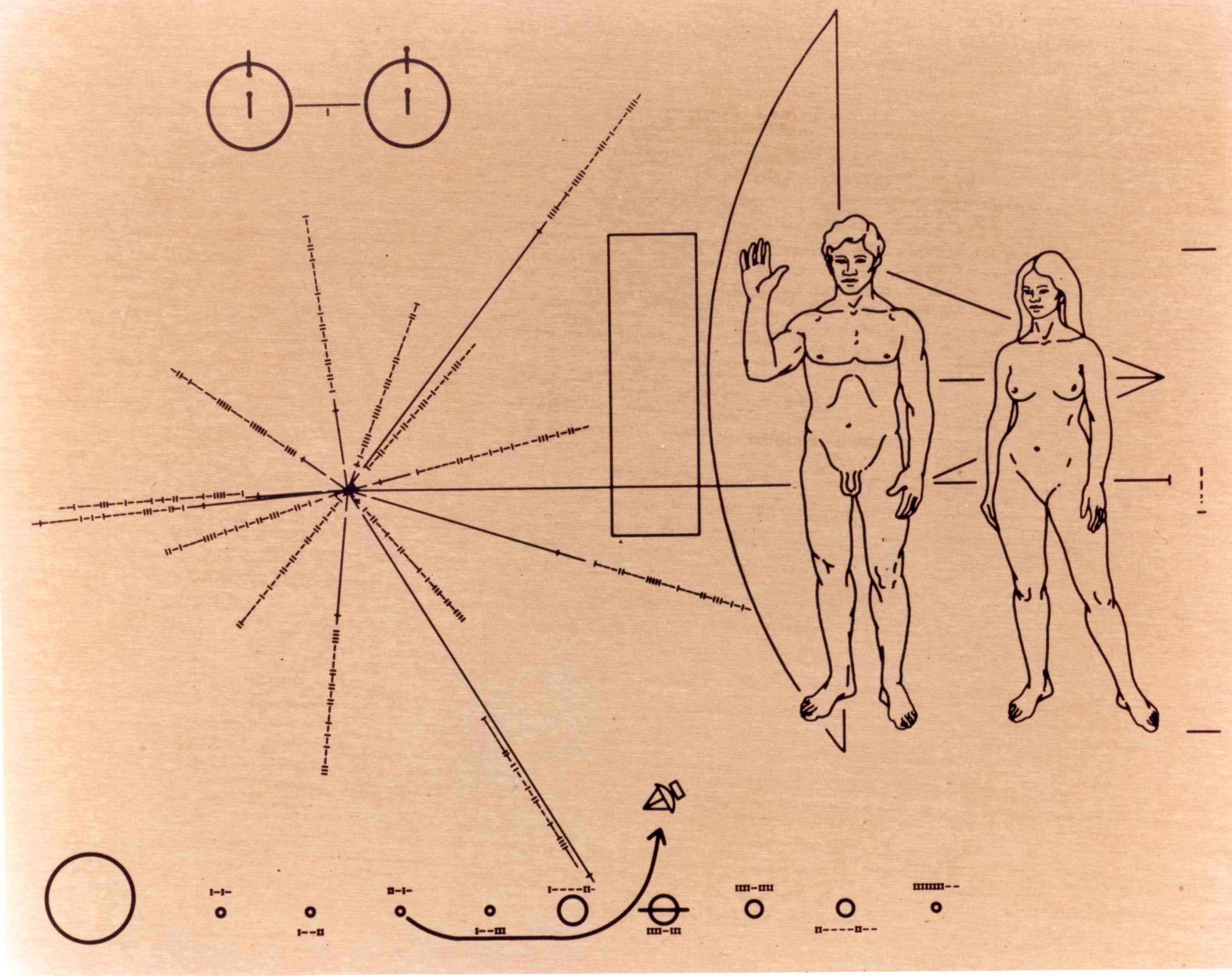
The Pioneer plaque attached to Pioneers 10 and 11

- Pioneer 10 (Pioneer F) – Jupiter, interstellar medium, launched March 1972
- Pioneer 11 (Pioneer G) – Jupiter, Saturn, interstellar medium, launched April 1973
- Pioneer H – proposed out-of-ecliptic mission for 1974, never launched. Would have used flight spare for Pioneers 10 and 11.

=== Venus project ===
- Pioneer Venus Orbiter (Pioneer Venus 1, Pioneer 12) – launched May 1978
- Pioneer Venus Multiprobe (Pioneer Venus 2, Pioneer 13) – launched August 1978
  - Pioneer Venus Probe Bus – transport vehicle and upper atmosphere probe
  - Pioneer Venus Large Probe – 300 kg parachuted probe
  - Pioneer Venus North Probe – 75 kg impactor probe
  - Pioneer Venus Night Probe – 75 kg impactor probe
  - Pioneer Venus Day Probe – 75 kg impactor probe

== See also ==
- Mariner program
- Pioneer anomaly
- Ranger program
- Surveyor program
- Timeline of Solar System exploration
- Voyager program
