= Pioneer 5 =

NASA interplanetary mission (1960)

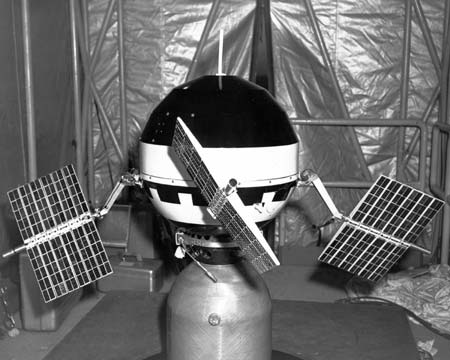
- Pioneer 5 mounted to its Thor-Able launcher.
- Mission type: Interplanetary space research
- Operator: NASA
- Harvard designation: 1960 Alpha 1
- COSPAR ID: 1960-001A
- SATCAT no.: 27
- Mission duration: 3 months, 15 days

Spacecraft properties
- Manufacturer: TRW Inc.
- Launch mass: 43.2 kg (95 lb)

Start of mission
- Launch date: 11 March 1960, 13:00:07 UTC
- Rocket: Thor DM 18-Able IV
- Launch site: Cape Canaveral, LC-17A
- Contractor: Douglas

End of mission
- Last contact: 30 April 1960; Last telemetry 26 June 1960; Last signal received

Orbital parameters
- Reference system: Heliocentric
- Eccentricity: 0.1689
- Perihelion altitude: 0.7061 AU (105.63×10^{6} km; 65.64×10^{6} mi)
- Aphelion altitude: 0.9931 AU (148.57×10^{6} km; 92.31×10^{6} mi)
- Inclination: 3.35°
- Period: 311.6 days

Pioneer 5 (also known as Pioneer P-2, and Able 4, and nicknamed the "Paddle-Wheel Satellite") was a spin-stabilized space probe in the NASA Pioneer program used to investigate interplanetary space between the orbits of Earth and Venus. It was launched on 11 March 1960 from Cape Canaveral Air Force Station Launch Complex 17A at 13:00:00 UTC with an on-orbit dry mass of 43 kg (95 lb). It was a 0.66 m (2.2 ft) diameter sphere with 1.4 metres (4 ft 7 in) span across its four solar panels and achieved a solar orbit of 0.806 × 0.995 AU (120.6 million × 148.8 million km).

Data was received until 30 April 1960. Among other accomplishments, the probe confirmed the existence of interplanetary magnetic fields. Pioneer 5 was the most successful probe in the Pioneer/Able series.

The original mission plan was for a launch in November 1959 where Pioneer 5 would conduct a flyby of Venus, but technical issues prevented the launch from occurring until early 1960 by which time the Venus window for the year had closed. Since it was not possible to send the probe to Venus, it would instead merely investigate interplanetary space and an actual mission to the planet would have to wait another three years.

== Design and instruments ==
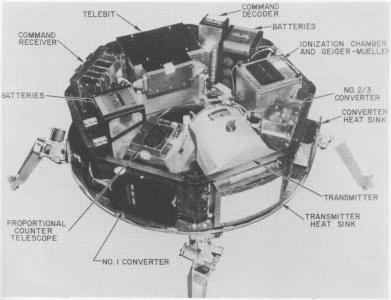
Placement of Pioneer 5 instruments

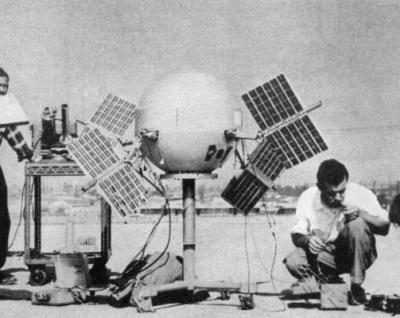
Pioneer 5 with test equipment.

The spacecraft was a 0.66 metres (2 ft 2 in) diameter sphere with four solar panels that spanned over 1.4 metres (4 ft 7 in) and it was equipped with four scientific instruments:

1. A triple coincidence omnidirectional proportional counter telescope to detect solar particles and observe terrestrial trapped radiation. It could detect photons with E > 75 MeV and electrons with E > 13 MeV.
2. A rotating search coil magnetometer to measure the magnetic field in the distant field of the Earth, near the geomagnetic boundary, and in interplanetary space. It was capable of measuring fields from 1 microgauss to 12 milligauss. It consisted of a single search coil that was mounted on the spacecraft in such a way that it measured the magnetic field perpendicular to the spin axis of the spacecraft. It could output its measurements in both an analog and a digital format.
3. A Neher-type integrating ionization chamber and an Anton 302 Geiger-Müller tube (which functioned as a cosmic ray detector) to measure cosmic radiation. It was mounted normal to the spin axis of the spacecraft.
4. A micrometeorite momentum spectrometer (or micrometeorite detector) that consisted of two diaphragm and microphone combinations. It was used to measure the amount of meteoritic dust particles and the momentum of these particles.

== Mission ==
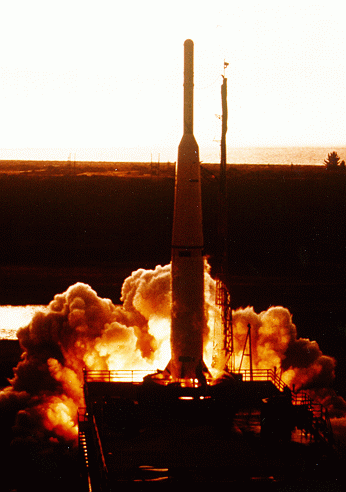
Launch of Thor-Able IV with Pioneer 5

Booster performance during launch was overall excellent considering the numerous earlier difficulties with the Thor-Able vehicle. There were some minor anomalies with the second stage flight control system that resulted in unplanned pitch and roll motions, however, they were not enough to endanger the mission.

The spacecraft returned data collected by the magnetometer on the magnetic field and it measured that the median undisturbed interplanetary field was approximately 5 γ ± 0.5 γ in magnitude. The spacecraft also measured solar flare particles, and cosmic radiation in the interplanetary region. The micrometeorite counter failed to operate as the data system saturated and failed to operate properly.

The recorded digital data were transmitted at 1, 8, and 64 bit/s, depending on the distance of the spacecraft from Earth and the size of the receiving antenna. Weight limitations on the solar cells prevented continuous operation of the telemetry transmitters. About four operations of 25 min duration were scheduled per day with occasional increases during times of special interest. A total of 138.9 h of operation was completed, and over three megabits of data were received. The major portion of the data was received by the Lovell radio telescope at Jodrell Bank Observatory and the Hawaii Tracking Station because their antennas provided grid reception. Data was received until 30 April 1960, after which telemetry noise and weak signal strength made data reception impossible. The spacecraft's signal was detected by Jodrell Bank from a record distance of 36.2 million km (22.5 million mi) on 26 June 1960, although it was much too weak by then to acquire data.

== Communications ==
In common with Explorer 6, Pioneer 5 used the earliest known digital telemetry system used on spacecraft, codenamed "Telebit", which was a tenfold (or 10 dB) improvement in channel efficiency on previous generation "Microlog" analog systems in use since Explorer 1 and the biggest single improvement in signal encoding on western spacecraft. The spacecraft received the uplink carrier at 401.8 MHz and converted it to a 378.2 MHz signal using a 16/17 coherent oscillator circuit. The telemetry system phase modulated a 512 Hz subcarrier, which was in turn amplitude modulated at 64, 8, or 1bit/s. The spacecraft was unable to aim its antennas, and so had no high-gain dish antenna common on later spacecraft. Instead, the system could introduce a 150W amplifier into its normally 5W transmitter circuit. It was powered by a battery of 28 F-size NiCd cells recharged by the solar paddles, allowing up to eight minutes of high power communications before risking damage to the batteries. Each hour of 5W communications or five minutes of 150W communications required ten hours of recharging the batteries. Unlike later interplanetary spacecraft (Mariner 2 and beyond), this spacecraft did not use the Deep Space Network, which was not yet available, but a somewhat ad hoc Space Network called SPAN consisting of the 76m Lovell Telescope (then called Manchester Mark I), a 26-meter radio telescope in Hawaii, and a small helical array in Singapore.

== See also ==
- Pioneer program
- Timeline of artificial satellites and space probes
- Mariner 2 (also measured interplanetary magnetic field like Pioneer 5)
