= Atlas-Able =

American expendable launch system

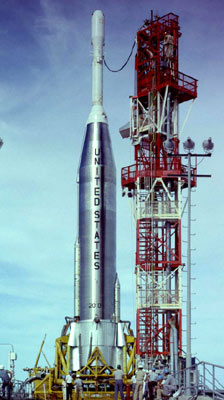
- The Atlas-D Able rocket carrying Pioneer P-3, sitting on Cape Canaveral's Launch Complex 14.
- Manufacturer: Convair Division of General Dynamics
- Country of origin: United States

Size
- Height: 28 m (91 ft)
- Diameter: 3.05 m (10 ft)
- Stages: 3.5

Booster stage – Half Stage
- Powered by: 2
- Maximum thrust: 300,000 lbf (1,300 kN); Atlas D
- Propellant: RP-1/LOX

First stage – Sustainer
- Powered by: 1
- Maximum thrust: 60,000 lbf (270 kN); Atlas D
- Propellant: RP-1/LOX

Second stage – Able
- Powered by: 1 AJ10-37
- Maximum thrust: 7,800 lbf (35 kN)
- Specific impulse: 270
- Burn time: 115
- Propellant: Nitric Acid / UDMH

Third stage – Altair
- Powered by: 1
- Propellant: solid

Capacity

Payload to Trans-lunar injection
- Mass: 168 kg (370 lb)

Launch history
- Status: Retired
- Launch sites: LC-12, 13 & 14, Cape Canaveral
- Total launches: 3
- Failure: 3
- First flight: 26 November 1959
- Last flight: 15 December 1960

The Atlas-Able was an American expendable launch system derived from the SM-65 Atlas missile. It was a member of the Atlas family of rockets, and was used to launch several Pioneer spacecraft towards the Moon. Of the five Atlas-Able rockets built, two failed during static firings, and the other three failed to reach orbit.

The Atlas-Able was a three-and-a-half-stage rocket, with a stage-and-a-half Atlas missile as the first stage, an Able second stage, and an Altair third stage.

The first Atlas-Able used an Atlas C as the first stage, and was intended to carry Pioneer P-1, but exploded during a static fire test on 24 September 1959.

The remaining Pioneer launches used Atlas D missiles. Launches were conducted from Launch Complexes 12 and 14 at the Cape Canaveral Air Force Station. One launch was planned from Launch Complex 13; this became the second Atlas-Able to be destroyed during a static firing, and hence never launched.

== Launches ==
Launches of Atlas-Able
Date	Serial No.	Mission	Launch site	Outcome	Photo
-	Atlas 9C	Pioneer P-1	LC-12	Failure. Explosion during a static fire test.	
26 November 1959	Atlas 20D	Pioneer P-3	LC-14	Failure. The payload fairing broke up at 45 seconds after liftoff, causing loss of the upper stage and payload.	
25 September 1960	Atlas 80D	Pioneer P-30	LC-12	Failure. A propellant feed on the second stage had a malfunction.	
15 December 1960	Atlas 91D	Pioneer P-31	LC-12	Failure. Vibration and/or debris from the Able adapter section ruptured the liquid oxygen tank of Atlas, causing an explosion.	
