= Pioneer P-31 =

1960 US lunar probe attempt

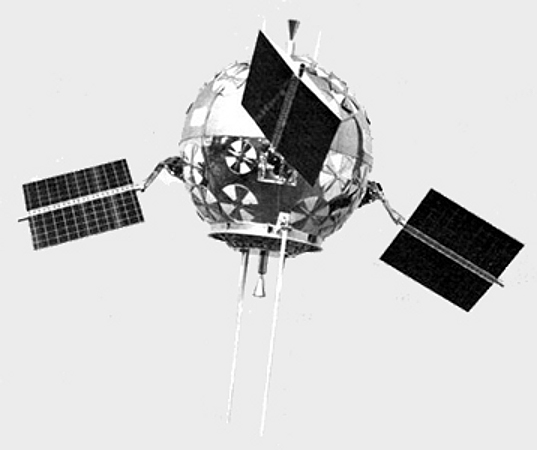
- Pioneer P-31 lunar probe
- Mission type: Lunar orbiter
- Operator: NASA
- Mission duration: Launch failure

Spacecraft properties
- Manufacturer: TRW
- Launch mass: 175.0 kilograms (385.8 lb)

Start of mission
- Launch date: 15 December 1960, 09:10 UTC
- Rocket: Atlas D Able
- Launch site: Cape Canaveral LC-12

Pioneer P-31 (also known as Atlas-Able 5B or Pioneer Z) was intended to be a lunar orbiter probe, but the mission failed shortly after launch. The objectives were to place a highly instrumented probe in lunar orbit, to investigate the environment between the Earth and Moon, and to develop technology for controlling and maneuvering spacecraft from Earth. It was equipped to take images of the lunar surface with a television-like system, estimate the Moon's mass and topography of the poles, record the distribution and velocity of micrometeorites, and study radiation, magnetic fields, and low frequency electromagnetic waves in space. A midcourse propulsion system and injection rocket would have been the first United States self-contained propulsion system capable of operation many months after launch at great distances from Earth and the first U.S. tests of maneuvering a satellite in space.

== Mission ==
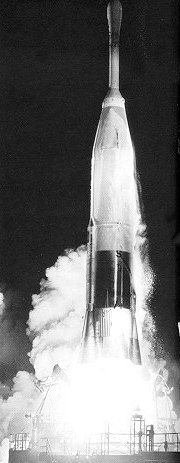
Atlas-Able booster rocket launching Pioneer P-31 on December 15, 1960

The spacecraft was launched on Atlas vehicle 91D coupled to Thor-Able upper stages including an Able solid propellant third stage on 15 December 1960. The launch was uneventful until T+66 seconds when a severe axial disturbance was recorded, followed by rapid loss of LOX tank pressure. The Atlas's engines continued operating for five more seconds. The booster pitched down and final structural breakup and loss of telemetry occurred at T+74 seconds. The payload fell into the Atlantic Ocean 12 to 20 km (7.5 to 12.4 mi) from Cape Canaveral in about 20 meters (66 feet) deep water. A Navy salvage operation recovered parts of the launch vehicle and the payload. The immediate cause of the failure was unclear, but thought to be related to either the adapter mating the Able stages to the Atlas coming loose and being rammed into the LOX tank or else aerodynamic buffeting on the launch vehicle. The recovered Able second stage showed no sign that engine ignition or operation had taken place, and the most probable cause of the failure was believed to be aerodynamic flexing of the Able adapter which then ruptured the Atlas's LOX tank and caused the upper stages to break off the stack. The crippled booster continued to fly for a few seconds afterward, but the structural collapse of the Atlas's forward section combined with the loss of LOX pressure to the propellant feed system resulted in engine shutdown and vehicle self-destruction.

As a result of this failure and Mercury-Atlas 1 five months earlier due to a similar episode of aerodynamic bending in the forward portion of the LOX tank, GD/A began requiring that all Atlas upper stage/payload combinations undergo proper structural dynamics testing.

The failure was described as "especially disappointing" since it was the final launch in the Able probe series as its successor, the Ranger program, was in the works. In the end, the US space program would not see a completely successful lunar probe until Ranger 7 four years later. It also marked the final launch in the first generation of lunar probes, which used direct ascent trajectories and would give way to the second generation probes which had parking orbits.

== Spacecraft design ==
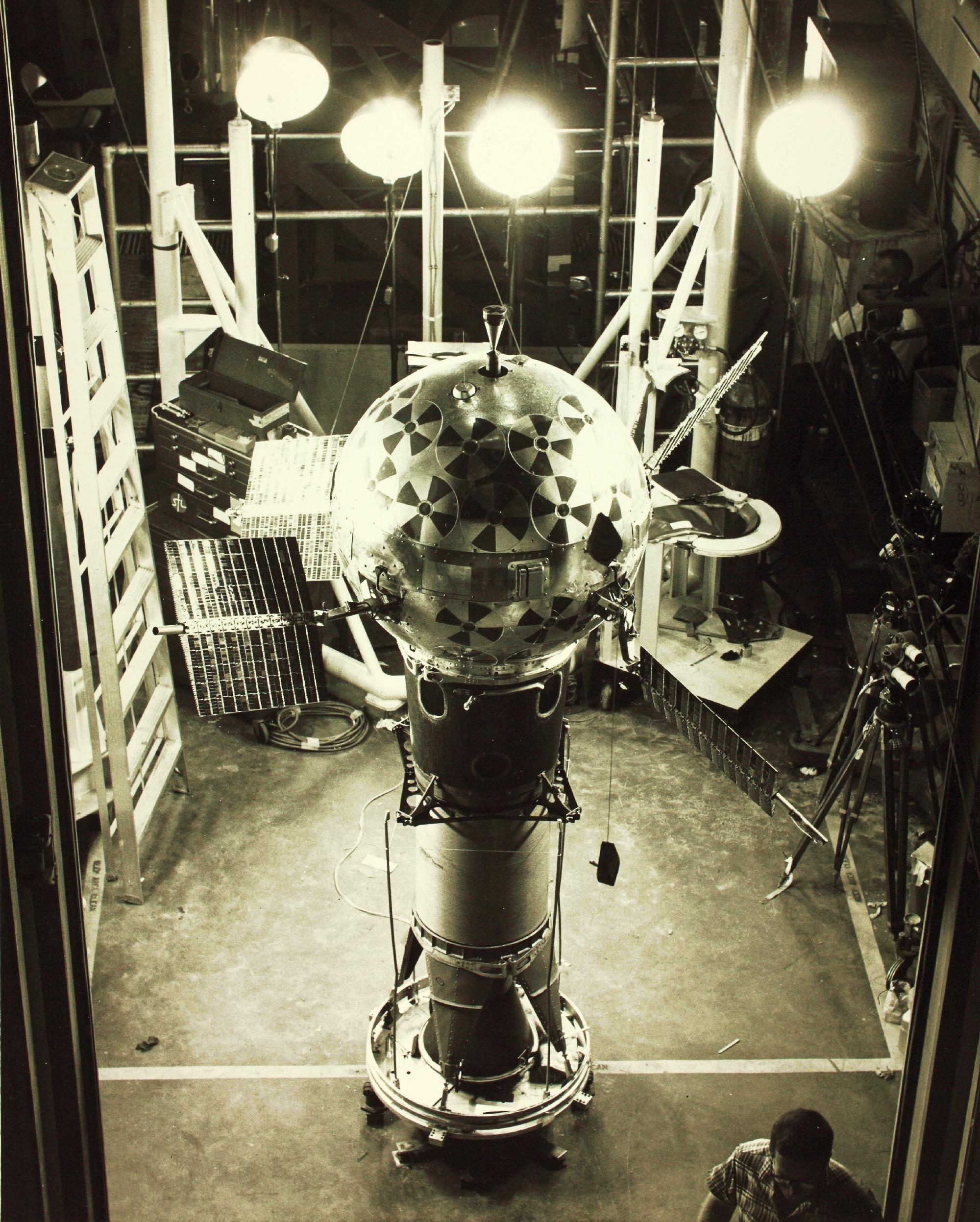
Payload fit check for Atlas Able moon probe

Pioneer P-31 was virtually identical to the earlier Pioneer P-30 satellite which failed, a 1-meter diameter sphere with a propulsion system mounted on the bottom giving a total length of 1.4 meters. The mass of the structure and aluminum alloy shell was about 30 kg and the propulsion units roughly 90 kg. Four solar panels, each 60 x 60 cm and containing 2200 solar cells in 22 100-cell nodules, extended from the sides of the spherical shell in a "paddle-wheel" configuration with a total span of about 2.7 meters. The solar panels charged nickel-cadmium batteries. Inside the shell, a large spherical hydrazine tank made up most of the volume, topped by two smaller spherical nitrogen tanks and a 90 N injection rocket to slow the spacecraft down to go into lunar orbit, which was designed to be capable of firing twice during the mission. Attached to the bottom of the sphere was a 90 N vernier rocket for mid-course propulsion and lunar orbit maneuvers which could be fired four times.

Around the upper hemisphere of the hydrazine tank was a ring-shaped instrument platform which held the batteries in two packs, two 1.5 W UHF transmitters and diplexers, logic modules for scientific instruments, two command receivers, decoders, a buffer/amplifier, three converters, a telebit, a command box, and most of the scientific instruments. Two dipole UHF antennas protruded from the top of the sphere on either side of the injection rocket nozzle. Two dipole UHF antennas and a long VLF antenna protruded from the bottom of the sphere. The transmitters operated on a frequency of 378 MHz.

Thermal control was planned to be achieved by 50 small "propeller blade" devices on the surface of the sphere. The blades themselves were made of reflective material and consisted of four vanes which were flush against the surface, covering a black heat-absorbing pattern painted on the sphere. A thermally sensitive coil was attached to the blades in such a way that low temperatures within the satellite would cause the coil to contract and rotate the blades and expose the heat absorbing surface, and high temperatures would cause the blades to cover the black patterns. Square heat-sink units were also mounted on the surface of the sphere to help dissipate heat from the interior.

== On-board equipment ==
The scientific instruments consisted of an ion chamber and Geiger-Müller tube to measure total radiation flux, a proportional radiation counter telescope to measure high energy radiation, a scintillation counter to monitor low-energy radiation, a scintillation spectrometer to study the Earth's (and possible lunar) radiation belts, a VLF receiver for natural radio waves, a transponder to study electron density, and part of the flux-gate and search coil magnetometers mounted on the instrument platform. A plasma probe was mounted on the sphere to measure energy and momentum distribution of protons above a few kilovolts to study the radiation effect of solar flares. The micrometeorite detector and sun scanner were mounted on the sphere as well. The only difference between Pioneer P-31 and the earlier Pioneer P-30 was the addition of a solid state detector sensitive to low energy protons on the satellite and an STL-designed rubidium frequency standard experiment placed on a pod attached to the booster. The total mass of the science package including electronics and power supply was roughly 60 kg. Total cost of the mission was estimated at 9–10 million dollars.
