= Pioneer H =

Unlaunched uncrewed space mission

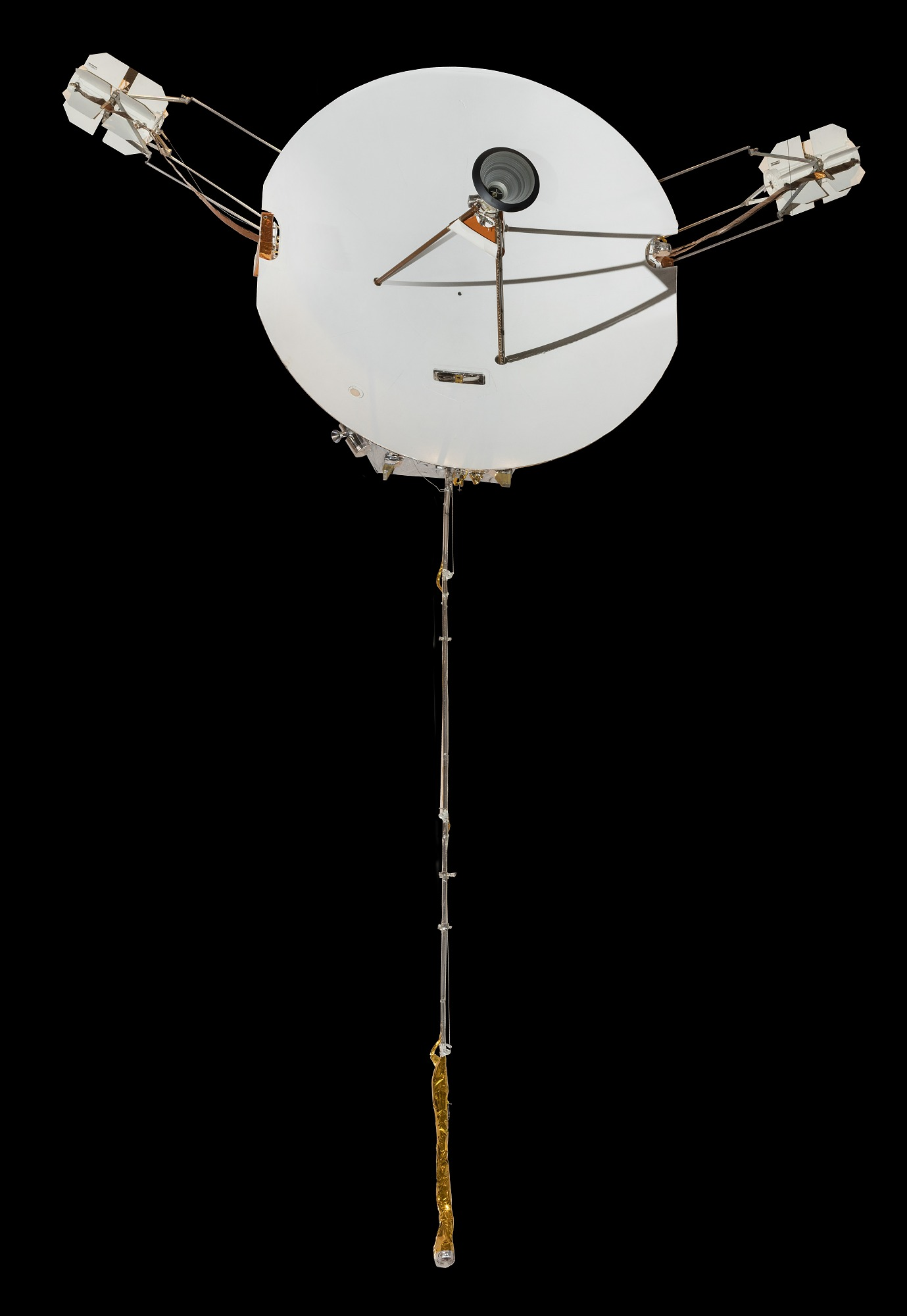
Reconstructed full-scale mock-up Pioneer 10 / 11 spacecraft at the National Air and Space Museum

Pioneer H was a proposed space probe for the US Pioneer program. If it had been approved, it would have been launched in 1974 and have been designated Pioneer 12; that designation was later applied to the Pioneer Venus Orbiter.

== History ==
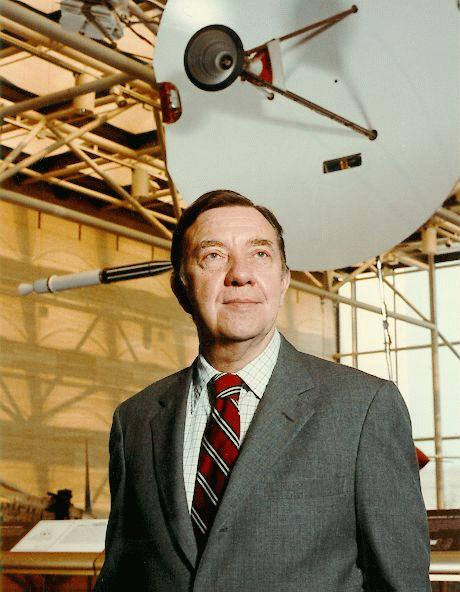
The Pioneer flight spare at NASM, behind James A. Van Allen

As planning for the Pioneer 10 and 11 missions progressed, mission scientists found themselves desiring a third probe. In 1971, a formal mission study was proposed for a spacecraft to be launched to Jupiter in 1974, where it would use the gas giant as a gravitational slingshot to travel outside the ecliptic. This was the first Out-Of-The-Ecliptic mission (OOE) proposed, for Jupiter and solar (Sun) observations.

NASA/Ames Research Center would have managed the project. The NASA contractor TRW Systems Group (formerly Space Technology Laboratories) would have constructed the Pioneer H probe from the flight-qualified spare components intended for the Pioneer F and G probes (designated Pioneer 10 and Pioneer 11 after launch), along with a small amount of new build hardware.

TRW assembled the spare components into a new spacecraft, but NASA management did not approve the mission proposal, and it was never launched. In 1976 NASA transferred the probe (without RTG) to the Smithsonian Institution. In January 1977, it was moved to the National Air and Space Museum, where it was eventually displayed as a replica of Pioneer 10.

== Successor missions ==
The Pioneer H mission concept was finally realized with the Ulysses mission, which achieved the OOE orbit originally envisioned for Pioneer H. The Juno mission, currently at Jupiter in a polar orbit, is taking the magnetometer observations of Jupiter's poles that Pioneer H would have performed.

== Current location ==
The Pioneer flight spare hangs in the Milestones of Flight Gallery at the National Air and Space Museum in Washington, D.C., serving as a stand-in for the Pioneer 10 probe.

While described in official Smithsonian records as a "replica", the spacecraft was considered fully functional by Pioneer mission planners (though its radioisotope thermoelectric generator was never installed). Mark Wolverton quotes James Van Allen in The Depths of Space:

We mounted an intensive campaign to launch the flight-worthy spare spacecraft and its instrument complement on a low-cost, out-of-ecliptic mission via a high-inclination flyby of Jupiter. However, our case fell on deaf ears at NASA headquarters, and the spare spacecraft now hangs in the main gallery of the National Air and Space Museum, at 1 AU and zero ecliptic latitude.
