= Pioneer P-1 =

1959 US attempted satellite

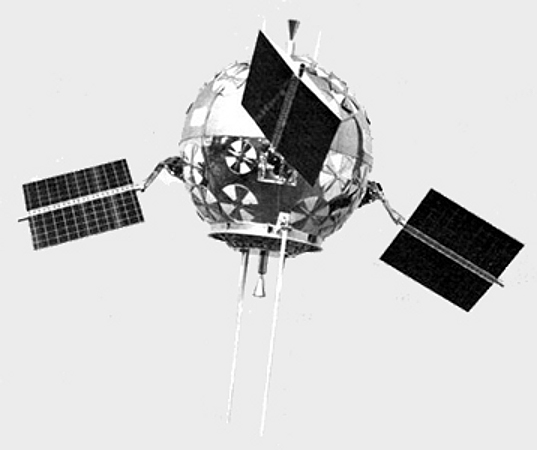
- The Pioneer P-1 lunar probe
- Mission type: Lunar orbiter
- Operator: NASA
- Mission duration: Failed to launch

Spacecraft properties
- Manufacturer: TRW Space Technology Laboratories
- Launch mass: 168 kg (370 lb)

Start of mission
- Launch date: October 1959 (24 September 1959 pre-launch failure)
- Rocket: Atlas C-Able #9C
- Launch site: Cape Canaveral, LC-12

Pioneer P-1 was a failed mission in the Pioneer program. The spacecraft was a 1-meter diameter sphere with a propulsion module, and was to carry a TV camera and magnetic field sensor. It was to be spin-stabilized and was known as a 'paddlewheel' spacecraft.

The spacecraft was intended for launch on an Atlas C-Able rocket, but this vehicle was destroyed on 24 September 1959 in an explosion on its launch pad during a pre-launch static firing. The P-1 spacecraft and an Able IV space engine were not present on the launch vehicle when it exploded, and were later used on the Pioneer P-3 mission.

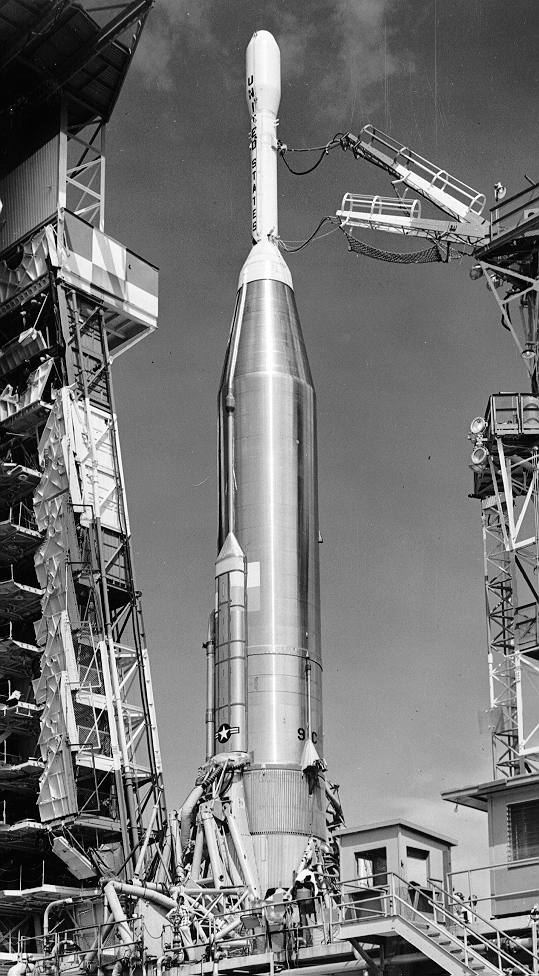
The only specimen of the Atlas C-Able rocket, intended to carry Pioneer P-1, prior to an explosion during static firing.
