= Space probe =

Unmanned robotic spacecraft

A space probe is an uncrewed robotic spacecraft designed to explore outer space and transmit scientific data back to Earth. Space probes are used to investigate the Moon, planets, moons, asteroids, comets, the Sun, and interstellar space – it then becomes an interstellar probe. Unlike artificial satellites, which usually remain in orbit around Earth, probes are sent beyond Earth orbit toward other celestial bodies or into deep space.

== History ==
The first space probes were developed during the early years of the Space Age in the late 1950s. Among the earliest missions were the Soviet Luna probes and the American Pioneer program. Early probes were intended to study the Moon, while later missions expanded to Venus, Mars, Jupiter, Saturn, and other bodies in the Solar System.

Space probes can be divided into several types according to their mission profile. A flyby probe passes near a celestial body without entering orbit. An orbiter enters orbit around a target body for long-term observation. A lander reaches the surface of a planet or moon, while a rover is capable of moving across the surface. Atmospheric probes descend through an atmosphere to study its composition and weather conditions.

Many space probes have made important scientific discoveries. The Mariner 2 probe became the first spacecraft to successfully fly by another planet when it passed Venus in 1962. The Voyager probes explored the outer planets and later entered interstellar space. The Cassini–Huygens mission studied Saturn and its moons, while the Huygens lander became the first probe to land on Titan in 2005.

Modern space probes continue to explore increasingly distant regions of the Solar System. Voyager 1 became the first human-made object to enter interstellar space in 2012. More recent missions such as Parker Solar Probe and Lucy have been designed to study the Sun and primitive asteroids in unprecedented detail.

== See also ==
- List of Solar System probes
- Uncrewed spacecraft
