= Pioneer P-30 =

Nasa 1960s lunar orbiter probe

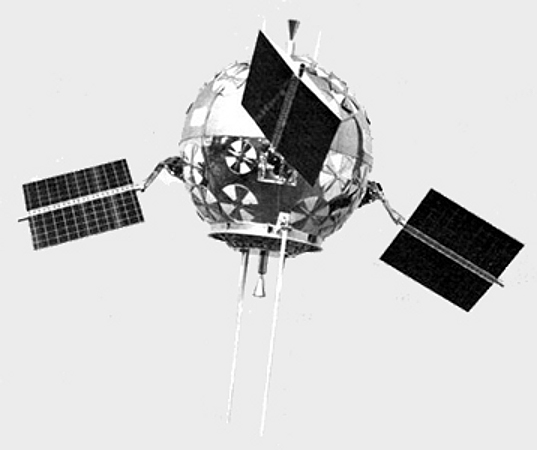
- Pioneer P-30 lunar probe
- Mission type: Lunar orbiter
- Operator: NASA
- Mission duration: Failure to launch

Spacecraft properties
- Manufacturer: TRW Space Technology Laboratories
- Launch mass: 175.5 kg (387 lb)

Start of mission
- Launch date: 25 September 1960, 15:13:00 UTC
- Rocket: Atlas D-Able
- Launch site: Cape Canaveral, LC-12

Orbital parameters
- Apogee altitude: 1,290 kilometres (800 mi)

Pioneer P-30 (also known as Able 5A, Atlas-Able 5A, or Pioneer Y) was intended to be a lunar orbiter probe, but the mission failed shortly after launch on September 25, 1960. The objectives were to place a highly instrumented probe in lunar orbit, to investigate the environment between the Earth and Moon, and to develop technology for controlling and maneuvering spacecraft from Earth. It was equipped to estimate the Moon's mass and topography of the poles, record the distribution and velocity of micrometeorites, and study radiation, magnetic fields, and low frequency electromagnetic waves in space. A mid-course propulsion system and injection rocket would have been the first United States self-contained propulsion system capable of operation many months after launch at great distances from Earth and the first U.S. tests of maneuvering a satellite in space.

== Mission ==
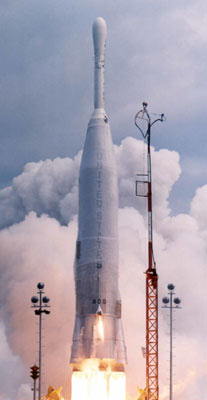
Launch of Atlas-Able 5A carrying Pioneer P-30

Nearly a year passed between the first Atlas-Able launch in November 1959 and this second attempt due to a shortage of Atlas boosters as well as intense competition between NASA and the U.S. Air Force for use of the pads at Cape Canaveral. The spacecraft was launched on Atlas 80D coupled to Thor-Able upper stages including a Hercules ABL solid-propellant third stage, one year and a day after the Atlas-Able pad explosion on LC-12. While P-3 had used a recycled booster from the Mercury program, which had a number of custom modifications, P-30's launch vehicle (Atlas 80D) was a standard-configuration Atlas D ICBM with the exception of thicker skin to support the additional weight of the upper stages. Atlas BECO was performed at T+250 seconds and SECO at T+275 seconds. Vernier solo mode was not planned for this launch due to the direct ascent trajectory and VECO was to take place at T+280 seconds, however, a malfunction of a timer relay prevented this from happening and the verniers continued operating until propellant depletion. There were also minor problems with the Atlas pneumatic and flight control systems, however, none of them negatively affected overall booster performance. At an altitude of about 370 km (230 mi), the first stage separated from the second stage. The Able second stage ignited and started up properly, however, thrust quickly decayed and then dropped to zero. The vehicle was unable to achieve Earth orbit, re-entered, and was believed to have come down somewhere in the Indian Ocean. Signals were returned by the payload for 17 minutes after launch. The mission was designed to reach the Moon approximately 62 hours after launch. The second stage malfunction was attributed to a loss of pressure in the propellant feed system, starving the engine of oxidizer. Although the mission was a failure, ground controllers fired Able VA's onboard liquid propellant hydrazine rocket engine — the first time that an onboard motor was fired on a space vehicle.

== Spacecraft design ==
Pioneer P-30 was almost identical to the earlier Pioneer P-3 satellite which failed, a 1-meter diameter sphere with a propulsion system mounted on the bottom giving a total length of 1.4 meters (55 in). The mass of the structure and aluminum alloy shell was about 30 kg (66 lb) and the propulsion units roughly 90 kg (200 lb). Four solar panels, each 60 cm × 60 cm (24 in × 24 in) and containing 2200 solar cells in 22 100-cell nodules, extended from the sides of the spherical shell in a "paddle-wheel" configuration with a total span of about 2.7 meters (110 in). The solar panels charged nickel-cadmium batteries. Inside the shell, a large spherical hydrazine tank made up most of the volume, topped by two smaller spherical nitrogen tanks and a 90 N injection rocket to slow the spacecraft down to go into lunar orbit, which was designed to be capable of firing twice during the mission. Attached to the bottom of the sphere was a 90 N vernier rocket for mid-course propulsion and lunar orbit maneuvers which could be fired four times.

Around the upper hemisphere of the hydrazine tank was a ring-shaped instrument platform which held the batteries in two packs, two 1.5 W UHF transmitters and diplexers, logic modules for scientific instruments, two command receivers, decoders, a buffer/amplifier, three converters, a telebit, a command box, and most of the scientific instruments. Two dipole UHF antennas protruded from the top of the sphere on either side of the injection rocket nozzle. Two dipole UHF antennas and a long VLF antenna protruded from the bottom of the sphere. The transmitters operated on a frequency of 378 megahertz.

Thermal control was planned to be achieved by fifty small "propeller blade" devices on the surface of the sphere. The blades themselves were made of reflective material and consist of four vanes which were flush against the surface, covering a black heat-absorbing pattern painted on the sphere. A thermally sensitive coil was attached to the blades in such a way that low temperatures within the satellite would cause the coil to contract and rotate the blades and expose the heat-absorbing surface, and high temperatures would cause the blades to cover the black patterns. Square heat-sink units were also mounted on the surface of the sphere to help dissipate heat from the interior.

== On-board equipment ==
The scientific instruments consisted of an ion chamber and Geiger-Müller tube to measure total radiation flux, a proportional radiation counter telescope to measure high energy radiation, a scintillation counter to monitor low-energy radiation, a VLF receiver for natural radio waves, a transponder to study electron density, and part of the flux-gate and search coil magnetometers mounted on the instrument platform. The micrometeorite detector and sun scanner were mounted on the sphere. The difference between the payload of Pioneer P-30 and the earlier Pioneer P-3 was the replacement of the TV facsimile system on P-3 with a scintillation spectrometer to study the Earth's (and possible lunar) radiation belts, mounted on the instrument platform, and a plasma probe mounted on the sphere to measure energy and momentum distribution of protons above a few kilovolts to study the radiation effect of solar flares. The total mass of the science package including electronics and power supply was roughly 60 kg (130 lb). The total cost of the mission was estimated at 9–10 million dollars.
