= List of Thor and Delta launches (1970–1979) =

Between 1970 and 1979, there were 117 Thor missiles launched, of which 108 were successful, giving a 92.3% success rate.

NASA used it to launch its own satellites, as well as to launch satellites for foreign governments and companies.

== Launch statistics ==
=== Rocket configurations ===
- Thor SVL
- Thor DSV
- Thor Burner
- Delta E
- Delta L
- Delta M
- Delta N
- Delta I (0100)
- Delta I (1000)
- Delta I (2000)
- Delta I (3000)
- N-I

=== Launch sites ===
- Cape Canaveral SLC-17A
- Cape Canaveral SLC-17B
- Vandenberg SLC-1W
- Vandenberg SLC-2W
- Vandenberg SLC-2E
- Vandenberg SLC-3W
- Vandenberg SLC-10W
- Tanegashima SLC-N
- Johnston LE-1
- Johnston LE-2

=== Launch outcomes ===
- Success
- Partial Failure
- Failure

== 1970 ==
There were 19 Thor missiles launched in 1970. 18 of the 19 launches were successful, giving a 94.7% success rate.

Date/Time (UTC)	Rocket	S/N	Launch site	Payload	Function	Orbit	Outcome	Remarks
1970-01-15; 00:16	Delta M	Delta 75; Thor 557	CCAFS SLC-17A	Intelsat 3-6	Communication satellite	GTO	Success	
1970-01-23; 11:52	Delta N6	Delta 76; Thor 542	VAFB SLC-2W	TIROS-M / Oscar 5	Weather Satellite / Amateur radio satellite	LEO / SSO	Success	
1970-02-04; 02:59	Thorad SLV-2G Agena-D	Thor 534; Agena Unknown	VAFB SLC-2E	SERT 2	Technological demonstration satellite	MEO	Success	
1970-02-11; 08:40	Thor Burner 2	Thor 287	VAFB SLC-10W	DMSP-5A-F1	Military weather satellite	LEO / SSO	Success	
1970-03-04; 22:15	Thorad SLV-2H Agena-D	Thor 551; Agena 1657	VAFB SLC-3W	KH-4B (S/N 1109)	Reconnaissance	LEO	Success	
1970-03-20; 23:46	Delta M	Delta 77; Thor 558	CCAFS SLC-17A	NATO 1	Military communication satellite	GTO	Success	
1970-03-27; 07:37	Thor DSV-2J	Thor 152	Johnston LE-1		ASAT test	Suborbital	Success	
1970-04-08; 08:17	Thorad SLV-2G Agena-D	Thor 553; Agena 6223	VAFB SLC-2E	Nimbus 4 / TOPO-1	Weather satellite / Geodesic research satellite	LEO / SSO	Success	
1970-04-23; 00:46	Delta M	Delta 78; Thor 559	CCAFS SLC-17A	Intelsat 3-7	Communication satellite	GTO	Success	
1970-04-24	Thor DSV-2J	Thor 225	Johnston LE-1		Satellite Inspection test	Suborbital	Failure	Thor rocket collided with the satellite.
1970-05-20; 21:35	Thorad SLV-2H Agena-D	Thor 555; Agena 1657	VAFB SLC-3W	KH-4B (S/N 1110)	Reconnaissance	LEO	Success	
1970-07-23; 01:25	Thorad SLV-2H Agena-D	Thor 556; Agena 1654	VAFB SLC-3W	KH-4B (S/N 1111)	Reconnaissance	LEO	Success	
1970-07-23; 23:23	Delta M	Delta 79; Thor 563	CCAFS SLC-17A	Intelsat 3-8	Communication satellite	GTO	Success	
1970-08-19; 12:11	Delta M	Delta 80; Thor 561	CCAFS SLC-17A	Skynet-1B	Military communication satellite	GTO	Success	
1970-08-26; 10:01	Thorad SLV-2G Agena-D	Thor 535; Agena 2736	VAFB SLC-1W	Ferret 15 (OPS 8329)	ELINT	LEO	Success	
1970-09-03; 08:39	Thor Burner 2	Thor 288	VAFB SLC-10W	DMSP-5A-F2	Military weather satellite	LEO / SSO	Success	
1970-09-24; 12:54	Thor DSV-2J	Thor 271	Johnston LE-2		Astronomy research flight	Suborbital	Success	
1970-11-18; 21:29	Thorad SLV-2H Agena-D	Thor 552; Agena 1658	VAFB SLC-3W	KH-4B (S/N 1112)	Reconnaissance	LEO	Success	
1970-12-11; 11:35	Delta N6	Delta 81; Thor 546	VAFB SLC-2W	NOAA-1	Weather Satellite	LEO / SSO	Success	

== 1971 ==
There were 14 Thor missiles launched in 1971. 12 of the 14 launches were successful, giving an 85.7% success rate.

Date/Time (UTC)	Rocket	S/N	Launch site	Payload	Function	Orbit	Outcome	Remarks
1971-02-03; 01:41	Delta M	Delta 82; Thor 560	CCAFS SLC-17A	NATO 2	Military communication satellite	GTO	Success	
1971-02-17; 03:52	Thor Burner 2	Thor 249	VAFB SLC-10W	DMSP-5A-F3 / Calsphere 3A / Calsphere 4 / Calsphere 5	Military weather satellite / Technology demonstration (x3)	LEO / SSO	Success	
1971-02-17; 20:04	Thorad SLV-2H Agena-D	Thor 537; Agena 1659	VAFB SLC-3W	KH-4B (S/N 1113)	Reconnaissance	LEO	Failure	Improper pre-flight procedure caused frozen lubricant to form a plug that resulted in complete turbopump failure 18 seconds after liftoff. The booster lost thrust and impacted the ground not far from the launch complex.
1971-03-13; 16:15	Delta M6	Delta 83; Thor 562	CCAFS SLC-17A	Explorer 43 (IMP-H)	Magnetosphere research satellite	HEO	Success	
1971-03-24; 21:05	Thorad SLV-2H Agena-D	Thor 538; Agena 1660	VAFB SLC-3W	KH-4B (S/N 1114)	Reconnaissance	LEO	Success	
1971-04-01; 02:53	Delta E1	Delta 84; Thor 491	VAFB SLC-2E	ISIS-II	Ionosphere research satellite	LEO / SSO	Success	
1971-06-08; 14:00	Thor Burner 2	Thor 210	VAFB SLC-10W	SESP-1 (P70-1)	Technological demonstration satellite	LEO	Success	
1971-07-16; 21:29	Thorad SLV-2H Agena-D	Thor 552; Agena 1658	VAFB SLC-1W	Ferret 16 (OPS 8373)	ELINT	LEO	Success	
1971-09-10; 21:33	Thorad SLV-2H Agena-D	Thor 567; Agena 1662	VAFB SLC-3W	KH-4B (S/N 1115)	Reconnaissance	LEO	Success	
1971-09-29; 09:50	Delta N	Delta 85; Thor 565	CCAFS SLC-17A	OSO 7 / TTS-4	Solar observation satellite / Technology demonstration	LEO, 321×572 km, 93.2 min, i=33.1°, e=0.0184	Success	2nd stage suffered a failure of the attitude control system, however the satellite reached orbit and ground controllers were able to correct its flight path.
1971-10-14; 07:51	Thor Burner 2A	Thor 159	VAFB SLC-10W	DMSP-5B-F1	Military weather satellite	LEO / SSO	Success	
1971-10-17; 13:36	Thorad SLV-2G Agena-D	Thor 570; Agena Unknown	VAFB SLC-1W	ASTEX (P71-2)	Technological demonstration satellite	LEO	Success	
1971-10-21; 11:32	Delta N6	Delta 86; Thor 572	VAFB SLC-2E	ITOS-B	Weather Satellite	planned: LEO / SSO	Failure	2nd stage oxidizer leak starting at T+20 seconds. The attitude control system ran out of propellant trying to correct the stage's flight path and the launch vehicle reentered the atmosphere and broke up above the Arctic Circle.
1971-12-14; 21:13	Thorad SLV-2G Agena-D	Thor 568; Agena Unknown	VAFB SLC-1W	Poppy (OPS 7898) (x4)	ELINT	LEO	Success	Final flight of SLV-2G

== 1972 ==
There were 11 Thor missiles launched in 1972. All 11 launches were successful.

Date/Time (UTC)	Rocket	S/N	Launch site	Payload	Function	Orbit	Outcome	Remarks
1972-01-31; 17:20	Delta L	Delta 87; Thor 564	VAFB SLC-2E	HEOS 2	Magnetosphere research satellite	HEO	Success	
1972-03-12; 00:00	Delta N	Delta 88; Thor 573	VAFB SLC-2E	TD-1A	Astronomical research satellite	LEO / SSO	Success	
1972-03-24; 08:46	Thor Burner 2A	Thor 153	VAFB SLC-10W	DMSP-5B-F2	Military weather satellite	LEO / SSO	Success	
1972-04-19; 21:43	Thorad SLV-2H Agena-D	Thor 569; Agena 1661	VAFB SLC-3W	KH-4B (S/N 1116)	Reconnaissance	LEO	Success	
1972-05-25; 18:41	Thorad SLV-2H Agena-D	Thor 571; Agena 1663	VAFB SLC-3W	KH-4B (S/N 1117)	Reconnaissance	LEO	Success	Final flight of Thorad-Agena; Last Corona spacecraft
1972-07-23; 18:06	Delta 904	Delta 89; Thor 574	VAFB SLC-2W	Landsat 1	Earth Resource Technology Satellite	917 km LEO, near polar, Sun synchronous.	Success	First use of 9 strap-on SRBs. Discovered Landsat Island.
1972-09-23; 13:20	Delta 1604	Delta 90; Thor 579	CCAFS SLC-17B	Explorer 47 (IMP-I)	Magnetospheric research satellite	HEO	Success	First successful flight of Delta-1000 series.
15 October 1972; 17:17	Delta 300	Delta 91; Thor 575	VAFB, SLC-2W	NOAA-2 / AMSAT-OSCAR 6	Weather satellite / Amateur radio satellite	LEO / SSO	Success	
1972-11-09; 03:43	Thor Burner 2A	Thor 294	VAFB SLC-10W	DMSP-5B-F3	Military weather satellite	LEO / SSO	Success	
1972-11-10; 01:14	Delta 1914	Delta 92; Thor 580	CCAFS SLC-17B	Anik-A1	Communication Satellite	GTO	Success	
1972-12-11; 07:56	Delta 900	Delta 93; Thor 577	VAFB SLC-2W	Nimbus 5	Weather Satellite	LEO / SSO	Success	

== 1973 ==
There were 7 Thor missiles launched in 1973. 6 of the 7 launches were successful, giving an 85.7% success rate.

Date/Time (UTC)	Rocket	S/N	Launch site	Payload	Function	Orbit	Outcome	Remarks
1973-04-20; 23:47	Delta 1914	Delta 94; Thor 583	CCAFS SLC-17B	Anik-A2	Communication Satellite	GTO	Success	
1973-06-10; 14:13	Delta 1913	Delta 95; Thor 581	CCAFS SLC-17B	Explorer 49 (RAE-B)	Radio astronomy satellite	Lunar Orbit	Success	
1973-07-16; 17:10	Delta 300	Delta 96; Thor 578	VAFB SLC-2W	ITOS-E	Weather Satellite	planned: LEO / SSO	Failure	Hydraulic pump malfunction led to failure of the 2nd stage attitude control system. The booster and payload reentered the atmosphere and broke up.
1973-08-17; 04:49	Thor Burner 2A	Thor 291	VAFB SLC-10W	DMSP-5B-F4	Military weather satellite	LEO / SSO	Success	
1973-10-26; 02:26	Delta 1604	Delta 97; Thor 582	CCAFS SLC-17B	Explorer 50 (IMP-J)	Magnetospheric research satellite	HEO	Success	
1973-11-06; 14:02	Delta 300	Delta 98; Thor 576	VAFB SLC-2W	NOAA-3	Weather Satellite	LEO / SSO	Success	
1973-12-16; 06:18	Delta 1900	Delta 99; Thor 585	VAFB SLC-2W	Explorer 51 (AE-C)	Atmospheric research satellite	MEO	Success	

== 1974 ==
There were 9 Thor missiles launched in 1974. 8 of the 9 launches were successful, giving an 88.9% success rate.

Date/Time (UTC)	Rocket	S/N	Launch site	Payload	Function	Orbit	Outcome	Remarks
1974-01-19; 01:38	Delta 2313	Delta 100; Thor 587	CCAFS SLC-17B	Skynet-2A	Military communication satellite	planned: GTO	Failure	First flight of the Delta 2000 series. Stage 2 electronics package short circuited (induced by a piece of conductive contaminant shaken loose during launch), leading to loss of control.
1974-03-16; 08:00	Thor Burner 2A	Thor 207	VAFB SLC-10W	DMSP-5B-F5	Military weather satellite	LEO / SSO	Success	
1974-04-13; 21:33	Delta 2914	Delta 101; Thor 588	CCAFS SLC-17B	Westar-1	Communication satellite	GTO	Success	
1974-05-17; 10:31	Delta 2914	Delta 102; Thor 590	CCAFS SLC-17B	SMS-1	Weather satellite	GTO	Success	
1974-08-09; 03:22	Thor Burner 2A	Thor 275	VAFB SLC-10W	DMSP-5C-F1	Military weather satellite	LEO / SSO	Success	
1974-10-10; 22:53	Delta 2914	Delta 103; Thor 589	CCAFS SLC-17B	Westar-2	Communication satellite	GTO	Success	
1974-11-15; 17:11	Delta 2310	Delta 104; Thor 592	VAFB SLC-2W	NOAA-4 / Oscar 7 / Intasat	Weather Satellite / Amateur radio satellite / Ionosphere research	LEO / SSO	Success	
1974-11-23; 00:28	Delta 2313	Delta 105; Thor 591	CCAFS SLC-17B	Skynet-2B	Military communication satellite	GTO	Success	
1974-12-19; 02:39	Delta 2914	Delta 106; Thor 599	CCAFS SLC-17B	Symphonie-1	Communication satellite	GTO	Success	

== 1975 ==
There were 16 Thor missiles launched in 1975. All 16 launches were successful.

Date/Time (UTC)	Rocket	S/N	Launch site	Payload	Function	Orbit	Outcome	Remarks
1975-01-22; 17:56	Delta 2910	Delta 107; Thor 598	VAFB SLC-2W	Landsat 2	Earth Resource Technology Satellite	917 km LEO, near polar, Sun synchronous.	Success	Satellite operated until Feb 25, 1982.
1975-02-06; 22:04	Delta 2914	Delta 108; Thor 593	CCAFS SLC-17B	SMS-2	Weather satellite	GTO	Success	
1975-04-10; 23:50	Delta 1410	Delta 109; Thor 584	VAFB SLC-2W	GEOS-C	Geodetic research satellite	LEO	Success	
1975-05-07; 23:35	Delta 2914	Delta 110; Thor 596	CCAFS SLC-17B	Anik-A3	Communication Satellite	GTO	Success	
1975-05-24; 03:22	Thor Burner 2A	Thor 197	VAFB SLC-10W	DMSP-5C-F2	Military weather satellite	LEO / SSO	Success	
1975-06-12; 08:12	Delta 2910	Delta 111; Thor 595	VAFB SLC-2W	Nimbus 6	Weather Satellite	LEO / SSO	Success	
1975-06-21; 11:43	Delta 1910	Delta 112; Thor 586	CCAFS SLC-17B	OSO 8	Solar observation satellite	LEO	Success	
1975-08-09; 01:47	Delta 2913	Delta 113; Thor 602	VAFB SLC-2W	COS-B	High-energy astronomy research satellite	HEO	Success	
1975-09-09; 05:30	N-I	N-1 (F)	Tanegashima SLC-N	KIKU-1	Technological demonstration satellite	MEO	Success	First Japanese licensed built Delta flight.
1975-08-27; 01:42	Delta 2914	Delta 114; Thor 594	CCAFS SLC-17A	Symphonie-2	Communication satellite	GTO	Success	
1975-09-19	Thor DSV-2J	Thor 201	Johnston LE-2		Missile defense test tracking target	Suborbital	Success	
1975-10-06; 09:01	Delta 2910	Delta 115; Thor 600	VAFB SLC-2W	Explorer 54 (AE-D)	Atmospheric research satellite	MEO	Success	
1975-10-16; 22:40	Delta 2914	Delta 116; Thor 597	CCAFS SLC-17B	GOES-A (GOES-1)	Weather satellite	GTO	Success	
1975-11-06	Thor DSV-2J	Thor 274	Johnston LE-2		Missile defense test tracking target	Suborbital	Success	Last sub-orbital Thor series flight
1975-11-20; 02:06	Delta 2910	Delta 117; Thor 604	CCAFS SLC-17B	Explorer 55 (AE-E)	Atmospheric research satellite	MEO	Success	
1975-12-13; 01:56	Delta 3914	Delta 118; Thor 607	CCAFS SLC-17A	Satcom-1	Communication satellite	GTO	Success	First flight of the Delta 3000 series.

== 1976 ==
There were 12 Thor missiles launched in 1976. 11 of the 12 launches were successful, giving a 91.7% success rate.

Date/Time (UTC)	Rocket	S/N	Launch site	Payload	Function	Orbit	Outcome	Remarks
1976-01-17; 23:28	Delta 2914	Delta 119; Thor 606	CCAFS SLC-17B	CTS 1 Hermes	Experimental communication satellite	GTO	Success	
1976-02-19; 07:52	Thor Burner 2A	Thor 182	VAFB SLC-10W	DMSP-5C-F3	Military weather satellite	planned: LEO / SSO	Failure	Thor stage not loaded with enough kerosene fuel due to incorrect LR79 main engine data sheet entry. Satellite re-entered after one orbit.
1976-02-19; 22:32	Delta 2914	Delta 120; Thor 603	CCAFS SLC-17B	Marisat-1	Communication satellite	GTO	Success	
1976-02-29; 03:30	N-I	N-2 (F)	Tanegashima SLC-N	UME	Ionospheric research satellite	MEO	Success	
1976-03-26; 22:42	Delta 3914	Delta 121; Thor 610	CCAFS SLC-17A	Satcom-2	Communication satellite	GTO	Success	
1976-04-22; 20:46	Delta 2914	Delta 122; Thor 608	CCAFS SLC-17B	NATO 3A	Military communication satellite	GTO	Success	
1976-05-04; 08:00	Delta 2913	Delta 123; Thor 609	VAFB SLC-2W	LAGEOS-1	Geodesic research satellite	MEO	Success	
1976-06-10; 00:09	Delta 2914	Delta 124; Thor 601	CCAFS SLC-17A	Marisat-2	Communication satellite	GTO	Success	
1976-07-08; 23:31	Delta 2914	Delta 125; Thor 611	CCAFS SLC-17A	Palapa-A1	Communication satellite	GTO	Success	
1976-07-29; 17:07	Delta 2310	Delta 126; Thor 605	VAFB SLC-2W	NOAA-5	Weather satellite	LEO / SSO	Success	
1976-09-11; 08:00	Thor DSV-2U	Thor 172	VAFB SLC-10W	DMSP-5D-F1	Military weather satellite	LEO / SSO	Success	
1976-10-14; 22:44	Delta 2914	Delta 127; Thor 614	CCAFS SLC-17A	Marisat-3	Communication satellite	GTO	Success	

== 1977 ==
There were 12 Thor missiles launched in 1977. 10 of the 12 launches were successful, giving an 83.3% success rate.

Date/Time (UTC)	Rocket	S/N	Launch site	Payload	Function	Orbit	Outcome	Remarks
1977-01-28; 00:49	Delta 2914	Delta 128; Thor 613	CCAFS SLC-17A	NATO 3B	Military communication satellite	GTO	Success	
1977-02-23; 08:50	N-I	N-3 (F)	Tanegashima SLC-N	KIKU-2	Experimental communication satellite	GTO	Success	
1977-03-10; 23:16	Delta 2914	Delta 129; Thor 612	CCAFS SLC-17A	Palapa-A2	Communication satellite	GTO	Success	
1977-04-20; 10:15	Delta 2914	Delta 130; Thor 617	CCAFS SLC-17B	ESA-GEOS-1	Magnetosphere research satellite	planned: GTO	Partial failure	Premature separation of second and third stages led to failure of Stage 3 spin up.
1977-06-05; 02:59	Thor DSV-2U	Thor 183	VAFB SLC-10W	DMSP-5D-F2	Military weather satellite	LEO / SSO	Success	
1977-06-16; 10:51	Delta 2914	Delta 131; Thor 616	CCAFS SLC-17B	GOES-B (GOES-2)	Weather satellite	GTO	Success	
1977-07-14; 14:56	Delta 2914	Delta 132; Thor 618	CCAFS SLC-17B	GMS-1	Weather satellite	GTO	Success	
1977-08-25; 23:50	Delta 2313	Delta 133; Thor 615	CCAFS SLC-17B	Sirio-1	Experimental communication satellite	GTO	Success	
1977-09-13; 23:21	Delta 3914	Delta 134; Thor 619	CCAFS SLC-17A	OTS-1	Experimental communication satellite	planned: GTO	Failure	Launch vehicle exploded at T+52 seconds due to a rupture of the SRM #1 casing.
1977-10-22; 13:53	Delta 2914	Delta 135; Thor 623	CCAFS SLC-17B	ISEE-1 (Explorer 56) / ISEE-2	Magnetospheric research satellites	HEO	Success	Joint NASA/ESA Launch
1977-11-23; 01:35	Delta 2914	Delta 136; Thor 620	CCAFS SLC-17A	Meteosat-1	Weather satellite	GTO	Success	
1977-12-15; 00:47	Delta 2914	Delta 137; Thor 624	CCAFS SLC-17B	CS-1	Experimental communication satellite	GTO	Success	

== 1978 ==
There were 12 Thor missiles launched in 1978. All 12 launches were successful.

Date/Time (UTC)	Rocket	S/N	Launch site	Payload	Function	Orbit	Outcome	Remarks
1978-01-26; 17:36	Delta 2914	Delta 138; Thor 613	CCAFS SLC-17A	International Ultraviolet Explorer (Explorer 57)	Astronomical observatory satellite	HEO	Success	Satellite operational until 1996.
1978-02-15; 04:00	N-I	N-4 (F)	Tanegashima SLC-N	UME-2	Ionospheric research satellite	MEO	Success	
1978-03-05; 17:54	Delta 2910	Delta 139; Thor 621	VAFB SLC-2W	Landsat 3	Earth Resource Technology Satellite	917 km LEO, near polar, Sun synchronous.	Success	Satellite decommissioned on March 21, 1983.
7 April 1978; 22:01	Delta 2914	Delta 140; Thor 626	CCAFS, SLC-17B	BSE-1	Direct-broadcast satellite	GTO	Success	First of Japanese BSE series, also known as "Yuri 1".
1978-05-01; 03:05	Thor DSV-2U	Thor 143	VAFB SLC-10W	DMSP-5D-F3	Military weather satellite	LEO / SSO	Success	
1978-05-11; 22:59	Delta 3914	Delta 141; Thor 627	CCAFS SLC-17A	OTS-2	Experimental communication satellite	GTO	Success	
1978-06-16; 10:49	Delta 2914	Delta 142; Thor 625	CCAFS SLC-17B	GOES-C (GOES-3)	Weather satellite	GTO	Success	
1978-07-14; 10:43	Delta 2914	Delta 143; Thor 631	CCAFS SLC-17A	ESA-GEOS-2	Magnetosphere research satellite	GTO	Success	
1978-08-12; 15:12	Delta 2914	Delta 144; Thor 633	CCAFS SLC-17B	ISEE-3 (ICE, Explorer 59)	Magnetospheric research satellite	HEO to Sun-Earth L1 halo orbit Eventually shifted to heliocentric	Success	First satellite to use Lagrangian point and halo orbit Later re-classified as the International Cometary Explorer. Satellite still operational as of 2014.
1978-10-24; 08:14	Delta 2910	Delta 145; Thor 630	VAFB SLC-2W	Nimbus 7 / CAMEO	Weather Satellite / Ionosphere research	LEO / SSO	Success	
1978-11-19; 00:46	Delta 2914	Delta 146; Thor 634	CCAFS SLC-17B	NATO 3C	Military communication satellite	GTO	Success	
1978-12-16; 00:21	Delta 3914	Delta 147; Thor 632	CCAFS SLC-17A	Anik-B1	Communication Satellite	GTO	Success	

== 1979 ==
There were 5 Thor missiles launched in 1979. 4 of the 5 launches were successful, giving an 80% success rate.

Date/Time (UTC)	Rocket	S/N	Launch site	Payload	Function	Orbit	Outcome	Remarks
1979-01-30; 21:42	Delta 2914	Delta 148; Thor 629	CCAFS SLC-17B	SCATHA (P78-2)	Military technological research satellite	HEO	Success	
1979-02-06; 08:46	N-I	N-5 (F)	Tanegashima SLC-N	Ayame	Experimental communication satellite	planned: GTO	Failure	Recontact between satellite and upper stage.
1979-06-06; 18:22	Thor DSV-2U	Thor 264	VAFB SLC-10W	DMSP-5D-F4	Military weather satellite	LEO / SSO	Success	
1979-08-10; 00:20	Delta 2914	Delta 149; Thor 638	CCAFS SLC-17A	Westar-3	Communication Satellite	GTO	Success	
1979-12-07; 01:35	Delta 3914	Delta 150; Thor 622	CCAFS SLC-17A	Satcom-3	Communication satellite	GTO	Success	
