= 1972 in spaceflight =

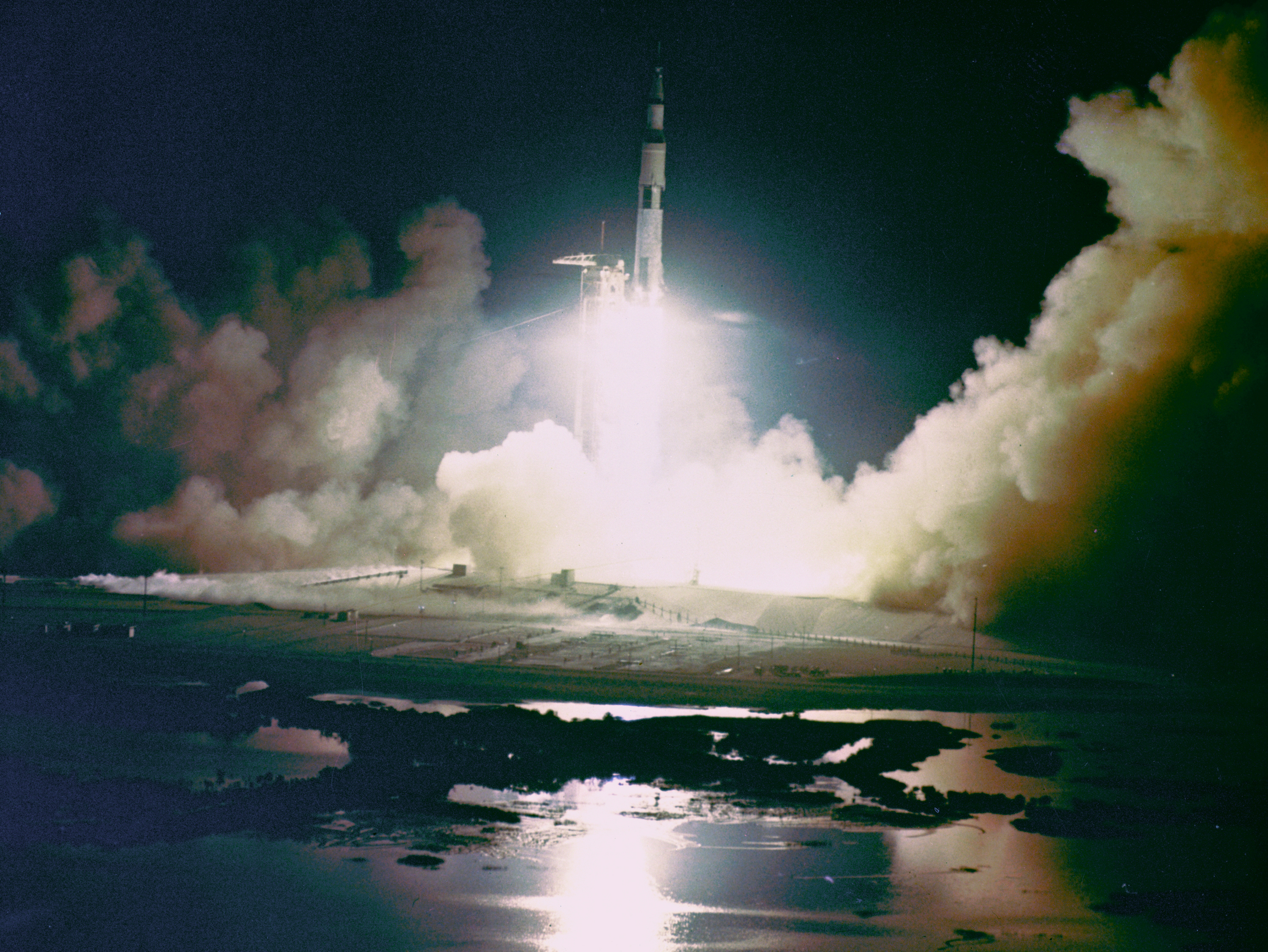
- Launch of Saturn V with the final Apollo mission to the Moon

Orbital launches
- First: 12 January
- Last: 28 December
- Total: 113
- Successes: 105
- Failures: 7
- Partial failures: 1
- Catalogued: 106

Rockets
- Maiden flights: Delta 0100; Delta 1000
- Retirements: Delta L Delta N M-4S; Thorad-Agena

1972 in spaceflight

1972 saw humanity's last crewed mission to the Moon of the 20th century, Apollo 17.

== Launches ==
- ← Jan
- Feb
- Mar
- Apr
- May
- Jun
- Jul
- Aug
- Sep
- Oct
- Nov
- Dec →

Date and time (UTC)	Rocket	Flight number	Launch site		LSP	
Date and time (UTC)	Payload	Operator	Orbit	Function	Decay (UTC)	Outcome
Date and time (UTC)	Remarks					
=== January ===
January 12; 09:59	(Soviet Union) Voskhod		(Soviet Union) Baikonur, LC-31/6		(Soviet Union) RVSN	
January 12; 09:59	(Soviet Union) Kosmos 471 (Zenit 4M/Rotor)	GRU	Low Earth orbit	Reconnaissance	January 25, 1972	Successful
January 20; 18:36	(United States) Titan IIID		(United States) Vandenberg AFB, SLC-4E			
January 20; 18:36	(United States) KH-9 2 (Hexagon 2)	USAF	LEO	Reconnaissance	29 February 1972	Successful
January 20; 18:36	(United States) Mabeli (OPS 7719)	USAF	LEO	ELINT	17 April 1979	Successful
January 23; 00:12	(United States) Atlas SLV-3C Centaur-D	AC-28	(United States) Cape Canaveral, LC-36B			
January 23; 00:12	(United Nations) Intelsat 4 F-4	Intelsat	Geosynchronous	Communications	In orbit	Successful
25 January; 11:15	(Soviet Union) Kosmos-2		(Soviet Union) Plesetsk, Site 133/1		(Soviet Union) RVSN	
25 January; 11:15	(Soviet Union) Kosmos 472 (DS-P1-Yu No. 52)	RVSN	LEO	Radar calibration	18 August 1972	Successful
January 31; 17:20	(United States) Delta L	D-87	Vandenberg AFB, SLC-2E			
January 31; 17:20	HEOS 2	ESRO	High eccentricity LEO/HEO	Particle and field research	August 2, 1974	Successful
January 31; 17:20	Final flight of Delta L					
=== February ===
8 February; 05:59	(Soviet Union) K63D		(Soviet Union) Vladimirovka test range, near Kapustin Yar			
8 February; 05:59	(Soviet Union) BOR-2 No.104		Suborbital	Re-entry test for Spiral program	8 February	Successful
8 February; 05:59	Subscale model of the Spiral spaceplane. Apogee: 100 km					
February 14; 03:27	(Soviet Union) Proton-K/Blok D (8K82K)		(Soviet Union) Baikonur, LC-81/24		(Soviet Union) RVSN	
February 14; 03:27	(Soviet Union) Luna 20		Lunar	Lunar sample return	February 21, 1972 (at Moon)	Successful
=== March ===
March 3; 01:49	(United States) Atlas SLV-3C Centaur/Star 37E	AC-27	(United States) Cape Canaveral, LC-36A			
March 3; 01:49	(United States) Pioneer 10	NASA	Heliocentric to Solar Escape	Jupiter flyby	In orbit	Successful
March 3; 01:49	First spacecraft to cross asteroid belt. First flyby of Jupiter. First probe to leave Solar System					
March 12; 01:55	(United States) Delta N	D-88	(United States) Vandenberg AFB, SLC-2E			
March 12; 01:55	TD-1A	ESRO	LEO	Technology research	January 9, 1980	Successful
March 12; 01:55	Final flight of Delta N					
March 24; 08:46	(United States) Thor-LV2F Burner-2A		(United States) Vandenberg AFB, SLC-10W		(United States) US Air Force	
March 24; 08:46	(United States) DMSP 5B F2	US Air Force	LEO	Weather satellite	In orbit	Successful
March 27; 04:15	(Soviet Union) Molniya-M/MVL		(Soviet Union) Baikonur Cosmodrome, 31/6		Soviet Union	
March 27; 04:15	(Soviet Union) Venera 8	USSR	Heliocentric to Venus	Venus lander	July 22, 1972 (on Venus)	Successful
=== April ===
April 16; 17:45	(United States) Saturn V		(United States) Kennedy, LC-39A		(United States) NASA	
April 16; 17:45	(United States) Apollo 16 CSM "Casper"	NASA	Lunar	Crewed lunar orbiter	April 27, 1972	Successful
April 16; 17:45	(United States) Apollo 16 lunar module "Orion"	NASA	Lunar	Crewed lunar lander	April 20, 1972; 14:23 (at Moon)	Successful
April 16; 17:45	(United States) Apollo 16 Subsatellite	NASA	Lunar	Lunar particles research	May 29, 1972 (at Moon)	Partial failure
April 16; 17:45	Crewed spaceflight to the Moon with 3 astronauts. Subsatellite placed in wrong orbit, shorter lifespan than planned					
April 19; 21:43	(United States) Thorad Agena-D SLV-2H		(United States) Vandenberg AFB, SLC-3W		(United States) US Air Force	
April 19; 21:43	(United States) KH-4B 1116	USAF	LEO	Reconnaissance	May 12, 1972	Successful
=== May ===
May 25; 18:41	(United States) Thorad Agena-D SLV-2H		(United States) Vandenberg AFB, SLC-3W		(United States) US Air Force	
May 25; 18:41	(United States) KH-4B 1117	USAF	LEO	Reconnaissance	June 4, 1972	
May 25; 18:41	Final flight of Thorad-Agena					
=== June ===
June 13; 21:53	(United States) Atlas SLV-3C Centaur	AC-29	(United States) Cape Canaveral, LC-36B			
June 13; 21:53	(United Nations) Intelsat 4 F-5	Intelsat	Geosynchronous	Communications	In orbit	Successful
June 26; 14:53	(Soviet Union) Soyuz (11A511)		(Soviet Union) Baikonur, LC-1/5		(Soviet Union) RVSN	
June 26; 14:53	(Soviet Union) Kosmos 496 (Soyuz 7K-T)		LEO	Test redesigned Soyuz 7K-T spacecraft	July 2, 1972	Successful
=== July ===
July 23; 18:41	(United States) Delta 0900	D-89	(United States) Vandenberg AFB, SLC-2W			
July 23; 18:41	(United States) Landsat 1	NASA	LEO	Earth resources satellite	In orbit	Successful
July 23; 18:41	Maiden flight of Delta 0100 series					
=== August ===
10 August; 00:32	(China) Feng Bao 1	701-02	(China) Jiuquan Satellite Launch Center, LA-2B (Site 138)			
10 August; 00:32	(China) Shiyan Peizhong		Suborbital	Test flight	T+90 seconds	Successful
10 August; 00:32	First suborbital test flight of Feng Bao 1, apogee: 200 km.					
13 August; 15:10	(United States) Scout D-1		(United States) Wallops Flight Facility, LA-3			
13 August; 15:10	(United States) Explorer 46 (MTS)	NASA	LEO	Meteoroid research	2 November 1979	Successful
August 19; 02:40	(Japan) M-4S		(Japan) Kagoshima Space Center, LP-M		(Japan) NASDA	
August 19; 02:40	(Japan) Denpa (REXS)	ISAS	Highly elliptical orbit	Magnetosphere research	19 May 1980	Spacecraft failure
August 19; 02:40	Final flight of M-4S. The satellite stopped transmitting several days after launch, due to high voltage arcing					
August 21; 10:28	(United States) Atlas SLV-3C Centaur	AC-22	(United States) Cape Canaveral, LC-36B			
August 21; 10:28	(United States) OAO 3	NASA	LEO	Ultraviolet astronomy	In orbit	Successful
August 21; 10:28	Final flight of Atlas SLV-3C Centaur					
=== September ===
September 23; 01:20	(United States) Delta 1604 (1604)	D-90	(United States) Cape Canaveral, LC-17B			
September 23; 01:20	(United States) Explorer 47	NASA	HEO	Magnetosphere research	In orbit	Successful
September 23; 01:20	Maiden flight of Delta 1000 series. Maiden flight of Extended Long-Tank Thor stage					
=== October ===
October 2; 20:09	(United States) Atlas F Burner II		(United States) Vandenberg AFB, BMRS-A1		(United States) US Air Force	
October 2; 20:09	(United States) OPS 8180 (RADCAT)	USAF	LEO	Radar calibration	2 August 2012	Successful
October 2; 20:09	(United States) Radsat	USAF	LEO	Gamma radiation research	In orbit	Successful
October 15; 17:19	(United States) Delta 0300	D-91	(United States) Vandenberg AFB, SLC-2W			
October 15; 17:19	(United States) NOAA 2 (ITOS-B)	NOAA	LEO	Weather satellite	In orbit	Successful
October 15; 17:19	(United States) AMSAT-OSCAR 6	AMSAT	LEO	Amateur radio	In orbit	Successful
=== November ===
November 9; 03:23	(United States) Thor Burner II		(United States) Vandenberg AFB, SLC-10W		(United States) US Air Force	
November 9; 03:23	(United States) DMSP 5B F3	USAF	LEO	Weather	In orbit	Successful
November 10; 01:14	(United States) Delta 1914	D-92	(United States) Cape Canaveral, LC-17B			
November 10; 01:14	(Canada) Anik A1	Telesat	Geosynchronous	Communications	In orbit	Successful
=== December ===
December 7; 05:33	(United States) Saturn V		(United States) Kennedy, LC-39A		(United States) NASA	
December 7; 05:33	(United States) Apollo 17 CSM "America"	NASA	Lunar	Crewed lunar orbiter	December 19, 1971	Successful
December 7; 05:33	(United States) Apollo 17 lunar module "Challenger"	NASA	Lunar	Crewed lunar lander	December 14, 1971 (at Moon)	Successful
December 7; 05:33	Crewed spaceflight to the Moon with 3 astronauts. Final flight of Apollo program.					
December 11; 07:56	(United States) Delta 0900	D-93	(United States) Vandenberg AFB, SLC-2W			
December 11; 07:56	(United States) Nimbus 5	NASA	LEO	Environmental research	In orbit	Successful
December 16; 11:24	(United States) Scout D-1		(United States) Vandenberg AFB, SLC-5		NASA	
December 16; 11:24	(United States) (Germany) Aeros 1	NASA/BMwF			In orbit	Successful
December 20; 22:20	(United States) Atlas SLV-3A Agena-D		(United States) Cape Canaveral, LC-13		(United States) US Air Force	
December 20; 22:20	(United States) OPS 9390 Canyon 5	USAF	Geosynchronous	SIGINT	In orbit	Successful

- ← Jan
- Feb
- Mar
- Apr
- May
- Jun
- Jul
- Aug
- Sep
- Oct
- Nov
- Dec →

== Launches from the Moon ==
Date and time (UTC)	Rocket	Flight number	Launch site		LSP	
Date and time (UTC)	Payload (⚀ = CubeSat)	Operator	Orbit	Function	Decay (UTC)	Outcome
Date and time (UTC)	Remarks					
22 February; 22:58	(Soviet Union) Luna 20 Ascent stage		Terra Apollonius (Luna)			
22 February; 22:58	(Soviet Union) Luna 20 Return capsule	(Soviet Union)	Highly elliptical	Sample return	25 February	Successful
22 February; 22:58	Second uncrewed lunar sample return mission					
24 April; 01:25:47	(United States) Lunar Module Ascent Stage		Descartes Highlands (Luna)		(United States) NASA	
24 April; 01:25:47	(United States) Apollo 16 LM	NASA	Selenocentric (CSM)	Crewed	Unknown	Successful
24 April; 01:25:47	Carrying two astronauts back to CSM after lunar landing					
14 December; 22:54:37	(United States) Lunar Module Ascent Stage		Taurus-Littrow (Luna)		(United States) NASA	
14 December; 22:54:37	(United States) Apollo 17 LM	NASA	Selenocentric (CSM)	Crewed	15 December; 06:50	Successful
14 December; 22:54:37	Carrying two astronauts back to CSM after lunar landing					

== Deep space rendezvous in 1972 ==
- February 21 – Luna 20, 55g from Apollonius Crater (sample return mission)
- April 21 – Apollo 16, 95 kg from Descartes Highlands (sample return mission)
- July 22 – Venera 8 atmospheric probe worked for 50 min on the Venerian surface
- December 11 – Apollo 17, 111 kg from Taurus–Littrow (sample return mission)
