= ISIS (satellite) =

Satellites studying Earth's inosphere

ISIS 1 / ISIS-A
- Operator: CSA / NASA
- COSPAR ID: 1969-009A
- SATCAT no.: 03669

Spacecraft properties
- Manufacturer: RCA Victor
- Launch mass: 241.0 kilograms (531.3 lb)

Start of mission
- Launch date: 30 January 1969, 06:43:00 UTC
- Rocket: Delta E1 485/D65
- Launch site: Vandenberg SLC-2E

Orbital parameters
- Reference system: Geocentric
- Regime: LEO
- Eccentricity: 0.017475
- Perigee altitude: 578 kilometres (359 mi)
- Apogee altitude: 3,526 kilometres (2,191 mi)
- Inclination: 82.42º
- Period: 128.42 minutes

ISIS 2 / ISIS-B
- Operator: CSA / NASA
- COSPAR ID: 1971-024A
- SATCAT no.: 05104

Spacecraft properties
- Manufacturer: RCA Victor
- Launch mass: 264.0 kilograms (582.0 lb)

Start of mission
- Launch date: 01 April 1971, 02:53:00 UTC
- Rocket: Delta E1
- Launch site: Vandenberg SLC-2E

Orbital parameters
- Reference system: Geocentric
- Regime: LEO
- Eccentricity: 0.0045
- Perigee altitude: 1,358 kilometres (844 mi)
- Apogee altitude: 1,458 kilometres (906 mi)
- Inclination: 88.1º
- Period: 113.6 minutes

ISIS 1 and 2 (International Satellites for Ionospheric Studies) were the third and fourth in a series of Canadian satellites launched to study the ionosphere over one complete solar cycle. After the success of Canada's Alouette 1, Canada and the United States jointly sent up three more satellites in the ISIS program. The first was named Alouette 2 (after originally being named ISIS-X). As was the case for the Alouette satellites, RCA Ltd. of Montreal was the prime contractor for both ISIS 1 and 2.

A third satellite, ISIS 3, was scheduled for construction, but when the government's focus shifted toward communications satellites, it was cancelled in 1969. The funds were instead used to produce the Communications Technology Satellite (also known as Hermes), which was launched in 1976.

== ISIS 1 ==
ISIS 1 (1969-009A, ISIS-A or 03669) was launched at 6h43 UTC on January 30, 1969, by a Delta rocket at the Western test range at Vandenberg AFB in California.

Unlike the Alouette satellites, ISIS had complex navigational equipment and a tape recorder to record some experiments when they were out of communications range and play back the results when the satellites came over Canada again. Some other experiments were not recorded but data was sent in over several stations around the globe. In total it conducted 10 experiments.

== ISIS 2 ==
ISIS 2 (1971-024A, ISIS-B, PL-7O1F or 05104) was launched at 2h53 UTC on April 1, 1971, on a Delta rocket also from the Western test range at Vandenberg AFB in California. Due to budget constraints, the design of ISIS 2 was largely similar to that of ISIS I. The main difference was the addition of two experiments designed to study atmospheric optical emissions, including a photometer. This allowed images to be taken for the first time of an Aurora Borealis as seen from above. James Gosling wrote some of the software to analyze data from ISIS 2, as a high school student working for the University of Calgary physics department.

On March 13, 1984, both ISIS 1 and ISIS 2 were loaned to Japan's Communications Research Laboratory, which continued to operate the satellites until 1990, when they were shut down due to deterioration of battery capacity.

== See also ==
- Polar wind
- Alouette 1
- Alouette 2
