= Landsat 1 =

American earth observation satellite (1972–1978)

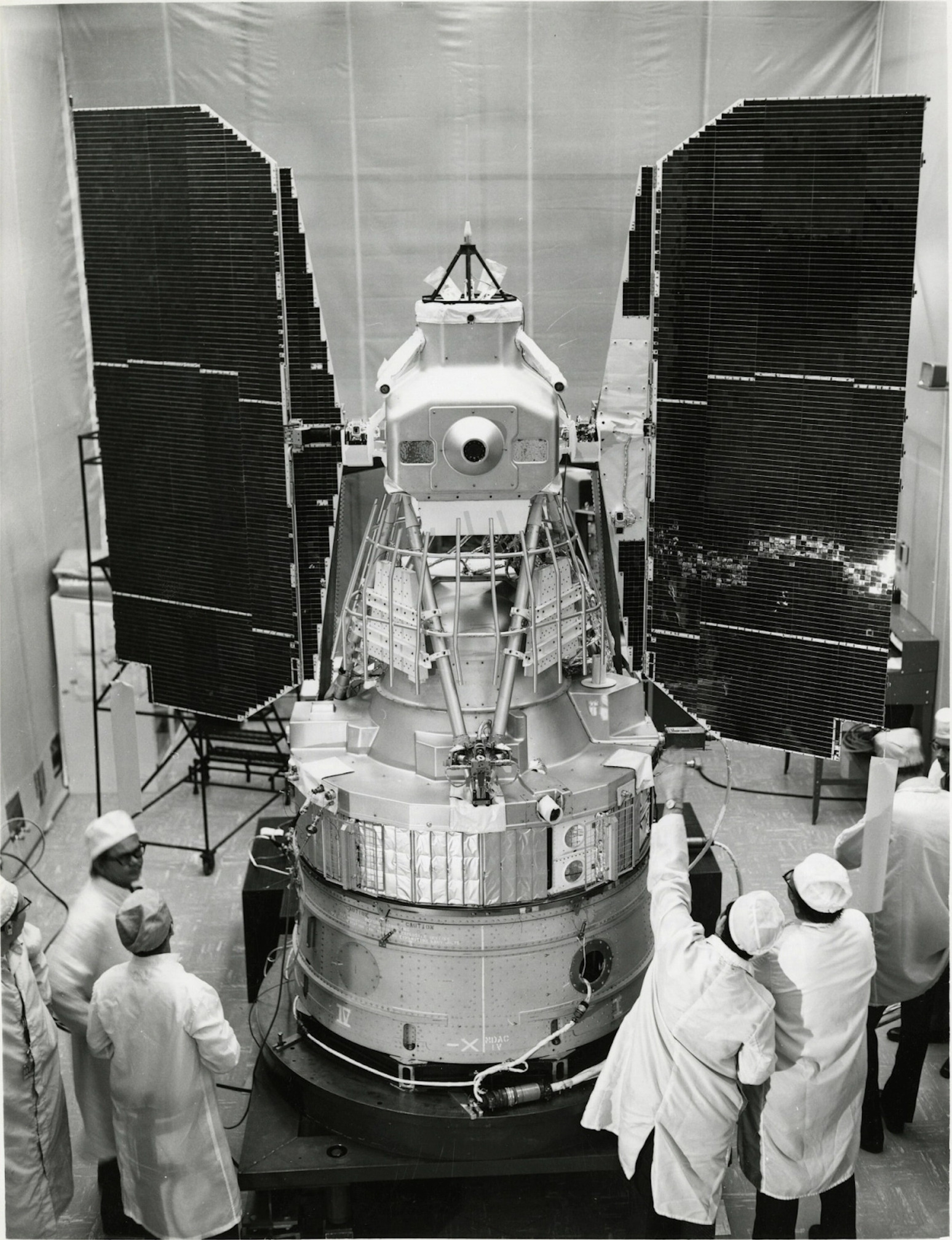
- Landsat 1 in flight configuration with solar panels deployed after tests at the G.E. Valley Forge Plant.
- Mission type: Earth imaging
- Operator: NASA
- COSPAR ID: 1972-058A
- SATCAT no.: 06126
- Mission duration: 5 years, 5 months and 14 days

Spacecraft properties
- Manufacturer: GE Aerospace
- Launch mass: 1,800 kg (4,000 lb)

Start of mission
- Launch date: 23 July 1972, 18:06 UTC
- Rocket: Delta 900
- Launch site: Vandenberg SLC-2W

End of mission
- Disposal: Decommissioned
- Deactivated: 6 January 1978

Orbital parameters
- Reference system: Geocentric
- Regime: Sun-synchronous
- Semi-major axis: 7,280 km (4,520 mi)
- Perigee altitude: 902 km (560 mi)
- Apogee altitude: 917 km (570 mi)
- Inclination: 99.1 degrees
- Period: 117.04 minutes
- Epoch: August 26, 1972

Landsat 1 (LS-1), formerly named Earth Resources Technology Satellite ERTS-A or ERTS-1, was the first satellite of the United States' Landsat program. It was a modified version of the Nimbus 4 meteorological satellite and was launched on July 23, 1972, by a Delta 0900 rocket from Vandenberg Air Force Base in California.

It was the first satellite to carry a Multispectral Scanner.

The near-polar orbiting spacecraft served as a stabilized, Earth-oriented platform for obtaining information on agricultural and forestry resources, geology and mineral resources, hydrology and water resources, geography, cartography, environmental pollution, oceanography and marine resources, and meteorological phenomena.

== Background ==
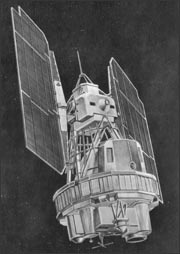
Sketch of Landsat 1. Designed for weather satellites of the time, Landsat 1 was noticeably similar to the Nimbus satellites.

The multi-agency Earth Resources Satellites Program was begun in 1966 by the Department of the Interior. The goal of the program was to gather data from the Earth via remote sensing techniques. The following year a feasibility study was performed for the Earth Resources Technology Satellite (later named the Landsat 1). The Bureau of Budget (BOB) did not grant funding to build the satellite, but provided $2 million to continue the feasibility studies.

== Satellite design ==
=== Development ===
Definition studies for two Earth observation satellites began in 1967. The satellites were named Earth Resources Technology Satellite and were individually known as ERTS-A and ERTS-B.

In 1970, General Electric was selected as the prime contractor for ERTS-A. It was manufactured by GE's Space Division in Valley Forge.

=== Operation ===
The spacecraft was 3 meters (9.8 ft) tall with a 1.5 m (4.9 ft) diameter. Two solar panel arrays that were 4 m (13 ft) long each, with single axis articulation, generated power for the spacecraft. ERTS-A had a liftoff weight of 953 kilograms (2,101 lb).

The main spacecraft propulsion was three hydrazine thrusters. An attitude control system permitted the spacecraft's orientation to be maintained within plus or minus 0.7 degrees in all three axes.

Spacecraft communications included a command subsystem operating at 154.2 and 2106.4 MHz and a pulse-code modulation (PCM) narrow-band telemetry subsystem, operating at 2287.5 and 137.86 MHz, for spacecraft housekeeping, attitude, and sensor performance data. Video data from the three-camera Return Beam Vidicon (RBV) system was transmitted in both real-time and tape recorder modes at 2265.5 MHz, while information from the multispectral scanner (MSS) was constrained to a 20 MHz radio-frequency bandwidth at 2229.5 MHz.

The satellite also carried two wide-band video tape recorders (WBVTR) capable of storing up to 30 minutes of scanner or camera data, giving the spacecraft's sensors a near-global coverage capability.

The satellite was equipped with a data collection system (DCS) to collect information from remote, individually-equipped ground stations and to relay the data to central acquisition stations. Due to the orbit of the satellite, data could be obtained at a minimum of every 12 hours. No data processing or signal multiplexing occurred on the satellite. The design of the DCS came from the Nimbus 3 platform, then known as the interrogation, recording, and location system (IRLS).

=== Sensors ===
ERTS-A had two sensors to achieve its primary objectives: the return beam (RBV) and the MSS.

The RBV was manufactured by the Radio Corporation of America (RCA). The RBV obtained visible light and near infrared photographic images of Earth. At launch, the RBV was considered the primary sensor.

The MSS was designed by Virginia Norwood at Hughes Aircraft Company, which also manufactured it. Norwood is called "The Mother of Landsat." The sensor was initially considered an experimental sensor, and was the secondary sensor, until scientists reviewed the data that was beamed back to Earth. After the data was reviewed, the MSS was considered the primary sensor. The MSS was a four-channel scanner that obtained radiometric images of Earth.

== Mission ==
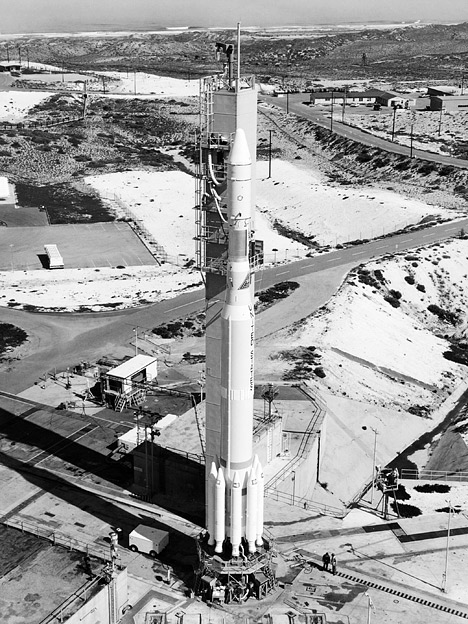
ERTS-A in a Delta 0900 on the pad

=== Launch ===
ERTS-A was launched July 23, 1972, on a Delta 0900 out of Vandenberg Air Force Base in California. The spacecraft was placed in a sun-synchronous orbit, with an altitude between 907 and 915 km. The spacecraft was placed in an orbit with an inclination of 99 degrees which orbited the Earth every 103 minutes. It was the first satellite launched with the sole purpose of studying and monitoring the planet.

Upon reaching orbit, it was renamed to ERTS-1. On January 14, 1975, eight days before ERTS-B was to launch, NASA announced that ERTS-1 was renamed Landsat 1 and ERTS-B would be Landsat 2 after launch.

=== Operations ===
Landsat 1's tape recorders malfunctioned in January 1978, and the satellite was taken out of service.

== Results ==
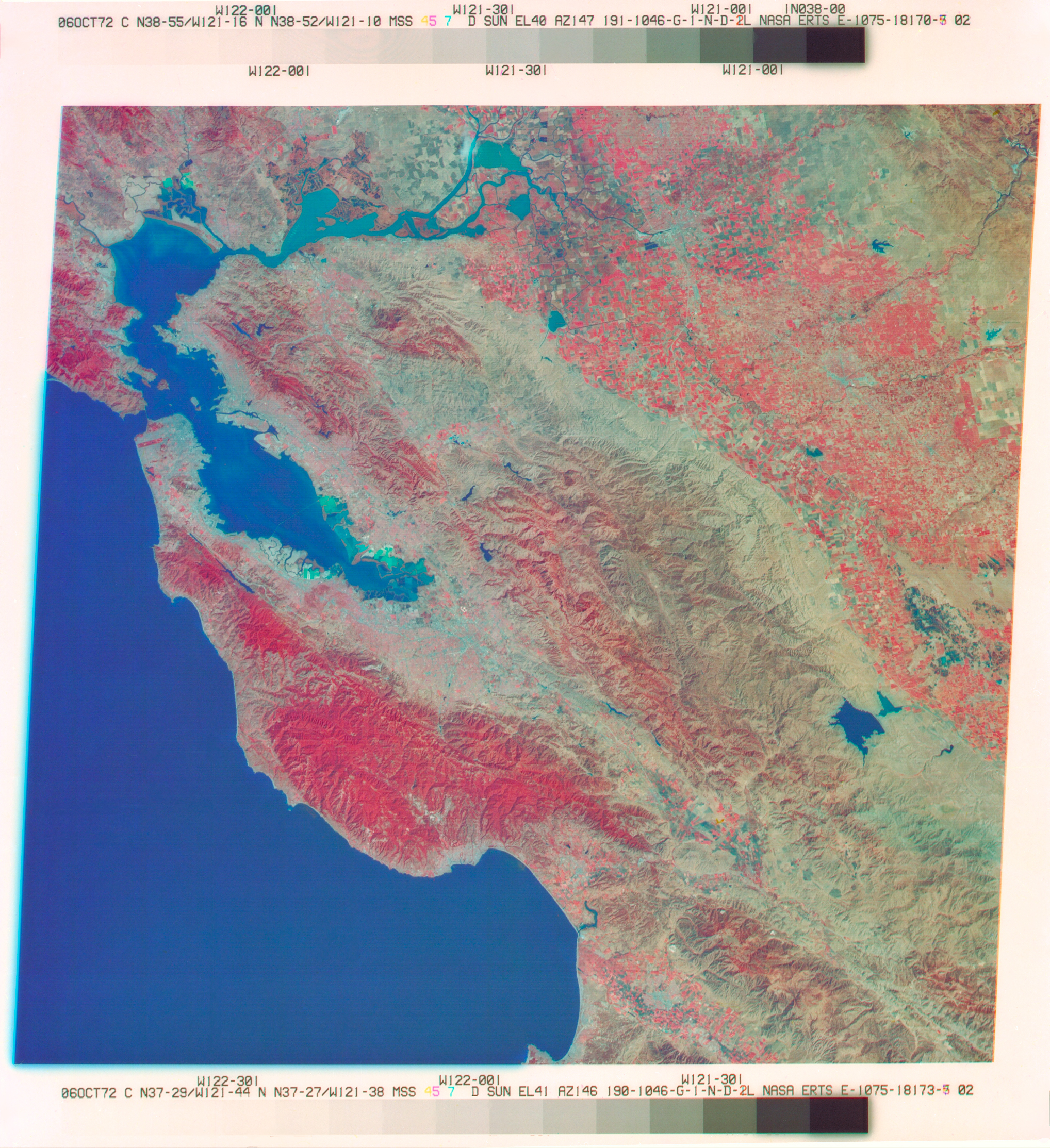
San Francisco Bay Area as imaged by ERTS-1

From launch until 1974, Landsat 1 transmitted over 100,000 images, which covered more than 75% of the Earth's surface. The majority of these images were taken with the multispectral scanner. On 5 August 1972 the return beam vidicon failed after taking only 1690 images.

In 1976, Landsat 1 discovered a tiny uninhabited island 20 kilometers off the eastern coast of Canada. This island was thereafter designated Landsat Island after the satellite.

The MSS provided more than 300,000 images over the lifespan of the satellite. NASA oversaw 300 researchers that evaluated the data that Landsat 1 transmitted back to Earth.

Landsat 1 images were used in the first study of the normalized difference vegetation index (NDVI), now an ubiquitous measure of global plant greenness.
