= Radsat =

Gamma radiation measurement satellite

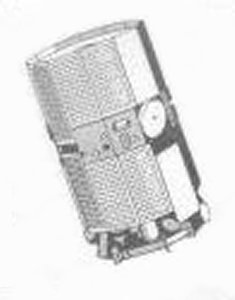
Radsat space observatory satellite

Radsat was a satellite launched by the United States Air Force on 2 October 1972. It was equipped with a gamma-ray spectrometer, an extreme ultraviolet detector, a pair of low-altitude particle detectors, and a thermocontrol coating test instrument. Its mission was to measure gamma radiation.
