= NOAA-3 =

American weather satellite

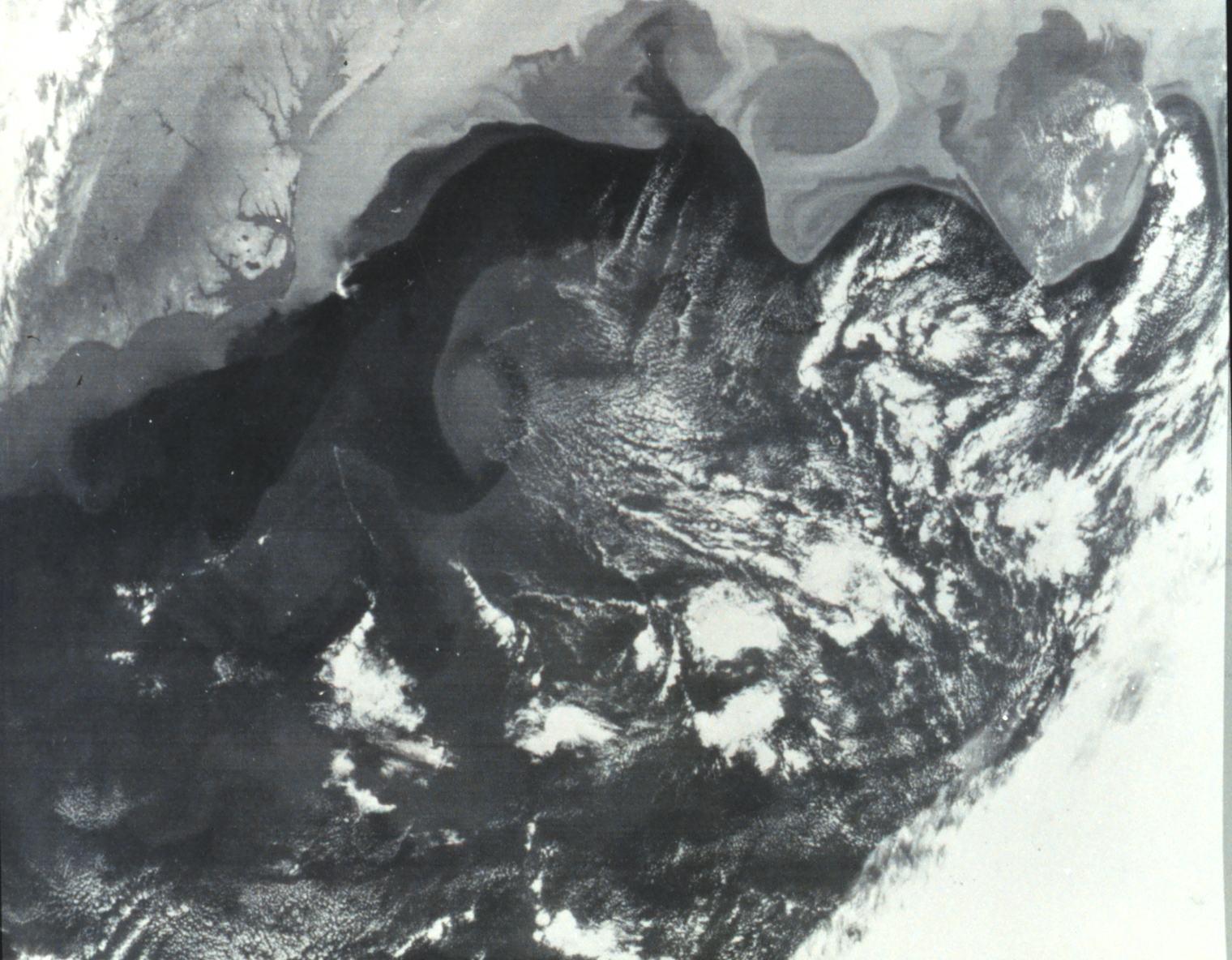
- Gulf Stream is seen as darker water extending to northeast from Cape Hatteras. This image was obtained from the Very High Resolution Radiometer (VHRR) on the NOAA-3 Satellite.
- Mission type: Weather
- Operator: NOAA / NASA
- COSPAR ID: 1973-086A
- SATCAT no.: 6920

Spacecraft properties
- Manufacturer: RCA Astrospace
- Launch mass: 746 kilograms (1,645 lb)

Start of mission
- Launch date: November 6, 1973, 17:02 UTC
- Rocket: Delta-300
- Launch site: Vandenberg SLC-2W

End of mission
- Deactivated: August 1976

Orbital parameters
- Reference system: Geocentric
- Regime: Low Earth; Sun-synchronous
- Perigee altitude: 1,500 kilometers (930 mi)
- Apogee altitude: 1,509 kilometers (938 mi)
- Inclination: 102.1°
- Period: 116.11 minutes
- Epoch: November 6, 1973

NOAA-3, also known as ITOS-F, was a weather satellite operated by the National Oceanic and Atmospheric Administration (NOAA). It was part of a series of satellites called ITOS, or improved TIROS. It was deactivated by NOAA in August 1976.
