= ITOS-E =

American weather satellite

- Mission type: Weather
- Operator: NOAA
- Mission duration: Launch failure

Spacecraft properties
- Manufacturer: RCA Astro
- Launch mass: 747 kilograms (1,647 lb)

Start of mission
- Launch date: July 16, 1973, 00:00 UTC
- Rocket: Delta-300
- Launch site: Vandenberg SLC-2W

Orbital parameters
- Reference system: Geocentric
- Regime: Sun-synchronous
- Epoch: Planned

ITOS-E was a weather satellite operated by the National Oceanic and Atmospheric Administration (NOAA). It was part of a series of satellites called ITOS, or improved TIROS. ITOS-E was released on July 16, 1973, from the Vandenberg Air Force Base, California, with a Delta rocket, but failed to achieve orbit.
