= TD-1A =

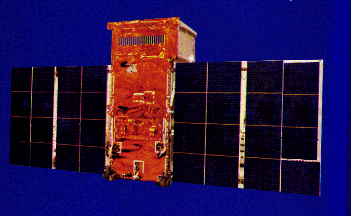
- Mission type: Astrophysics
- Operator: ESRO
- COSPAR ID: 1972-014A
- SATCAT no.: 05879

Spacecraft properties
- Launch mass: 473 kilograms (1,043 lb)

Start of mission
- Launch date: 12 March 1972, 01:55:08 UTC
- Rocket: Delta N D88
- Launch site: Vandenberg SLC-2E

End of mission
- Decay date: 9 January 1980

Orbital parameters
- Reference system: Geocentric
- Regime: Low Earth
- Perigee altitude: 525 kilometres (326 mi)
- Apogee altitude: 544 kilometres (338 mi)
- Inclination: 97.5 degrees
- Period: 95.32 minutes
- Epoch: 11 May 1972, 19:00:00 UTC

TD-1A, or Thor-Delta 1A (or just TD-1), was a European astrophysical research satellite which was launched in 1972. Operated by the European Space Research Organisation, TD-1A made astronomical surveys primarily in the ultraviolet, but also using x-ray and gamma ray detectors.

== Spacecraft ==
TD-1A was named after the Thor-Delta series of rockets, a derivative of which was used to launch it. It was a 473-kilogram (1,043 lb) satellite which measured 100 centimetres (39 in) by 90 centimetres (35 in) by 220 centimetres (87 in). The spacecraft was three-axis stabilised, with Sun sensors used to maintain a constant attitude with respect to the Sun.

=== Instruments ===
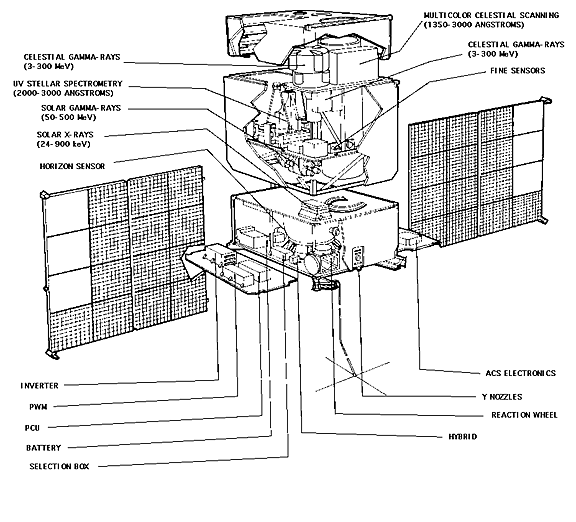
Diagram of the TD-1A satellite with its various detectors labeled.

Seven instruments were carried aboard TD-1A, with a combined mass of 120 kilograms (260 lb).

The Stellar UV Radiation Experiment, operated by University College London and the University of Liège, consisted of a 1.4-metre (4 ft 7 in) ultraviolet telescope, attached to a spectrometer. It was used to study extinction and to produce a star catalogue using ultraviolet observations. UV range 135 to 255 nm.

The UV Stellar Spectrometer was operated by the Astronomical Institute of Utrecht University. It consisted of a grating spectrometer attached to a 26 centimetres (10 in) Cassegrain reflector telescope. UV measurements at 216, 255 & 286 nm.

Spectrometry of Primary Charged Particles was an experiment conducted by the Saclay Nuclear Research Centre, which studied cosmic rays, and measured their charge spectra.

Spectrometry of Celestial X-Rays was another payload operated by the Saclay Nuclear Research Centre. It consisted of two slot collimators and a proportional counter, which were used to study the spectra of incident x-rays. Due to an encoder malfunction, the experiment was not operational for most of the first survey; it was deactivated a few months after launch and remained inactive until 1 July 1973; at the start of the second survey.

Solar Gamma-Rays in the 50 to 500 MeV Energy Range was an experiment operated by the University of Milan which was used to measure the flux of solar gamma ray emissions. It consisted of scintillators and photomultipliers, which measured the radiation. The Solar X-Ray Monitor was operated by the Utrecht University. It used a scintillation counter to detect hard x-rays emitted by the Sun. The Saclay Nuclear Research Centre's Gamma-Ray Measurement experiment used a spark chamber to detect gamma rays during the sky survey.

== Launch ==
A Delta N, also known as the Thor-Delta N, was used to place it into orbit. The launch occurred at 01:55:08 UTC, from Space Launch Complex 2E at Vandenberg Air Force Base. The launch of TD-1A marked the final flight of the Delta N, and the last launch from Space Launch Complex 2E.

TD-1A was placed into a low Earth orbit; on 11 April 1974 it was tracked in an orbit with a perigee of 525 kilometres (326 mi), an apogee of 544 kilometres (338 mi), 97.5 degrees of inclination, and a period of 95.32 minutes.

== Operation ==
TD-1A operated for twenty six months, conducting two complete sky surveys, and completing approximately half of a third scan, in all mapping 95 per cent of the sky. By maintaining a constant orientation to the Sun, TD-1A was able to scan a thin band of the sky on each orbit, and Earth's movement around the Sun enabled it to scan the entire sky over a period of six months.

TD-1A was affected by reliability issues with an onboard tape recorder, used to store experimental data for transmission to Earth, however the fault was intermittent, and still enabled the completion of the spacecraft's mission. An encoder problem led to the Spectrometry of Celestial X-rays experiment not being run during the first survey, however this was activated in time for the second survey, and was still completed successfully.

In May 1974, TD-1A ceased operations when its attitude control system depleted its last remaining propellant, leaving it unable to maintain its orientation. It decayed from orbit and reentered the atmosphere on 9 January 1980.
