= Vandenberg Space Launch Complex 2 =

Rocket launch site at Vandenberg Space Force Base in the USA

Space Launch Complex 2
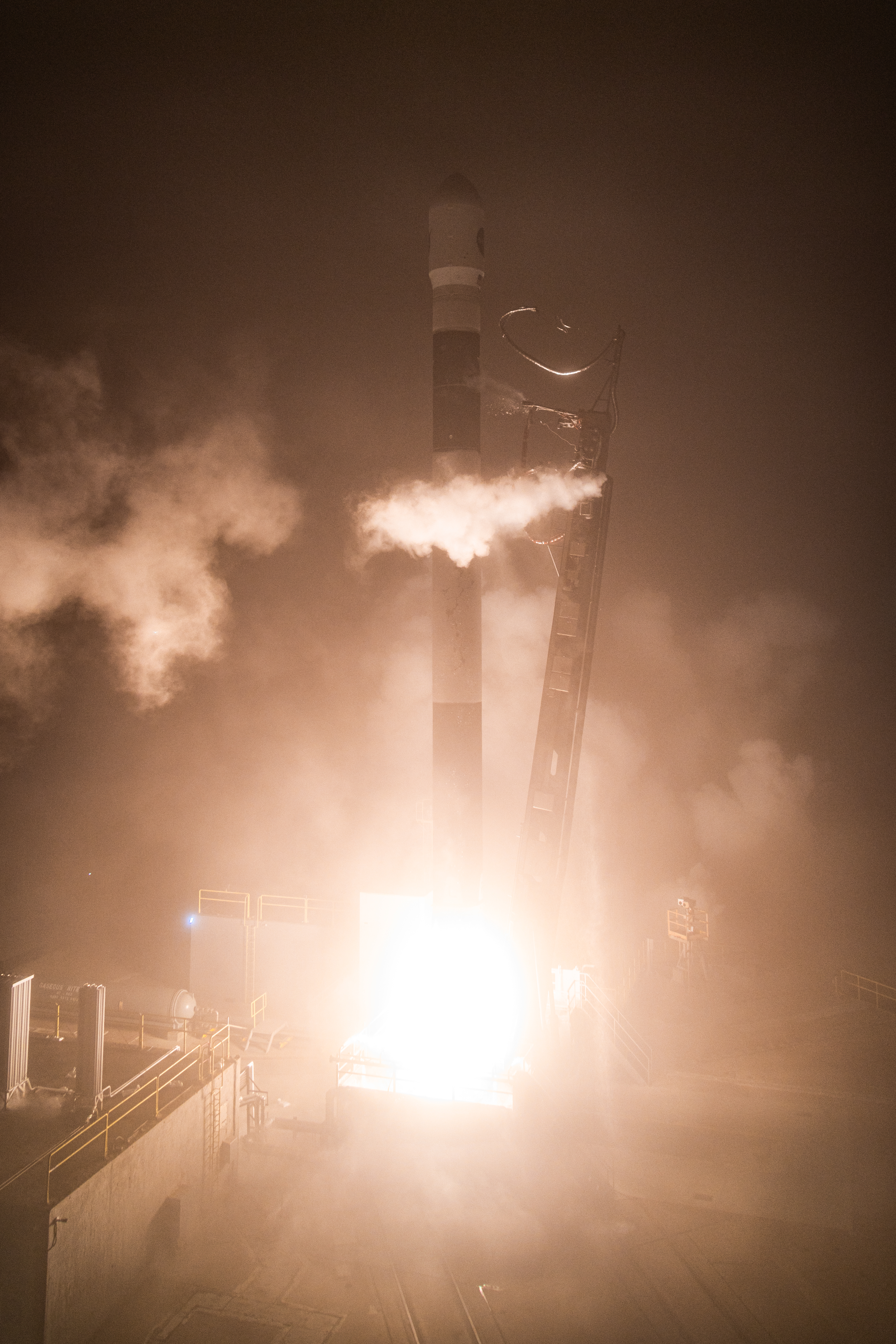
- SLC-2W in July 2024, launching Firefly Alpha VCLS Demo-2FB
- Interactive map of Space Launch Complex 2
- Launch site: Vandenberg Space Force Base
- Location: 34°45′16″N 120°37′11″W
- Time zone: UTC−08:00 (PST)
  - Summer (DST): UTC−07:00 (PDT)
- Short name: SLC-2
- Operator: United States Space Force (owner); Firefly Aerospace (tenant)
- Total launches: 158
- Launch pad: 2
- Orbital inclination range: 51° – 145°
SLC-2W launch history
- Status: Active
- Launches: 106
- First launch: 17 September 1959; PGM-17 Thor
- Last launch: 12 March 2026; Firefly Alpha ("Stairway To Seven")
- Associated rockets: Current: Firefly Alpha; Future: Eclipse; Retired: PGM-17 Thor, Thor-Agena, Delta I, Delta II
SLC-2E launch history
- Status: Inactive
- Launches: 52
- First launch: 16 December 1958; PGM-17 Thor
- Last launch: 12 March 1972; Delta N (TD-1A)
- Associated rockets: Retired: PGM-17 Thor, Delta I, Thor-Agena, Thorad-Agena

Space Launch Complex 2 (SLC-2) is an active rocket launch site at Vandenberg Space Force Base, in California, USA. It consists of two launch pads: Space Launch Complex 2 East (SLC-2E, originally LC 75-1-1), used by the PGM-17 Thor missile and several of its derivatives from 1958 to 1972; and Space Launch Complex 2 West (SLC-2W, originally LC 75-1-2), which has been in use since 1959 to launch the Thor-Delta family and Delta II, and is currently used by the Firefly Alpha.

Space Launch Complex 2 was originally part of Launch Complex 75 (LC 75) and was known by designation LC 75-1 or just 75-1 (and the launch pads were designated LC 75-1-1 and LC 75–1–2). The first launch out of the newly designated Space Launch Complex 2 was that of a Delta E with ESSA-3 on 2 October 1966 from SLC-2E.

SLC-2E and SLC-2W are located approximately 2,000 feet (610 m) apart.

== SLC-2W ==
=== Thor and Thor-Agena (1959–1968) ===
Space Launch Complex 2 West (originally Launch Complex 75–1–2) was built in the late 1950s to launch the PGM-17 Thor for use in suborbital tests, being jointly operated by the United States Air Force and the Royal Air Force in accordance to the IRBM's stationing in Britain as part of Project Emily. It saw its first launch on September 17, 1959, with launches being held over the next four months and all but one being successful. Following the last flight on January 21, 1960, the pad underwent the conversion into an orbital launch complex, as the Thor got decommissioned from missile use and was replaced by ICBMs such as the LGM-25C Titan II.

As per its new use, LC 75-1-2 was subsequently designed to launch the Thor-Agena and the Thor-Ablestar to complement the nearby SLC-1E and 1W in its capabilities of putting satellites into polar orbit. Over the next seven years, it was put into use 21 times for nineteen Agena and two Ablestar launches, with the overwhelming majority of payloads being reconnaissance satellites such as the KH-4 for military customers like the National Reconnaissance Office.

=== Early Delta (1969–1989) ===
With the Department of Defense seeing its payloads grow in size throughout the late 1960s (as seen by satellites such as the KH-9 and KH-11 getting developed), both the Thor-Agena and Thor-Ablestar were retired and the pad received another modification under the SLC-2W name, this time to act as the west coast site of the Thor-Delta and its derivatives to complement LC-17 at Cape Canaveral. Throughout this period of the pad's history, 26 Delta launches were performed at the site, carrying various payloads for the DoD, NASA, NOAA, and a handful of international agencies such as ESA. During the late 70s, a mobile service tower was constructed at SLC-2W to help support the various Delta evolutions by creating an enclosed environment.

As the 1980s arrived and went along, the site gradually saw slowing use in the wake of the Delta family's expected replacement with the Space Shuttle, which was slated to have its own west coast launch site at SLC-6. Despite all California Shuttle plans getting axed following the Space Shuttle Challenger disaster in 1986, SLC-2W only saw one last liftoff in this configuration on November 18, 1989, with a Delta 5000 being used to launch the Cosmic Background Explorer (COBE) for NASA.

=== Delta II (1995–2018) ===
After getting mothballed for a half decade, McDonnell Douglas revived SLC-2W in 1994 for use as the polar orbit site of their successor to the Thor-Delta rockets, the Delta II. The first launch in this new era was on November 4, 1995, carrying Radarsat-1 for the Canadian Space Agency and a Deep Space Network test satellite for NASA. Over the next 23 years, the pad saw 45 Delta II launches and delivered various payloads to polar orbit for numerous governmental agencies and commercial customers. Among the more notable payloads of this era are Aqua, Aura, Gravity Probe B, and the Wide-field Infrared Survey Explorer (WISE).

Additionally, SLC-2W followed the Delta II in changing hands regarding operation; it went from McDonnell Douglas to Boeing following their merger in 1997, and was subsequently passed to United Launch Alliance following the 2006 formation of the Boeing-Lockheed Martin joint venture. The site eventually wound down in use again throughout the 2010s following the Delta II's retirement from Cape Canaveral in 2011, and saw its last flight of a Thor-derived vehicle (and last launch of one in general) with the launch of ICESat-2 on September 12, 2018.

=== Firefly Aerospace (2019–present) ===
Following the Delta II's retirement, SLC-2W was leased out to Firefly Aerospace and repurposed to launch the Firefly Alpha. During the demolition process, a fire broke out inside the Delta II mobile service tower on October 15, 2020, though no injuries were reported. The maiden flight of Alpha took place on September 3, 2021, and resulted in a flight failure following an engine failure causing a range safety activation at transonic speeds. Firefly would not attempt a second flight until October 1, 2022, which was successful in reaching orbit. That same year, Firefly and Northrop Grumman announced their collaborative Medium Launch Vehicle (now known as Eclipse) was in development, and that it will also be using SLC-2W as a polar launch site.

=== Gallery ===
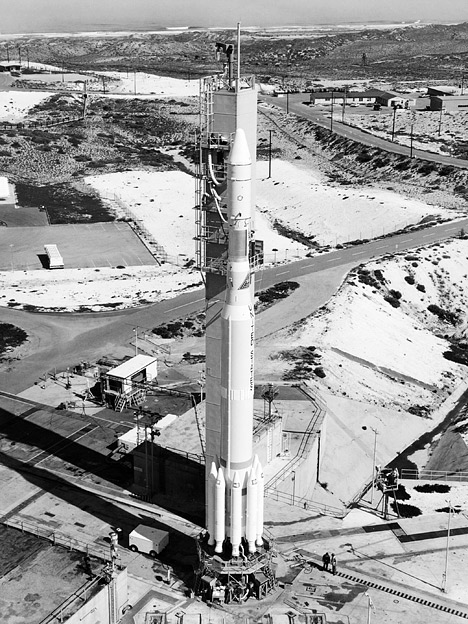
SLC-2W in 1972, preparing to launch Landsat-1

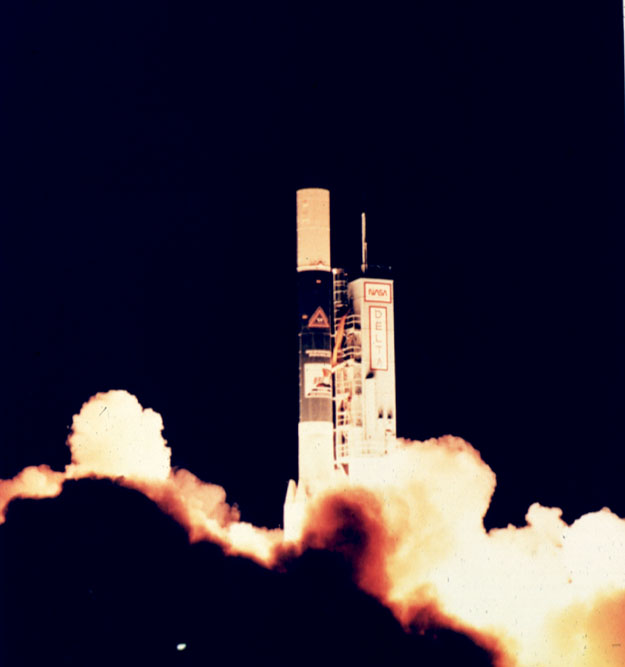
A Delta 5000 carrying COBE launching from SLC-2W in 1989

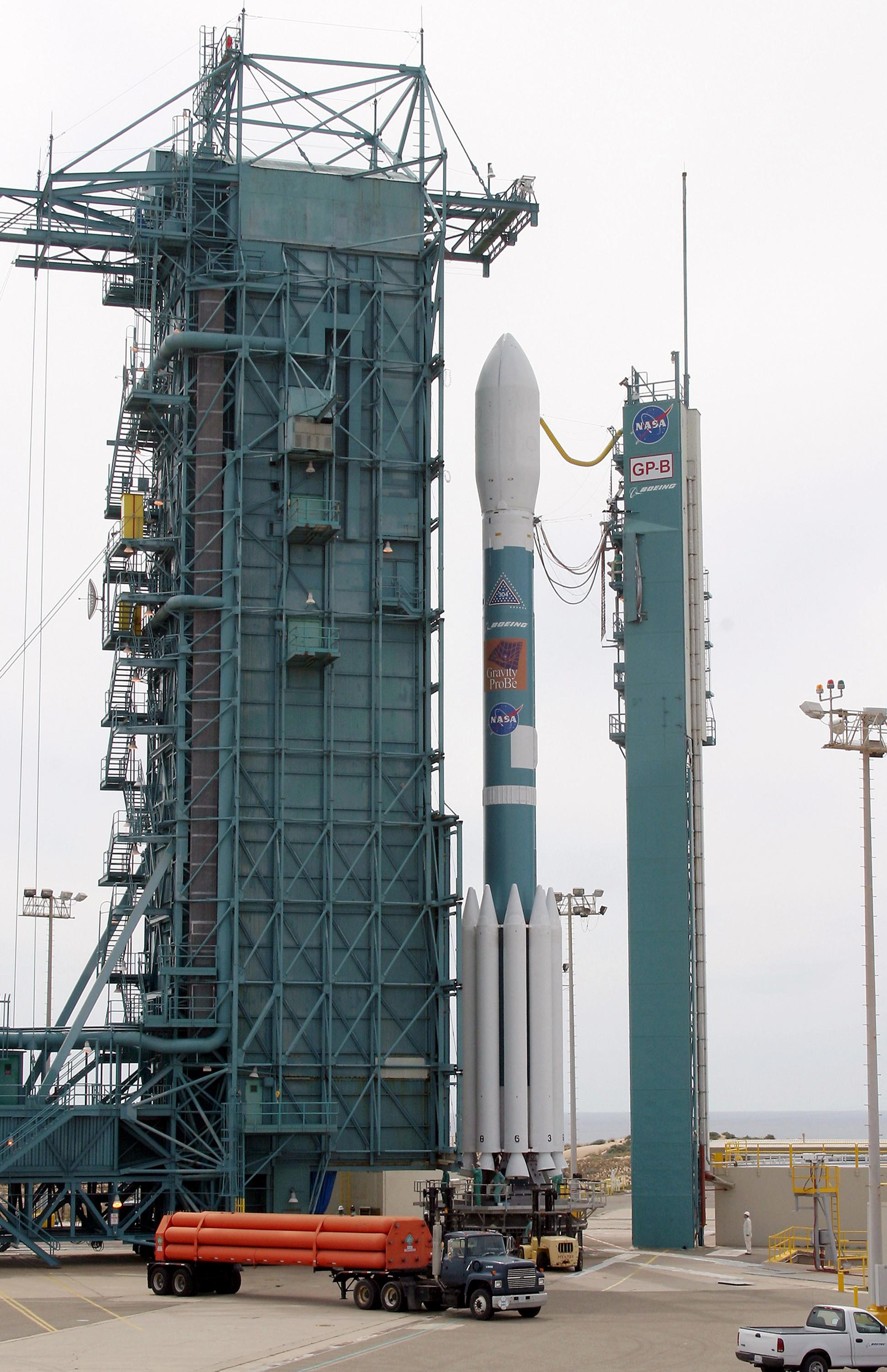
SLC-2W during its Delta II years, carrying Gravity Probe B in 2004

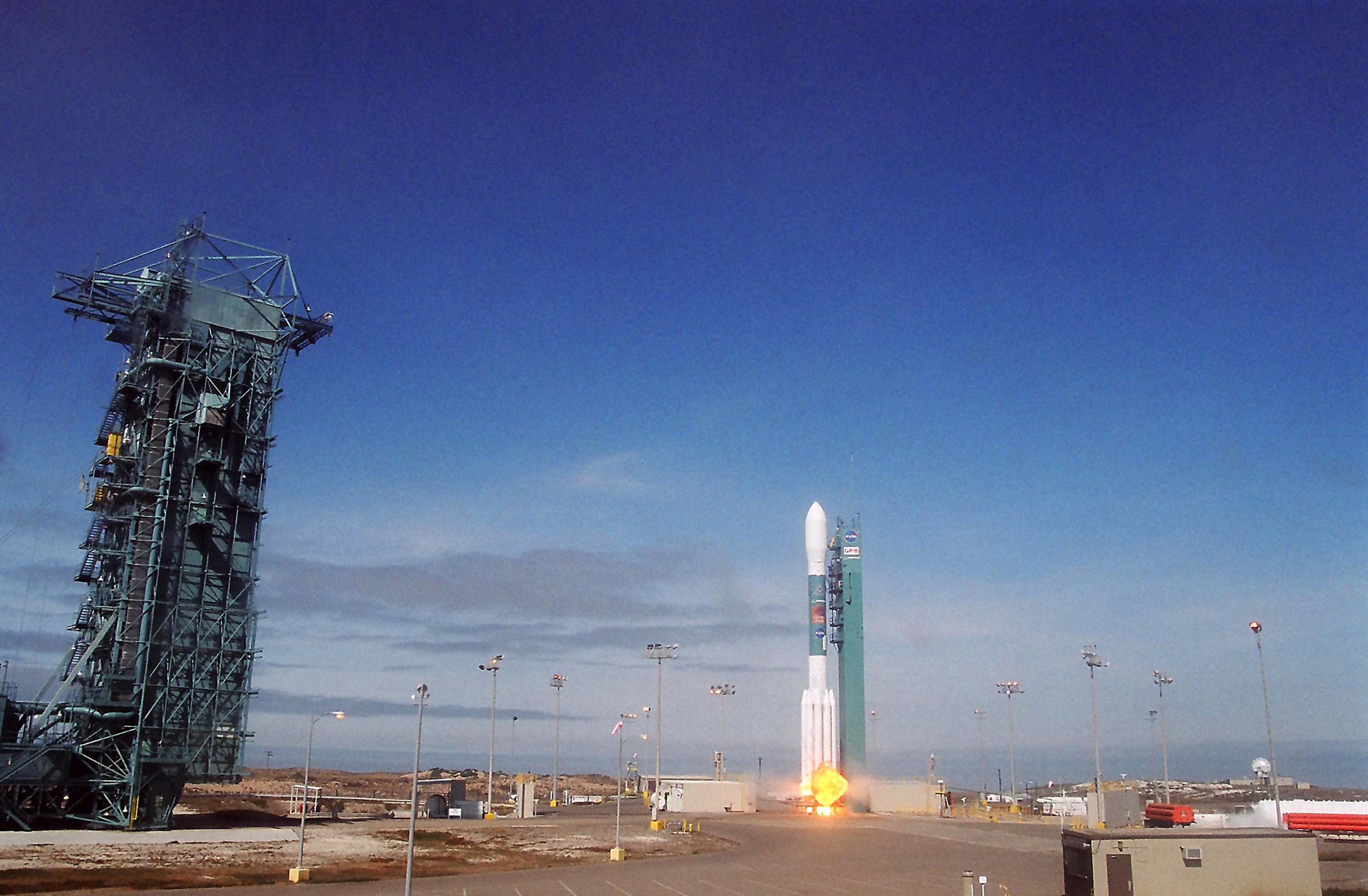
Another view of SLC-2W launching Gravity Probe B

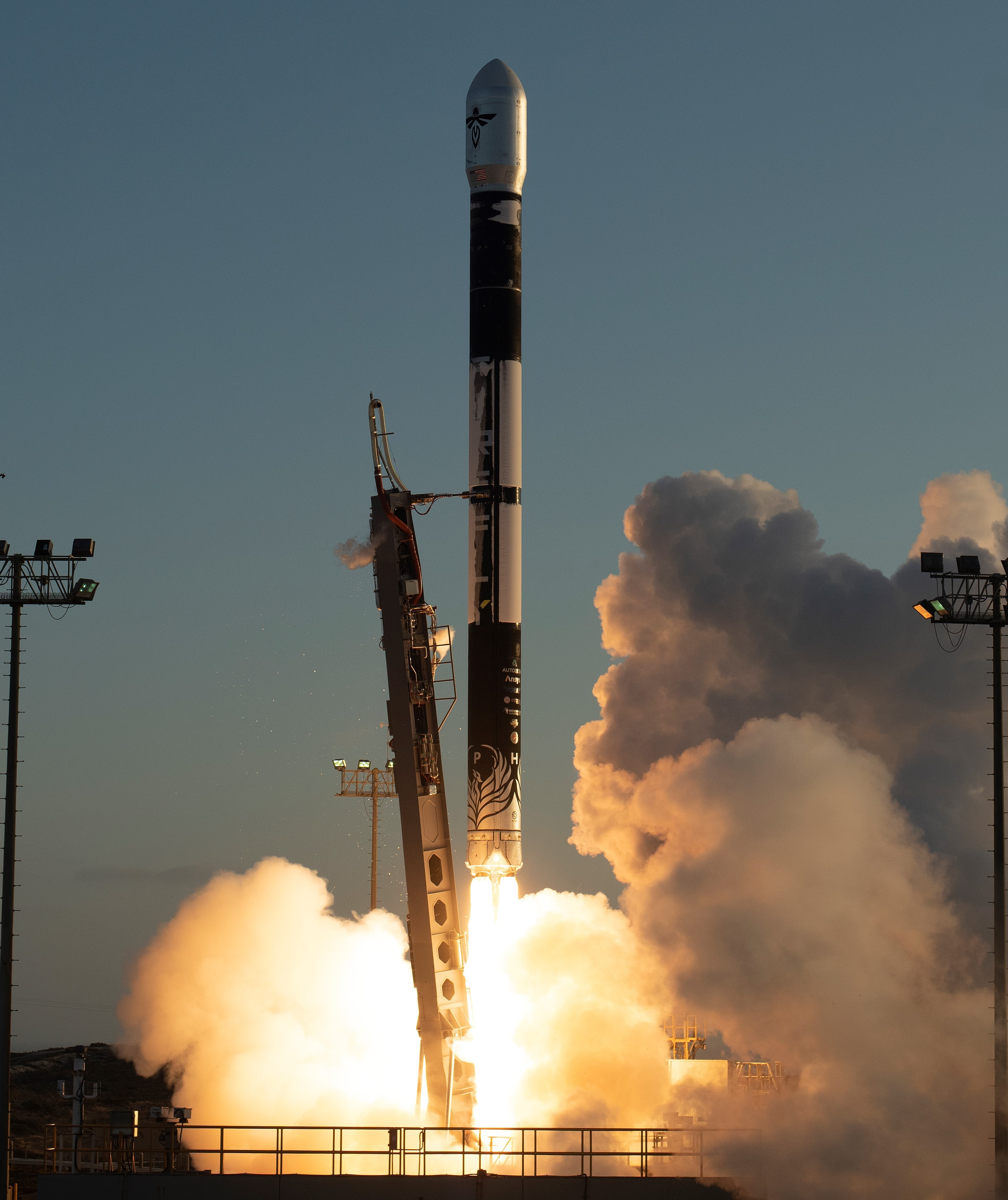
The maiden flight of Firefly Alpha, launching from SLC-2W in 2021

== SLC-2E ==
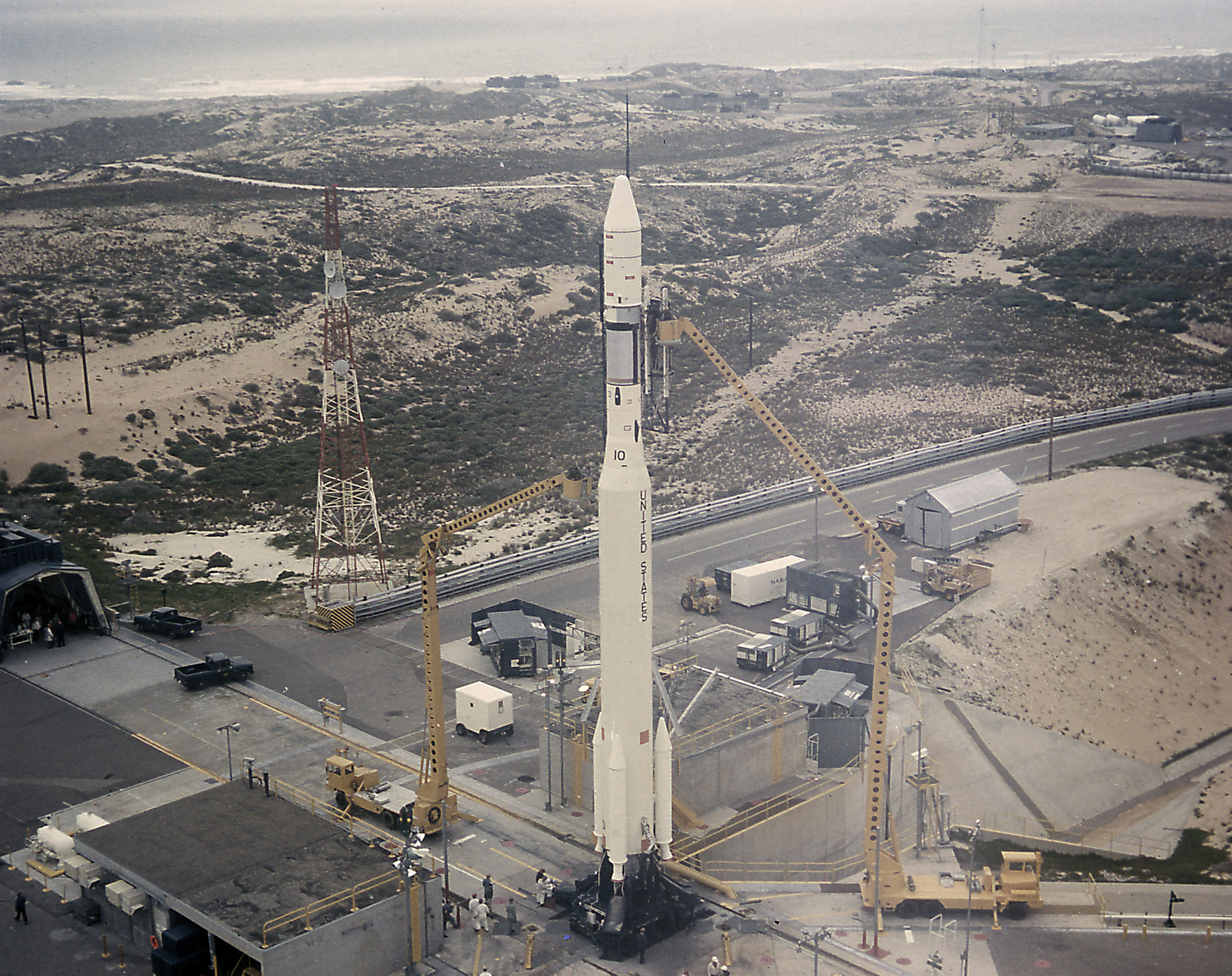
SLC-2E in 1969, holding a Thorad-Agena carrying Nimbus 3

Space Launch Complex 2 East, originally built as Launch Complex 75–1–1, was similar to its western counterpart through its use by the USAF and RAF for Thor missile tests. During this initial period, the pad hosted its first launch on December 18, 1958, and saw three additional flights throughout the next year. Following the retirement of the Thor, LC 75-1-1 got modified in 1960 to launch the Thor-Agena and Thor-Ablestar to increase launch cadence for the military at the base, and each rocket saw 23 and 6 launches from there respectively. Among the most notable launches of that era includes Alouette 1, the first Canadian satellite. In 1966, the pad got renamed to SLC-2E.

As the Thor-Agena and Thor-Ablestar got phased out from use in the late 1960s, SLC-2E likewise saw a gradual conversion for use by the Thor-Delta and Thorad-Agena. During this era, the pad witnessed a total of 19 launches of various government satellites, with fourteen being from the Delta line and five being from the Thorad family. The last launch from SLC-2E came on March 12, 1972, seeing a Delta N propel TD-1A into orbit for ESRO. Much like SLC-1E and 1W, SLC-2E got mothballed to concentrate launches in the area at SLC-2W.

In the years following its deactivation, most structures at SLC-2E have been demolished.

== Launch statistics ==
=== SLC-2W ===
Launch sites at Vandenberg Space Force Base
Active pads
Active pads not used for launches
Inactive leased pads
Inactive unleased pads
1 SLC-1E
2 SLC-1W
3 SLC-2E
4 SLC-2W
5 SLC-10E
6 SLC-10W
7 LC-576E
8 SLC-9
9 SLC-3E
10 SLC-3W
11 SLC-4E
12 SLC-4W (LZ-4)
13 SLC-5
14 SLC-6
15 SLC-8
16 SLC-7
17 SLC-11
18 SLC-12
19 SLC-14
20 SLC-15
- Thor
- Thor-Agena
- Thor-Ablestar
- Delta I
- Delta II
- Firefly Alpha
- Eclipse

==== Thor and derivatives ====
All launches operated by the United States Air Force.

No.	Date	Time (UTC)	Launch vehicle	Configuration	Payload	Result	Remarks
1	17 September 1959	21:09	PGM-17 Thor	Thor DM-18A	Suborbital test	Success	First launch from LC-75-1-2. Test conducted with the Royal Air Force.
2	12 November 1959	19:24	PGM-17 Thor	Thor DM-18A	Suborbital test	Success	Test conducted with the Royal Air Force.
3	15 December 1959	02:14	PGM-17 Thor	Thor DM-18A	Suborbital test	Failure	Test conducted with the Royal Air Force. Flight control failure led to missile breakup 60 seconds after launch.
4	21 January 1960	20:10	PGM-17 Thor	Thor DM-18A	Suborbital test	Success	Test conducted with the Royal Air Force. Final missile test at LC-75.
5	29 August 1962	01:00	Thor-Agena	Thor DM-21 / Agena-D	FTV 1153 (KH-4)	Success	First orbital launch and first Thor-Agena flight from LC-75-1-2.
6	29 September 1962	23:34	Thor-Agena	Thor DM-21 / Agena-D	FTV 1154 (KH-4)	Success	
7	26 October 1962	16:14	Thor-Agena	Thor DM-21 / Agena-D	STARAD	Success	Radiation monitoring satellite, designed to monitor the artificial Van Allen belt created by the nuclear test Starfish Prime.
8	4 December 1962	21:30	Thor-Agena	Thor DM-21 / Agena-D	FTV 1155 (KH-4)	Success	
9	27 June 1963	00:37	Thor-Agena	TAT SLV-2A / Agena-D	OPS-0999 (KH-4)	Success	Carried Hitchhiker 1 as a secondary payload.
10	31 July 1963	00:00	Thor-Agena	TAT SLV-2A / Agena-D	OPS-1370 (KH-4)	Success	
11	23 September 1963	23:00	Thor-Agena	TAT SLV-2A / Agena-D	OPS-1353 (KH-4)	Success	
12	9 November 1963	20:27	Thor-Agena	TAT SLV-2 / Agena-D	OPS-2268 (KH-4)	Failure	Heat shield failure led to high temperatures at thrust sections, leading to eventual control loss 119 seconds after launch.
13	21 December 1963	21:45	Thor-Agena	TAT SLV-2A / Agena-D	OPS-2268 (KH-4)	Success	Carried Hitchhiker 3 as a secondary payload.
14	19 January 1964	10:59	Thor-Agena	TAT SLV-2A / Agena-D	OPS-3367	Success	Two weather satellites, designated OPS-3367A and B.
15	13 June 1964	15:47	Thor-Agena	TAT SLV-2A / Agena-D	OPS-3236 (KH-5)	Success	
16	21 August 1964	15:45	Thor-Agena	TAT SLV-2A / Agena-D	OPS-2739 (KH-5)	Success	
17	6 October 1964	17:04	Thor-Ablestar	Thor DSV-2A / Ablestar	OPS 5796 (Transit O-1)	Success	Part of the Transit Satellite System. First Thor-Ablestar flight from LC-75-1-2.
18	13 December 1964	00:08	Thor-Ablestar	Thor DSV-2A / Ablestar	OPS 6582 (Transit O-2)	Success	Part of the Transit Satellite System. Second and final Thor-Ablestar flight from LC-75-1-2.
19	9 March 1965	18:29	Thor-Agena	TAT SLV-2A / Agena-D	Rideshare payload	Success	Consisted of eight separate satellites, including SOLRAD and POPPY probes.
20	17 July 1965	05:55	Thor-Agena	TAT SLV-2A / Agena-D	OPS-8411 (SAMOS-F)	Success	
21	9 February 1966	19:45	Thor-Agena	TAT SLV-2A / Agena-D	OPS-1439 (SAMOS-F)	Success	
22	29 December 1966	12:00	Thor-Agena	TAT SLV-2A / Agena-D	OPS-1584 (SAMOS-F)	Success	First launch under the name SLC-2W.
23	14 January 1967	21:28	Thor-Agena	TAT SLV-2A / Agena-D	OPS-1664 (KH-4A)	Success	
24	22 February 1967	22:02	Thor-Agena	TAT SLV-2A / Agena-D	OPS-4750 (KH-4A)	Success	
25	30 March 1967	18:54	Thor-Agena	TAT SLV-2A / Agena-D	OPS-4779 (KH-4A)	Success	
26	31 May 1967	09:30	Thor-Agena	Thor DM-21 / Agena-D	Rideshare payload	Success	Consisted of nine separate satellites, including POPPY and Calsphere probes.
27	25 July 1967	03:48	Thor-Agena	TAT SLV-2A / Agena-D	OPS-1879 (SAMOS-F)	Success	
28	17 January 1968	10:12	Thor-Agena	TAT SLV-2A / Agena-D	OPS-1965 (SAMOS-F)	Success	Final flight of the Thor-Agena.

==== Early Delta ====
All launches operated by NASA.

No.	Date	Time (UTC)	Launch vehicle	Configuration	Payload	Result	Remarks
29	21 June 1969	08:53	Delta E1	Thor DSV-2C / Delta-E / FW-4D	Explorer 41	Success	Part of the Explorers Program, aimed at studying the interplanetary magnetic field. First civilian launch from SLC-2W, and first Thor-Delta flight from the pad.
30	23 January 1970	11:52	Delta N6	Thor LTT / Delta-E	TIROS-M	Success	Part of the ITOS series of weather satellites for the ESSA.
31	11 December 1970	11:35	Delta N6	Thor LTT / Delta-E	NOAA-1	Success	Part of the ITOS series of weather satellites for NOAA. Launched as ITOS-A.
32	23 July 1972	18:06	Delta 0100	Thor-Delta 904	Landsat 1	Success	First launch of the Landsat program, aimed at providing research-oriented photographs of Earth. Notable for discovering Landsat Island off the coast of Labrador.
33	15 October 1972	17:17	Delta 0100	Thor-Delta 300	NOAA-2	Success	Part of the ITOS series of weather satellites for NOAA. Launched as ITOS-D.
34	11 December 1972	07:56	Delta 0100	Thor-Delta 900	Nimbus 5	Success	Part of the Nimbus program of meteorlogical satellites.
35	16 July 1973	17:10	Delta 0100	Thor-Delta 300	ITOS-E	Failure	Part of the ITOS series of weather satellites for NOAA. Hydraulic pump malfunction on the second stage led to loss of altitude control system and failure to achieve orbit.
36	6 November 1973	14:02	Delta 0100	Thor-Delta 300	NOAA-3	Success	Part of the ITOS series of weather satellites for NOAA. Launched as ITOS-F.
37	16 December 1973	06:18	Delta 1000	Thor-Delta 1900	Explorer 51	Success	Part of the Explorers Program, aimed at studying the therrmosphere.
38	15 November 1974	17:11	Delta 2000	Thor-Delta 2310	NOAA-4 and Intasat	Success	Part of the ITOS series of weather satellites for NOAA. Launched as ITOS-G. Included Intasat, Spain's first satellite, as a secondary payload.
39	22 January 1975	17:56	Delta 2000	Thor-Delta 2310	Landsat 2	Success	Part of the Landsat program, aimed at providing research-oriented photographs of Earth.
40	10 April 1975	23:50	Delta 1000	Thor-Delta 1410	GEOS-C	Success	
41	12 June 1975	08:12	Delta 2000	Thor-Delta 2910	Nimbus 6	Success	Part of the Nimbus program of meteorlogical satellites.
42	9 August 1975	01:47	Delta 2000	Thor-Delta 2913	COS-B	Success	Space telescope aimed at detecting gamma ray sources. First launch from SLC-2W for the ESRO.
43	6 October 1975	09:01	Delta 2000	Thor-Delta 2910	Explorer 54	Success	Part of the Explorers Program, aimed at studying the structure of Earth's atmosphere.
44	4 May 1976	08:00	Delta 2000	Thor-Delta 2913	LAGEOS-1	Success	
45	29 July 1976	17:07	Delta 2000	Thor-Delta 2310	NOAA-5	Success	Part of the ITOS series of weather satellites for NOAA. Launched as ITOS-H.
46	5 March 1978	17:54	Delta 2000	Thor-Delta 2910	Landsat 3	Success	Part of the Landsat program, aimed at providing research-oriented photographs of Earth.
47	24 October 1978	08:14	Delta 2000	Thor-Delta 2910	Nimbus 7	Success	Part of the Nimbus program of meteorlogical satellites.
48	3 August 1981	09:56	Delta 3000	Thor-Delta 3913	Dynamics Explorer 1 and 2	Success	Two spacecraft. Part of the Explorers Program, designated Explorer 62 and 63, aimed at studying Earth's upper atmosphere. Early shutdown of main engine placed DE-2 into lower than intended orbit.
49	6 October 1981	11:27	Delta 2000	Thor-Delta 2310	Solar Mesosphere Explorer	Success	Part of the Explorers Program, aimed at studying the processes of ozone in the mesosphere.
50	16 July 1982	17:49	Delta 3000	Thor-Delta 3920	Landsat 4	Success	Part of the Landsat program, aimed at providing research-oriented photographs of Earth.
51	23 January 1983	02:17	Delta 3000	Thor-Delta 3910	IRAS	Success	Space telescope aimed at observing infrared light. Partnership between NASA, the NIVR, and SERC. Provided first ever infrared sky survey.
52	26 May 1983	15:18	Delta 3000	Thor-Delta 3914	EXOSAT	Success	Space telescope aimed at detecting x-ray sources. First launch from SLC-2W for ESA.
53	1 March 1984	17:59	Delta 3000	Thor-Delta 3920	Landsat 5	Success	Part of the Landsat program, aimed at providing research-oriented photographs of Earth.
54	18 November 1989	14:34	Delta 5000	Thor-Delta 5290	Cosmic Background Explorer	Success	Part of the Explorers Program, a space telescope aimed at performing an astronomical survey of the cosmic microwave background. Intended to launch from the Space Shuttle, but plans were changed following the Space Shuttle Challenger disaster. Only Delta 5000 flight, and last Delta I launch from SLC-2W.

==== Delta II ====
All launches until July 1997 operated by McDonnell Douglas. All launches from August 1997 to April 2006 operated by Boeing. All launches since December 2006 operated by United Launch Alliance.

No.	Date	Time (UTC)	Launch vehicle	Configuration	Payload	Result	Remarks
55	4 November 1995	14:22	Delta II	Thor-Delta 7920–10	RADARSAT-1	Success	Earth observation satellite for the CSA. First launch of the Delta II from Vandenberg, and first flight from SLC-2W operated by a private company.
56	24 February 1996	11:24	Delta II	Thor-Delta 7925–10	Polar	Success	Part of the International Solar-Terrestrial Physics Science Initiative, aimed at studying aurorae and Earth's magnetic fields at the poles.
57	24 April 1996	12:27	Delta II	Thor-Delta 7920–10	Midcourse Space Experiment	Success	Infrared space telescope aimed at testing missile reconnaissance technology. First military launch from SLC-2W since 1968.
58	5 May 1997	14:55	Delta II	Thor-Delta 7920-10C	Iridium MS-1	Success	First launch of the Iridium satellite constellation.
59	9 July 1997	13:04	Delta II	Thor-Delta 7920-10C	Iridium MS-2	Success	
60	21 August 1997	00:38	Delta II	Thor-Delta 7920-10C	Iridium MS-3	Success	First Delta II launch following the Boeing-McDonnell Douglas merger.
61	27 September 1997	01:23	Delta II	Thor-Delta 7920-10C	Iridium MS-4	Success	
62	9 November 1997	01:34	Delta II	Thor-Delta 7920-10C	Iridium MS-5	Success	
63	20 December 1997	13:16	Delta II	Thor-Delta 7920-10C	Iridium MS-6	Success	
64	18 February 1998	13:58	Delta II	Thor-Delta 7920-10C	Iridium MS-7	Success	
65	30 March 1998	06:02	Delta II	Thor-Delta 7920-10C	Iridium MS-8	Success	
66	17 May 1998	21:16	Delta II	Thor-Delta 7920-10C	Iridium MS-9	Success	
67	8 September 1998	21:13	Delta II	Thor-Delta 7920-10C	Iridium MS-10	Success	
68	6 November 1998	13:37	Delta II	Thor-Delta 7920-10C	Iridium MS-11	Success	
69	23 February 1999	10:29	Delta II	Thor-Delta 7920–10	ARGOS, Ørsted, and SUNSAT	Success	First satellites for Denmark and South Africa with Ørsted and SUNSAT respectively.
70	15 April 1999	18:32	Delta II	Thor-Delta 7920–10	Landsat 7	Success	Part of the Landsat program, aimed at providing research-oriented photographs of Earth.
71	25 March 2000	20:34	Delta II	Thor-Delta 7326–9.5	IMAGE	Success	Part of the Explorers Program, aimed at studying the effects of solar wind on Earth's magnetosphere.
72	21 November 2000	18:24	Delta II	Thor-Delta 7320–10	EO-1	Success	
73	18 October 2001	18:51	Delta II	Thor-Delta 7320–10	QuickBird	Success	
74	7 December 2001	15:07	Delta II	Thor-Delta 7920–10	Jason-1 and TIMED	Success	Part of the Jason satellite series, aimed at studying ocean altimetry. Collaboration between NASA and CNES.
75	11 February 2002	17:43	Delta II	Thor-Delta 7920-10C	Iridium IS-1	Success	
76	4 May 2002	09:54	Delta II	Thor-Delta 7920-10L	Aqua	Success	Part of the Large Strategic Science Missions, aimed at studying the water cycle.
77	13 January 2003	00:45	Delta II	Thor-Delta 7320–10	ICESat and CHIPSat	Success	Part of the Large Strategic Science Missions, aimed at studying ice sheets and sea ice.
78	20 April 2004	16:57	Delta II	Thor-Delta 7920-10C	Gravity Probe B	Success	Aimed at studying general relativity and confirming two predictions it made: frame-dragging and the geodetic effect.
79	15 July 2004	10:02	Delta II	Thor-Delta 7920-10L	Aura	Success	Part of the Large Strategic Science Missions, aimed at studying the ozone layer.
80	20 May 2005	10:22	Delta II	Thor-Delta 7320-10C	NOAA-18	Success	Part of the Advanced TIROS-N series of weather satellites for NOAA. Launched as NOAA-N.
81	28 April 2006	10:02	Delta II	Thor-Delta 7420-10C	CloudSat and CALIPSO	Success	
82	14 December 2006	21:00	Delta II	Thor-Delta 7920–10	NROL-21	Success	Launch for the National Reconnaissance Office, also known as USA-193. First acknowledged flight for the NRO from SLC-2W, and first classified launch from the pad since 1968. First rocket launch operated by United Launch Alliance. Satellite unexpectedly ceased operation early, leading to its destruction by an ASAT during Operation Burnt Frost.
83	8 June 2007	02:34	Delta II	Thor-Delta 7420–10	COSMO-SkyMed 1	Success	
84	18 September 2007	18:35	Delta II	Thor-Delta 7920–10	DigitalGlobe WorldView-1	Success	
85	9 December 2007	02:31	Delta II	Thor-Delta 7420–10	COSMO-2	Success	
86	20 June 2008	07:46	Delta II	Thor-Delta 7320-10C	Jason-2	Success	Part of the Jason satellite series, aimed at studying ocean altimetry. Collaboration between NASA and CNES.
87	6 September 2008	18:50	Delta II	Thor-Delta 7420–10	GeoEye-1	Success	
88	25 October 2008	02:28	Delta II	Thor-Delta 7420-10C	COSMO-3	Success	
89	6 February 2009	10:22	Delta II	Thor-Delta 7320-10C	NOAA-19	Success	Part of the Advanced TIROS-N series of weather satellites for NOAA. Launched as NOAA-N' ("N Prime"). Final TIROS launch.
90	5 May 2009	20:24	Delta II	Thor-Delta 7920-10C	STSS-ATRR	Success	Also known as USA-205. Classified demonstration flight for testing early warning system architecture.
91	8 October 2009	18:51	Delta II	Thor-Delta 7920-10C	WorldView-2	Success	
92	14 December 2009	14:09	Delta II	Thor-Delta 7320-10C	Wide-field Infrared Survey Explorer	Success	Part of the Explorers Program, a space telescope aimed at performing an astronomical survey in infrared. Helped discover numerous comets, asteroids, and brown dwarfs.
93	6 November 2010	02:20	Delta II	Thor-Delta 7420-10C	COSMO-4	Success	
94	10 June 2011	14:20	Delta II	Thor-Delta 7320-10C	SAC-D	Success	
95	28 October 2011	09:48	Delta II	Thor-Delta 7920-10C	Suomi NPP	Success	First launch of the Joint Polar Satellite System, aimed at providing environmental data used in numerical weather prediction.
96	2 July 2014	09:56	Delta II	Thor-Delta 7320-10C	Orbiting Carbon Observatory 2	Success	Satellite aimed at measuring carbon dioxide composition in Earth's atmosphere. Was built to follow up on the failed launch of the first Orbiting Carbon Observatory in 2009. First Delta II launch following vehicle's retirement from Cape Canaveral.
97	31 January 2015	14:22	Delta II	Thor-Delta 7320-10C	SMAP	Success	
98	18 November 2017	09:47	Delta II	Thor-Delta 7920-10C	NOAA-20	Success	Part of the Joint Polar Satellite System, aimed at providing environmental data used in numerical weather prediction.
99	15 September 2018	13:02	Delta II	Thor-Delta 7420-10C	ICESat-2	Success	Successor to ICESat, aimed at studying ice sheets and sea ice. Final flight of the Delta II, and final flight of a Thor-derived launch vehicle.

==== Alpha ====
All launches operated by Firefly Aerospace.

No.	Date	Time (UTC)	Launch vehicle	Mission name	Payload	Result	Remarks
100	3 September 2021	01:59	Firefly Alpha	"DREAM"	Rideshare payload	Failure	Maiden flight of Firefly Alpha and first orbital launch conducted by Firefly Aerospace. Engine failure 15 seconds into flight led to loss of control at transonic speed, activating range safety protocols 2 minutes 30 seconds after launch.
101	1 October 2022	07:01	Firefly Alpha	"To the Black"	TechEdSat-15 and other payloads	Partial failure	First successful orbit insertion by Firefly and Alpha. Payloads deployed in lower than intended orbit, leading to reentry a week after launch.
102	15 September 2023	02:28	Firefly Alpha	"VICTUS NOX"	VICTUS NOX	Success	First fully successful Alpha launch.
103	22 December 2023	17:32	Firefly Alpha	"Fly the Lightning"	Tantrum	Partial failure	Issue with second stage relight placed payload in lower than intended orbit, noticeably reducing time before decay.
104	4 July 2024	04:04	Firefly Alpha	"Noise of Summer"	VCLS Demo-2FB	Success	
105	29 April 2025	13:37	Firefly Alpha	"Message in a Booster"	LM-400 Demo	Failure	Mishap during stage separation led to loss of second stage engine bell, greatly reducing thrust and failure to make orbit.
106	12 March 2026	00:50	Firefly Alpha	"Stairway To Seven"	Test payload	Success	

=== SLC-2E ===
- Thor
- Thor-Agena
- Thor-Ablestar
- Delta I
- Thorad-Agena

All Thor and derivative launches operated by the United States Air Force. All Delta and Thorad launches operated by NASA.

No.	Date	Time (UTC)	Launch vehicle	Configuration	Payload	Result	Remarks
1	16 December 1958	23:44	PGM-17 Thor	Thor DM-18A	Suborbital test	Success	First launch from LC-75-1-1 and first Thor launch from Vandenberg. Test conducted with the Royal Air Force.
2	3 August 1959	21:41	PGM-17 Thor	Thor DM-18A	Suborbital test	Success	Test conducted with the Royal Air Force.
3	21 October 1959	22:57	PGM-17 Thor	Thor DM-18A	Suborbital test	Success	Test conducted with the Royal Air Force.
4	2 December 1959	05:29	PGM-17 Thor	Thor DM-18A	Suborbital test	Failure	Test conducted with the Royal Air Force. Final missile test from LC-75-1-1.
5	16 June 1961	23:02	Thor-Agena	Thor DM-21 / Agena-B	Discoverer 25 (KH-2)	Success	First orbital launch from LC-75-1, and first Thor-Agena flight from LC-75-1-1.
6	4 August 1961	00:01	Thor-Agena	Thor DM-21 / Agena-B	Discoverer 28 (KH-2)	Failure	Failure in Agena hydraulic pressure led to loss of control and failure to achieve orbit.
7	17 September 1961	21:00	Thor-Agena	Thor DM-21 / Agena-B	Discoverer 31 (KH-3)	Success	
8	5 November 1961	20:00	Thor-Agena	Thor DM-21 / Agena-B	Discoverer 34 (KH-3)	Failure	Failure with guidance program left payload in useless orbit.
9	30 May 1962	01:00	Thor-Agena	Thor DM-21 / Agena-B	FTV 1128 (KH-4)	Success	
10	28 June 1962	01:09	Thor-Agena	Thor DM-21 / Agena-D	FTV 1151 (KH-4)	Success	
11	2 August 1962	00:17	Thor-Agena	Thor DM-21 / Agena-D	FTV 1152 (KH-4)	Success	
12	29 September 1962	06:05	Thor-Agena	Thor DM-21 / Agena-B	Alouette 1	Success	Satellite aimed at studying Earth's ionosphere. First satellite for Canada. First civilian launch from LC-75-1.
13	13 December 1962	04:07	Thor-Agena	Thor DM-21 / Agena-D	Rideshare payload	Success	Consisted of five separate satellites, including Calsphere and Injun probes.
14	7 January 1963	21:09	Thor-Agena	Thor DM-21 / Agena-D	OPS-0048 (KH-4)	Success	
15	26 April 1963	20:13	Thor-Agena	Thor DM-21 / Agena-D	OPS-1008 (KH-5)	Failure	Error in altitude adjustment sensor resulted in failure to achieve orbit.
16	15 June 1963	14:29	Thor-Agena	Thor DM-21 / Agena-D	Rideshare payload	Success	Consisted of five separate satellites, including SOLRAD and Surcal probes.
17	19 July 1963	00:00	Thor-Agena	Thor DM-21 / Agena-D	OPS-1266 (KH-4)	Success	
18	28 September 1963	20:22	Thor-Ablestar	Thor DSV-2A / Ablestar	Transit 5E-1 and 5BN-1	Success	Part of the Transit Satellite System. First of three launches of a Transit satellite carrying an RTG. First Thor-Ablestar flight from Vandenberg and from LC-75-1-1.
19	5 December 1963	21:51	Thor-Ablestar	Thor DSV-2A / Ablestar	Transit 5E-3 and 5BN-2	Success	Part of the Transit Satellite System. Second of three launches of a Transit satellite carrying an RTG.
20	25 January 1964	13:59	Thor-Agena	TAT SLV-2 / Agena-B	Echo 2	Success	Part of Project Echo, being a balloon satellite used for passive communication.
21	21 April 1964	18:50	Thor-Ablestar	Thor DSV-2A / Ablestar	Transit 5E-4 and 5BN-3	Failure	Part of the Transit Satellite System. Last of three launches of a Transit satellite carrying an RTG. Failure of launch led to decision for future Transit sats solely relying on solar panels.
22	19 June 1964	23:18	Thor-Agena	TAT SLV-2A / Agena-D	OPS-3754 (KH-4A)	Success	
23	28 August 1964	07:56	Thor-Agena	TAT SLV-2 / Agena-B	Nimbus 1	Partial failure	First launch of the Nimbus program of meteorlogical satellites. Shorter second stage burn placed payload in more eccentric than expected orbit.
24	18 November 1964	20:35	Thor-Agena	TAT SLV-2A / Agena-D	OPS-3360 (KH-4A)	Success	
25	21 December 1964	19:08	Thor-Agena	TAT SLV-2A / Agena-D	OPS-3762 (Quill)	Success	Only launch of a Quill satellite. First spacecraft to use radar imaging.
26	11 March 1965	13:39	Thor-Ablestar	Thor DSV-2A / Ablestar	OPS 7087 (Transit O-3)	Success	Part of the Transit Satellite System.
27	24 June 1965	22:35	Thor-Ablestar	Thor DSV-2A / Ablestar	OPS 8480 (Transit O-4)	Success	Part of the Transit Satellite System.
28	13 August 1965	22:11	Thor-Ablestar	Thor DSV-2A / Ablestar	OPS 8464 (Transit O-5)	Success	Part of the Transit Satellite System. Contained other secondary payloads, such as Calsphere and Surcal probes. Final flight of the Thor-Ablestar.
29	14 October 1965	13:11	Thor-Agena	TAT SLV-2A / Agena-D	OGO-2	Success	Part of the Orbiting Geophysical Observatory program, aimed at studying Earth's magnetosphere.
30	29 November 1965	04:48	Thor-Agena	Thor DM-21 / Agena-B	Alouette 2 and Explorer 31	Success	Two satellites, both aimed at studying the ionosphere. Alouette 2 operated by the CSA, and Explorer 31 was part of the Explorers Program,
31	15 May 1966	07:55	Thor-Agena	TAT SLV-2A / Agena-B	Nimbus 2	Success	Part of the Nimbus program of meteorlogical satellites.
32	24 June 1966	00:12	Thor-Agena	TAT SLV-2A / Agena-D	PAGEOS-1	Success	
33	2 October 1966	10:34	Delta E	Thor DSV-2C / Delta-E / Altair-2	ESSA-3	Success	Part of the TOS series of weather satellites for the ESSA. First Thor-Delta flight from Vandenberg, and first launch as SLC-2E.
34	26 January 1967	17:31	Delta E	Thor DSV-2C / Delta-E / Altair-2	ESSA-4	Success	Part of the TOS series of weather satellites for the ESSA.
35	20 April 1967	11:17	Delta E	Thor DSV-2C / Delta-E / Altair-2	ESSA-5	Success	Part of the TOS series of weather satellites for the ESSA.
36	24 May 1967	14:06	Delta E1	Thor DSV-2C / Delta-E / FW-4D	Explorer 34	Success	Part of the Explorers Program, aimed at studying the interplanetary magnetic field.
37	28 July 1967	14:21	Thor-Agena	TAT SLV-2A / Agena-D	OGO-4	Success	Part of the Orbiting Geophysical Observatory program, aimed at studying Earth's magnetosphere.
38	10 November 1967	18:00	Delta E1	Thor DSV-2C / Delta-E / FW-4D	ESSA-6	Success	Part of the TOS series of weather satellites for the ESSA.
39	11 January 1968	16:19	Delta E1	Thor DSV-2C / Delta-E / FW-4D	Explorer 36	Success	Part of the Explorers Program, aimed at studying geodesy from orbit.
40	18 May 1968	08:23	Thorad-Agena	SLV-2G / Agena-D	Nimbus B	Failure	Part of the Nimbus program of meteorlogical satellites. First Thorad-Agena launch from SLC-2E. Incorrectly installed gyro for yaw led to loss of control 101 seconds into flight, activating range safety.
41	4 July 1968	17:31	Delta J	Thor DSV-2C / Delta-E / Star 37D	Explorer 38	Success	Part of the Explorers Program, aimed at studying radio astronomy from orbit.
42	16 August 1968	11:31	Delta N	Thor LTT / Delta-E	ESSA-7	Success	Part of the TOS series of weather satellites for the ESSA. Maiden flight of the Long Tank Thor design for Delta.
43	15 December 1968	17:17	Delta N	Thor LTT / Delta-E	ESSA-8	Success	Part of the TOS series of weather satellites for the ESSA.
44	30 January 1969	06:43	Delta E1	Thor DSV-2C / Delta-E / FW-4D	ISIS 1	Success	
45	14 April 1969	07:54	Thorad-Agena	Thorad SLV-2G / Agena-D	Nimbus 3	Success	Part of the Nimbus program of meteorlogical satellites.
46	5 June 1969	14:42	Thorad-Agena	Thorad SLV-2H / Agena-D	OGO-6	Success	Part of the Orbiting Geophysical Observatory program, aimed at studying Earth's magnetosphere.
47	4 February 1970	02:59	Thorad-Agena	Thorad SLV-2G / Agena-D	SERT 2	Success	
48	8 April 1970	08:17	Thorad-Agena	Thorad SLV-2G / Agena-D	Nimbus 4	Success	Part of the Nimbus program of meteorlogical satellites. Final Thorad-Agena flight from SLC-2.
49	1 April 1971	02:53	Delta E1	Thor DSV-2C / Delta E / FW-4D	ISIS 2	Success	
50	21 October 1971	11:32	Delta N6	Thor LTT / Delta-E	ITOS-B	Failure	Part of the ITOS series of weather satellites for NOAA. Oxidizer leak in second stage led to altitude control system running out of propellant trying to compensate, resulting in failure to achieve orbit.
51	31 January 1972	17:20	Delta L	Thor LTT / Delta-E / FW-1D	HEOS 2	Success	
52	12 March 1972	00:00	Delta N	Thor LTT / Delta-E	TD-1A	Success	Final Delta launch from SLC-2E. Most recent launch conducted from SLC-2E.

== See also ==
- Space Launch Complex 3E
- Space Launch Complex 4E
- Space Launch Complex 6
