= Nimbus 5 =

Former U.S. meteorological satellite

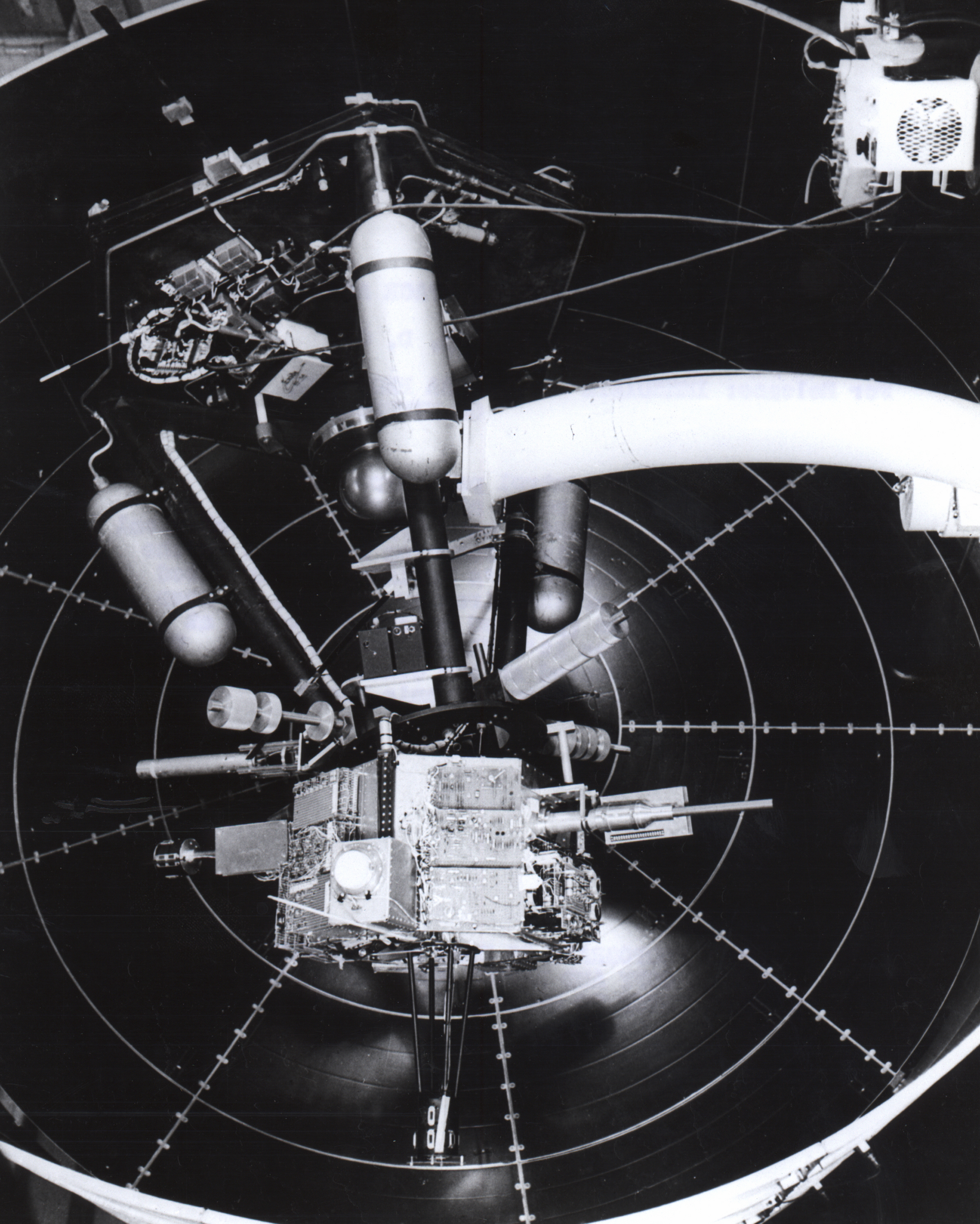
- Mission type: Weather satellite
- COSPAR ID: 1972-097A
- SATCAT no.: 06305

Spacecraft properties
- Manufacturer: RCA Astrospace
- Launch mass: 770.0 kg (1,697.6 lb)
- Dimensions: 3.7 metres (12 ft) tall x 1.5 metres (4 ft 11 in) dia.

Start of mission
- Launch date: December 11, 1972 07:56:00 UTC
- Rocket: Delta-900 577/D93
- Launch site: Vandenberg SLC-2W

End of mission
- Last contact: March 29, 1983

Orbital parameters
- Reference system: Geocentric
- Regime: Low Earth
- Eccentricity: 0.0008
- Perigee altitude: 1,089 kilometers (677 mi)
- Apogee altitude: 1,101 kilometers (684 mi)
- Inclination: 99°
- Period: 107.2 minutes

Nimbus 5 (also called Nimbus E or Nimbus V) was a meteorological satellite for the research and development of sensing technology. It was the fifth successful launch in a series of the Nimbus program.

The objective of Nimbus 5 was to test and evaluate advanced sensing technology, and to provide improved photographs of cloud formations.

== Launch ==
Nimbus 5 was launched on December 11, 1972, by a Delta rocket from Vandenberg Air Force Base in California. The satellite orbited the Earth once every 107 minutes, at an inclination of 99°. Its perigee was 1,089 kilometers (677 mi) and its apogee was 1,101 kilometers (684 mi).

== Instruments ==
There were six science instruments aboard Nimbus 5. The satellite also included Sun sensors, and horizon scanners for navigation.

=== Infrared Temperature Profile Radiometer (ITPR) ===
The ITPR was designed to obtain vertical profiles of temperature and moisture in the atmosphere. A 3-dimensional map could then be created with a resolution of 32 km.

=== Selective Chopper Radiometer (SCR) ===
The SCR had three objectives: to observe the global atmospheric temperature structure, to observe the distribution of water vapor, and to measure the density of ice crystals in cirrus clouds. Its sensing resolution was about 25 km.

=== Nimbus E Microwave Spectrometer (NEMS) ===
NEMS was used to demonstrate the use of microwave sensors for measuring tropospheric temperature profiles, water content in clouds, and surface temperature. The instrument monitored five selected frequencies continuously. The data were recorded on a magnetic tape so they could be transmitted later.

=== Electrically Scanning Microwave Radiometer (ESMR) ===
ESMR was used for mapping the microwave radiation from Earth's surface. This information was used to measure the water content of clouds, and to observe sea ice. It was also used to test the use of microwaves to measure soil moisture. The antenna system was deployed after launch, and controlled by an onboard computer.

=== Surface Composition Mapping Radiometer (SCMR) ===
For measuring the thermal emission characteristics of Earth's surface and sea temperatures. A scanning mirror rotated ten times per second to sense sections 800 km wide. SCMR malfunctioned soon after launch.

=== Temperature/Humidity Infrared Radiometer (THIR) ===
THIR was used for measuring cloud top temperatures and water vapor content in the stratosphere. It could measure cloud temperatures in the day and at night. The sensing unit was a bolometer made from germanium.
