= Samos-F =

Series of SIGINT reconnaissance satellites

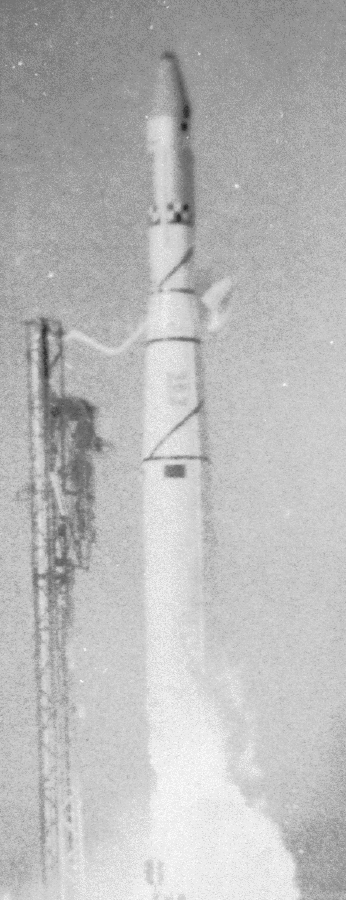
Launch of SAMOS F2-3 (Ferret 2) on 1963-01-16

SAMOS-F or Air Force Program 102 refers to a series of SIGINT reconnaissance satellites launched and operated by the United States Air Force and National Reconnaissance Office during the 1960s. Initial priorities (in decreasing order) were to monitor radio waves in the frequency bands 2.5-3.2 GHz (S band), 9.0–10 GHz (X band), and 59-650 MHz. The intercepted data and their location were stored on magnetic tape, and subsequently transmitted to tracking and acquisition ground stations. Tracking stations were located in the NE (New Boston, New Hampshire), Central (Ottumwa, Iowa), and NW (Fort Stevens (Oregon)) of the continental United States, with additional test sites at Vandenberg AFB, California, and at Ka'ena Point, Oahu, Hawai. The satellites are also called Agena ferrets and heavy ferrets. Approximately sixteen heavy ferrets were launched into low Earth orbits from Vandenberg Air Force Base between February 1962 and July 1971 aboard Thor-Agena and Thorad-Agena rockets. Almost everything about these satellites remains classified.

== Launch list ==
| Name | Alt name | Launch date | Launch vehicle | ID | Mass (kg) | Decay date | Perigee (km) | Apogee (km) | Inclination (°) |
|---|---|---|---|---|---|---|---|---|---|
| SAMOS F2-1 | 1962 Delta 1 | 1962-02-21 | Thor | 1962-004A | 1000 | 1962-03-09 | 169 | 220 | 81.9° |
| SAMOS F2-2 | 1962 Omega 1 | 1962-06-18 | Thor-Agena | 1962-024A | 1500 | 1963-10-30 | 370 | 394 | 82.1° |
| SAMOS F2-3 | OPS-0180, Ferret 2 | 1963-01-16 | Thor Augmented Delta-Agena D | 1963-003A | 1100 | 1969-01-09 | 459 | 533 | 81.8° |
| SAMOS F2-4 | OPS-1440, Ferret 3 | 1963-06-29 | Thor-Agena | 1963-027A | 1500 | 1969-10-26 | 485 | 521 | 82.3° |
| SAMOS F3-1 | OPS-3722, Ferret 4 | 1964-02-28 | Thor Augmented Delta-Agena D | 1964-011A | 1500 | 1969-02-19 | 493 | 509 | 82,0° |
| SAMOS F3-2 | OPS-3395 | 1964-07-02 | Thor Augmented Delta-Agena D | 1964-035A | 1500 | 1969-08-07 | 494 | 530 | 82,0° |
| SAMOS F3-3 | OPS-3062, Ferret 6 | 1964-11-04 | Thor Augmented Delta-Agena D | 1964-072A | 1500 | 1969-11-05 | 507 | 526 | 82,0° |
| SAMOS F3-4 | OPS-8411, Ferret 7 | 1965-07-17 | Thor Augmented Delta-Agena D | 1965-055A | 1500 | 1968-12-18 | 469 | 511 | 70.1° |
| SAMOS F3-5 | OPS-1439, Ferret 8 | 1966-02-09 | Thor | 1966-009A | 1500 | 1969-09-26 | 499 | 504 | 82,0° |
| SAMOS F3-6 | OPS-1584, Ferret 9 | 1966-12-29 | Thor | 1966-118A | 1500 | 1969-04-05 | 484 | 492 | 75,0° |
| SAMOS F3-7 | OPS-1879, Ferret 10 | 1967-07-25 | Thor | 1967-071A | 1500 | 1969-06-05 | 454 | 512 | 75,0° |
| SAMOS F3-8 | OPS-1965, Ferret 11 | 1968-01-17 | Thor | 1968-004A | 1500 | 1970-07-07 | 455 | 534 | 75.1° |
| SAMOS F3-9 | OPS-0964, Ferret 12 | 1968-10-05 | Thor | 1968-086A | 2000 | 1971-03-26 | 481 | 506 | 75,0° |
| SAMOS F3-10 | OPS-8285, Ferret 13 | 1969-07-31 | Thor | 1969-065A | 1500 | 1973-01-04 | 459 | 538 | 75,0° |
| SAMOS F3-11 | OPS-8329, Ferret 14 | 1970-08-26 | Thor | 1970-066A | 2000 | 1975-03-26 | 482 | 500 | 74.9° |
| SAMOS F3-12 | OPS-8373 | 1971-07-16 | Thor | 1971-060A | 2000 | 1978-08-31 | 486 | 505 | 75,0° |
