= Delta N =

American expendable launch vehicle

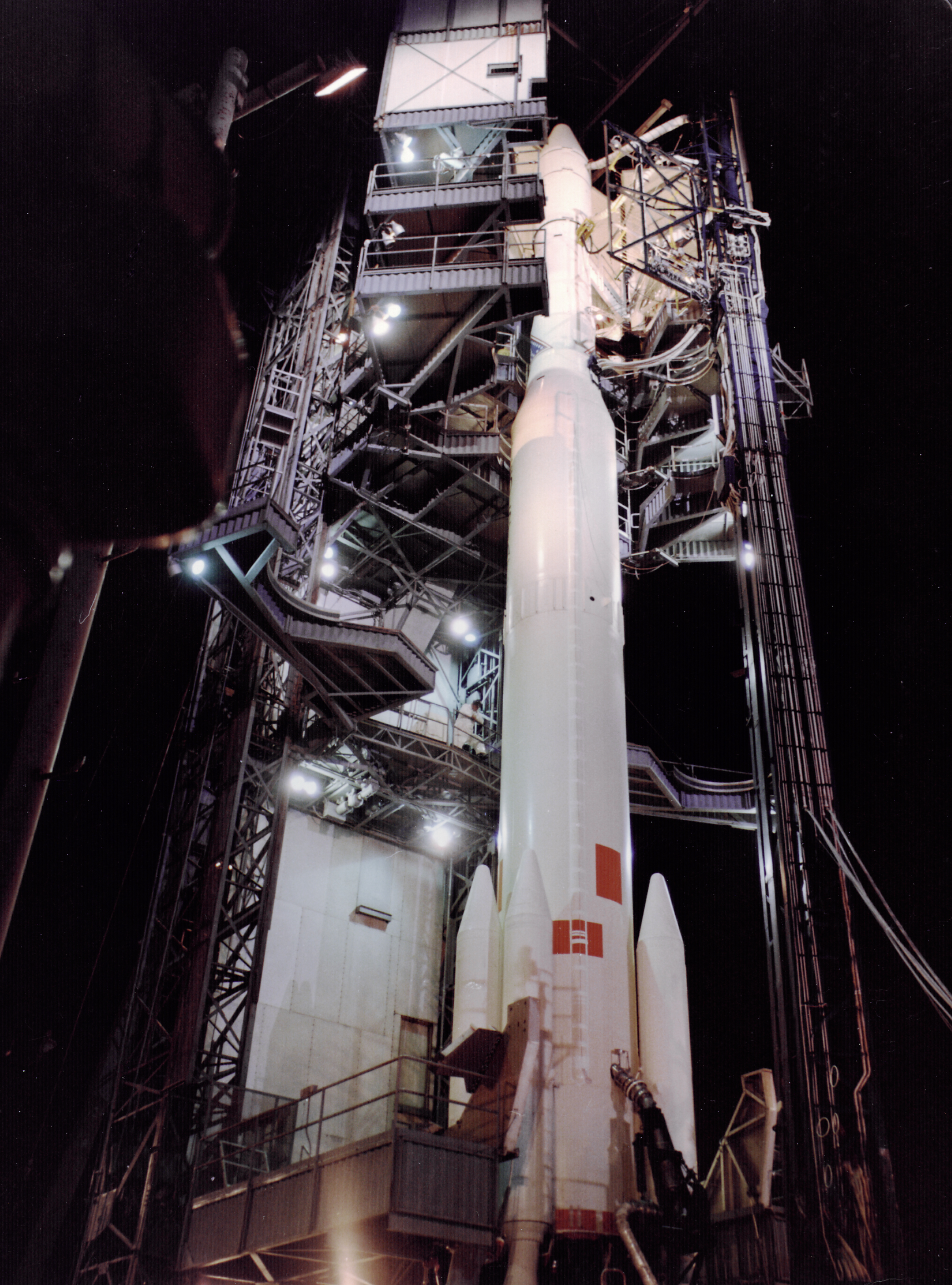
- Delta N6 prior to the launch of ITOS B
- Function: Expendable launch system
- Country of origin: United States

Launch history
- Status: Retired
- Launch sites: Cape Canaveral LC-17A; Vandenberg SLC-2
- Total launches: 9
- Success(es): 8
- Failure: 1
- First flight: 18 September 1968
- Last flight: 12 March 1972

The Delta N or Thor-Delta N was an American expendable launch system used for nine orbital launches between 1968 and 1972. It was a member of the Delta family of rockets, and the last Delta to be given an alphabetical designation - subsequent rockets were designated using a four digit numerical code.

The Delta N consisted of two stages. The first stage was the Long Tank Thor, a stretched version of the Thor missile, previously flown on the Delta L and Delta M. Three Castor-2 solid rocket boosters were attached to increase thrust at lift-off. A Delta E was used as the second stage. If an increased payload capacity was required, six boosters were flown instead of three, in a configuration known as the Delta N6, or "Super Six". Three launches used the N6 configuration.

Delta N rockets were launched from Launch Complex 17A at the Cape Canaveral Air Force Station, and SLC-2 at Vandenberg AFB. There was one failure, the launch of ITOS E on October 21, 1971. The Delta second stage developed an oxidizer leak about 40 seconds into launch so that when its burn began, the engine quickly lost thrust. In addition, the leaking LOX started pushing the stage off its proper flight path. The guidance system tried to compensate by repeatedly firing the attitude control jets, but this resulted in the rapid exhaustion of their propellant and the launch vehicle started tumbling uncontrollably. The ITOS satellite separated on schedule, but was facing in the wrong direction for orbital insertion, so it simply reentered the atmosphere and burned up. The second stage itself and several pieces of debris did manage to reach orbit and remained there for several weeks.
