= Delta 0100 =

American expendable launch system

Delta 0100 series
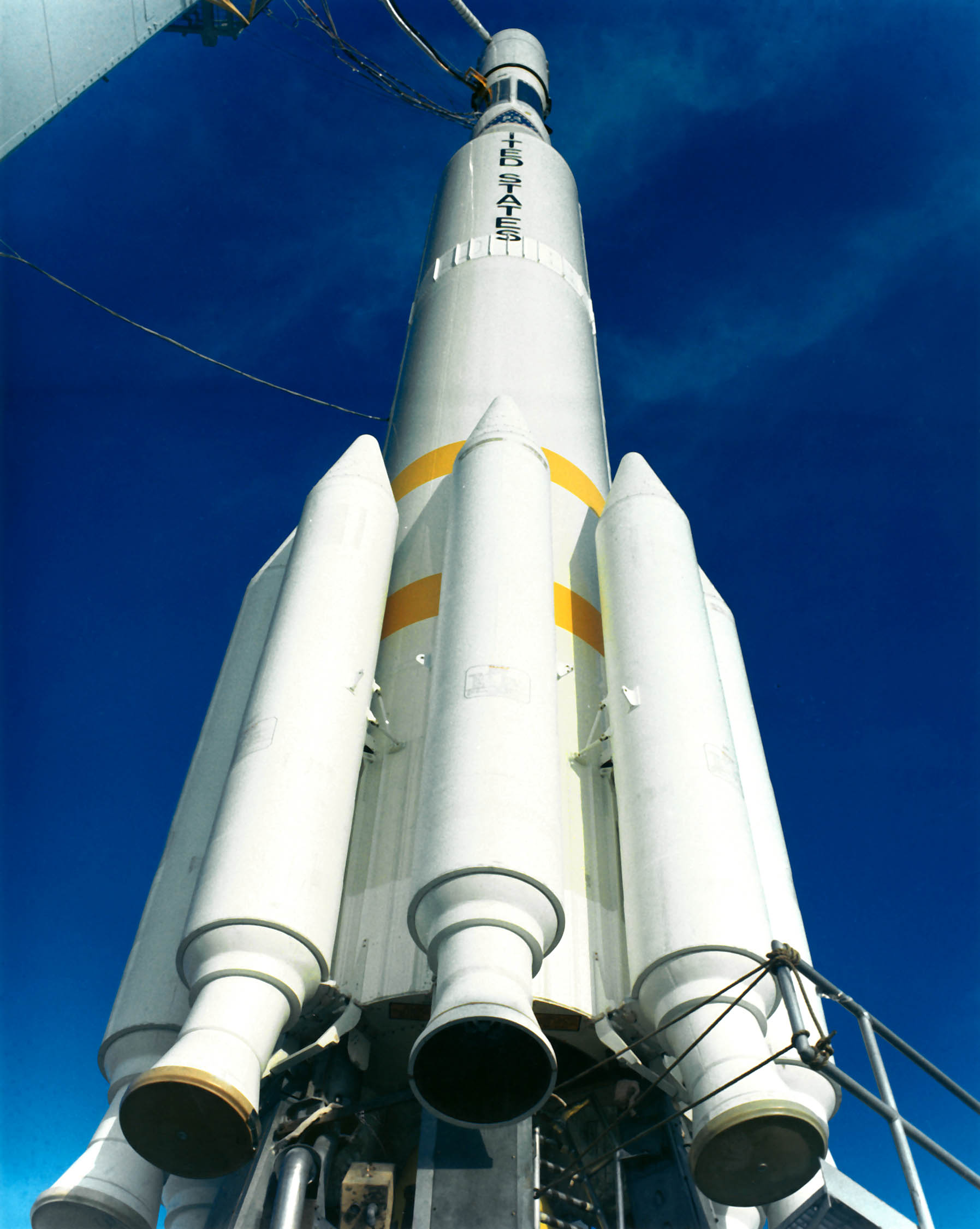
- Delta 0900 prior to the launch of Nimbus 5.
- Function: Expendable launch system
- Country of origin: United States

Size
- Stages: Long Tank Thor; Delta F; Castor 2 (3, 9)

Launch history
- Status: Retired
- Launch sites: Vandenberg SLC-2W
- Total launches: 5
- Success(es): 4
- Failure: 1
- First flight: 23 July 1972
- Last flight: 6 November 1973

The Delta 0100 series, also Delta 100, 0300 or 300 series, was an American expendable launch system which conducted orbital launches between 1968 and 1972. It was a member of the Delta family of rockets, and the first to be designated using a four digit numerical code. Two variants were flown, individually designated Delta 0300 and Delta 0900.

The Long Tank Thor, a stretched version of the Thor missile, was used as the first stage of the Delta 0100 series. Castor-2 solid rocket boosters were attached to increase thrust at lift-off, three on the 0300 variant, and nine on the 0900. The second stage was a Delta F.

Five 0100 series rockets were launched, three using the 0300 configuration, and two in the 0900 configuration. All launches occurred from Space Launch Complex 2W at Vandenberg AFB. There was one failure, the launch of ITOS E on July 16, 1973. A hydraulic pump malfunction led to loss of pressure to the second stage attitude control thrusters, causing the launch vehicle to tumble out of control and break up in the atmosphere.

The Japanese N-I launch vehicle was derived from the Delta 0300, using a Japanese LE-3 engine on the second stage.

== Capabilities ==
Capacity of the Delta 0100:

- Sun-synchronous orbit (SSO), 1450 km × 101.990°: at least 309 kg (681 lb).
