= Essa =

Essa or ESSA may refer to:

== Places ==
- Essa, Ontario, Canada
- Saltash (Cornish: Essa), a town and civil parish in Cornwall, England, UK
- Essa Academy, Bolton, England, UK
- Stockholm Arlanda Airport (ICAO code)

== People ==
=== Given name ===
- Essa (rapper) or Yungun, British rapper
- Essa Al-Zenkawi (born 1992), Kuwaiti–Hungarian discus thrower
- Essa M. Faal, Gambian lawyer at the International Criminal Court
- Essa Obaid (bodybuilder) (born 1979), Emirati bodybuilder
- Essa Obaid (footballer) (born 1984), Emirati football player
- Essa Rios, José Delgado Saldaña (born 1978), Mexican professional wrestler

=== Surname ===
- Irfan Essa, Pakistani-American computer engineering academic
- Michael Essa, American drifter and racing driver
- Muhammad Essa (born 1983), Pakistani football player and coach
- Qazi Muhammad Essa (1914–1976), Pakistani politician
- Salim Essa, South African businessman

== Acronyms ==
- Economic Society of South Africa
- Environmental Science Services Administration, precursor of the US National Oceanic and Atmospheric Administration
- European Social Simulation Association
- Every Student Succeeds Act, a 2015 American law
- Emotional Support Stuffed Animal, a stuffed toy used as a comfort object

== See also ==
- ESSA-1, satellite
- ESSA-2, satellite
- ESSA-3, satellite
- ESSA-4, satellite
- ESSA-5, satellite
- ESSA-6, satellite
- ESSA-7, satellite
- ESSA-8, satellite
- ESSA-9, satellite
