= ESSA-I =

ESSA-I may refer to:

- ESSA-1, the first ESSA satellite
- ESSA-9, the ninth ESSA satellite
