= ESSA-8 =

Former American weather satellite

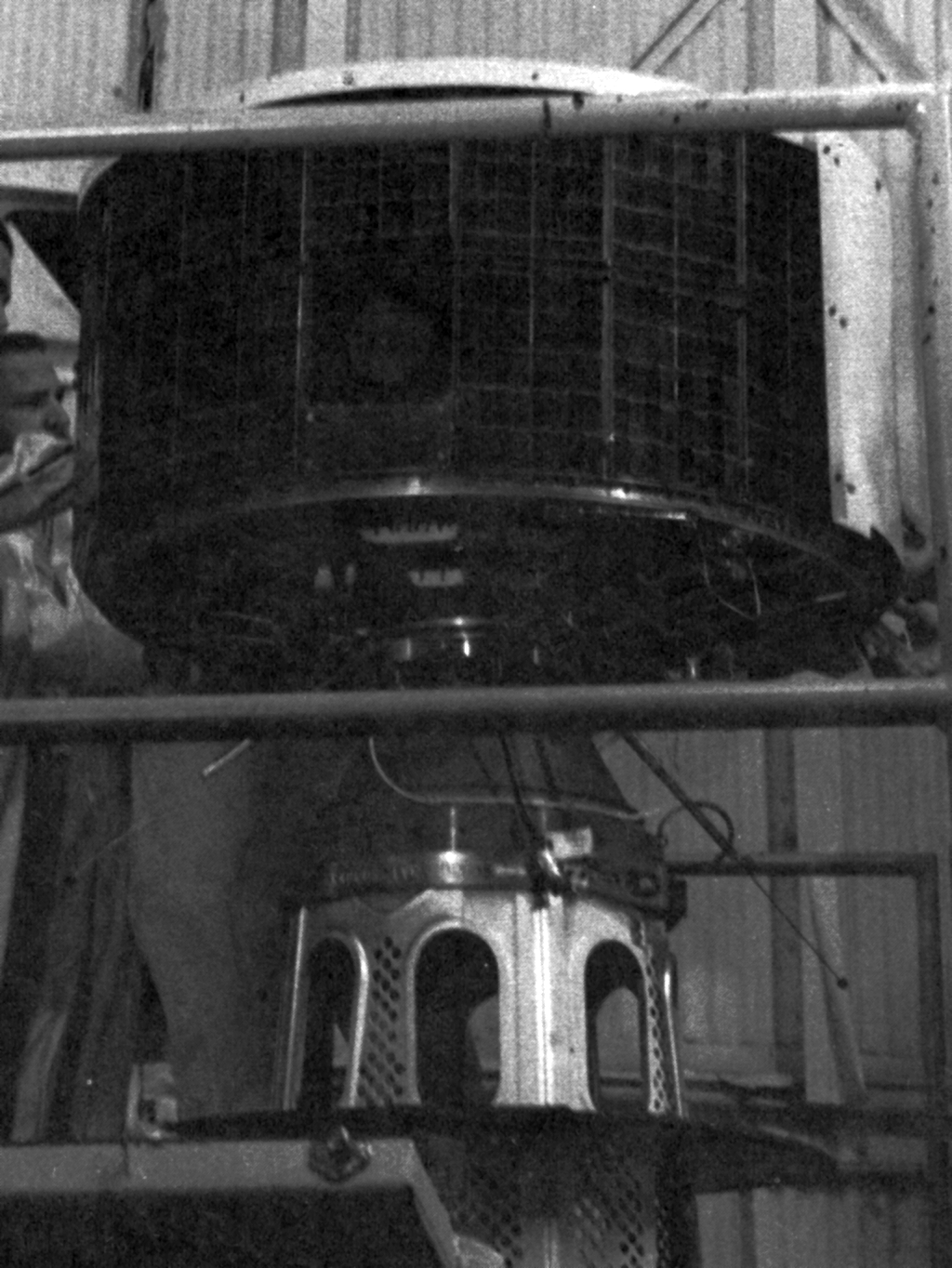
- Mission type: Weather satellite
- Operator: ESSA/NASA
- COSPAR ID: 1968-114A
- SATCAT no.: 3615

Spacecraft properties
- Manufacturer: RCA Astro
- Launch mass: 297 kilograms (655 lb)

Start of mission
- Launch date: December 15, 1968, 17:21:04 UTC
- Rocket: Delta N
- Launch site: Vandenberg SLC-2E

End of mission
- Disposal: Decommissioned
- Deactivated: March 12, 1976

Orbital parameters
- Reference system: Geocentric
- Regime: Low Earth
- Semi-major axis: 7,816.70 kilometers (4,857.07 mi)
- Eccentricity: 0.0031481
- Perigee altitude: 1,421 kilometers (883 mi)
- Apogee altitude: 1,470 kilometers (910 mi)
- Inclination: 101.31 degrees
- Period: 114.63 minutes
- Epoch: December 7, 2013, 13:01:30 UTC

ESSA-8 was a weather satellite launched by the National Aeronautics and Space Administration (NASA) on December 15, 1968, from Vandenberg Air Force Base, California. Its name was derived from that of its oversight agency, the Environmental Science Services Administration (ESSA).

ESSA-8 was an 18-sided polygon. It measured 42 inches (110 cm) in diameter by 22 inches (56 cm) in height, with a mass of 130 kilograms (290 lb). It was made of aluminum alloy and stainless steel covered with 10,020 solar cells. The cells charged 63 nickel–cadmium batteries, which served as a power source. The satellite could take 8 to 10 pictures every 24 hours. Each photo covered a 2,000-square-mile (5,200 km^{2}) area at a resolution of 2 miles (3.2 km) per pixel.

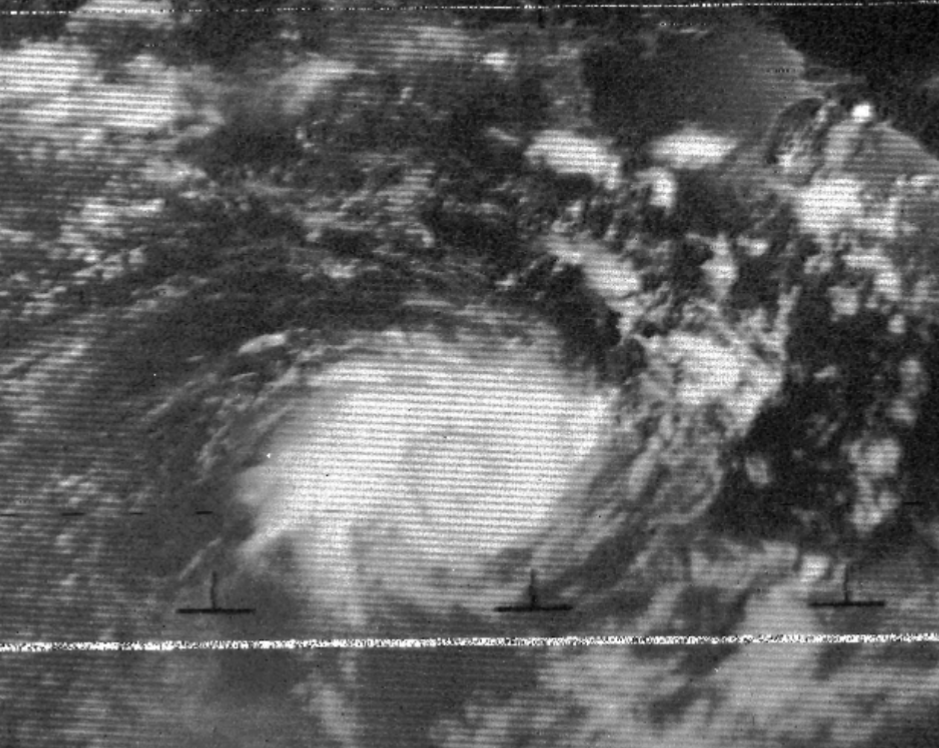
A picture taken by the ESSA-8 satellite that shows Cyclone Tracy on December 25, 1974

ESSA-8's mission was to replace ESSA-6, and provide detailed cloud pattern photography to ground stations worldwide. Partners in the project included NASA, ESSA, RCA, the National Weather Service, and the National Centers for Environmental Prediction (NMC).

ESSA-8 operated for 2,644 days until it was deactivated on March 12, 1976.
