= ESSA-2 =

American weather satellite

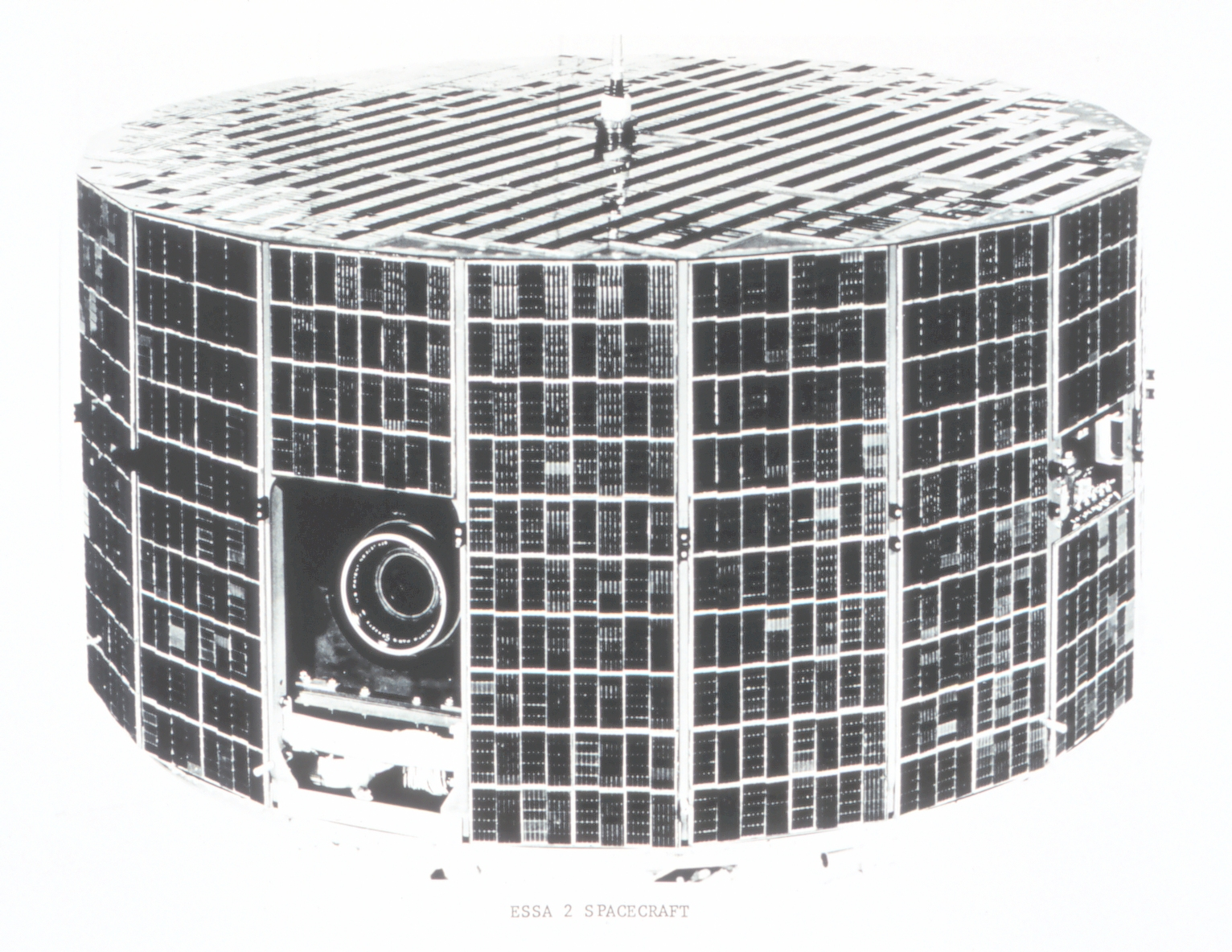
- ESSA 2
- Mission type: Weather satellite
- Operator: ESSA/NASA
- COSPAR ID: 1966-016A
- SATCAT no.: 2091

Spacecraft properties
- Manufacturer: RCA Astro
- Launch mass: 286 kilograms (631 lb)

Start of mission
- Launch date: February 3, 1966, 13:55 UTC
- Rocket: Delta E
- Launch site: Cape Canaveral LC-17B

End of mission
- Disposal: Decommissioned
- Deactivated: October 16, 1970

Orbital parameters
- Reference system: Geocentric
- Regime: Low Earth
- Semi-major axis: 7,115.60 kilometers (4,421.43 mi)
- Eccentricity: 0.00399
- Perigee altitude: 1,355 kilometers (842 mi)
- Apogee altitude: 1,415 kilometers (879 mi)
- Inclination: 101.3°
- Period: 113.5 minutes
- Epoch: February 28, 1966

ESSA-2 (or OT-2) was a spin-stabilized operational meteorological satellite. Its name was derived from that of its oversight agency, the Environmental Science Services Administration (ESSA).

== Launch ==
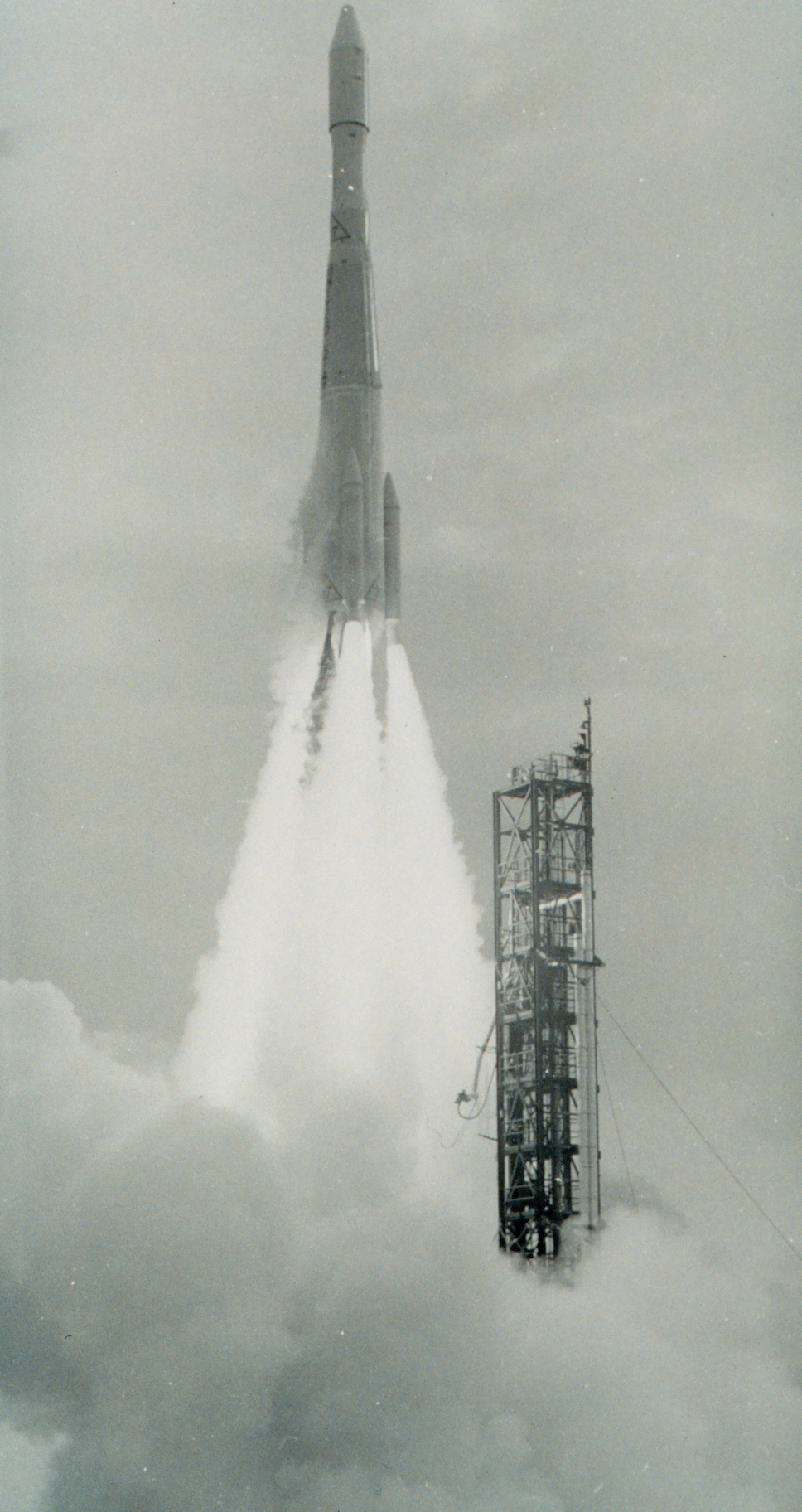
Launch of ESSA-2.

ESSA-2 was launched on February 28, 1966, at 13:55 UTC. It was launched atop a Delta rocket from Cape Canaveral, Florida. The spacecraft had a mass of 132 kilograms (291 lb) at the time of launch. ESSA-2 had an inclination of 101.3°, and an orbited the Earth once every 113 minutes. Its perigee was 1,355 kilometers (842 mi) and its apogee was 1,455 kilometers (904 mi).

== Mission ==
ESSA-2 was a Sun-synchronous polar-orbiting weather satellite whose mission was to provide real-time pictures of cloud cover using the automatic picture transmission system. These cloud cover pictures were used by meteorologists for use in weather forecasting and analysis. The satellite provided useful cloud pictures for more than four years before the camera systems were placed in standby mode on March 20, 1970. ESSA-2 was fully deactivated on October 16, 1970.

== Gallery ==
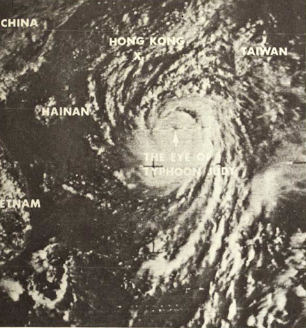
Typhoon Judy by ESSA-2 on May 1966

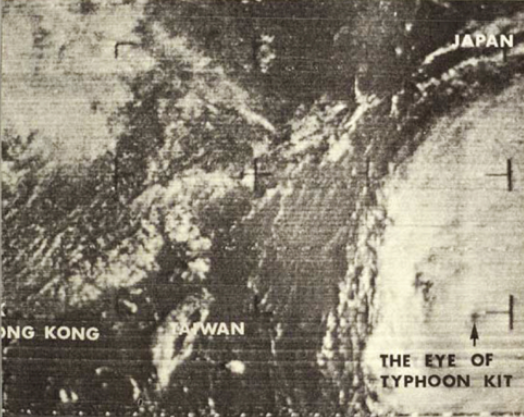
Typhoon Kit by ESSA-2 on June 1966

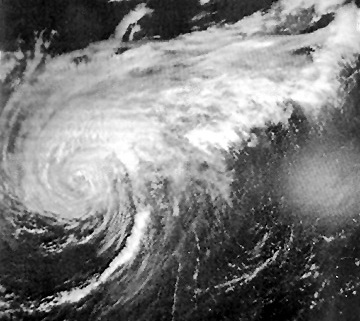
Hurricane Faith by ESSA-2 on September 1, 1966 as it moved towards Cape Hatteras on the North Carolina coast.

Hurricane Inez by ESSA-2 on September 20, 1966

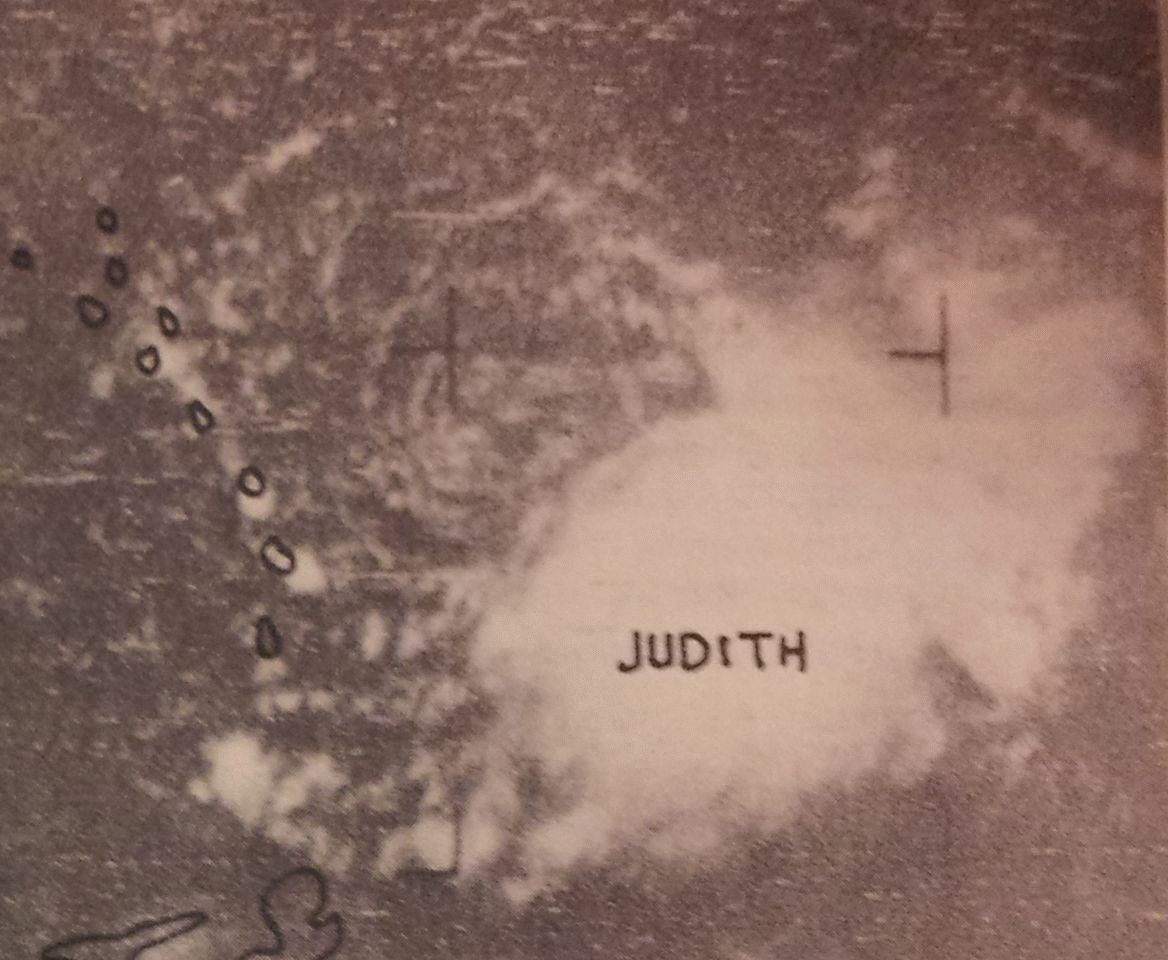
Tropical Storm Judith by ESSA-2 on September 29, 1966

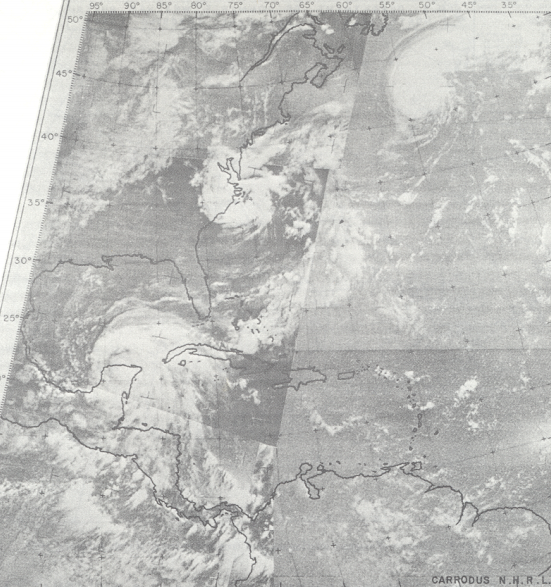
Composite of ESSA 2 photographs, September 17, 1967, showing Beulah (over the northern Yucatán Peninsula), Doria (over the North Carolina coast), and Chloe (southeast of Newfoundland).
