= ESSA-3 =

Decommissioned American weather satellite

ESSA 3
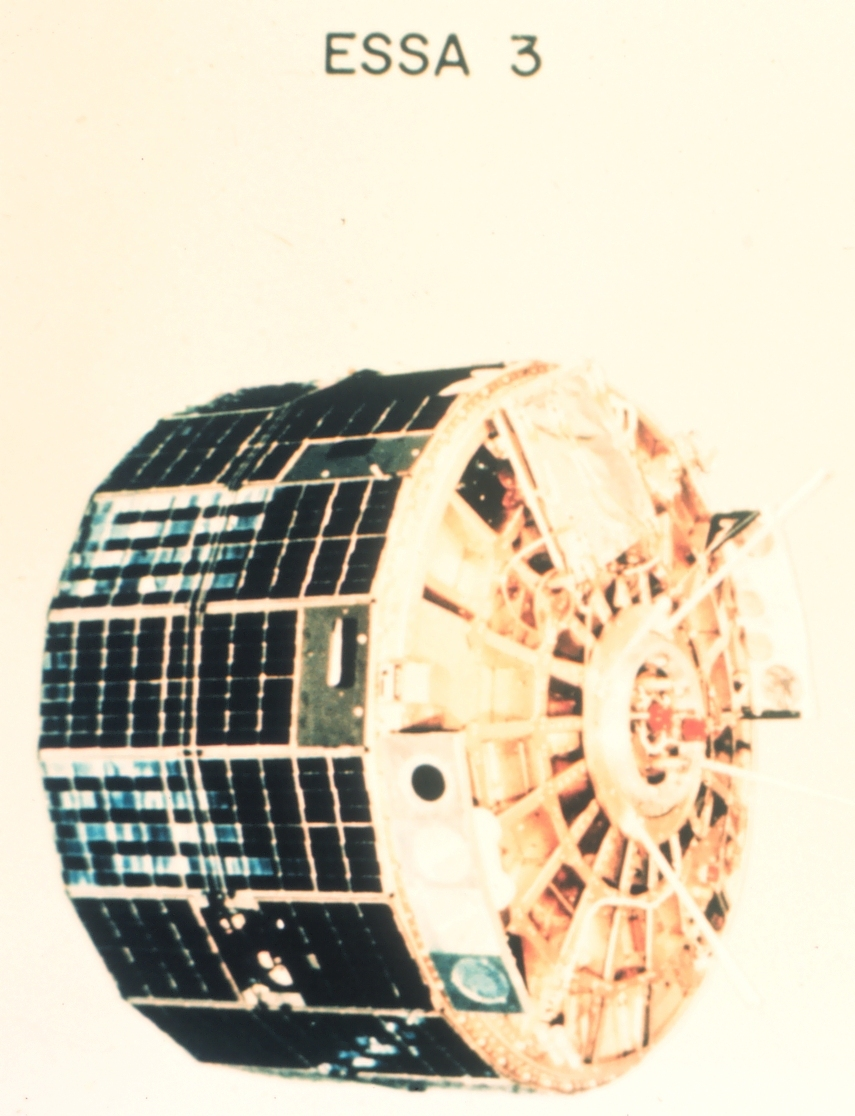
- Names: TOS-A
- Mission type: Weather satellite
- Operator: ESSA/NASA
- COSPAR ID: 1966-087A
- SATCAT no.: 2435

Spacecraft properties
- Manufacturer: RCA Astro
- Launch mass: 145 kilograms (320 lb)

Start of mission
- Launch date: October 2, 1966, 10:34 UTC
- Rocket: Delta C
- Launch site: Vandenberg LC-2E

End of mission
- Disposal: Decommissioned
- Deactivated: December 2, 1968

Orbital parameters
- Reference system: Geocentric
- Regime: Low Earth
- Eccentricity: 0.00703
- Perigee altitude: 1,383 kilometers (859 mi)
- Apogee altitude: 1,493 kilometers (928 mi)
- Inclination: 100.9°
- Period: 114.6 minutes
- Epoch: October 2, 1966

ESSA 3 (or TOS-A) was a spin-stabilized operational meteorological satellite. Its name was derived from that of its oversight agency, the Environmental Science Services Administration (ESSA).

== Operation ==
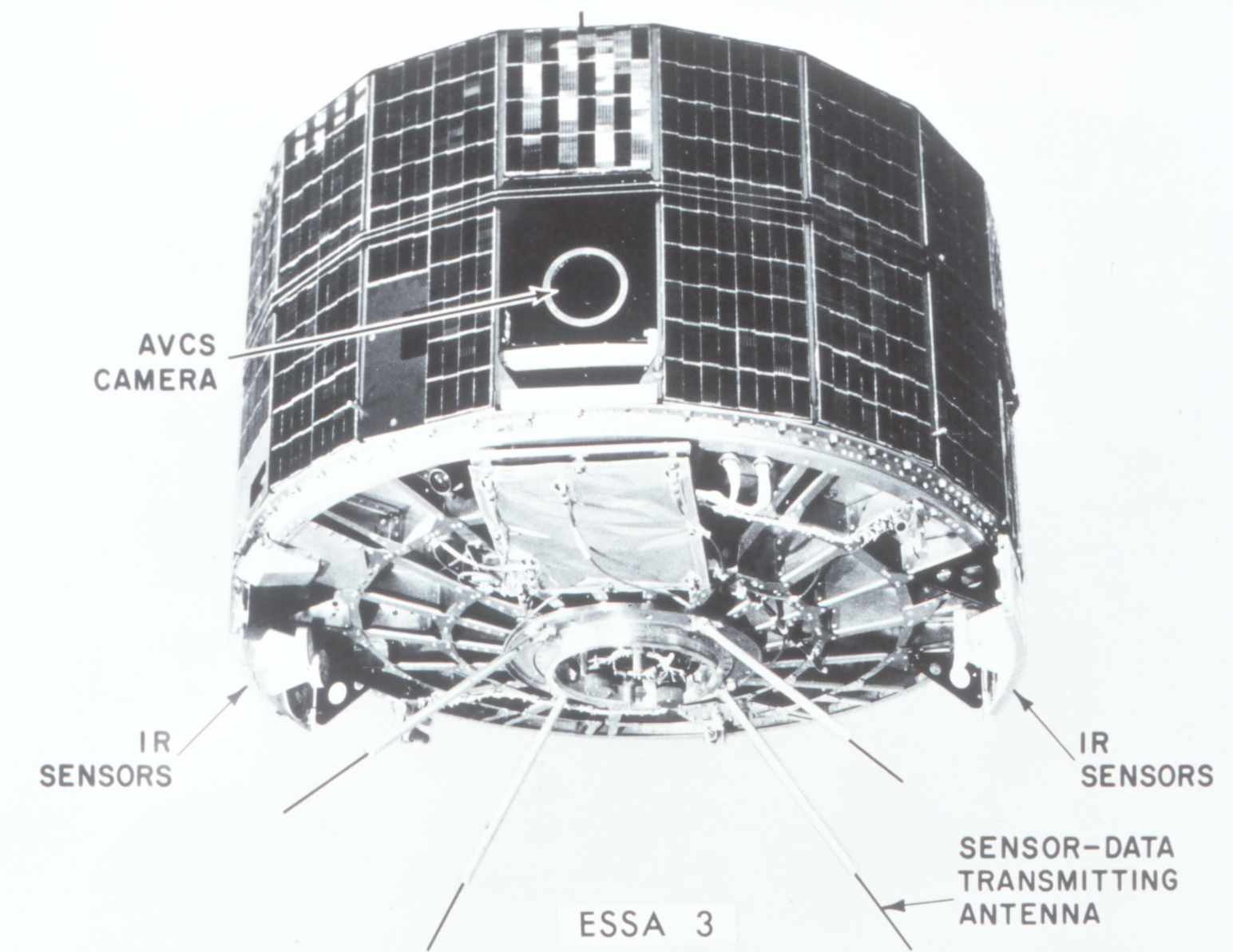
ESSA 3 components

The satellite's skeleton was made of aluminum and stainless steel and had the shape of a prism with an eighteen-sided base.

Power was supplied by 12,000 1x2 cm photovoltaic cells arranged on its sides, which were used to charge 21 NiCd batteries.

Stabilization in orbit was provided by rotational movement at a speed of 9.2 revolutions per minute, maintained by a magnetic attitude control system (MASC, Magnetic Attitude Spin Coil). Its actuator was a coil, and the torque necessary for position control was generated by the interaction of the Earth's magnetic field with the magnetic field induced in the satellite. An additional stabilization system was provided by five constant-current engines mounted on the circumference of its bottom.

A single monopole antenna placed at top was used for communication with Earth. Two dipole antennas (4 rods protruding from the bottom) were used to transmit telemetry.

Cameras were triggered automatically when Earth entered the field of view. The pictures were transmitted directly to Earth or recorded onboard. The satellite was equipped with two twin independent wide-angle Vidicon television cameras. These could work simultaneously or alternately.

The satellite was also equipped with a Flat Plane Radiometer (FPR) used to measure solar energy reflected from the Earth.

== Mission ==
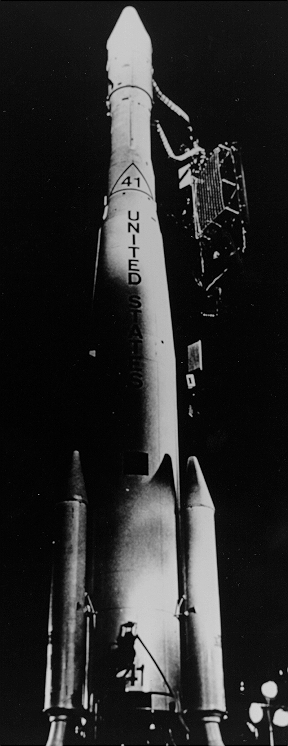
Delta E rocket with ESSA 3

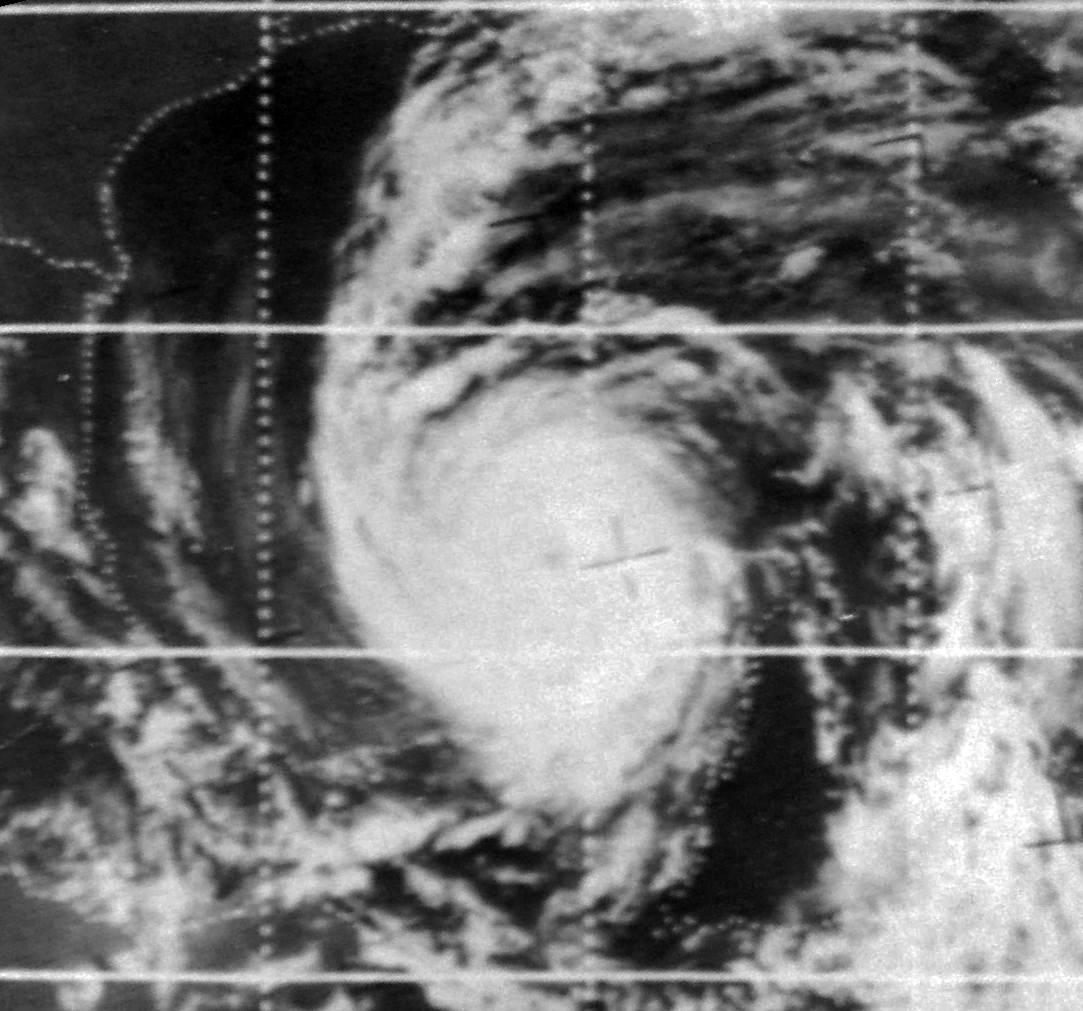
Hurricane Inez by ESSA 3 on October 3, 1966

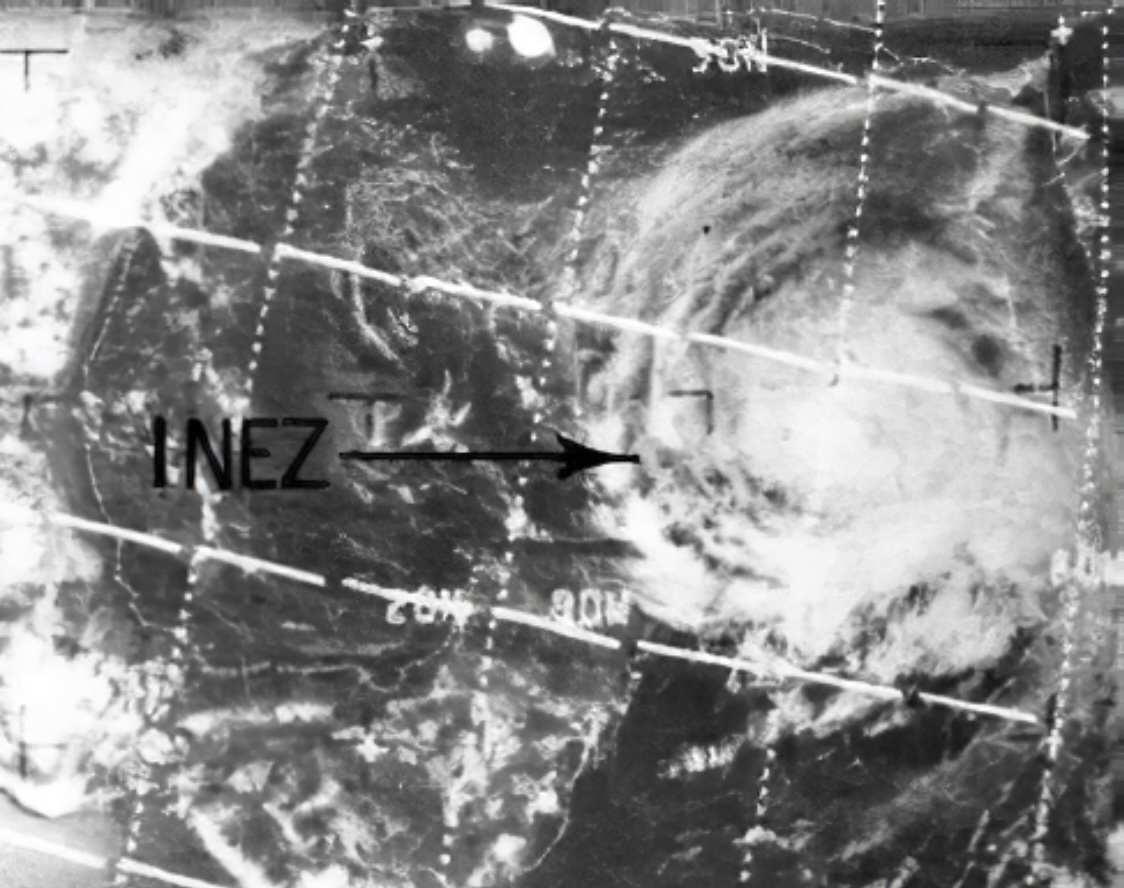
Hurricane Inez by ESSA 3 on October 5, 1966

ESSA-3 was launched on October 2, 1966, at 10:34 UTC. It was launched atop a Delta rocket from Vandenberg Air Force Base, California. The spacecraft had a mass of 132 kilograms (291 lb) at the time of launch. ESSA-3 had an inclination of 100.9°, and an orbited the Earth once every 114 minutes. Its perigee was 1,383 kilometers (859 mi) and its apogee was 1,493 kilometers (928 mi).

One of the first images taken by ESSA 3 was of Category 4 Hurricane Inez over the Bahamas and Florida.

The satellite operated without failures until January 20, 1967, when its FPR radiometer stopped working. On September 29, 1967, one of the cameras stopped working. On October 9, 1968, the second camera failed. The satellite was decommissioned on December 2, 1968.
