= ESSA-5 =

NASA meteorological satellite launched in 1967

ESSA 5
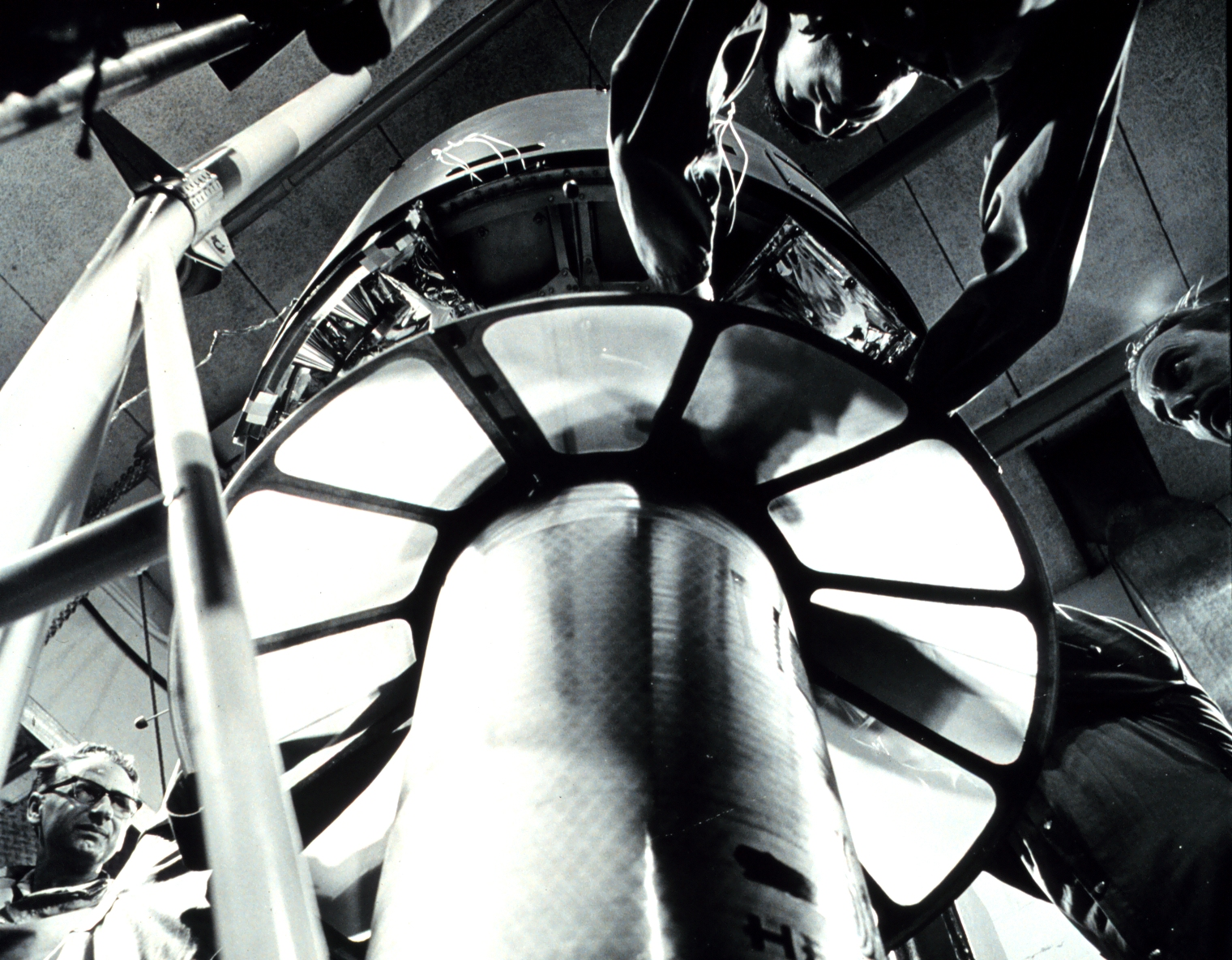
- ESSA 5 prior to launch
- Names: TOS-C
- Mission type: Weather
- Operator: NASA
- COSPAR ID: 1967-036A
- SATCAT no.: S02757

Spacecraft properties
- Launch mass: 145 kg (320 lb)

Start of mission
- Launch date: April 20, 1967, 11:17 UTC GMT
- Rocket: Delta
- Launch site: Vandenberg Air Force Base

Orbital parameters
- Reference system: Geocentric orbit
- Regime: Low Earth orbit
- Eccentricity: 0.00399
- Perigee altitude: 1,361 km (846 mi)
- Apogee altitude: 1,423 km (884 mi)
- Inclination: 101.970°
- Period: 113.63 minutes

ESSA-5 (or TOS-C) was a spin-stabilized operational meteorological satellite. Its name was derived from that of its oversight agency, the Environmental Science Services Administration (ESSA).

== Launch ==
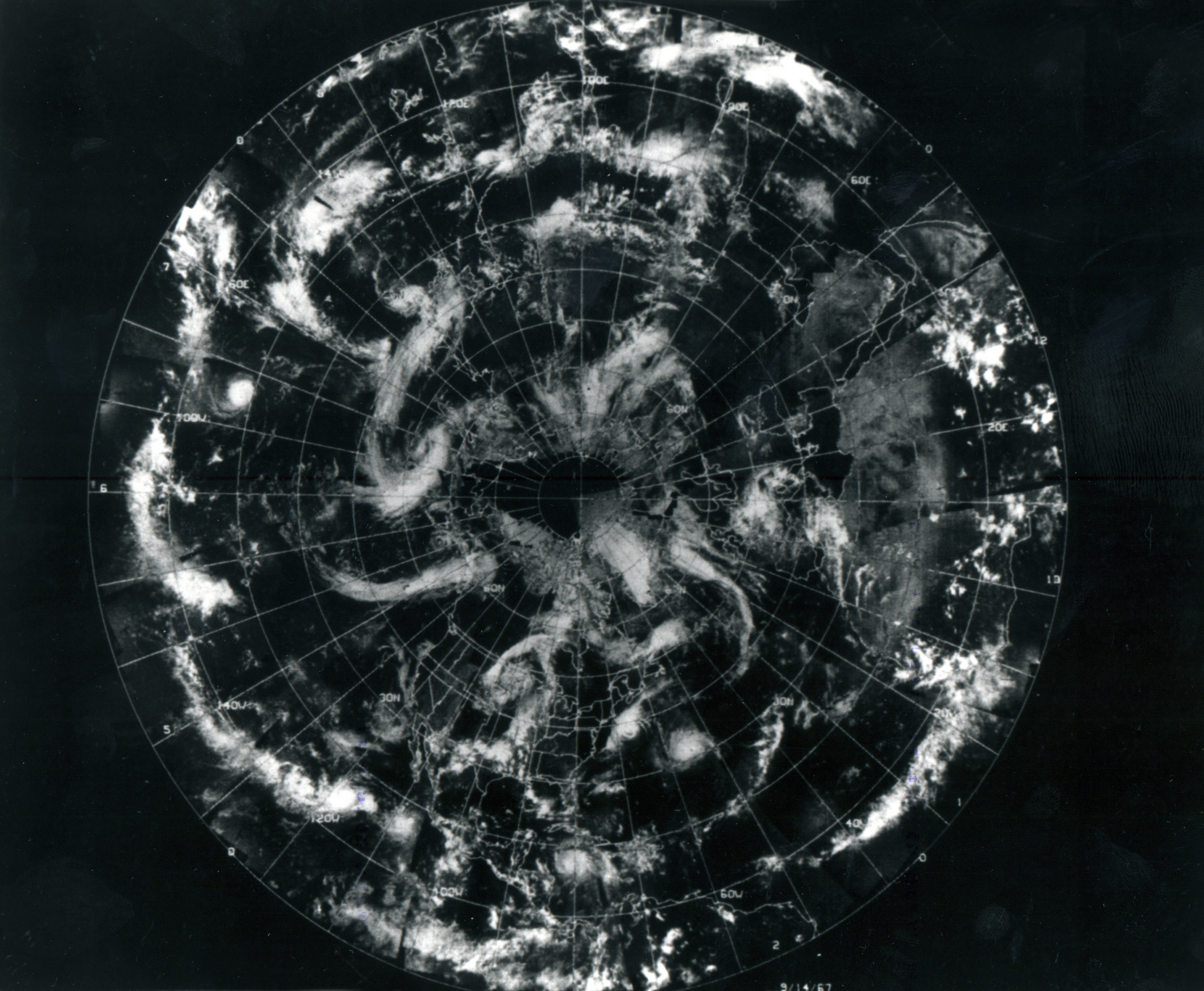
Mosaic of Clouds from ESSA-5 satellite

ESSA-5 was launched on April 20, 1967, at 11:17 UTC. It was launched atop a Delta rocket from Vandenberg Air Force Base, California, U.S.. The spacecraft had a mass of 145 kilograms (320 lb) at the time of launch. ESSA-5 had an inclination of 101.9°, and an orbited the Earth once every 113.6 minutes. Its perigee was 1,361 kilometers (846 mi) and its apogee was 1,423 kilometers (884 mi).
