= ESSA-4 =

Former American weather satellite

ESSA 4
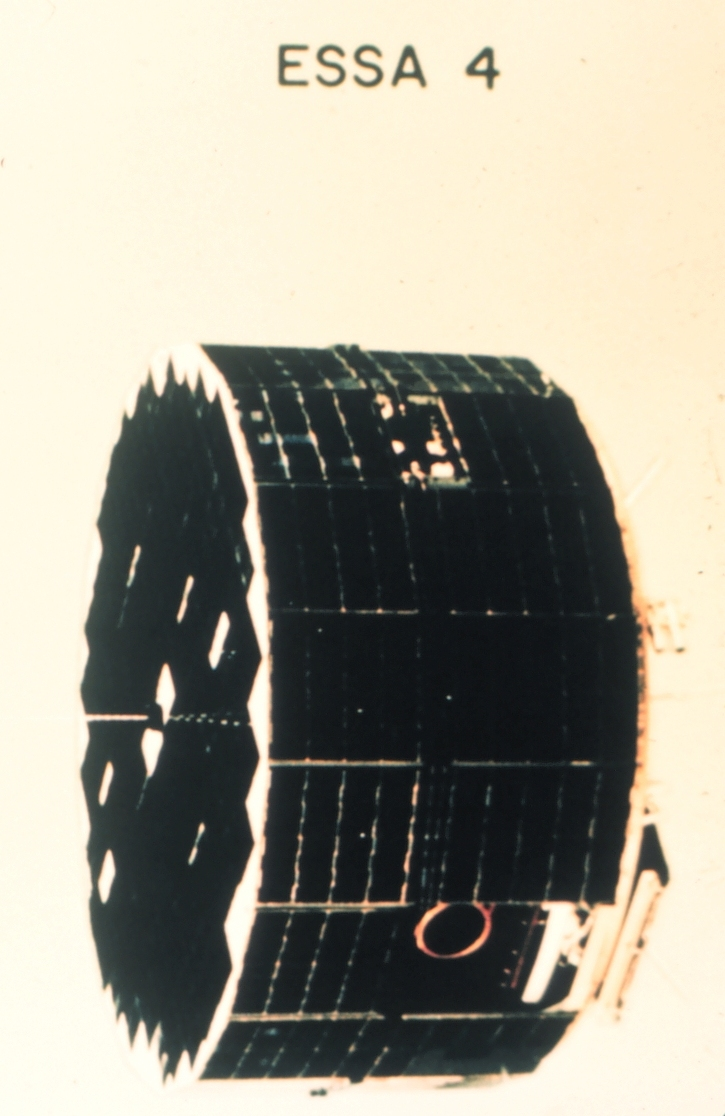
- Mission type: Weather
- Operator: NASA
- COSPAR ID: 1967-006A
- SATCAT no.: S02657

Spacecraft properties
- Launch mass: 290 kg (640 lb)

Start of mission
- Launch date: 21 January 1967, 17:31 GMT
- Rocket: Thor-Delta E
- Launch site: Vandenberg Space Launch Complex 2
- Entered service: 21 January 1967

End of mission
- Deactivated: 5 May 1968

Orbital parameters
- Reference system: Geocentric orbit
- Regime: Low Earth orbit
- Eccentricity: 0.00740
- Perigee altitude: 1,338 km (831 mi)
- Apogee altitude: 1,443 km (897 mi)
- Inclination: 102°
- Period: 113.48 minutes

ESSA-4 (or TOS-B) was a spin-stabilized operational meteorological satellite. Its name was derived from that of its oversight agency, the Environmental Science Services Administration (ESSA).

== Background ==
ESSA 4 was launched to replace ESSA 2, launched February 3, 1966, which had drifted into an orbit of limited usefulness. The satellite was financed, managed, and operated by the Environmental Science Services Administration (ESSA).

== Spacecraft ==
The 290 lb (130 kg) cartwheel-shaped spacecraft carried two Automatic Picture Transmission (APT) systems, with which it could instantly transmit photos of Earth's cloudcover to APT ground stations.

== Launch ==
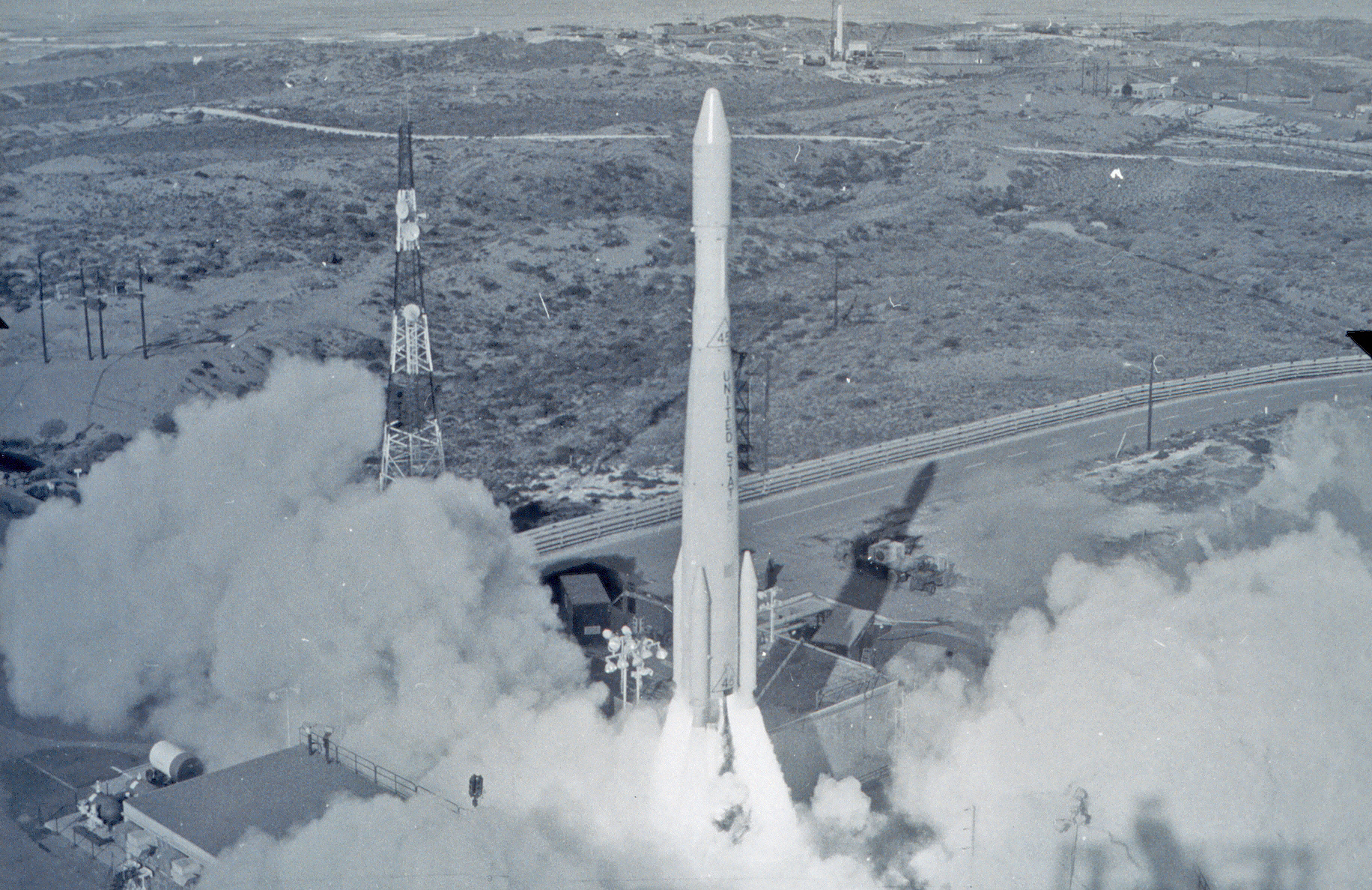
Launch of ESSA-4.

ESSA-4 was launched on January 26, 1967, at 17:31 UTC. It was launched atop a Delta rocket from Vandenberg Space Launch Complex 2, into Sun-synchronous orbit. ESSA-4 had an inclination of 102°, and an orbited the Earth once every 113.4 minutes. Its perigee was 1,328 kilometers (825 mi) and its apogee was 1,443 kilometers (897 mi).

The satellite properly aligned itself with respect to the Earth during its 18th orbit, whereupon its first photos were transmitted. A two-week spacecraft checkout and evaluation program ensued. One of the APTs failed after launch, but the other performed normally.

== Legacy and status ==
ESSA 4 was turned operationally off on December 6, 1967, being finally deactivated on May 5, 1968.
