= ESSA-9 =

Meteorological satellite

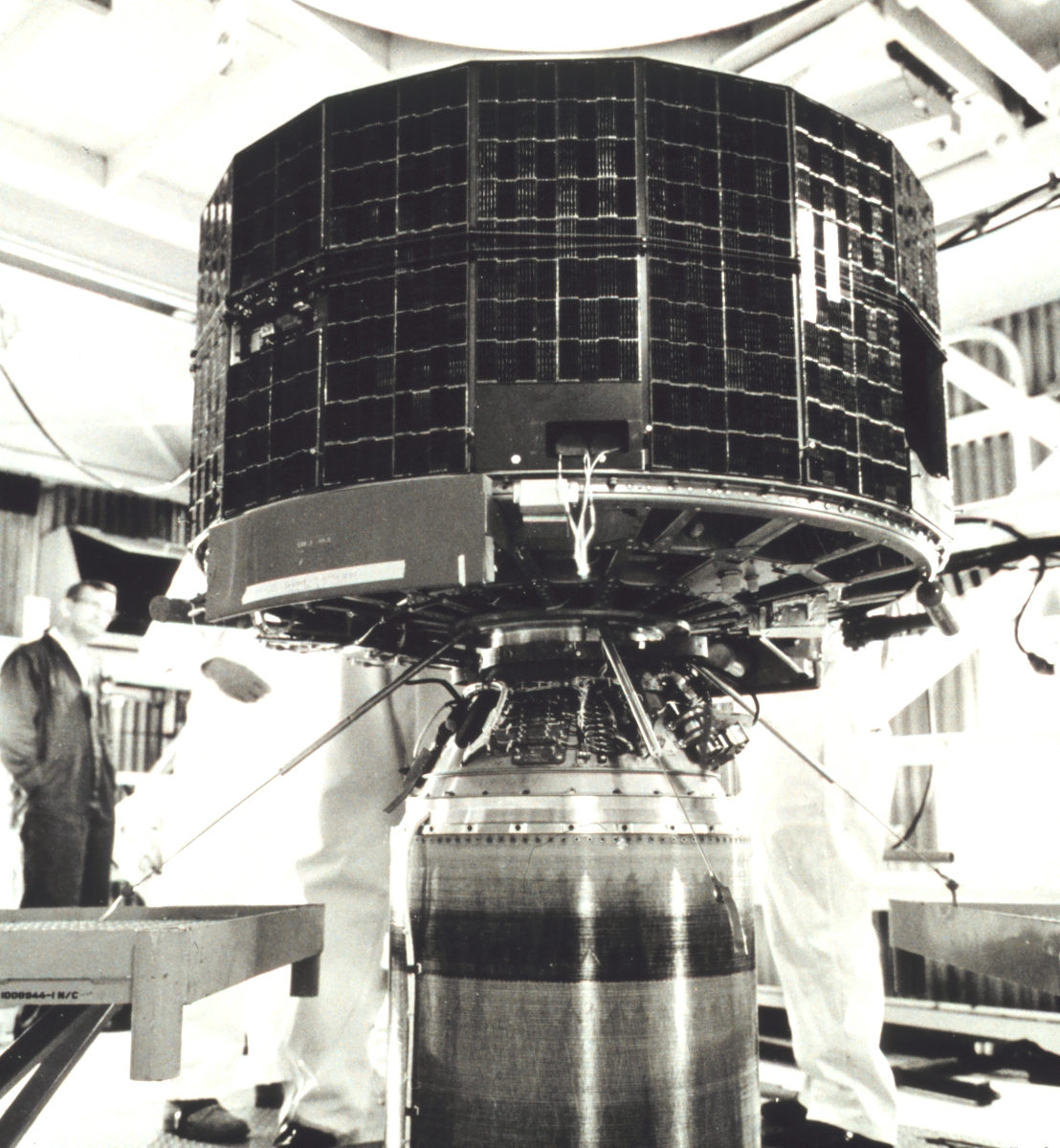
- ESSA-9 being checked out before launch
- Mission type: Meteorology
- Operator: ESSA (1969-70); NOAA (1970-72)
- COSPAR ID: 1969-016A
- SATCAT no.: 3764
- Mission duration: 1,726 days (achieved); 56 years, 9 months and 22 days (in orbit)

Spacecraft properties
- Launch mass: 145 kilograms (320 lb)

Start of mission
- Launch date: February 26, 1969, 07:47:01 UTC
- Rocket: Delta E1
- Launch site: Cape Canaveral LC-17B

End of mission
- Disposal: Decommissioned
- Deactivated: November 1972

Orbital parameters
- Reference system: Geocentric
- Regime: Low Earth
- Semi-major axis: 7,843.18 kilometers (4,873.53 mi)
- Eccentricity: 0.00508
- Perigee altitude: 1,432 kilometers (890 mi)
- Apogee altitude: 1,512 kilometers (940 mi)
- Inclination: 101.99 degrees
- Period: 115.21 minutes
- Mean motion: 12.49
- Epoch: December 7, 2013, 20:28:49 UTC

Instruments
- Advanced Vidicon Camera System (AVCS), Flat Plate Radiometer (FPR)

ESSA-9, also known as TOS-G, was a meteorological satellite. Its name was derived from that of its oversight agency, the Environmental Science Services Administration (ESSA). ESSA-9 replaced the ESSA-7 satellite.

== Launch and orbit ==
ESSA-9 was launched on a three-stage Delta rocket from Cape Canaveral, Florida. The launch occurred at 07:47 UTC (02:47 EDT) on February 26, 1969. The spacecraft was placed in a Sun-synchronous orbit of 101.4° inclination. Immediately after launch ESSA-9 had a perigee of 1,427.0 kilometers (886.7 mi) and an apogee of 1,508.0 kilometers (937.0 mi), giving it an orbital period of 115.2 minutes, or a mean motion of 12.5 orbits per day. ESSA-9 operated for 1,726 days before it was deactivated in November 1972.

== Spacecraft ==
The ESSA-9 spacecraft was similar to the TIROS series of satellites, having an 18-sided polygonal shape that measured 42 inches (110 cm) in diameter and 22 inches (56 cm) high. It weighed 320 pounds (150 kg). The body of ESSA-9 was made of aluminum alloy and stainless steel. The shell of the craft was covered with 10,020 solar cells. The solar cells recharged the 63 nickel–cadmium batteries during the time the spacecraft was in sunlight. ESSA-9 employed the same cartwheel-style stabilization as the TIROS-9 satellite. The satellite used a magnetic attitude spin coil (MASC) to control its attitude while in orbit. The magnetic field induced by the MASC's current interacted with the Earth's magnetic field to provide the torque necessary to maintain a desired spin rate of 9.225 rpm.

== Instruments ==
ESSA-9 carried two sets of two main instruments, the Advanced Vidicon Camera System (AVCS) and the Flat Plate Radiometer (FPR). The AVCS was used to collect imagery of cloud cover on Earth. The cameras had a resolution of 2 miles (3.2 km) and covered an area of 2,000 square miles (5,200 km^{2}). The cameras took single images of a particular region of the Earth's surface once a day. The FPR's were used to measure the global distribution of solar radiation reflected by the Earth and the Earth's atmosphere. They also measured long-wave emissions from the Earth. The sensors used in the ESSA satellites were from the earlier Nimbus program.

== Gallery ==
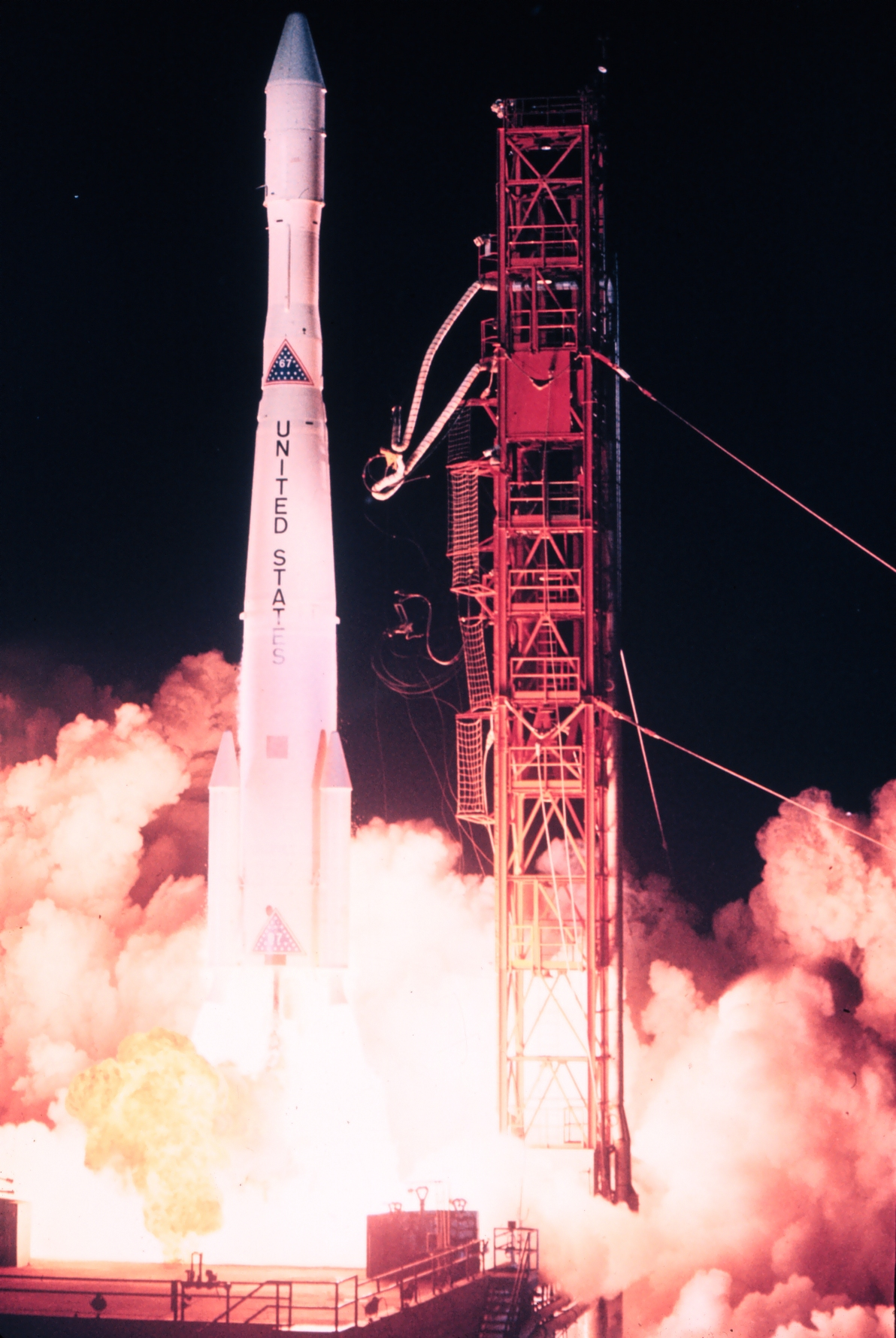
ESSA-9 is launched aboard a Delta E1 rocket from Cape Canaveral, Florida, on February 26, 1969.

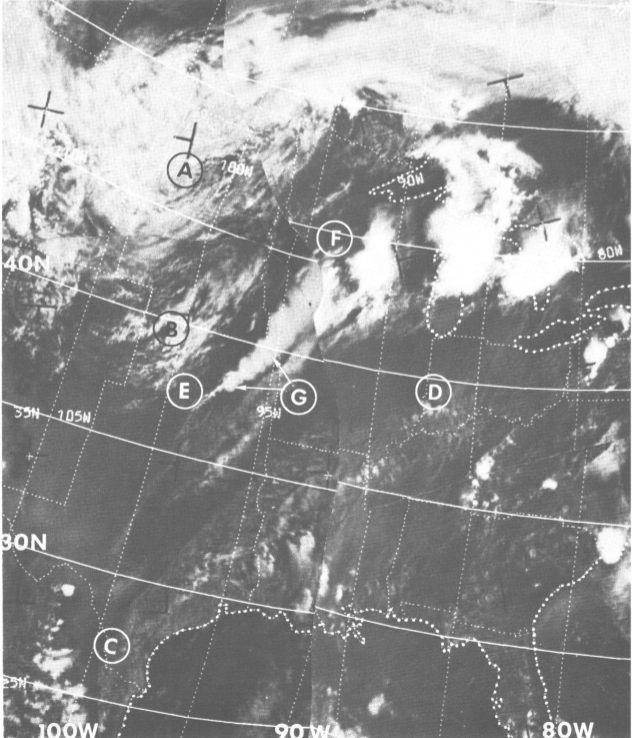
Mosaic of ESSA-9 weather photographs of the United States, Passes 1504–1505, 1901-2057 GYT, June 26, 1969.

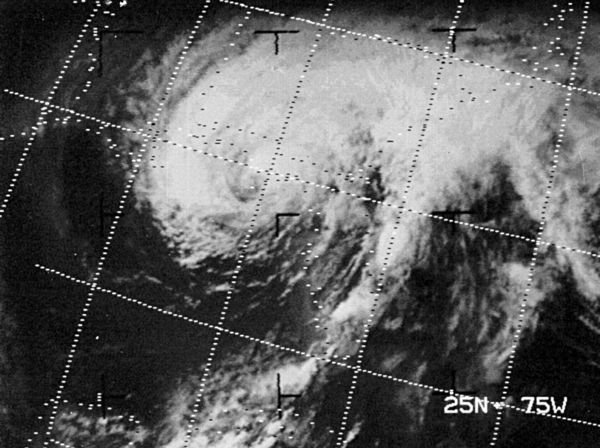
Part of a ESSA-9 image showing Hurricane Agnes on June 19, 1972 as it approaches Florida.
