= Environmental Science Services Administration =

Former U.S. government scientific agency

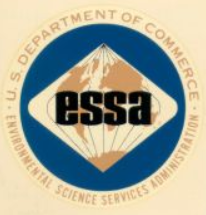
- Seal

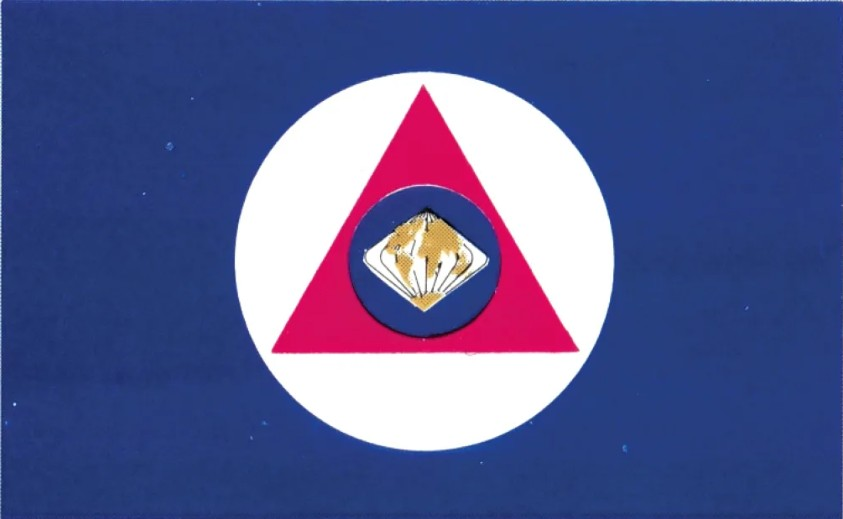
- Flag

Agency overview
- Formed: on July 13, 1965; 61 years ago
- Preceding agencies: United States Weather Bureau; United States Coast and Geodetic Survey
- Dissolved: on October 3, 1970; 56 years ago
- Superseding agency: National Oceanic and Atmospheric Administration
- Jurisdiction: United States federal government
- Headquarters: Rockville, Maryland
- Agency executive: Robert M. White, Administrator (1965–1970)
- Parent agency: U.S. Department of Commerce

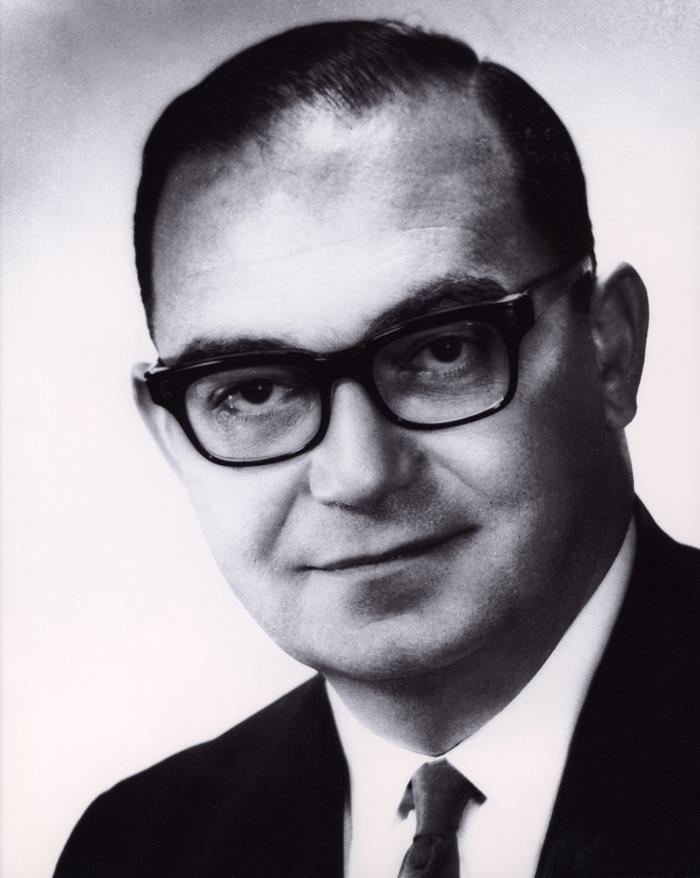
Robert M. White, ca. 1971. He was the Administrator of ESSA throughout its existence.

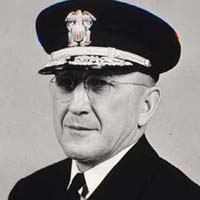
Vice Admiral H. Arnold Karo was Deputy Administrator of ESSA from 1965 to 1967.

The Environmental Science Services Administration (ESSA) was a United States federal executive agency created in 1965 as part of a reorganization of the United States Department of Commerce. Its mission was to unify and oversee the meteorological, climatological, hydrographic, and geodetic operations of the United States. It operated until 1970, when it was replaced by the new National Oceanic and Atmospheric Administration (NOAA).

The first U.S. government organization with the word "environment" in its title, ESSA was the first such organization chartered to study the global natural environment as whole, bringing together the study of the oceans with that of both the lower atmosphere and the ionosphere. This allowed the U.S. government for the first time to take a comprehensive approach to studying the oceans and the atmosphere, also bringing together various technologies – ships, aircraft, satellites, radar, and communications systems – that could operate together in gathering data for scientific study.

== Establishment and mission ==
In May 1964, the U.S. assistant secretary of commerce for science and technology, Dr. John Herbert Hollomon Jr., established a special committee to review the environmental science service activities and responsibilities of the United States Department of Commerce. Committee members included the director of the United States Weather Bureau, Dr. Robert M. White (1923–2015); the director of the United States Coast and Geodetic Survey, Rear Admiral Henry Arnold Karo (1903–1986) of the United States Coast and Geodetic Survey Corps; the director of the National Bureau of Standards, Allen V. Astin (1904–1984); and a panel of scientists from industry and academia. The committee's goal was to consider ways of improving the Department of Commerce's environmental science efforts by improving management efficiency and making the provision of environmental science services to the public more effective. The committee's work resulted in its recommendation that the Department of Commerce consolidate various scientific efforts scattered within and between the Weather Bureau, Coast and Geodetic Survey, and National Bureau of Standards by establishing a new parent agency – the Environmental Science Services Administration (ESSA) – which would coordinate the activities of the Weather Bureau and Coast and Geodetic Survey and bring at least some of their efforts, along with some of the work done in the National Bureau of Standards, together into new organizations that focused scientific and engineering mission support for shared areas of inquiry.

In a message to the United States Congress dated 13 May 1965 in which he formally proposed the creation of ESSA, U.S. President Lyndon Johnson described ESSA's mission in this way:

The new Administration will then provide a single national focus for our efforts to describe, understand, and predict the state of the oceans, the state of the lower and upper atmosphere, and the size and shape of the earth.

The director of the Weather Bureau, Dr. Robert M. White, explained that the creation of ESSA:

- responded to an increasing national need for adequate warnings of severe natural hazards (e.g., tornadoes, hurricanes, floods);
- responded to technological advances in capabilities to observe the physical environment and communicate and process environmental data; and
- would enable scientists to investigate the physical environment as a "scientific whole" rather than a "collection of separate and distinct fields of scientific interest."

ESSA was established on 13 July 1965 under the Department of Commerce's Reorganization Plan No. 2 of 1965, bringing the Coast and Geodetic Survey and the Weather Bureau together under a single parent scientific agency for the first time. Under his own authority, United States Secretary of Commerce Maurice Stans transferred the Central Radio Propagation Laboratory from the National Bureau of Standards to ESSA in October 1965.

Although the Weather Bureau and Coast and Geodetic Survey retained their independent identities under ESSA, the offices of Director of the Weather Bureau and Director and Deputy Director of the Coast and Geodetic Survey were abolished. These offices were replaced by a new administrator and deputy administrator of ESSA.

== Components and activities ==
=== Headquarters ===
ESSA was headquartered in Rockville, Maryland, with the ESSA administrator as its senior executive. It consisted of five principal service and research elements, each of which reported directly to the ESSA administrator: the Institutes for Environmental Research, reorganized in 1967 as the ESSA Research Laboratories; the Environmental Data Service; the United States Weather Bureau; the National Environmental Satellite Center; and the United States Coast and Geodetic Survey. Various other headquarters staff elements also reported directly to the administrator, including the U.S. ESSA Commissioned Officer Corps (or "ESSA Corps").

=== Institutes for Environmental Research/ESSA Research Laboratories ===
==== Institutes for Environmental Research (1965–1967) ====
To tackle scientific and technological problems related to understanding the global environment, ESSA created the Institutes for Environmental Research, based in Boulder, Colorado. The four institutes were:

- The Institute for Telecommunications Sciences and Aeronomy, made up mostly of personnel from the National Bureau of Standards′ old Central Radio Propagation Laboratory and the Geoacoustics Group of the National Bureau of Standards.
- The Institute for Earth Sciences, made up of staff from the Research Division of the United States Coast and Geodetic Survey.
- The Institute for Oceanography, made up of Coast and Geodetic Survey personnel.
- The Institute for Atmospheric Sciences, mostly staffed by personnel from the U.S. Weather Bureau's Office of Meteorological Research.

==== ESSA Research Laboratories (1967–1970) ====
To more precisely reflect the scope and mission of the individual elements of the Institutes for Environmental Research, ESSA reorganized them into the ESSA Research Laboratories in 1967. The ESSA Research Laboratories were made up of:

- The Earth Sciences Laboratories at Boulder, Colorado, which studied geomagnetism, seismology, geodesy, and related earth sciences; earthquake processes; the internal structure and accurate figure of the Earth; and the distribution of the Earth's mass.
- The Atlantic Oceanographic Laboratories at Miami, Florida, which studied oceanography, with an emphasis on the geology and geophysics of ocean basins, oceanic processes, sea-air interactions, hurricane research, and weather modification.
- The Pacific Oceanographic Laboratories at Seattle, Washington, which studied oceanography, the geology and geophysics of the Pacific Ocean Basin and its margins; oceanic processes and dynamics; and tsunami generation, propagation, modification, detection, and monitoring
- The Atmospheric Physics and Chemistry Laboratory at Boulder, Colorado, which studied the physics of clouds, precipitation, and the chemical composition of and nucleating substances in the lower atmosphere, and conducted laboratory and field experiments examining ways of developing feasible methods of weather modification
- The Air Resources Laboratories at Silver Spring, Maryland, which studied the diffusion, transport, and dissipation of atmospheric contaminants and the development of methods for the prediction and control of air pollution.
- The Geophysical Fluid Dynamics Laboratory at Princeton, New Jersey, which studied the dynamics and physics of geophysical fluid systems and the development of a theoretical basis for the behavior and properties of the atmosphere and the oceans through mathematical modeling and computer simulation,.
- The National Hurricane Research Laboratory at Miami, Florida, which examined tropical cyclones scientifically in order to improve predictions.
- The National Severe Storms Laboratory at Norman, Oklahoma, which studied tornadoes, squall lines, thunderstorms, and other severe local convective phenomena with a goal of improving methods of forecasting, detecting, and providing advance warnings of such storms.
- The Space Disturbances Laboratory at Boulder, Colorado, which studied the nature, behavior, and mechanisms of space disturbances and the development and use of techniques for continuous monitoring and early detection and reporting of important space disturbances.
- The Aeronomy Laboratory at Boulder, Colorado, which conducted theoretical, laboratory, rocket, and satellite studies of the physical and chemical processes controlling the mesosphere, thermosphere, exosphere and ionosphere of the Earth and equivalent regions of the atmospheres of other planets.
- The Wave Propagation Laboratory at Boulder, Colorado, which sought to develop new methods for remote sensing of the geophysical environment, with a special emphasis on the propagation of sound waves and of electromagnetic waves at millimeter, infrared, and optical frequencies.
- The Institute for Telecommunications Science in Boulder, Colorado, which served as the central U.S. Government agency for research and services in the propagation of radio waves, the radio properties of the Earth and its atmosphere, the nature of radio noise and electromagnetic interference, information transmission and antennas, and methods for the more effective use of the radio spectrum for telecommunications.
- The Research Flight Facility in Miami, Florida, which outfitted and operated aircraft specially instrumented for research and made aerial environmental measurements for ESSA and other groups.

=== Environmental Data Service ===
Under ESSA, the National Data Center was renamed the Environmental Data Service (EDS). In 1966, ESSA transferred the U.S. Coast and Geodetic Survey's Seismology Data Centers to Asheville, North Carolina, where they merged with the U.S. Weather Bureau's National Weather Records Center to create ESSA's Environmental Data Center.

=== United States Weather Bureau ===
Under the 1965 reorganization, the United States Weather Bureau became subordinate to ESSA. It retained its distinct identity as the U.S. Weather Bureau while under ESSA. It was renamed the National Weather Service (NWS) in 1970.

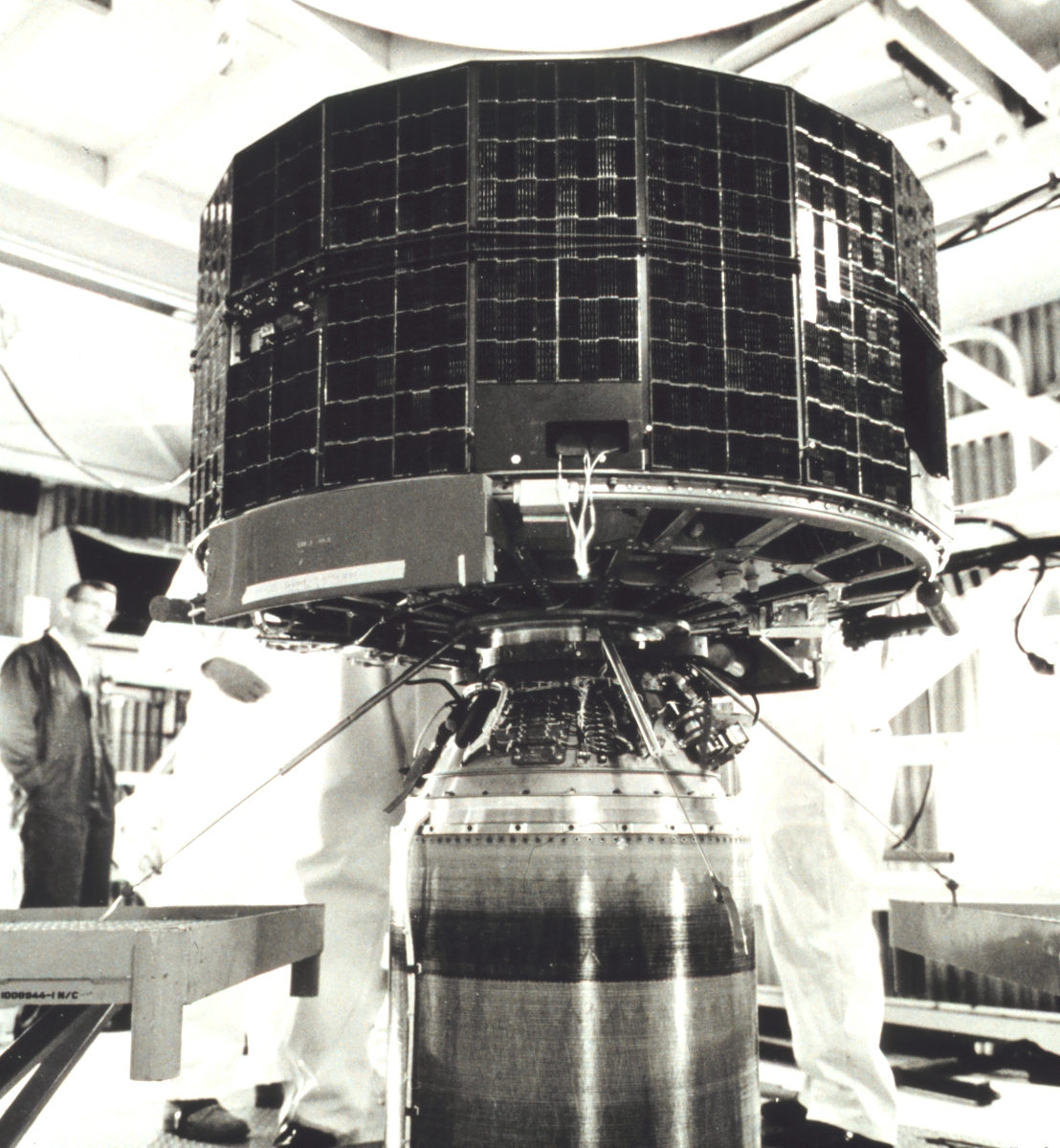
The ESSA-9 weather satellite in February 1969. It operated from February 1969 to November 1972.

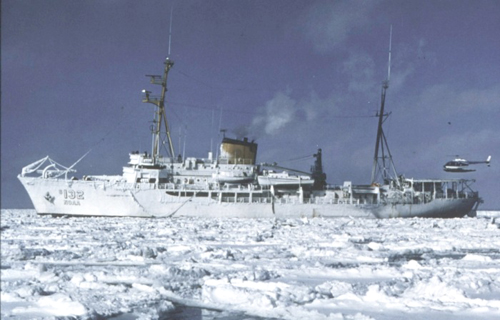
The ocean survey ship USC&GS Surveyor (OSS 32) – seen during helicopter operations in the Bering Sea – was among ships in commission in the United States Coast and Geodetic Survey fleet during the years the Survey was subordinate to ESSA.

=== National Environmental Satellite Center ===
The National Aeronautics and Space Administration (NASA) began weather satellite programs in 1958, and ESSA inherited these upon its creation in 1965. ESSA's National Environmental Satellite Center worked jointly with NASA to develop weather satellite capabilities. It managed the first operational U.S. polar orbiting weather satellite system, known as the Television Infrared Observation Satellite (TIROS) Program. These satellites, launched between 1960 and 1965 and known as TIROS 1 through 10, were the first generation of American weather satellites. These early satellites carried low-resolution television and infrared cameras. Designed mainly to test the feasibility of weather satellites, TIROS proved to be extremely successful. Four were still operating when ESSA was established in 1965.

TIROS paved the way for the more advanced weather satellites of the TIROS Operational System (TOS). The ESSA National Environmental Satellite Center worked jointly with NASA to deploy the new TOS satellites, which constituted an operational experiment with early imaging and weather broadcast systems. Nine of ESSA's TOS satellites were launched between 1966 and 1969, each named "ESSA" followed by a number from 1 to 9, beginning with the launch of ESSA-1 on 3 February 1966. The last of these satellites was decommissioned in 1977, but ESSA's work with NASA laid the foundation for the deployment of the first geostationary weather satellites, the Synchronous Meteorological Satellites of 1974 and 1975.

=== United States Coast and Geodetic Survey ===
Under the 1965 reorganization, the United States Coast and Geodetic Survey, whose history dated to 1807, was subordinated to ESSA. While under ESSA, it retained its distinct identity and continued to carry out its responsibilities for coastal and oceanic hydrographic surveys, geodetic work in the interior of the United States and at sea, and other scientific work, such as in seismology. The Coast and Geodetic Survey also continued to operate its fleet of survey ships and research ships while subordinate to ESSA.

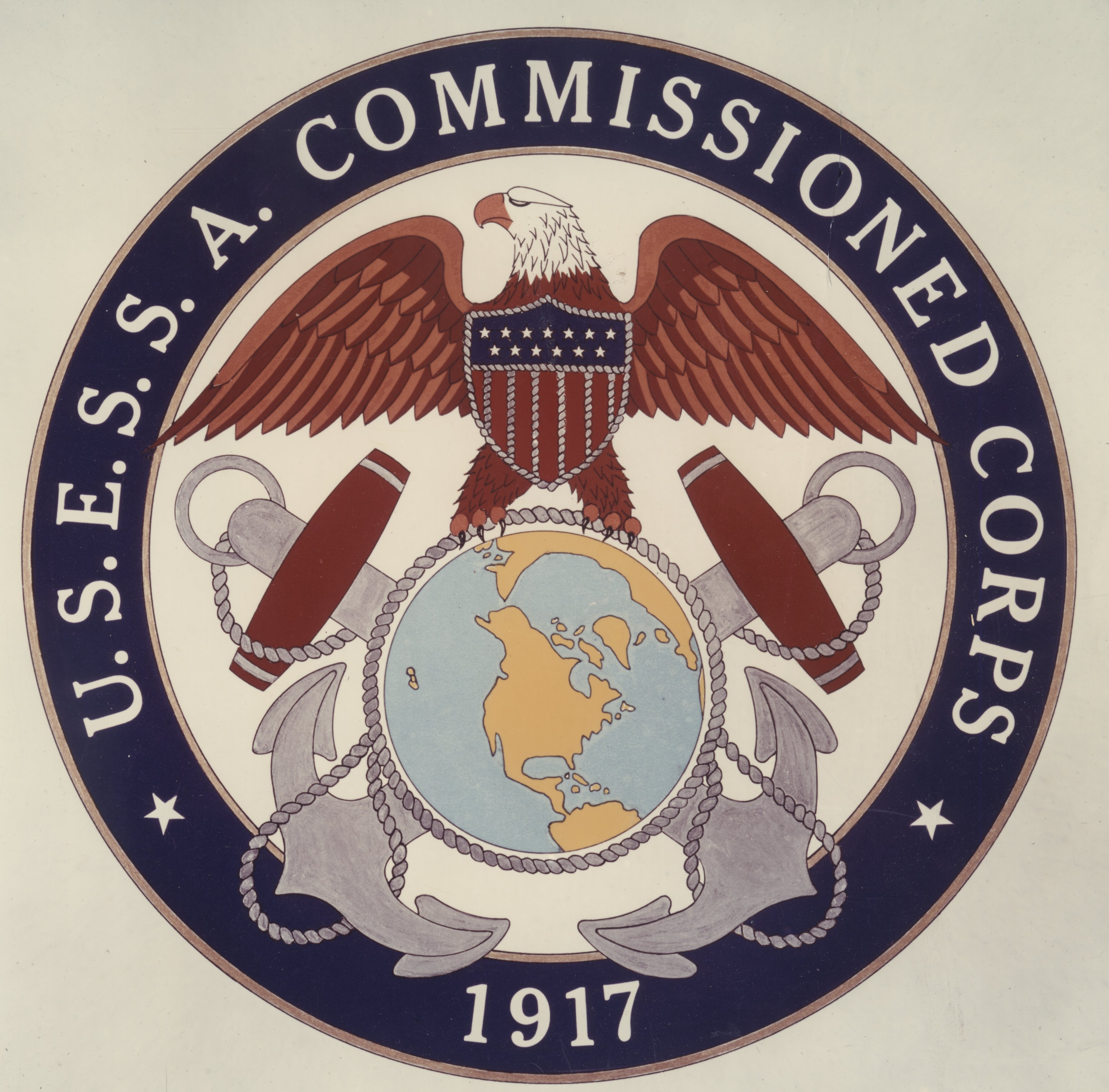
The seal of the U.S. ESSA Commissioned Officer Corps.

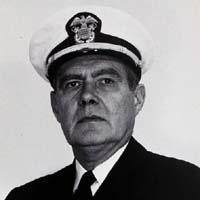
Tison

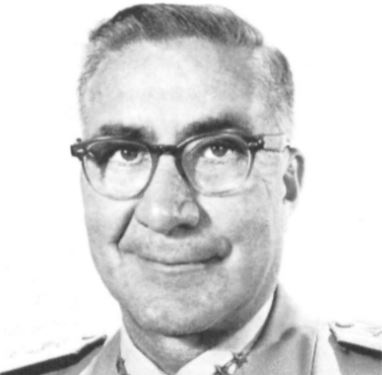
Jones

Rear Admirals James C. Tison, Jr. (1965–1968) and Don A. Jones (1968–1970) were the only two Directors of the ESSA Corps.

=== U.S. ESSA Commissioned Officer Corps (ESSA Corps) ===
In the 1965 reorganization, the commissioned officers of the United States Coast and Geodetic Survey Corps, a component of the U.S. Coast and Geodetic Survey with a history dating back to 1917, were transferred to the control of the United States Secretary of Commerce. This created the United States Environmental Science Services Commissioned Officer Corps, known informally as the "ESSA Corps," whose director reported directly to the ESSA administrator. Like the Coast and Geodetic Survey Corps before it, the ESSA Corps was responsible for providing commissioned officers to operate the Coast and Geodetic Survey's ships, fly aircraft, support peacetime defense requirements and purely civilian scientific projects, and provide a ready source of technically skilled officers which could be incorporated into the United States Armed Forces in time of war, and was one of the uniformed services of the United States.

== Senior leadership ==
Robert M. White (1923–2015) served as the administrator of ESSA throughout its existence. On the day ESSA and the ESSA Corps were created, Coast and Geodetic Survey Corps Rear Admiral Henry Arnold Karo (1903–1986) simultaneously became an ESSA Corps officer and was promoted to vice admiral to serve as ESSA's first deputy administrator. At the time the highest-ranking officer in the combined history of the Coast and Geodetic Survey Corps and ESSA Corps, Vice Admiral Karo served as Deputy Administrator of ESSA from 1965 to 1967. He was the only officer in the combined history of the Coast and Geodetic Survey Corps, ESSA Corps, and the ESSA Corps′ successor, the National Oceanic and Atmospheric Administration Commissioned Corps (NOAA Corps), to reach that rank until NOAA Corps Rear Admiral Michael S. Devany was promoted to vice admiral on 2 January 2014.

The first Director of the ESSA Corps was Rear Admiral James C. Tison, Jr. (1908–1991), who served in this capacity from 1965 to 1968. He was succeeded by the second and last Director of the ESSA Corps, Rear Admiral Don A. Jones (1912–2000), who served from 1968 to 1970.

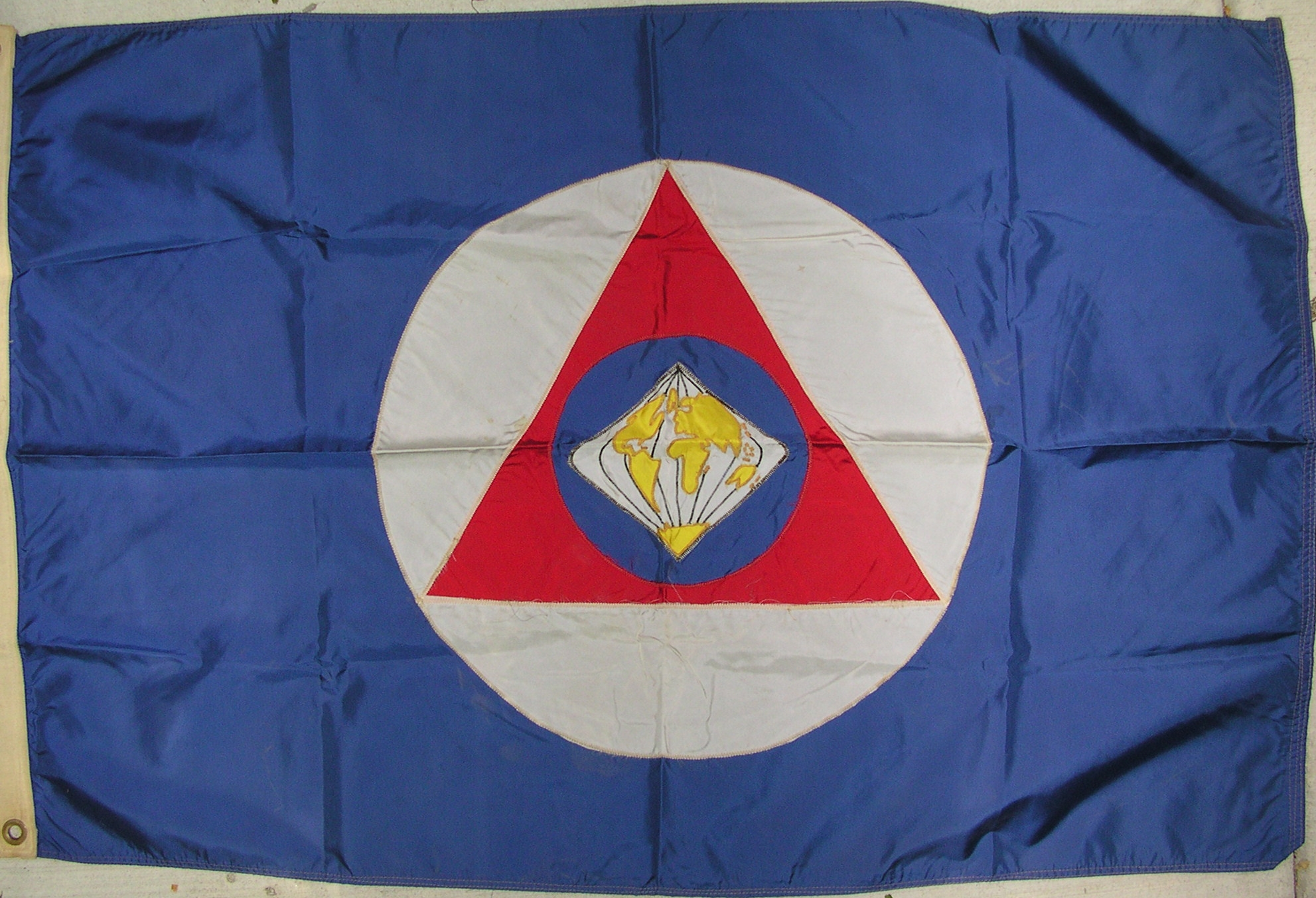
An ESSA flag.

== Flag ==
The flag of the Environmental Science Services Administration was in essence the flag of the United States Coast and Geodetic Survey, modified by the addition of a blue circle to the center of the red triangle, within which was a stylized, diamond-shaped map of the world. Because the Coast and Geodetic Survey retained its identity after it was placed under ESSA in 1965, ships of the Survey's fleet continued to fly the Coast and Geodetic Survey flag as a distinctive mark while the Survey was subordinate to ESSA.

== Disestablishment and replacement by NOAA ==
In June 1966, the U.S. Congress passed the Marine Resources and Engineering Development Act, which declared that it was U.S. Government policy to:

...develop, encourage, and maintain a coordinated, comprehensive, and long-range national program in marine science for the benefit of mankind, to assist in protection of health and property, enhancement of commerce, transportation, and national security, rehabilitation of our commercial fisheries, and increased utilization of these and other resources.

NOAA's logo.

NOAA's flag

ESSA was abolished upon the creation of the new National Oceanic and Atmospheric Administration (NOAA) on 3 October 1970. NOAA′s flag bore similarities to ESSA′s flag and, like the ESSA flag, was based on the design of the Coast and Geodetic Survey′s flag.

The act created a Commission on Marine Science, Engineering, and Resources – which came to be known informally as the "Stratton Commission" – and gave it the responsibility to review ongoing and planned U.S. Government marine science activities and recommend a national oceanographic program and a reorganization of the U.S. Government to carry out the program. President Lyndon Johnson appointed 15 members to the commission; Ford Foundation chairman Julius A. Stratton chaired it, and its members included attorney Leon Jaworski, Dean of the Graduate School of Oceanography at the University of Rhode Island John Knauss, ESSA Administrator Robert M. White, and other representatives of U.S. Government agencies, U.S. state governments, industry, academia, and other institutions with programs or interest in marine science and technology; it also included four U.S. Congressional advisors, including former U.S. Senator Warren G. Magnuson of Washington. The commission began its work in early 1967, and on 9 January 1969 it issued its final report, entitled Our Nation and the Sea: A Plan For National Action. The Commission determined that "because of the importance of the seas to this Nation and the world, our Federal organization of marine affairs must be put in order," and that fulfilling the U.S. ocean policy declared in the 1966 act and making "full and wise use of the marine environment" required the study of both the ocean and the atmosphere and their interactions with one another. Accordingly, it recommended the creation of an independent "National Oceanic and Atmospheric Agency" to administer the principal civil marine and atmospheric programs of the United States, and that the new agency be composed of the United States Coast Guard from the United States Department of Transportation; ESSA and its subordinates, the National Weather Service and U.S. Coast and Geodetic Survey, from the U.S. Department of Commerce; the Bureau of Commercial Fisheries and the functions of the Bureau of Sport Fisheries and Wildlife dealing with marine and migratory fishes from the United States Department of the Interior′s United States Fish and Wildlife Service; the National Sea Grant Program from the National Science Foundation; elements of the United States Lake Survey from the United States Department of the Army; and the National Oceanographic Data Center from the United States Department of the Navy.

Soon after the Commission published the report, the U.S. Congress began to deliberate action on it, as did the Advisory Council on Executive Organization created by President Richard Nixon in 1969. Among the Advisory Council's proposals for reorganization of the executive branch of the United States Government was one that proposed the replacement of the U.S. Department of the Interior with a new U.S. Department of Natural Resources, and that this new department include a "National Oceanic and Atmospheric Administration" which combined ESSA with some elements of the Department of the Interior; the Nixon administration considered placing the new Administration within the Department of the Interior as an interim measure pending the creation of a new Department of Natural Resources. Noting that two-thirds of the new Administration would be made up of ESSA personnel and funding, United States Secretary of Commerce Maurice Stans (1908–1998) proposed instead that the new Administration become part of the Department of Commerce, where ESSA already was in place. Nixon decided to side with Stans, as well as to incorporate some of the Stratton Commission's and Advisory Council's recommendations, and in early July 1970 submitted Department of Commerce Reorganization Plan No. 4. It proposed the creation in 90 days within the Department of Commerce of the new National Oceanic and Atmospheric Administration (NOAA), consisting of ESSA; the Bureau of Commercial Fisheries and the marine sport fishing program of the Bureau of Sport Fisheries and Wildlife; the Office of Sea Grant Programs from the National Science Foundation; the mapping, charting, and research functions of the U.S. Army's U.S. Lake Survey; the U.S. Navy's National Oceanographic Data Center; the Marine Minerals Technology Center from the Department of the Interior's United States Bureau of Mines; the U.S. Navy's National Oceanographic Instrumentation Center; and the Department of Transportation's National Data Buoy Project, although it did not follow the Stratton Commission's recommendation to include the U.S. Coast Guard in NOAA.

Accordingly, on 3 October 1970, ESSA was abolished as part of Reorganization Plan No. 4 of 1970, and it was replaced by NOAA. Under NOAA, the National Weather Service continued to operate as such, while the Coast and Geodetic Survey was disestablished and its functions were divided under various new NOAA offices, all of which fell under NOAA's new National Ocean Survey (later renamed the National Ocean Service). The Bureau of Commercial Fisheries of the United States Department of the Interior′s United States Fish and Wildlife Service was transferred to NOAA, and its fisheries science and oceanographic research ships joined the hydrographic survey ships of the former Coast and Geodetic Survey fleet to form the new NOAA fleet.

In the 1970 reorganization that created NOAA, the ESSA Corps was resubordinated to NOAA, becoming the National Oceanic and Atmospheric Administration Commissioned Officer Corps, known informally as the "NOAA Corps." Like its predecessors, the Coast and Geodetic Survey Corps and ESSA Corps, the NOAA Corps became one of the uniformed services of the United States, and carries out responsibilities similar to those of the ESSA Corps.

== Legacy ==
The first U.S. Government organization to address environmental science and earth sciences holistically, ESSA pioneered the revolutionary organizational concept of uniting scientific and engineering activities that had been scattered among its subordinate agencies so as to establish unified mission support to meet environmental science and technology objectives. ESSA's successor, NOAA, continued and broadened the application of this organizational concept by adding marine life sciences to its portfolio of holistic study of the oceans and atmosphere alongside the earth sciences subordinated to ESSA. ESSA served as the prototype not only for NOAA but also for the United States Environmental Protection Agency, which was established two months after NOAA, on 2 December 1970.

ESSA's work in designing weather satellites and managing their missions was a major step forward both technologically and in terms of weather monitoring and prediction. It prompted further development of weather satellites in the exploration of their use, playing a major role in the development of modern weather satellites.

== See also ==
- National Oceanic and Atmospheric Administration
- National Weather Service
- Television Infrared Observation Satellite
  - TIROS-1
  - TIROS-2
  - TIROS-3
  - TIROS-4
  - TIROS-5
  - TIROS-6
  - TIROS-7
  - TIROS-8
  - TIROS-9
  - TIROS-10
  - ESSA-1
  - ESSA-2
  - ESSA-3
  - ESSA-4
  - ESSA-5
  - ESSA-6
  - ESSA-7
  - ESSA-8
  - ESSA-9
- United States Coast and Geodetic Survey
