= ESSA-6 =

NASA weather satellite

ESSA 6
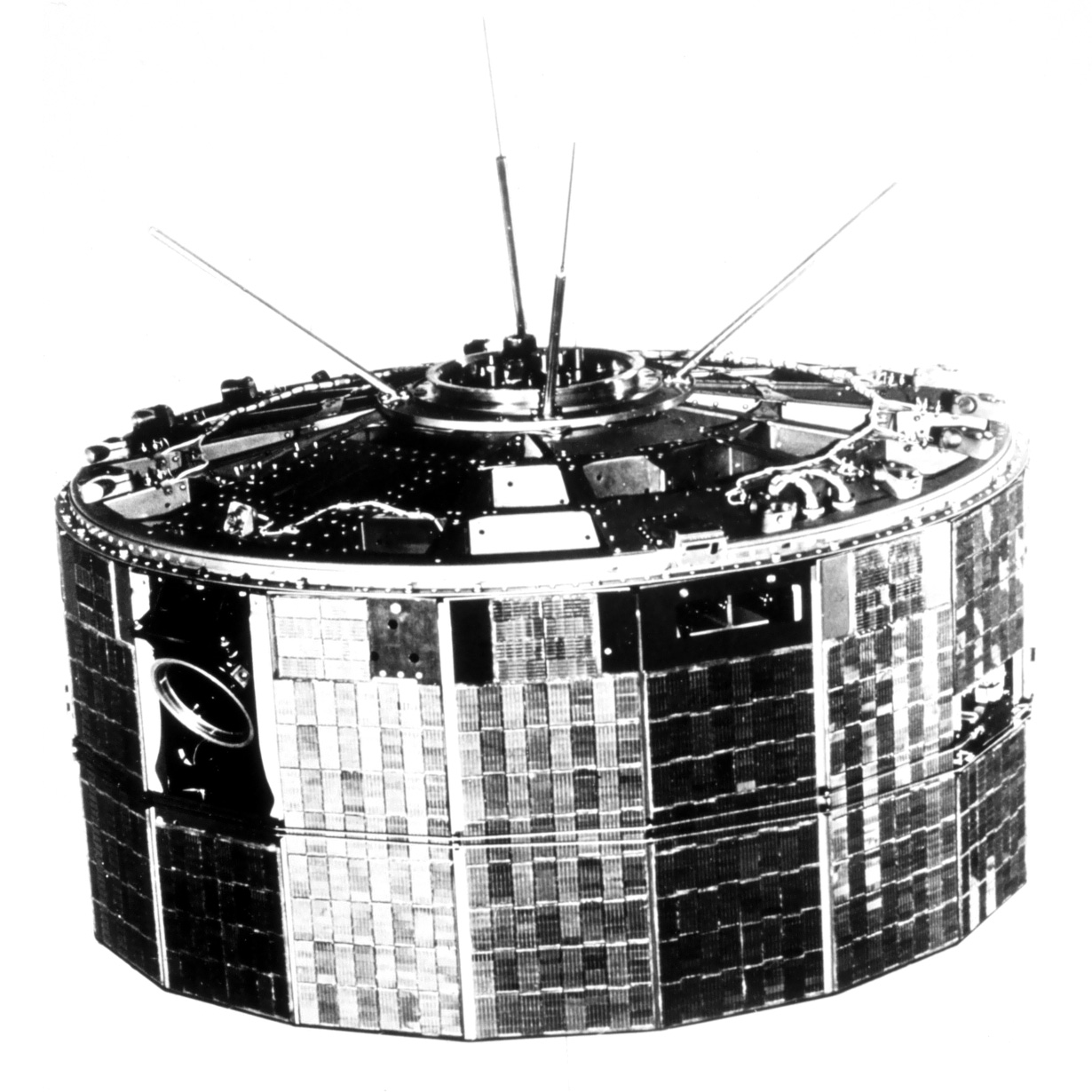
- Names: TOS-D
- Mission type: Weather
- Operator: NASA
- COSPAR ID: 1967-114A
- SATCAT no.: S03035

Spacecraft properties
- Launch mass: 145 kg (320 lb)

Start of mission
- Launch date: November 10, 1967, 18:00 UTC GMT
- Rocket: Delta
- Launch site: Vandenberg Air Force Base

Orbital parameters
- Reference system: Geocentric orbit
- Regime: Low Earth orbit
- Eccentricity: 0.00498
- Perigee altitude: 1,410 km (880 mi)
- Apogee altitude: 1,488 km (925 mi)
- Inclination: 102.12°
- Period: 114.82 minutes

ESSA 6 (or TOS-D) was a spin-stabilized operational meteorological satellite. Its name was derived from that of its oversight agency, the Environmental Science Services Administration (ESSA).

== Details ==
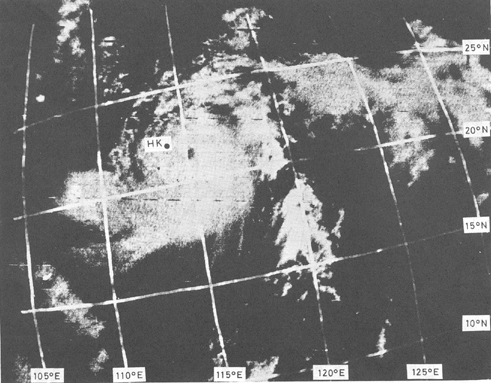
ESSA 6 picture of Typhoon 'Shirley' on August 21, 1968

ESSA 6 had a mass of 299 kilograms (659 lb) at the time of launch.

The satellite's electrical power was supplied by about 10,000 1x2 cm solar cells on the cover and 21 nickel-cadmium batteries.

Two redundant wide-angle APT (Automatic Picture Transmission) cameras, mounted on opposite sides and perpendicular to the spin axis, captured images. This subsystem was a camera-transmitter setup, designed to transmit real-time daylight images of cloud cover to ground stations. It included two 2.54-cm vidicon cameras with 108° F/1.8 lenses, mounted 180° apart. Each orbit, the cameras captured four or eight images, with picture taking lasting 8 seconds and transmission 200 seconds. The 800-line images were transmitted at 137.5 MHz to local APT stations, with reticle marks on the images to assist with geographical alignment. Each picture covered a 3100 x 3100 km area with 4 km resolution at nadir, with a 30% overlap to ensure complete coverage.

The base featured crossed-dipole antennas for command reception, while a monopole antenna provided telemetry (136.500 MHz) and tracking (136.770 MHz) from the top.

Spin rate was regulated to 10.9 rpm using a Magnetic Attitude Spin Coil (MASC), which interacted with Earth's magnetic field to maintain a stable spin axis normal to the orbital plane, within ±1 degree.

== Mission ==
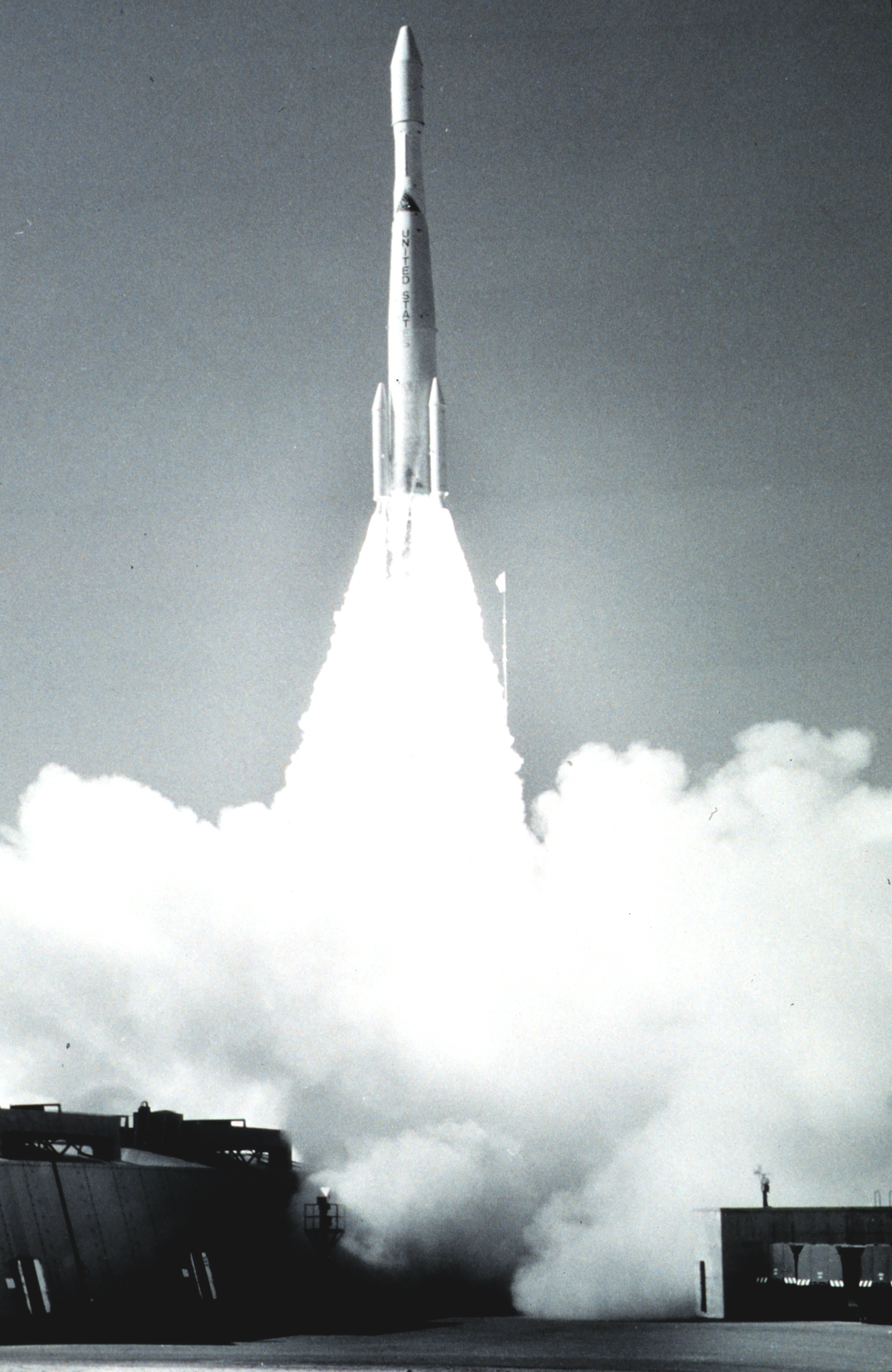
Launch of ESSA 6.

ESSA 6 was launched on November 10, 1967, at 18:00 UTC, atop a Delta rocket from Vandenberg Air Force Base, California, USA.

ESSA 6 had an inclination of 102.12°, and orbited the Earth once every 114.8 minutes. Its perigee was 1,410 kilometers (880 mi) and its apogee was 1,488 kilometers (925 mi).

The satellite performed normally after launch.

The APT camera system was successful, operating nearly continuously until November 4, 1969 when the spacecraft was deactivated.
