= ESSA-1 =

American weather satellite

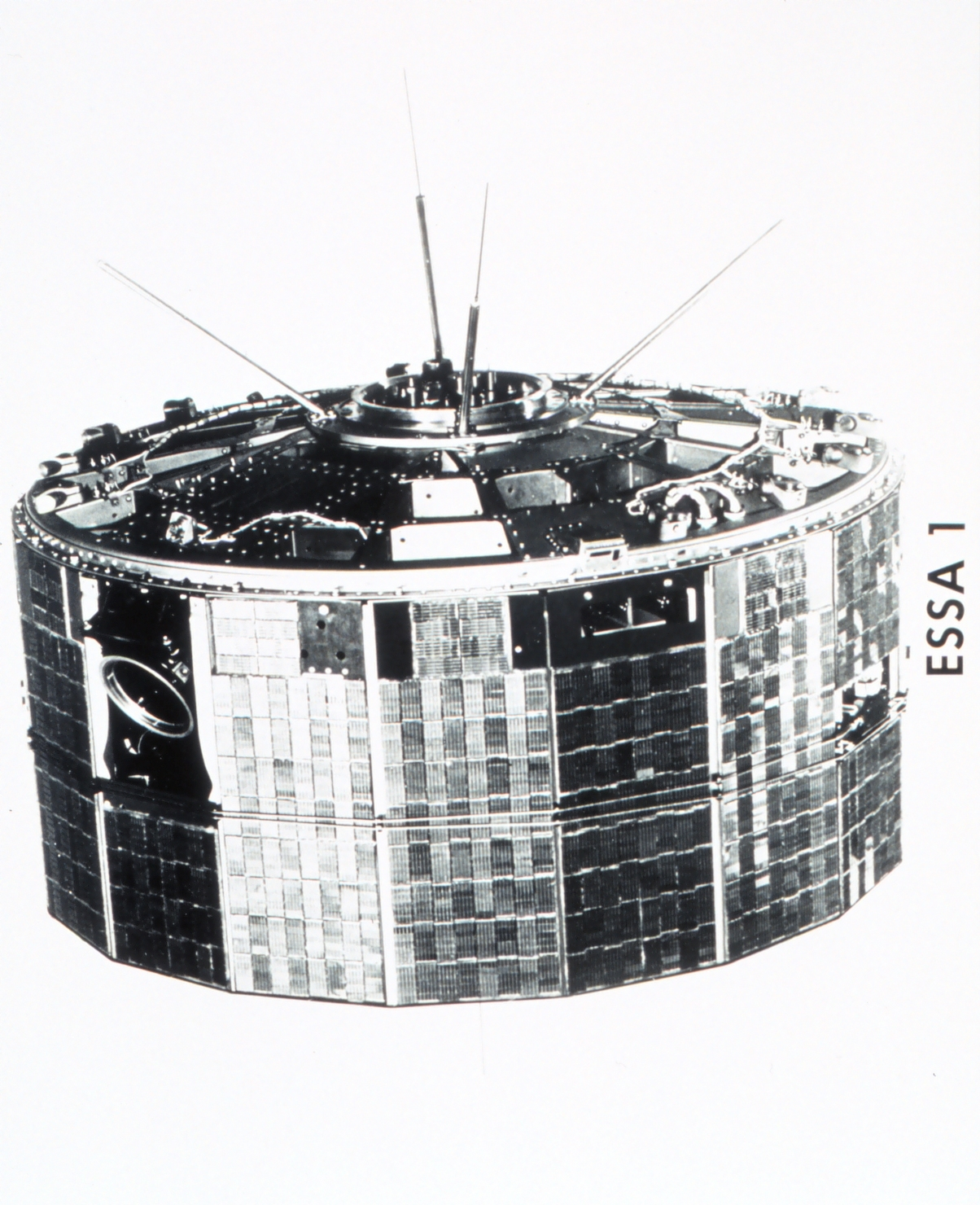
- ESSA 1
- Mission type: Weather satellite
- Operator: ESSA/NASA
- COSPAR ID: 1966-008A
- SATCAT no.: 1982
- Mission duration: Normal operation: 248 days Engineering data: 460 days

Spacecraft properties
- Manufacturer: RCA Astro
- Launch mass: 304 kilograms (670 lb)

Start of mission
- Launch date: February 3, 1966, 07:41:23 UTC
- Rocket: Delta C
- Launch site: Cape Canaveral LC-17A

End of mission
- Disposal: Decommissioned
- Deactivated: May 8, 1967

Orbital parameters
- Reference system: Geocentric
- Regime: Sun-synchronous
- Semi-major axis: 7,115.60 kilometers (4,421.43 mi)
- Eccentricity: 0.0083082
- Perigee altitude: 685 kilometers (426 mi)
- Apogee altitude: 803 kilometers (499 mi)
- Inclination: 97.94 degrees
- Period: 99.56 minutes
- Epoch: December 7, 2013, 20:11:52 UTC

ESSA-1 (or OT-3) was a spin-stabilized operational meteorological satellite. Its name was derived from that of its oversight agency, the Environmental Science Services Administration (ESSA).

== Spacecraft ==
ESSA-1 had a similar design to that of the TIROS satellite series. It was an 18-sided right prism, measuring 107 centimeters (42 in) across opposite corners and 56 centimeters (22 in). It had a reinforced baseplate, which carried most of the subsystems and a cover assembly (hat). ESSA-1 had approximately 10,000 1-cm by 2-cm solar cells, which charged 21 nickel–cadmium batteries. ESSA-1 was designed to take pictures of daytime cloud cover, record them, and transmit them when it was in range of a ground acquisition station.

The satellite spin rate and attitude were determined primarily by a magnetic attitude spin coil (MASC). The MASC was a current-carrying coil mounted in the cover assembly. The induced magnetic field induced by the coil interacted with that of the Earth's magnetic field, and provided the necessary torque to maintain a desired spin rate of 9.225 revolutions per minute (rpm). Five small solid-fuel thrusters mounted on the baseplate provided a secondary means of controlling the spin rate.

== Mission ==
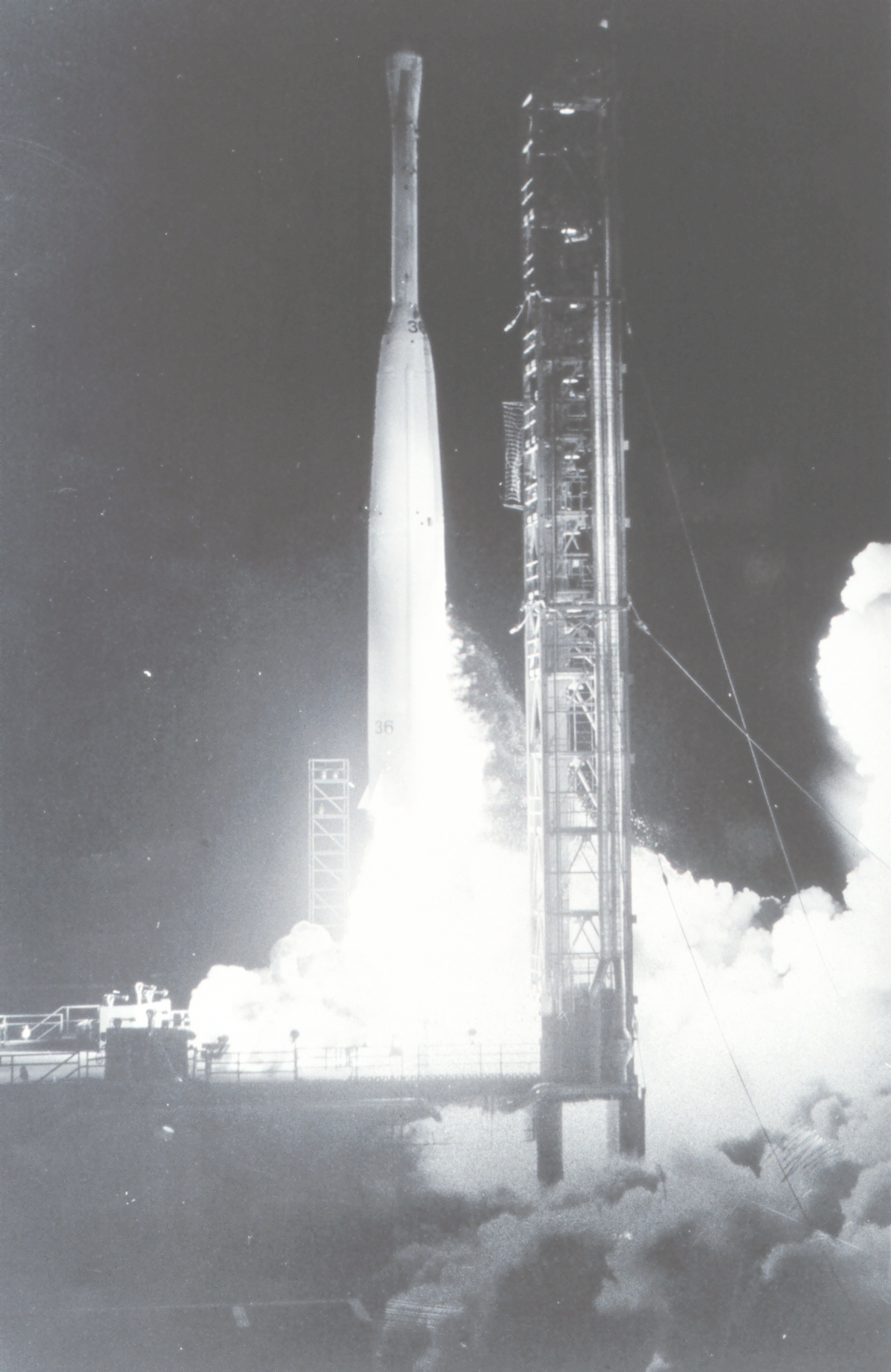
Delta rocket launching ESSA 1

ESSA-1 was launched on February 3, 1966, at 07:41 UTC. It was launched atop a Delta rocket from Cape Canaveral, Florida. The spacecraft had a mass of 304 kilograms (670 lb) at the time of launch. ESSA-1 had an inclination of 97.91°, and it orbited the Earth once every 100 minutes. Its perigee was 702 kilometers (379 nmi), and its apogee was 845 kilometers (456 nmi).

ESSA-1's first successful launch and release of pictures were marked on February 4 by NASA-ESSA, which was attended by Vice President Hubert H. Humphrey. Also in attendance were Commerce Secretary John T. Connor; Dr. Edward C. Welsh, Executive Secretary of The National Aeronautics and Space Council; and NASA Administrator James E. Webb. Involved in ESSA-1's successful launching were Dr. Morris Tepper, NASA's director of meteorology logical programs, and Herbert I. Butler, Chief of Operational Satellites.

ESSA-1 operated normally until October 6, 1966, when the camera system failed. The spacecraft was fully deactivated on May 8, 1967, after being left on for an additional period of time for engineering purposes.

== Gallery ==
Typhoon Judy by ESSA 1 on May 28, 1966

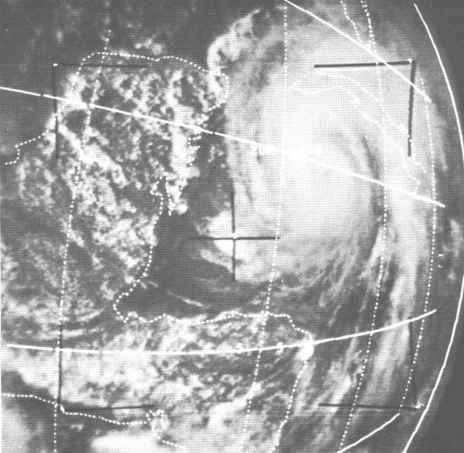
Hurricane Alma by ESSA 1 moving slowly northward toward western Cuba on June 7, 1966

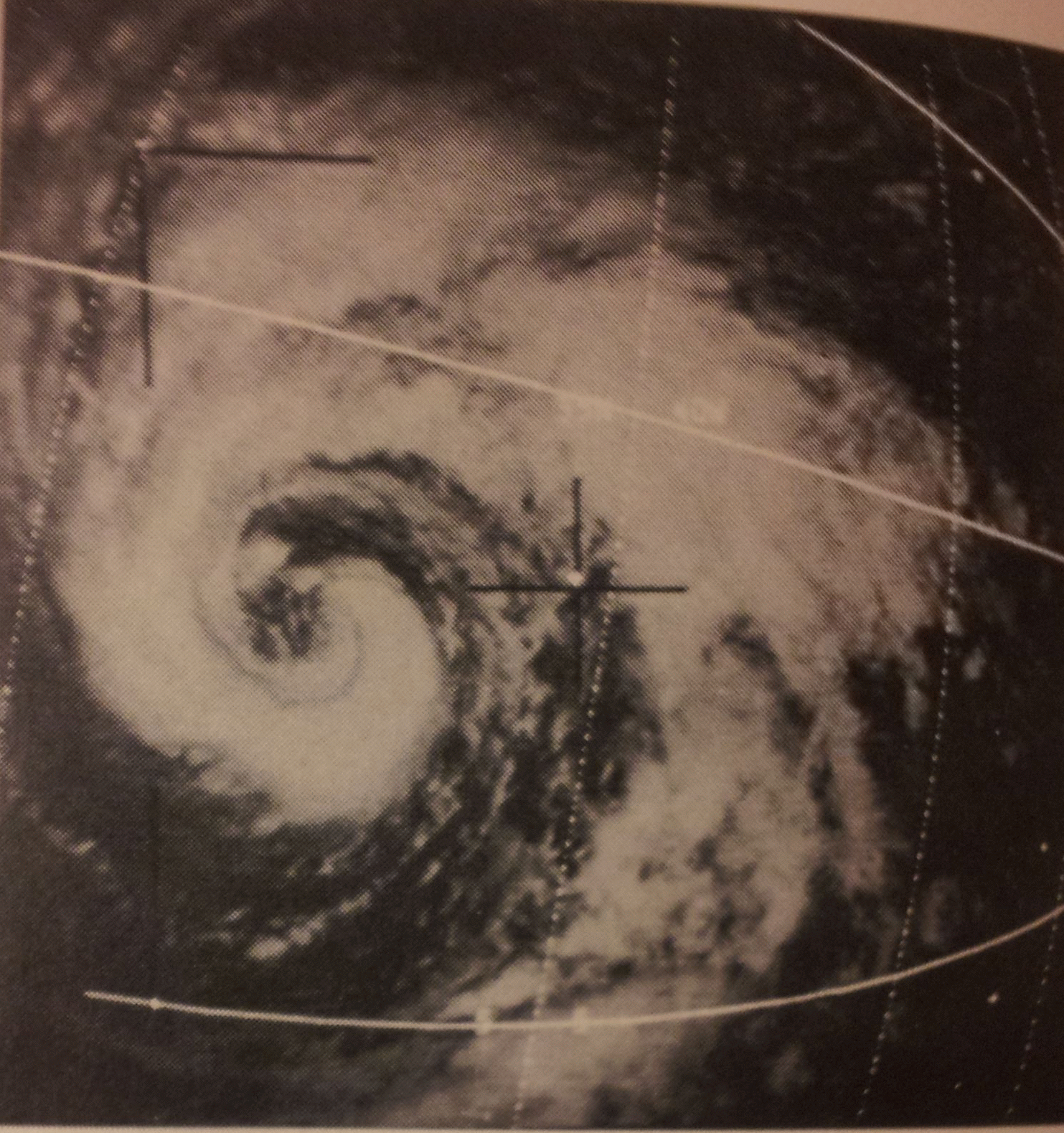
Hurricane Dorothy by ESSA 1 on July 23, 1966

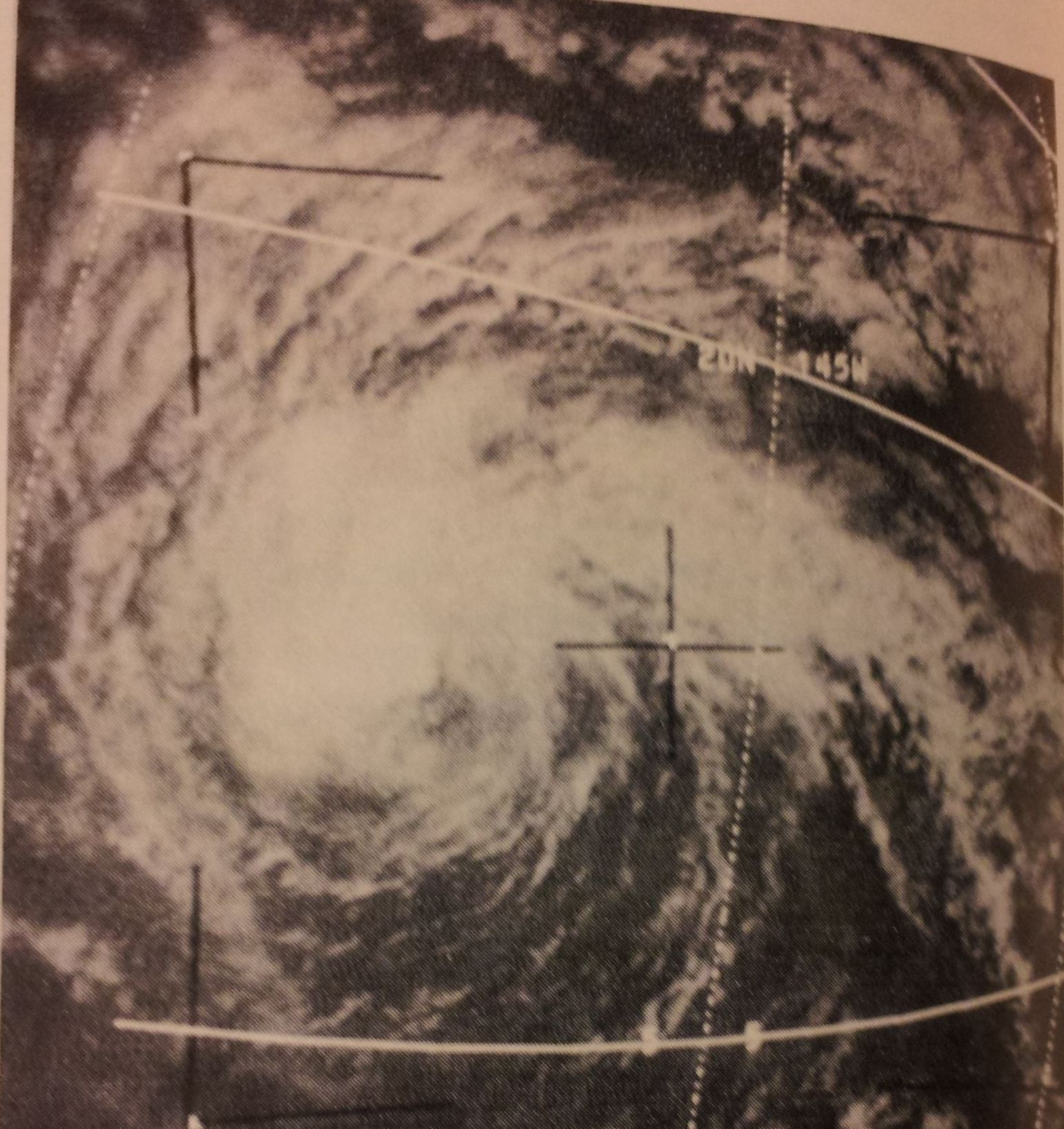
Hurricane Connie by ESSA 1 on August 14, 1966

Hurricane Inez by ESSA 1 while it was moving over Guadeloupe Island on September 27, 1966
