= ESSA-7 =

American weather satellite

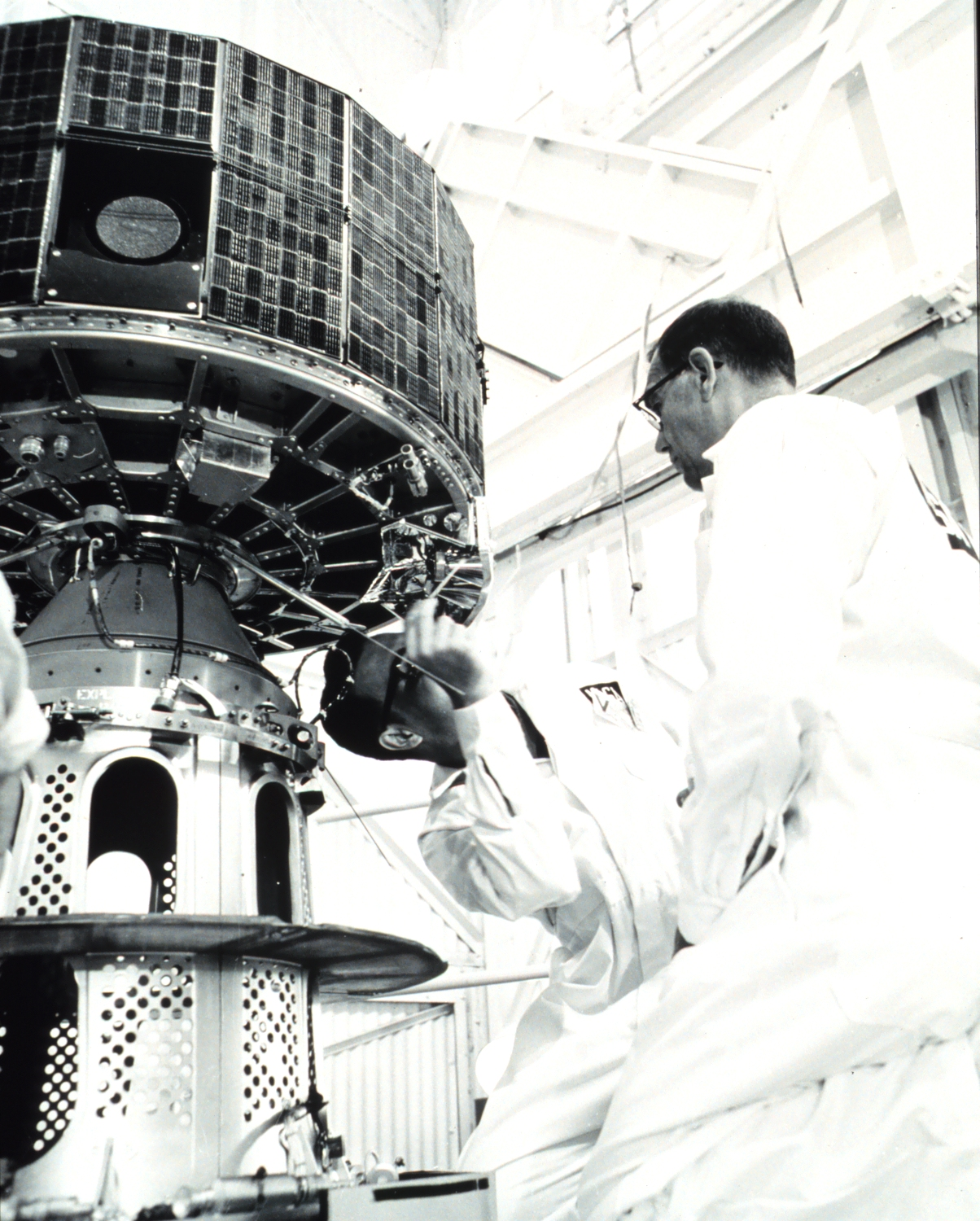
Working on ESSA-7, designated TOS-E prior to launch.

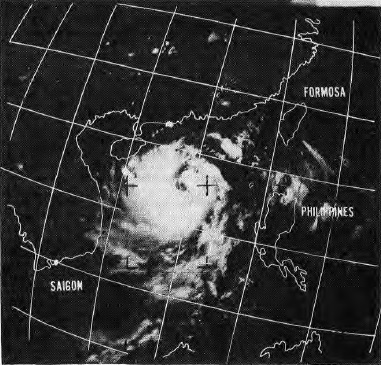
Photo of Tropical Storm Shirley by ESSA-7 VII on August 19, 1968

ESSA-7 (or TOS-E) was a spin-stabilized operational meteorological satellite. Its name was derived from that of its oversight agency, the Environmental Science Services Administration (ESSA).

== Launch ==
ESSA-7 was launched on August 16, 1968, at 11:31 UTC. It was launched atop a Delta rocket from Vandenberg Air Force Base, California, USA. The spacecraft had a mass of 145 kilograms (320 lb) at the time of launch. ESSA-7 had an inclination of 101.72°, and an orbited the Earth once every 114.9 minutes. Its perigee was 1,432 kilometers (890 mi) and its apogee was 1,476 kilometers (917 mi).
