= NOAA-13 =

American weather satellite that failed shortly after launch

- Names: NOAA-I
- Mission type: Weather
- Operator: NOAA
- COSPAR ID: 1993-050A
- SATCAT no.: 22739
- Mission duration: 2 years (planned); 12 days (achieved)

Spacecraft properties
- Spacecraft: TIROS
- Bus: Advanced TIROS-N
- Manufacturer: GE Aerospace
- Launch mass: 1,420 kg (3,130 lb)
- Dry mass: 740 kg (1,630 lb)
- Dimensions: Spacecraft: 3.71 m × 1.88 m (12.2 ft × 6.2 ft); Solar array: 2.37 m × 4.91 m (7 ft 9 in × 16 ft 1 in)

Start of mission
- Launch date: 9 August 1993, 10:02:00 UTC
- Rocket: Atlas-E Star-37S-ISS (Atlas S/N 34E)
- Launch site: Vandenberg, SLC-3W
- Contractor: Convair

End of mission
- Disposal: Early satellite failure
- Last contact: 21 August 1993

Orbital parameters
- Reference system: Geocentric orbit
- Regime: Sun-synchronous orbit
- Perigee altitude: 860 km (530 mi)
- Apogee altitude: 876 km (544 mi)
- Inclination: 98.90°
- Period: 102.0 minutes
Instruments
- AVHRR/2: Advanced Very High Resolution Radiometer
- TOVS: TIROS Operational Vertical Sounder
- SEM: Space Environment Monitor
- DCS (Argos): Data Collection System
- SARSAT: Search and Rescue Satellite-Aided Tracking System
- SBUV/2: Solar Backscatter Ultraviolet
- EHIC: Energetic Heavy Ion Composition
- MAXIE: Magnetospheric Atmospheric X-Ray Imaging Experiment

NOAA-13, also known as NOAA-I before launch, was an American weather satellite operated by the National Oceanic and Atmospheric Administration (NOAA). NOAA-I continued the operational, polar orbiting, meteorological satellite series operated by the National Environmental Satellite System (NESS) of the National Oceanic and Atmospheric Administration (NOAA). NOAA-I continued the series (fifth) of Advanced TIROS-N (ATN) spacecraft begun with the launch of NOAA-8 (NOAA-E) in 1983. NOAA-I was in an afternoon equator-crossing orbit and was intended to replace the NOAA-11 (NOAA-H) as the prime afternoon (14:00) spacecraft.

== Launch ==
NOAA-13 was launched on an Atlas E launch vehicle on 9 August 1993 from Vandenberg Air Force Base, SLC-3W.

== Spacecraft ==
The goal of the NOAA/NESS polar orbiting program is to provide output products used in meteorological prediction and warning, oceanographic and hydrologic services, and space environment monitoring. The polar orbiting system complements the NOAA/NESS geostationary meteorological Geostationary Operational Environmental Satellite (GOES) program. The NOAA-I Advanced TIROS-N spacecraft is based on the Defense Meteorological Satellite Program (DMSP) Block 5D spacecraft and is modified version of the TIROS-N spacecraft (NOAA-1 to NOAA-5). The spacecraft structure consists of four components: 1° the Reaction System Support (RSS); 2° the Equipment Support Module (ESM), which has been expanded from the TIROS-N design; 3° the Instrument Mounting Platform (IMP); and 4° the Solar Array (SA).

== Instruments ==
All of the instruments are located on the ESM and the IMP. The spacecraft power is provided by a direct energy transfer system from the single solar array which consists of eight panels of solar cells. The power system for the Advanced TIROS-N has been upgraded from the previous TIROS-N design. The in-orbit Attitude Determination and Control Subsystem (ADACS) provides three-axis pointing control by controlling torque in three mutually orthogonal momentum wheels with input from the Earth Sensor Assembly (ESA) for pitch, roll, and yaw updates. The ADACS controls the spacecraft attitude so that orientation of the three axes is maintained to within ± 0.2° and pitch, roll, and yaw to within 0.1°. The ADACS consists of the Earth Sensor Assembly (ESA), the Sun Sensor Assembly (SSA), four Reaction Wheel Assemblies (RWA), two roll/yaw coils (RYC), two pitch torqueing coils (PTC), four gyros, and computer software for data processing.

The Advanced TIROS-N data handling subsystem, which is only slightly changed from the TIROS-N design to accommodate the additional instruments, consists of the TIROS Information Processor (TIP) for low data rate instruments, the Manipulated Information Rate Processor (MIRP) for high data rate AVHRR, digital tape recorders (DTR), and a cross strap Unit (XSU). The NOAA-13 instrument complement consists of 1° the 5-channel Advanced Very High Resolution Radiometer/2 (AVHRR/2); 2° the TIROS Operational Vertical Sounder (TOVS), which consists of the Stratospheric Sounding Unit (SSU), the Microwave Sounding Unit (MSU) and the High Resolution Infrared Radiation Sounder (HIRS/2); 3° the Solar Backscatter Ultraviolet Radiometer (SBUV/2), which is similar to the SBUV on Nimbus 7 and is only flown on the afternoon orbiters; 4° the Search and Rescue System (SARSAT); 5° the Space Environment Monitor (SEM), which consists of the Total Energy Detector (TED) and the Medium Energy Proton and Electron Detector (MEPED); 6° the French/CNES-provided Argos Data Collection System (DCS); and two experimental sensors sponsored by the Office of Naval Research (ONR): 7° Magnetospheric Atmospheric X-ray Imaging Experiment (MAXIE); and 8° the Energetic Heavy Ion Composition Experiment (EHIC).

=== Advanced Very High Resolution Radiometer (AVHRR/2) ===
The AVHRR/2 was a five-channel scanning radiometer capable of providing global daytime and nighttime sea-surface temperature and information about ice, snow, and clouds. These data were obtained on a daily basis for use in weather analysis and forecasting. The multispectral radiometer operated in the scanning mode and measured emitted and reflected radiation in the following spectral intervals: channel 1 (visible), 0.55 to 0.90 micrometer (μm); channel 2 (near-IR), 0.725 μm to detector cutoff around 1.100 μm; channel 3 (IR window), 10.5 to 11.5 μm; channel 4 (IR window), 3.55 to 3.93 μm; and channel 5, 11.5 to 12.5 μm. All five channels had a spatial resolution of 1.1 km, and the two IR-window channels had a thermal resolution of 0.12 Kelvin at 300 Kelvin. The AVHRR/2 was made up of five modules: scanner modules, electronics modules, radiant cooler, optical system, and baseplate. The scanner module included an 80-pole hysteresis synchronous motor housing and a scan mirror. The scan motor continuously rotated the mirror at 360 rpm for cross-track scanning. The electronic module included systems for data processing, temperature control, telemetry, scan and motor logic. The radiant cooler consisted of four components. Its primary function was to shade the radiator surface and to operate the heater to maintain temperature control. The optical system consisted of a 20.3 cm aperature telescope and secondary optics which separated the radiant energy into spectral bands. The AVHRR/2 operated in either real-time or recorded modes. Real-time or direct readout data were transmitted to ground stations both at low (4 km) resolution via Automatic Picture Transmission (APT) and at high (1 km) resolution via High-Resolution Picture Transmission (HRPT). Data products included "global area coverage" (GAC) data at a resolution of 4 km, and "local area coverage" (LAC) data, which contained data from selected portions of each orbit at a 1 km resolution. Identical experiments were flown on other spacecraft in the TIROS-N/NOAA series.

=== TIROS Operational Vertical Sounder (TOVS) ===
The TOVS on NOAA-13 consisted of three instruments: the High-resolution Infrared Radiation Sounder modification 2 (HIRS/2), the Stratospheric Sounding Unit (SSU), and the Microwave Sounding Unit (MSU). All three instruments were designed to determine radiances needed to calculate temperature and humidity profiles of the atmosphere from the surface to the stratosphere (approximately 1 mb).

The HIRS/2 instrument had 20 channels in the following spectral intervals: channels 1 through 5, the 15-micrometer (μm) CO_{2} bands (15.0, 14.7, 14.5, 14.2, and 14.0 μm); channels 6 and 7, the 13.7- and 13.4-μm CO_{2}/H_{2}O bands; channel 8, the 11.1-μm window region; channel 9, the 9.7-μm ozone band; channels 10, 11, and 12, the 6-μm water vapor bands (8.3, 7.3, and 6.7 μm); channels 13 and 14, the 4.57-μm and 4.52-μm N_{2}O bands; channels 15 and 16, the 4.46-μm and 4.40-μm CO_{2}/N_{2}O bands; channel 17, the 4.24-μm CO_{2} band; channels 18 and 19, the 4.0-μm and 3.7-μm window bands; and channel 20, the 0.70-μm visible region. For NOAA-I AND NOAA-J, channel 10 and 17 operate at 12.25 and 4.13 μm, respectively. Resolution for all channels is 17.4 km at nadir. The HIRS/2 instrument provides data for calculations of temperature profiles from the surface to 10 mb, water vapor content at three levels of the atmosphere, and total ozone content. HIRS/2 was made up of a scan system, optics, radiant cooler and detectors, electronics and data handling, and mechanical systems. The HIRS/2 scan mirror was stepped in synchrone with the spacecraft clock. The mirror was stepped in 1.8° steps acquiring data at 56 data points. The optical system consisted of two field stops: one for longwave and another for shortwave radiation. The instrument bandpass was defined by filters located on a filter wheel behind each field stop. A relay lens system focused the radiation on the detectors. The radiant cooler maintained temperature control for the thermal channels.

The second instrument, the SSU, is provided by United Kingdom. The SSU measured temperature profiles in the upper atmosphere from 25 to 50 km in altitude. It had three channels that operated at 669.99, 669.63, and 669.36 per cm using three pressure-modulated cells containing CO_{2} (at 100, 35 and 10 mb) to accomplish selective bandpass filtration of the sampled radiance. The SSU consisted of a single telescope with a 10° IFOV that was step scanned perpendicular to the subpoint track. Each scan line was composed of 8 individual 4-second steps. The SSU used uncooled pyroelectric detectors that integrated the radiance in each channel for 3.6 seconds during each step. A single 8-cm scan mirror was used for all three channels. The SSU detector was a flake of tri-glycine sulphate attached to the end of a conical gold-plated nickel pipe. The exit aperature of the pipe defined the illuminated area on the flake, and the input end of the pipe defined the field of view (FOV). The three detectors were mounted on a common block. The SSU was calibrated in synchronism with HIRS/2 once every 8 scans.

The third instrument, the MSU, had four channels operating in the 50- to 60-GHz oxygen band (50.31, 53.73, 54.96 and 57.95 GHz) which obtained vertical temperature profiles free of cloud interference to an altitude of about 20 km. The MSU, developed by Jet Propulsion Laboratory (JPL), was a 4-channel Dicke radiometer and consisted of two scanning reflector antenna systems, orthomode transducers, four Dicke receivers, data programmer, and power supplies. The antennas scanned 47.4° on either side in 11 steps. Microwave energy received by each antenna was separated into vertical and horizontal polarization components by an orthomode transducer and each of the four signals was fed into one of the radiometer channels. The MSU was used along with HIRS/2 to remove data ambiguities caused by clouds. The same experiments are flown on other spacecraft in the TIROS-N/NOAA series.

=== Argos Data Collection and Location System (DCS) ===
The Argos Data Collection and Location System (DCS) on NOAA-13 was designed to obtain low-duty-cycle transmissions of meteorological observations from free-floating balloons, ocean buoys, other satellites, and fixed ground-based sensor platforms distributed around the globe. These observations were organized on board the spacecraft and retransmitted when the spacecraft came within range of a Command and Data Acquisition (CDA) station. For free-moving balloons, the Doppler frequency shift of the transmitted signal was observed to calculate the location of the balloons. The DCS consisted of three components: terrestrial platforms, on-board instruments, and the processing center. On-board receivers obtain transmitted signals at 401.65 MHz. Four processing channels, Data Recovery Units (DRU), operated in parallel. Each DRU consisted of a phase lock loop, bit synchronizer, doppler counter, and a data formatter. After measurement of the doppler frequency, sensor data were formatted with other instrument data, and the output data transferred to a buffer interface with the spacecraft data processor. Data from the DCS was included with the low bit rate instruments on NOAA-13. Data was processed at the Argos Data Processing Center of CNES in Toulouse, France. The DCS was expected to have a location accuracy of 5 to 8 km, and a velocity accuracy of 1.0 to 1.6 m/s. This system had the capability of acquiring data from up to 2000 platforms per day. Identical experiments are flown on other spacecraft in the TIROS-N / NOAA series.

=== Space Environment Monitor (SEM) ===
The (SEM) experiment was an extension of the solar-proton monitoring experiment (SPM) flown on the ITOS spacecraft series. The objective was to measure proton flux, electron flux density, and energy spectrum in the upper atmosphere. The experiment package consisted of two detector systems and a data processing unit. The two components were: the Total Energy Detector (TED) and the Medium Energy Proton and Electron Detector (MEPED). The medium energy proton and electron detector (MEPED) measured protons in five energy ranges from 30 keV to >60 MeV; electrons above 30, 100, and 300 keV; protons and electrons (inseparable) above 6 MeV; and omni-directional protons above 16, 36, and 80 MeV. The MEPED consisted of four directional, solid-state detector telescopes and an omni-directional sensor. The output from the detectors were connected to a signal analyzer which sensed and logically selected events above threshold values. The total energy detector (TED) measured the intensity of protons and electrons between 300 eV and 20 keV. The instrument consisted of a curved plate analyzer and a channeltron detector. Four curved plate analyzers measured incoming protons and electrons.

=== Search and Rescue Satellite Aided Tracking (SARSAT) ===
The Search and Rescue Satellite Aided Tracking system (SARSAT-COSPAS) was an international communications system for relaying search and rescue messages from ships and aircraft in distress. Cooperating organizations included NOAA, the Russian Merchant Marine, Canada Department of Defense and communications industries, and CNES/France. SARSAT equipment was provided by Canada and France to be flown on NOAA POES and on Russian polar orbiting satellites (COSPAS or "System for Search of Vessels in Distress"). The SARSAT-COSPAS system consisted of both space and ground components. The SARSAT system elements were: 1) a space-based receiver, frequency translation repeater (provided by the Department of Communications, Canada) for both existing and experimental Emergency Locator Transmitter (ELT)/Emergency Position Indicating Radio Beacons (EPIRB) bands; 2) a Local User Terminal (LUT) which received the ELT/EPIRB signals and processed the doppler data to Earth locate the transmitting platform; 3) operational and experimental ELT and EPIRB systems; 4) a space-based receiver and processor for the experimental (406 MHz) ELT/EPIRB transmissions (provided by CNES, France); and 5) the Mission Control Centers for coordinating activities, processing global data and coordinating search activities. Data from the 121.5-MHz ELTs, the 243-MHz EPIRBs, and experimental 406-MHz ELTs/EPIRBs were received by the Search and Rescue Repeater (SARR) and broadcast in real time on an L-band frequency (1544.5 MHz). Real-time data were monitored by Local User Terminals (LUTs) operating in many countries (including United States, Canada, France, and Russia). The 406-MHz data were also processed by the Search and Rescue Processor (SARP), and stored on the spacecraft for later transmittal to the CDA stations in Alaska and Virginia, thus providing full global coverage. The distress signals were forwarded to Mission Control Centers located in each country for subsequent relay to the appropriate Rescue Coordination Center.

=== Solar Backscatter Ultraviolet Radiometer (SBUV/2) ===
The SBUV/2 was designed to provide the vertical distribution of ozone in the Earth's atmosphere. The instrument design was based upon the technology developed for the SBUV/TOMS flown on the Nimbus 7. The SBUV/2 instrument measured backscattered solar radiation in an 11.3° field of view in the nadir direction at 12 discrete, 1.1 nm wide, wavelength bands between 252.0 and 339.8 nm. The solar irradiance was determined at the same 12 wavelength bands by deploying a diffuser that reflected sunlight into the instrument field of view. The SBUV/2 also measured the solar irradiance or the atmospheric radiance with a continuous spectral scan from 160 nm to 400 nm in increments nominally 0.148 nm. The SBUV/2 had another narrowband filter photometer channel, called the Cloud Cover Radiometer (CCR), which continuously measured the Earth's surface brightness at 380 nm. The CCR field-of-view had the size of 11.3°. The SBUV/2 instrument was made up of two components: the electronics module and the sensor/detector modules. The Earth viewing sensors were mounted on the exterior of the Equipment Support Module (ESM) while the electronics modules were located inside the ESM. The components of the sensor module were a scanning double monochromator, a cloud cover radiometer, a diffuser plate, and detectors. The SBUV/2 operated in five modes: Discrete Mode (DM) which sequentially measured scene radiance and solar spectral irradiance in 12 discrete bands; Sweep Mode (SM) which measures the spectral band pass from 160 to 400 nm in a continuous manner; Wavelength Calibration Mode (WCM) which is the same as discrete mode but only the calibration lamps were scanned; Monochromator Stop Mode (MSM), which interrupted the spectral scan mode; and the Monochromator Caged Mode (MCM), where the Monochromator was stored in a predetermined position.

=== Energetic Heavy Ion Composition (EHIC) ===
The EHIC experiment flown on NOAA-13 measured the chemical and isotopic composition of energetic particles between hydrogen and nickel over the energy range of 0.5 to 200 MeV/nucleon. The experiment measured energetic particles produced by solar flares in the Earth's polar regions and measured trapped energetic particles in the magnetosphere.

=== Magnetospheric Atmospheric X-Ray Imaging Experiment (MAXIE) ===
The MAXIE flown on NOAA-13 mapped the intensities and energy spectra of X-rays produced by precipitating electrons in the atmosphere of Earth.

== Mission ==
NOAA-13 lost communications shortly after launch and no data was collected. Just 12 days later, on 21 August 1993, a short circuit occurred that prevented the solar array from charging the satellite's batteries. Later investigation determined the short circuit was due to a screw that extended too far below an aluminum plate designed to dissipate heat, improperly making contact with a radiator plate that carried current. NOAA-13 satellite experienced a "full battery discharge" and shut down because of this battery failure.

== See also ==
- NOAA-10
- NOAA-12
- NOAA-14
