= TIROS-I =

TIROS-I may refer to:

- TIROS-1, the first TIROS satellite
- TIROS-9, the ninth TIROS satellite
