= Television Infrared Observation Satellite =

Series of early NASA weather satellites

Television InfraRed Observation Satellite
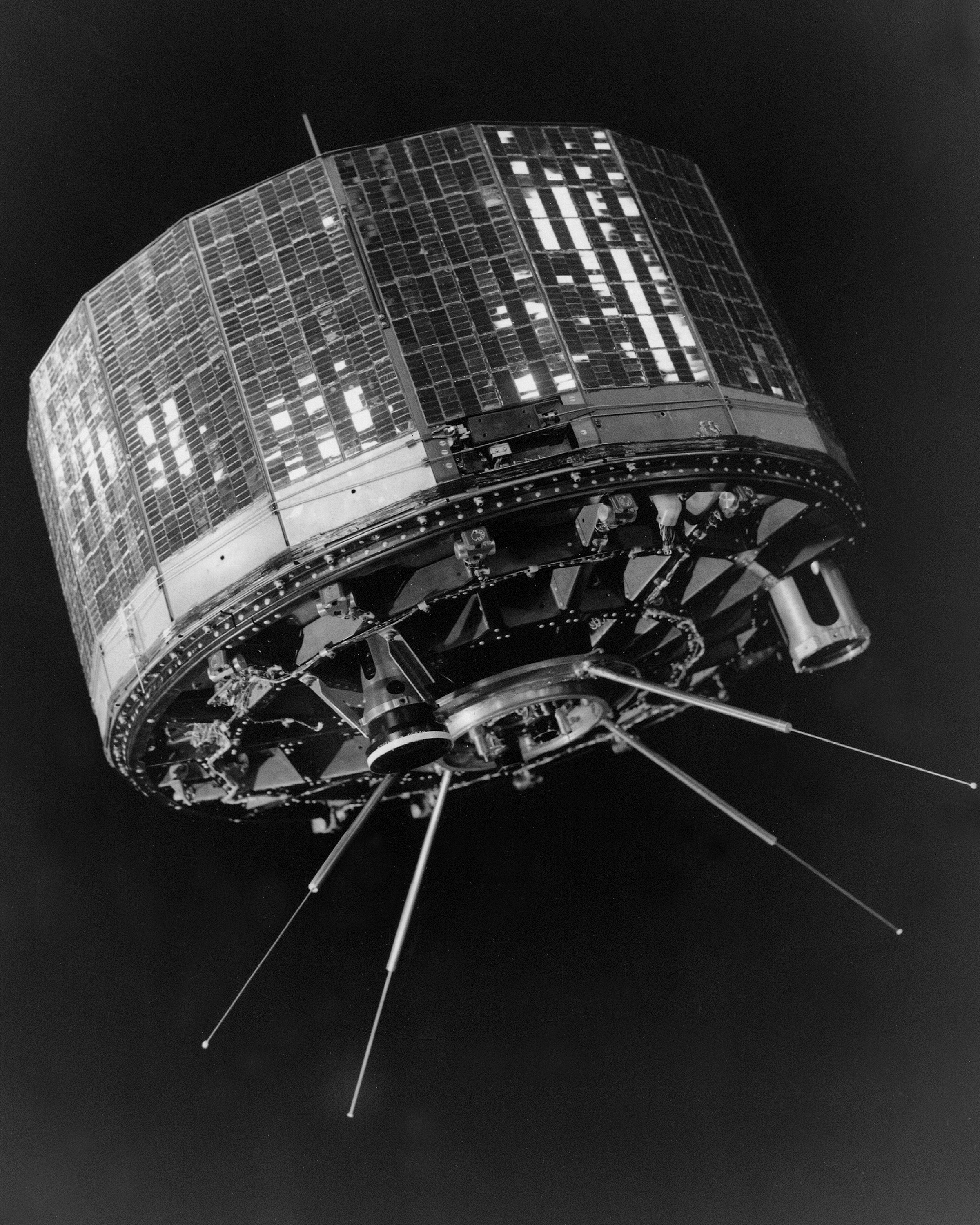
- TIROS 6 satellite
- Manufacturer: RCA Astrospace; Lockheed Martin
- Country of origin: United States
- Operator: NASA
- Applications: Meteorology

Specifications
- Bus: TIROS
- Regime: Low Earth orbit

Production
- Launched: 45
- Lost: 4

Television InfraRed Observation Satellite (TIROS) is a series of early weather satellites launched by the United States, beginning with TIROS-1 in 1960. TIROS was the first satellite that was capable of remote sensing of the Earth, enabling scientists to view the Earth from a new perspective: space. The program, promoted by Harry Wexler, proved the usefulness of satellite weather observation, at a time when military reconnaissance satellites were secretly in development or use. TIROS demonstrated at that time that "the key to genius is often simplicity". TIROS is an acronym of "Television InfraRed Observation Satellite" and is also the plural of "tiro" which means "a young soldier, a beginner".

The Advanced Research Projects Agency (now DARPA) initiated the TIROS program in 1958 and transferred the program to the National Aeronautics and Space Administration (NASA) in 1959. Participants in the TIROS program also included, United States Army Signal Research and Development Laboratory, Radio Corporation of America (RCA), the United States Weather Bureau Service, the United States Naval Photographic Interpretation Center (NPIC), the Environmental Science Services Administration (ESSA), and the National Oceanic and Atmospheric Administration (NOAA).

== History ==
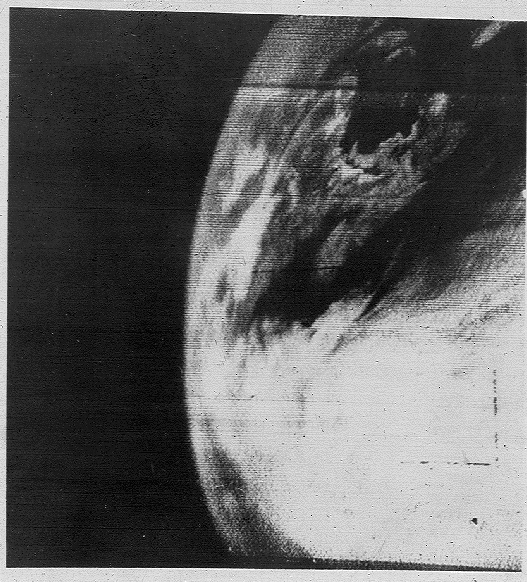
One of the first TV images of Earth from space, taken by TIROS-1 in April 1960

The TIROS project emerged from early efforts examining the feasibility of surveillance from space for meteorology and intelligence gathering which began in the U.S. as early as the late 1940s. The Radio Corporation of America conducted a study for the RAND Corporation in 1951, concluding that a spaceborne television camera could provide worthwhile information for general reconnaissance. In 1956, the RCA received funding from the U.S. Army to develop a reconnaissance satellite program, initially called Janus, under the administration of the Army Ballistic Missile Agency (ABMA). The project remained under the administration of ABMA but was transferred to the Advanced Research Projects Agency (ARPA, now DARPA) in 1958. The contract called for the development of a spacecraft to be launched using the Jupiter-C launch vehicle, which was eventually revised to the Juno II launch vehicle. Janus and Janus II, prototype satellites without directional stability and a single onboard camera, were built as part of the project. In May 1958, a committee chaired by William Welch Kellogg of the RAND Corporation with representatives from the U.S. Armed Forces, the U.S. Weather Bureau, the National Advisory Committee for Aeronautics, and the RCA was convened to discuss a satellite meteorological program and design objectives. The committee recommended that such a program should provide observations of cloud cover with television cameras at coarser and finer resolutions, accompanied by infrared measurements of Earth's radiation; the goal of the first meteorological satellites would be to trial experimental television techniques, validate sun- and horizon-based sensors for spacecraft orientation, and collect meteorological data.

While Janus was in development, Herbert York, the Director of Defense Research and Engineering, moved Department of Defense reconnaissance satellites out of the purview of the U.S. Army. With meteorological satellites flagged as a high-priority requirement by the U.S. government, the RCA shifted the goals of the Janus project towards meteorological applications, whose relaxed resolution requirements for cameras enabled smaller and lighter satellite systems. Accordingly, the resolution of the television cameras planned for Janus was lowered, relying on off-the-shelf refractive optics rather than the more sophisticated systems originally planned. The U.S. Army also granted an ARPA request to develop a larger launch vehicle for larger satellites, allowing the RCA to change the Janus design to a larger spin-stabilized spacecraft. The Janus project was renamed to Television Infrared Observation Satellite (TIROS) following the changes and the project was declassified.

Development of the TIROS satellite payload was contracted to the Army Signal Corps Laboratories and $3.6 million was allocated to Air Force Systems Command for use of the Thor launch vehicle. Before signing the National Aeronautics and Space Act that created the National Aeronautics and Space Administration (NASA), President Dwight D. Eisenhower determined that NASA should handle meteorological satellite development. Edgar Cortright, the ARPA committee overseeing the TIROS project, arranged the transfer of TIROS to NASA's Goddard Space Flight Center on April 13, 1959. The acquisition of the TIROS project from ARPA by NASA was seen as a means to provide good publicity and validate the existence of the nascent civilian agency. The agency treated the project as an experimental testbed rather than as an operational aid or as a platform for taking scientific observations. The United States Weather Bureau and Department of Defense Weather Services favored operational use of early TIROS data. This tension led to the formation of the Panel on Operational Meteorological Satellites, an interagency group, in October 1960 to ascertain the objectives of an operational meteorological satellite program.

The initial TIROS mission design called for three satellites. Each satellite was to carry a two-lens optical television system built by the RCA, an improved infrared scanning system drawn from the Vanguard 2 spacecraft, and a radiometer developed by Verner E. Suomi to measure Earth's energy budget. However, only the optical system was included in the first TIROS payload, TIROS-1, launched on April 1, 1960, as the first U.S. satellite to carry a television camera. The originally planned instruments were included in the subsequent launches of TIROS-2, TIROS-3, and TIROS-4 over the following two years.

Despite the early success of TIROS, early difficulties with handling TIROS data and political pressure to develop an operational weather satellite system based around a second spacecraft in development, Nimbus. However, delays and the high cost of the Nimbus program ultimately led to TIROS-based spacecraft serving as the United States' fleet of operational weather satellites. The second generation of TIROS satellites, designated as ESSA, fulfilled this role as the TIROS Operational System (TOS) beginning in 1966. Nine ESSA satellites were launched during 1966–1969. The odd-numbered ESSA satellites provided meteorological data to national meteorological services while television images from the even-numbered ESSA satellites could be received from simple stations globally through an Automated Picture Transmission (APT) system. A third generation of TIROS satellites, named the Improved TIROS Operational System (ITOS), was developed and launched in the 1970s, combining the capabilities of the two types of ESSA satellites and serving in an operational capacity. Unlike the preceding TIROS generations, the ITOS spacecraft featured three-axis stabilization. Later ITOS satellites included additional instruments and improved versions of the preceding instruments, including the Very High Resolution Radiometer.

In 1978, RCA completed the first spacecraft in the TIROS-N series, the fourth generation of TIROS satellites. These offered a new suite of instruments including the Advanced Very-High-Resolution Radiometer (AVHRR). Later TIROS-N satellites, beginning with NOAA-E in 1983, had higher data-handling capacity and carried new instruments on a slightly larger spacecraft bus; these satellites were collectively known as Advanced TIROS-N (ATN). NOAA-N Prime (later designated NOAA-19) was the last spacecraft in the TIROS series, launching in February 2009.

== Series ==
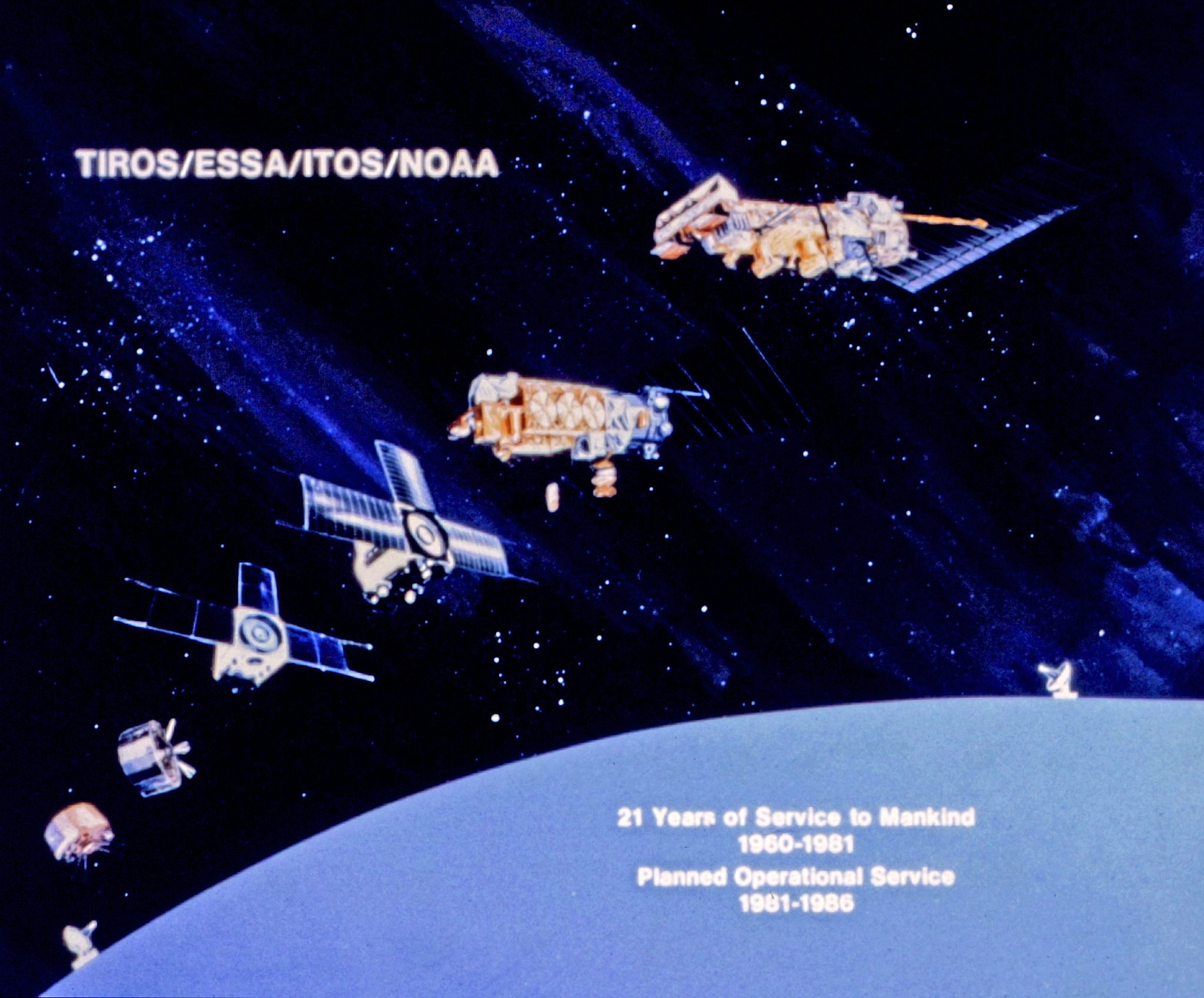
Diagram showing progression of meteorological satellites from TIROS I to TIROS-N

TIROS continued as the more advanced TIROS Operational System (TOS), and eventually was succeeded by the Improved TIROS Operational System (ITOS) or TIROS-M, and then by the TIROS-N and Advanced TIROS-N series of satellites. NOAA-N Prime (NOAA-19) is the last in the TIROS series of NOAA satellites that observe Earth's weather and the environment.

The naming of the satellites can become confusing because some of them use the same name as the over-seeing organization, such as "ESSA" for TOS satellites overseen by the Environmental Science Services Administration (for example, ESSA-1) and "NOAA" (for example, NOAA-M) for later TIROS-series satellites overseen by the National Oceanic and Atmospheric Administration.

=== First generation (1960–1965) ===
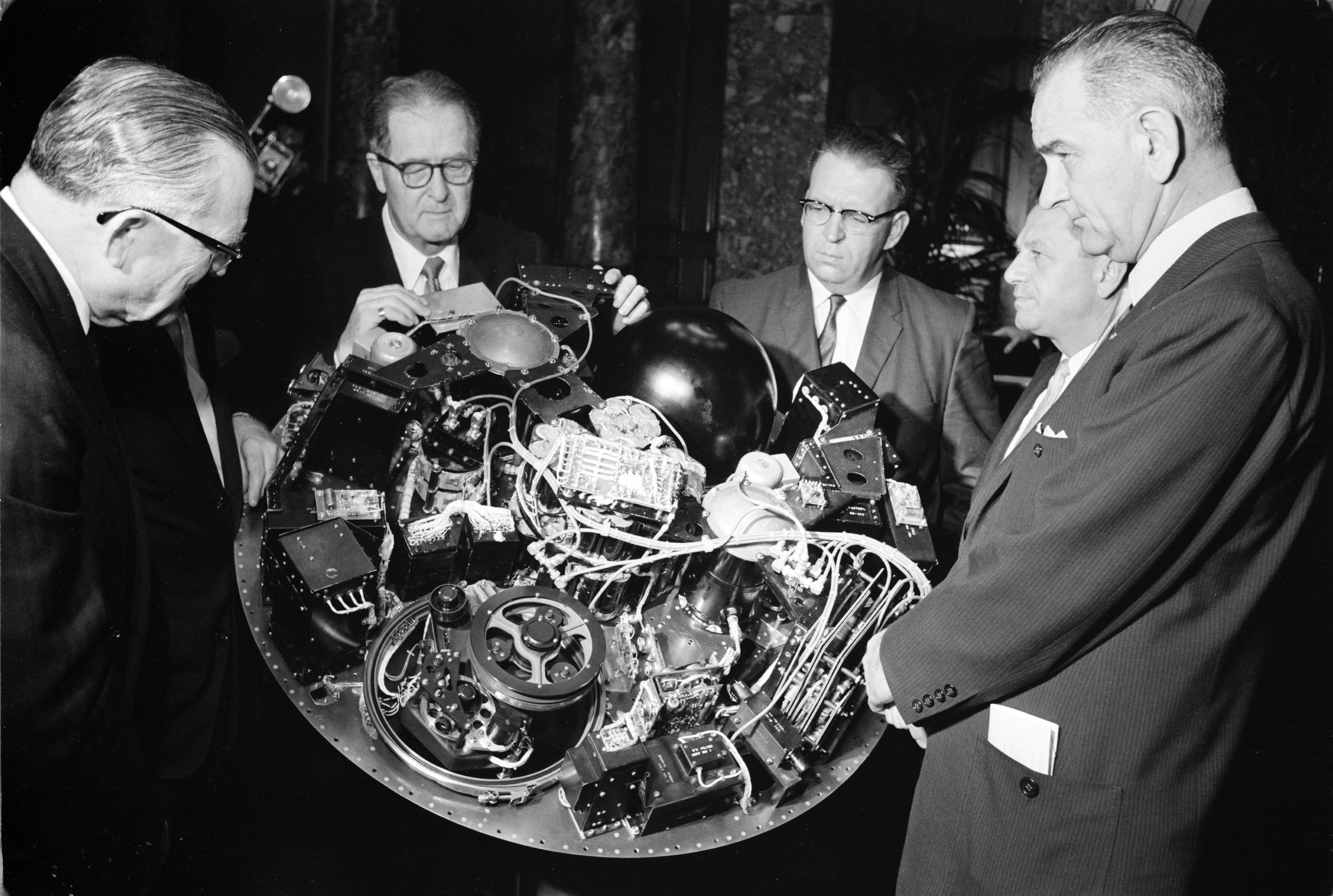
William G. Stroud displaying TIROS-I's circuitry to Lyndon B. Johnson on 4 April 1960.

The first ten TIROS satellites, beginning with the launch of TIROS-1 in 1960 and ending with the launch of TIROS-10 in 1965, were polar orbiting spacecraft developed and operated under the aegis of NASA. Each spacecraft had design lifetimes of six months, with a new spacecraft launch every six months. The primary goal of the first TIROS satellites was to trial the use of spaceborne television camera systems for imaging cloud cover. During the first generation, the scope of the TIROS project evolved from an initially experimental to a semi-operational stature. Following TIROS-1, the engineering and mission design of successive TIROS spacecraft were intended to resolve shortcomings observed in earlier iterations.

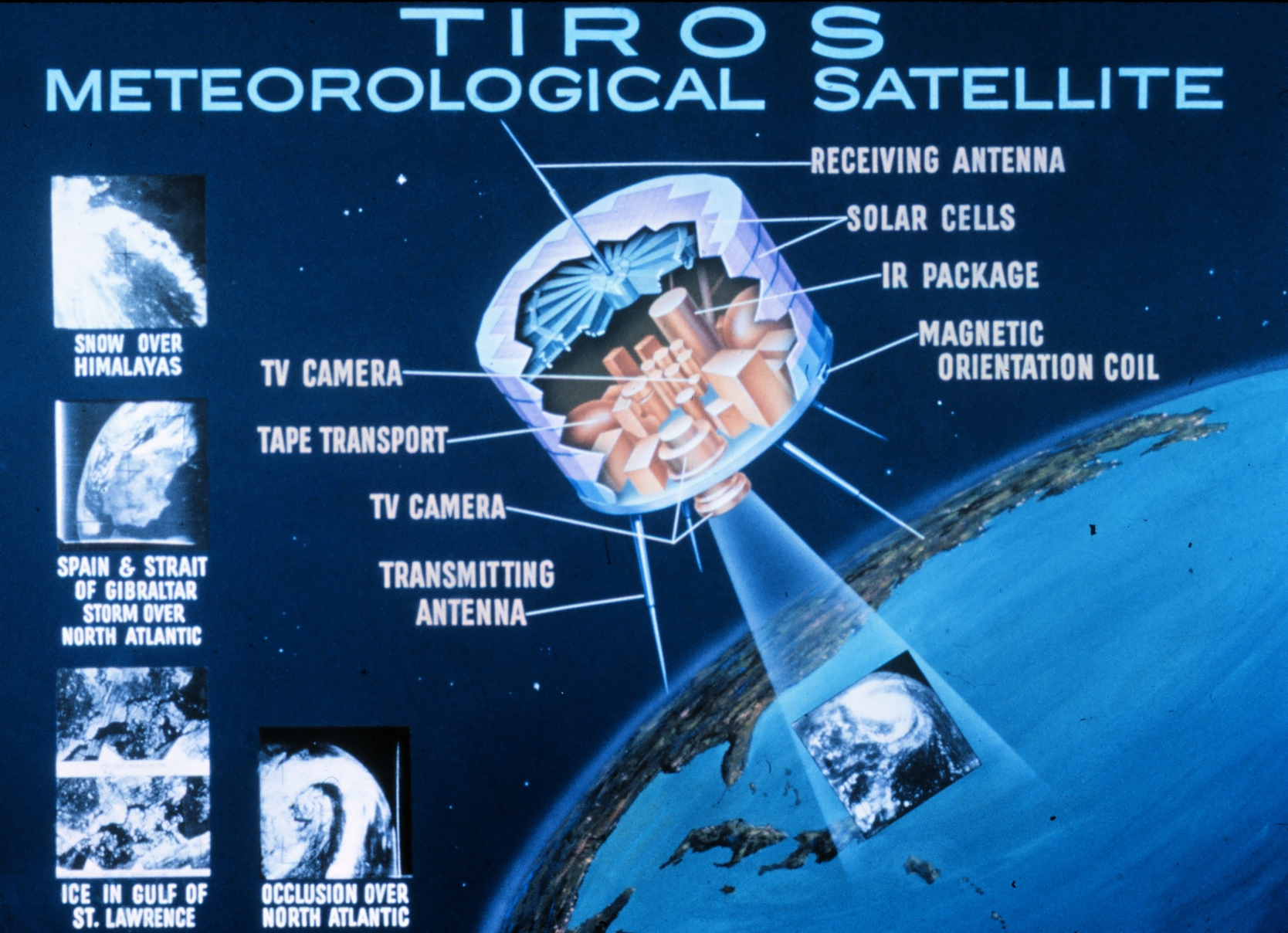
TIROS meteorological satellite system showing components and photoproducts

The spacecraft bus for the first generation of TIROS spacecraft were drum-shaped 18-sided right prisms spanning about 42 in (1,100 mm) in diameter and 19 in (480 mm) in height. Made of aluminum alloy and stainless steel, each spacecraft weighed around 270 lb (120 kg). The satellites were powered by nickel–cadmium batteries, which in turn were charged by 9,200 solar cells mounted throughout the sides of the spacecraft. The TIROS spacecraft were designed to spin at 8–12 rpm to maintain spin stabilization. Pairs of solid-propellant rockets mounted on the base plate of the instrument housing could be fired one pair at a time to increased the rotation rate by 3 rpm to counteract degradation in the spin rate. The cameras on the first eight TIROS satellites were also located on the base plate and aligned parallel to the spacecraft's axis of rotation. The lack of attitude control on the first generation of TIROS meant that Earth was only in the field of view of the cameras for a portion of the satellite orbit, with the satellite holding a fixed orientation relative to space for its entire service lifetime by design. Interaction with Earth's magnetic field caused the axis of rotation of TIROS-1 to oscillate. A magnetorquer was introduced on TIROS-2 and maintained through TIROS-8 to allow 1.5° changes in the spacecraft attitude per orbit by gradually varying the spacecraft's own magnetic field. A more robust magnetic system, named the Quarter Orbit Magnetic Attitude Control System, was introduced on TIROS-9, allowing for quicker and finer attitude control and enabling changes in the spacecraft spin axis by up to 10°. The cameras on TIROS-9 were affixed radially on the sides of the spacecraft rather than the base plate. This "wheel" configuration, in contrast to the "axial" configuration of the preceding TIROS spacecraft, allowed more frequent imagery of the Earth.

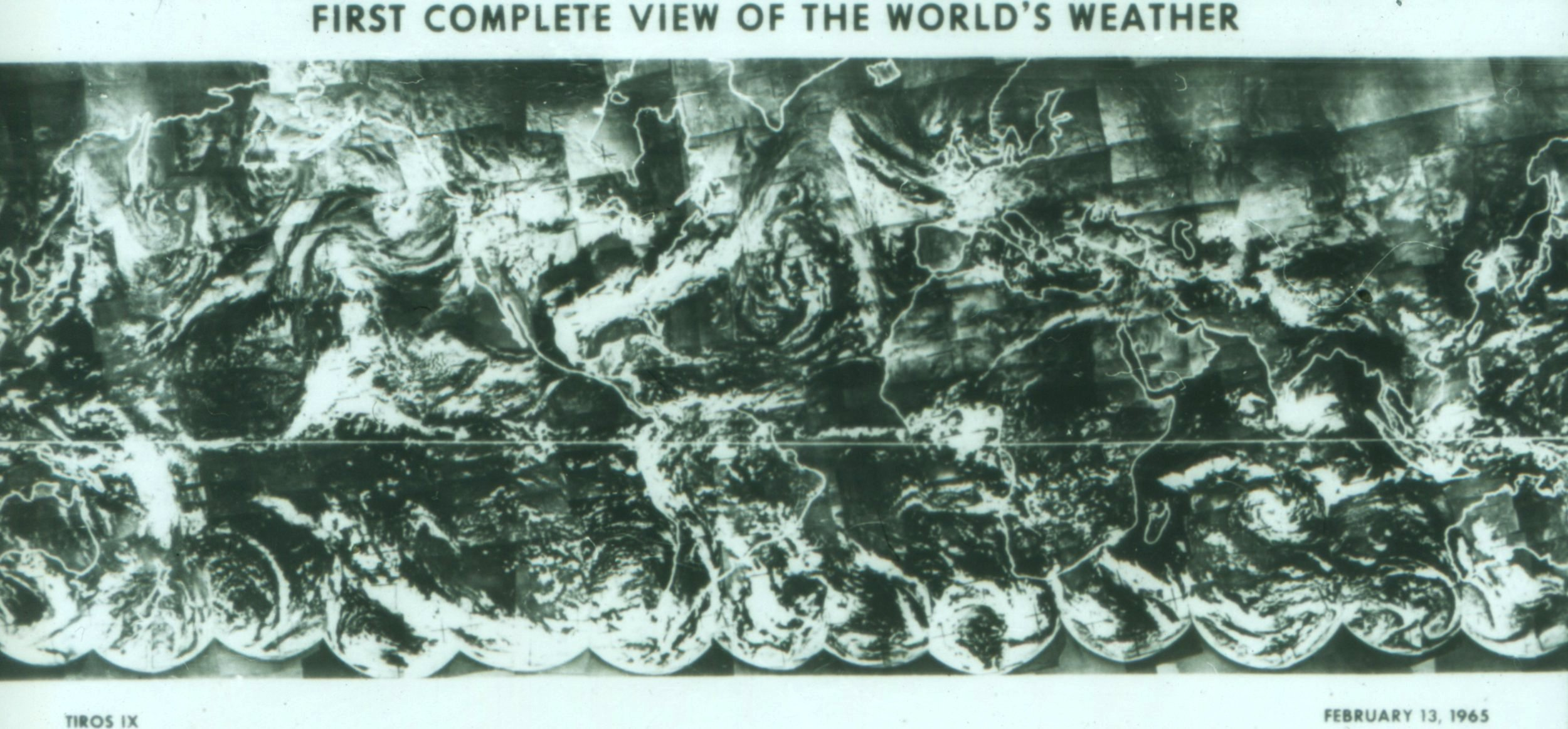
Improvements to spacecraft and mission design allowed for more complete views of the Earth beginning with TIROS-9.

The first generation of TIROS satellites carried two 0.5 in (13 mm) diameter Vidicon line-scan cameras, typically with different fields of view supporting different angular resolution. The magnetic tape recorder on early iterations of TIROS could store a total of 64 pictures taken at fixed 30-second intervals, equivalent to at most two orbits of data. Imaging capacity was increased to 96 pictures beginning with TIROS-9, and implementation of a clock system enabled for variable intervals between images. The camera shutters made possible the series of still pictures that were stored and transmitted back to earth via 2-watt FM transmitters as the satellite approached one of its ground command points. After transmission, the tape was erased or cleaned and readied for more recording. TIROS-8 served as a test run of the new APT system, allowing images to be readily broadcast and received without dependence on onboard storage. Subsequent TIROS spacecraft maintained the APT system accompanied by improvements to both the onboard system and expansion of the ground station network. Some of the early TIROS spacecraft also included a five-channel medium resolution infrared scanning radiometer and a low resolution radiometer. The five-channel radiometer allowed for observations of both daytime and nighttime cloud cover. Data were transmitted via four antennas protruding from the spacecraft base plate, with a single receiving antenna mounted at the center of the top plate.

Each of the first ten TIROS missions were planned to take circular Sun-synchronous orbits with an altitude of about 400 nmi (740 km; 460 mi); over-performance of the second stage of TIROS-9's launching system resulted in the errant placement of that spacecraft in an elliptical orbit. The first four TIROS satellites were launched into circular orbits with an inclination of 48° with respect to the equator, providing coverage of the Earth between 55°N and 55°S. Concurrent improvements in the Thor-Delta launch vehicle selected for the TIROS program permitted increases in the orbital inclination of later payloads. The following four satellites from TIROS-5 through TIROS-8 had a higher inclination of 58°, expanding satellite coverage to 65°N–65°S. TIROS-9 and TIROS-10 achieved full coverage of the Earth's daylight side with near-polar orbital inclinations of 98° with respect to the equator. The orientations of the first eight TIROS satellites and their orbits constrained the observable portion of Earth's sunlit side, relying on orbital precession over the course of several months to cover areas in both the Northern and Southern hemispheres.

- TIROS-1 (A): launched on 1 April 1960, suffered electrical system failure on 15 June 1960
- TIROS-2 (B): launched on 23 November 1960, failed on 22 January 1961
- TIROS-3 (C): launched on 12 July 1961, deactivated on 28 February 1962
- TIROS-4 (D): launched on 8 February 1962, failed on 30 June 1962 (both cameras failed earlier)
- TIROS-5 (E): launched on 19 June 1962, failed on 13 May 1963
- TIROS-6 (F): launched on 18 September 1962, failed on 21 October 1963
- TIROS-7 (G): launched on 19 June 1963, deactivated on 3 June 1968
- TIROS-8 (H): launched on 23 December 1963, deactivated on 1 July 1967
- TIROS-9 (I): launched on 22 January 1965, failed on 15 February 1967. First Tiros satellite in near-polar orbit
- TIROS-10 (OT-1): launched on 2 July 1965, deactivated on 1 July 1967.

As of June 2014, all TIROS satellites launched between 1960 and 1965 (with the exception of TIROS-7 and TIROS-2) were still in orbit.

=== TIROS Operational System ===
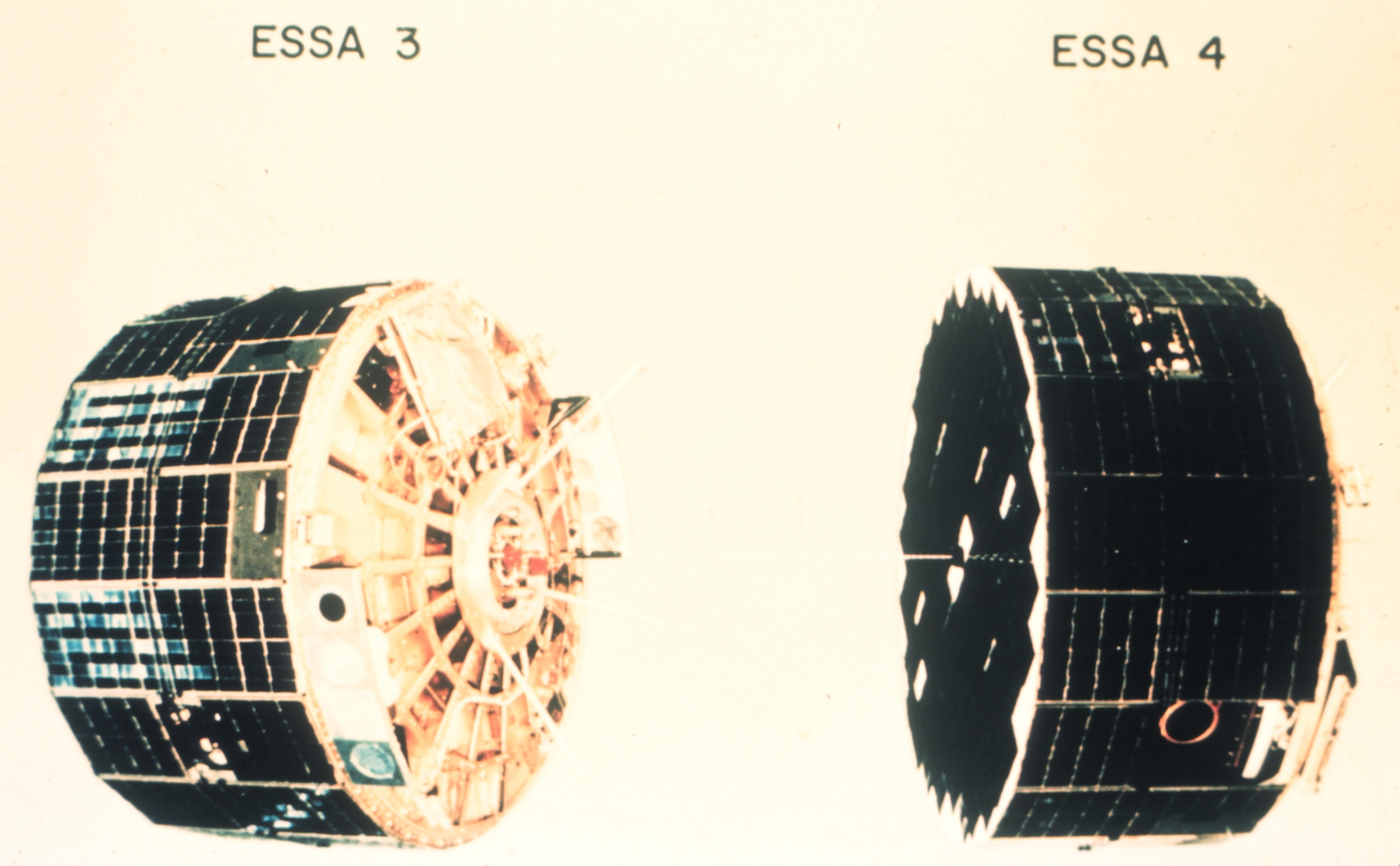
- ESSA-3 and 4, satellites of the TIROS Operational System.
  ESSA-1 (OT-3)
- ESSA-2 (OT-2)
- ESSA-3 (TOS-A)
- ESSA-4 (TOS-B)
- ESSA-5 (TOS-C)
- ESSA-6 (TOS-D)
- ESSA-7 (TOS-E)
- ESSA-8 (TOS-F)
- ESSA-9 (TOS-G)

=== ITOS/TIROS-M ===
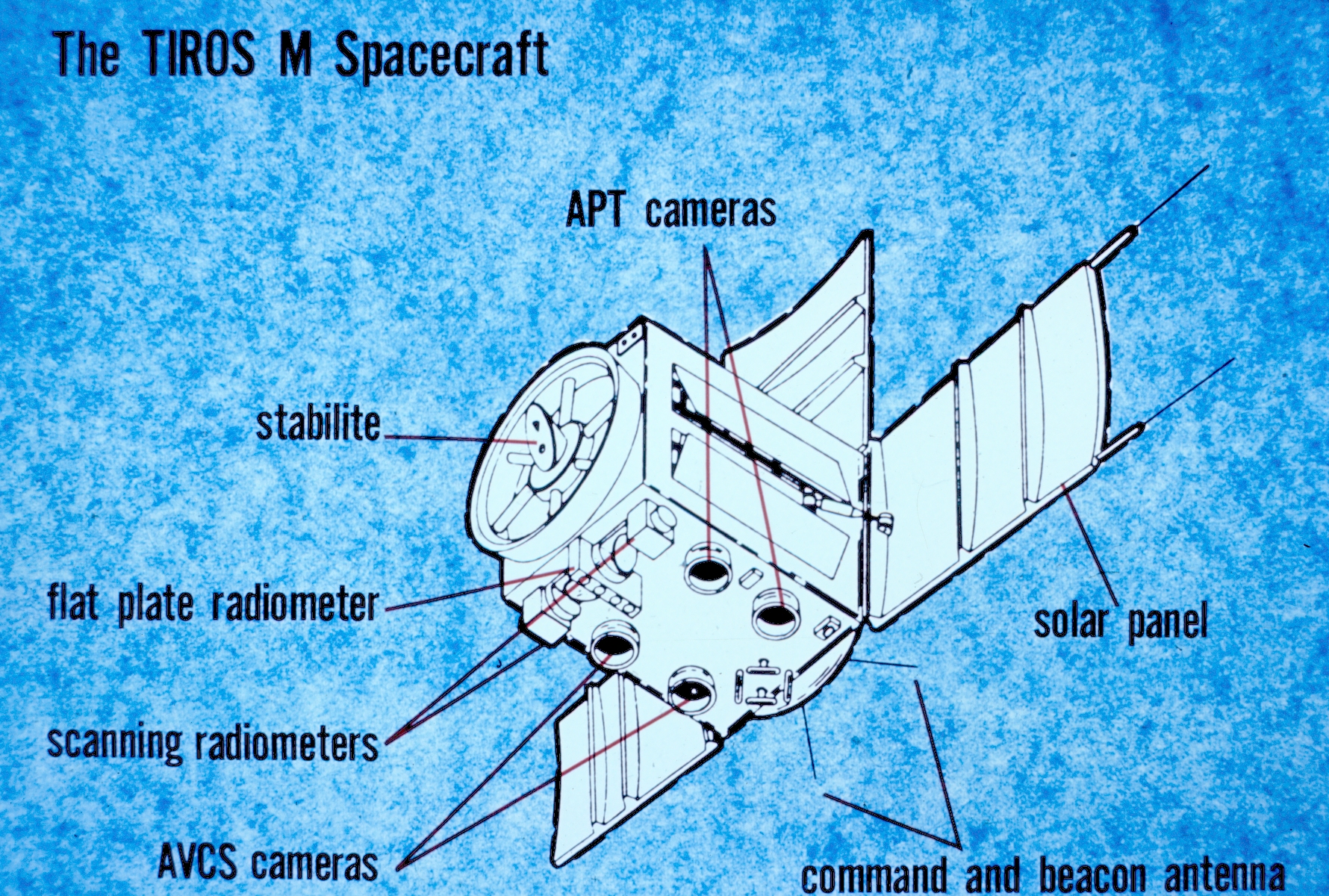
- TIROS-M diagram
  TIROS-M (ITOS-1): launched on 23 January 1970
- NOAA-1 (ITOS-A): launched on 11 December 1970
- ITOS-B launched on 21 October 1971, unusable orbit
- ITOS-C
- NOAA-2 (ITOS-D): launched on 15 October 1972
- ITOS-E launched on 16 July 1973, failed to orbit
- NOAA-3 (ITOS-F): launched on 6 November 1973
- NOAA-4 (ITOS-G): launched on 15 November 1974
- NOAA-5 (ITOS-H): launched 29 July 1976

=== TIROS-N ===
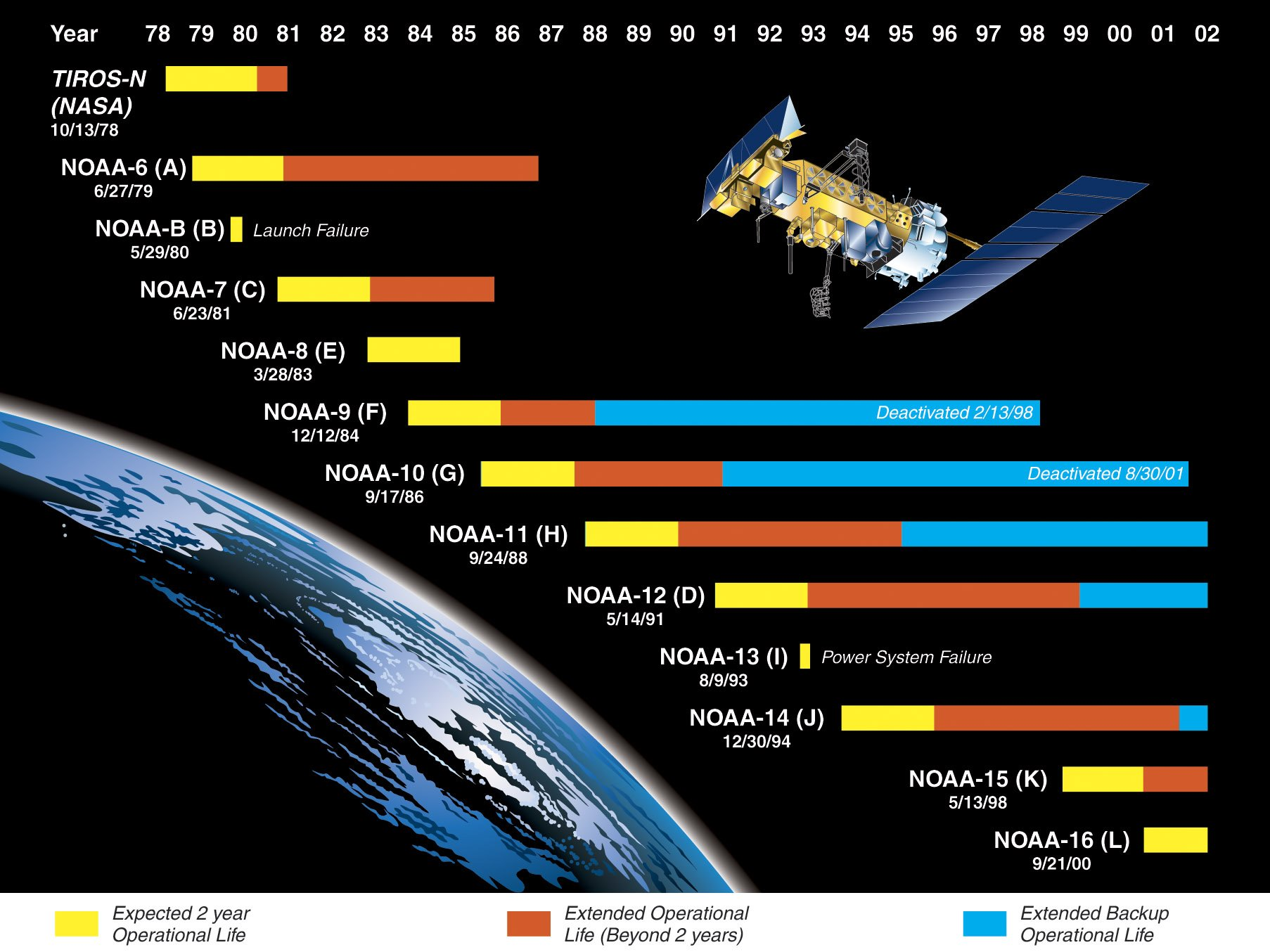
Graphic of the operational life of various satellites of the TIROS-N design

- TIROS-N (Proto-flight): Launched 13 October 1978 into a 470-nmi orbit; deactivated on 27 February 1981.
- NOAA-6 (NOAA-A prior to launch): Launched 27 June 1979 into a 450-nmi orbit. The HIRS, a primary mission sensor, failed 19 September 1983. The satellite exceeded its two-year designed lifetime by almost six years when deactivated on 31 March 1987.
- NOAA-B: Launched 29 May 1980. It failed to achieve a usable orbit because of a booster engine anomaly.
- NOAA-7 (C): Launched 23 June 1981 into a 470-nmi orbit; deactivated June 1986.
- NOAA-12 (D): Launched 14 May 1991 into a 450-nmi AM orbit, out of sequence (see below). Placed in standby mode on 14 December 1998, when NOAA-15 became operational and deactivated on 10 August 2007, setting an extended lifetime record of over sixteen years.

=== Advanced TIROS-N ===
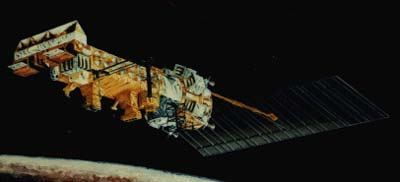
Design of the satellite NOAA-9 in space.

The Advanced TIROS-N (ATN) spacecraft were similar to the NOAA-A through -D satellites, apart from an enlarged Equipment Support Module to allow integration of additional payloads. A change from the TIROS-N through NOAA-D spacecraft was that spare word locations in the low bit rate data system TIROS Information Processor (TIP) was used for special instruments such as the Earth Radiation Budget Satellite (ERBE) and SBUV/2. The search and rescue (SAR) system became independent, utilizing a special frequency for transmission of data to the ground.

- NOAA-8 (E): Launched 28 March 1983 into a 450 nmi (830 km; 520 mi) orbit, out of sequence (before NOAA-D) to get the first SAR system on a US satellite operational. Deactivated 29 December 1985, following a thermal runaway which destroyed a battery.
- NOAA-9 (F): Launched 12 December 1984 into 470 nmi "afternoon" orbit and was the first satellite to carry an SBUV/2 instrument. It was deactivated on 1 August 1993 but was reactivated three weeks later, after the failure of NOAA-13. The SARR transmitter failed on 18 December 1997 and the satellite was permanently deactivated on 13 February 1998.
- NOAA-10 (G): Launched 17 September 1986 into a 450 nmi "morning" orbit. Placed in standby mode on 17 September 1991 (when NOAA-12 became operational) and deactivated on 30 August 2001.
- NOAA-11 (H): Launched 24 September 1988 into a 470 nmi PM orbit. Placed in standby mode in March 1995 and was reactivated in May 1997 to provide soundings after an HIRS anomaly on NOAA-12. Decommissioned 16 June 2004.
- NOAA-13 (I): Launched 9 August 1993 into a 470 nmi PM orbit; two weeks after launch the spacecraft suffered a catastrophic power system anomaly. Attempts to contact or command the spacecraft were unsuccessful.
- NOAA-14 (J): Launched 30 December 1994 into a 470 nmi PM orbit and decommissioned 23 May 2007 after more than twelve years of operation.
- NOAA-15 (K): Launched 13 May 1998 into a 450 nmi morning orbit and replaced NOAA-12 on 14 December 1998, as the primary AM spacecraft. Now secondary, with MetOp-B as the AM primary. Decommissioned 19 August 2025.
- NOAA-16 (L): Launched 21 September 2000 into a 470-nmi afternoon orbit; replaced NOAA-14 on 19 March 2001, as the primary AM spacecraft. Decommissioned on 9 June 2014 due to major spacecraft anomaly.
- NOAA-17 (M): Launched 24 June 2002 into a 450 nmi AM orbit and decommissioned 10 April 2013.
- NOAA-18 (N): Launched 20 May 2005 into a 470 nmi afternoon orbit and replaced NOAA-16 as the PM primary spacecraft on 30 August 2005. Decommissioned on 6 June 2025
- NOAA-19 (N Prime): Launched 6 February 2009 into a 470 nmi afternoon orbit and replaced NOAA-18 as the PM primary spacecraft on 2 June 2009. Decommissioned on 13 August 2025 after a battery failure.
