= TIROS-7 =

NASA weather satellite

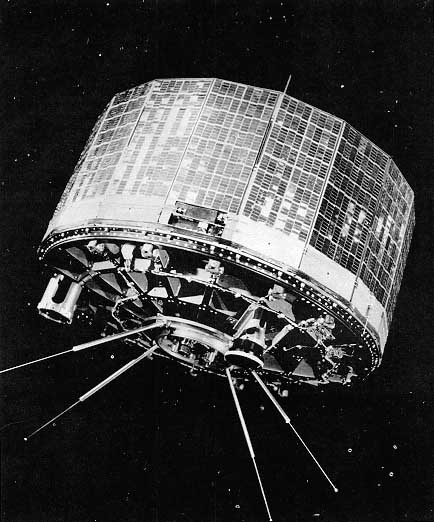
- TIROS-7 satellite.
- Mission type: Weather satellite
- Operator: NASA
- COSPAR ID: 1963-024A
- SATCAT no.: 604
- Mission duration: Normal operation: 1326 days Engineering data: 1812 days

Spacecraft properties
- Spacecraft type: TIROS
- Manufacturer: RCA / GSFC
- Launch mass: 134.7 kilograms (297 lb)
- Dimensions: 1.07 m × 0.56 m (3.5 ft × 1.8 ft)

Start of mission
- Launch date: June 19, 1963, 09:50 UTC
- Rocket: Thor-Delta B 359/D-19
- Launch site: Cape Canaveral LC-17B

End of mission
- Disposal: Natural re-entry
- Deactivated: Weather observation: February 3, 1967; All data deactivated: June 3, 1968
- Decay date: June 3, 1994

Orbital parameters
- Reference system: Geocentric
- Regime: Low Earth
- Eccentricity: 0.001995
- Perigee altitude: 621 kilometers (386 mi)
- Apogee altitude: 649 kilometers (403 mi)
- Inclination: 58.23°
- Period: 97.40 minutes
- Epoch: June 19, 1963

Instruments
- Low Resolution Omnidirectional Radiometer; Scanning Radiometer; Langmuir probe Television Camera System

TIROS-7 (also called TIROS-G or A-52) was a spin-stabilized meteorological satellite. It was the seventh in a series of Television Infrared Observation Satellites.

== Launch ==
TIROS-7 was launched on June 19, 1963, by a Thor-Delta rocket from Cape Canaveral Air Force Station, Florida, United States. The spacecraft functioned nominally until June 3, 1968. It reentered the atmosphere after exactly 26 years on June 3, 1994. The satellite orbited the Earth once every 1 hour and 37 minutes, at an inclination of 58.2°. Its perigee was 621 kilometers (386 mi) and apogee was 649 kilometers (403 mi).

== Mission ==
TIROS 7 was a spin-stabilized meteorological spacecraft designed to test experimental television techniques and infrared equipment. The satellite was in the form of an 18-sided right prism, 107 cm in diameter and 56 cm high. The top and sides of the spacecraft were covered with approximately 9000 1-by 2-cm silicon solar cells. It was equipped with 2 independent television camera subsystems for taking cloudcover pictures, plus an omnidirectional radiometer and a five-channel scanning radiometer for measuring radiation from the earth and its atmosphere. The satellite spin rate was maintained between 8 and 12 rpm by use of five diametrically opposed pairs of small, solid-fuel thrusters.

A magnetic attitude control device permitted the satellite spin axis to be oriented to within 1 to 2 deg of a predetermined attitude. The flight control system also optimized the performance of the solar cells and TV cameras and protected the five-channel infrared radiometer from prolonged exposure to direct sunlight. The spacecraft performed normally until December 31, 1965, and sporadically until February 3, 1967. TIROS-7 was operated for an additional 1.5 years to collect engineering data. It was deactivated on June 3, 1968.

On June 3, 1994, TIROS-7 naturally re-entered the atmosphere and vaporized before reaching the earth's surface.
