= TIROS-M =

Deactivated weather satellite

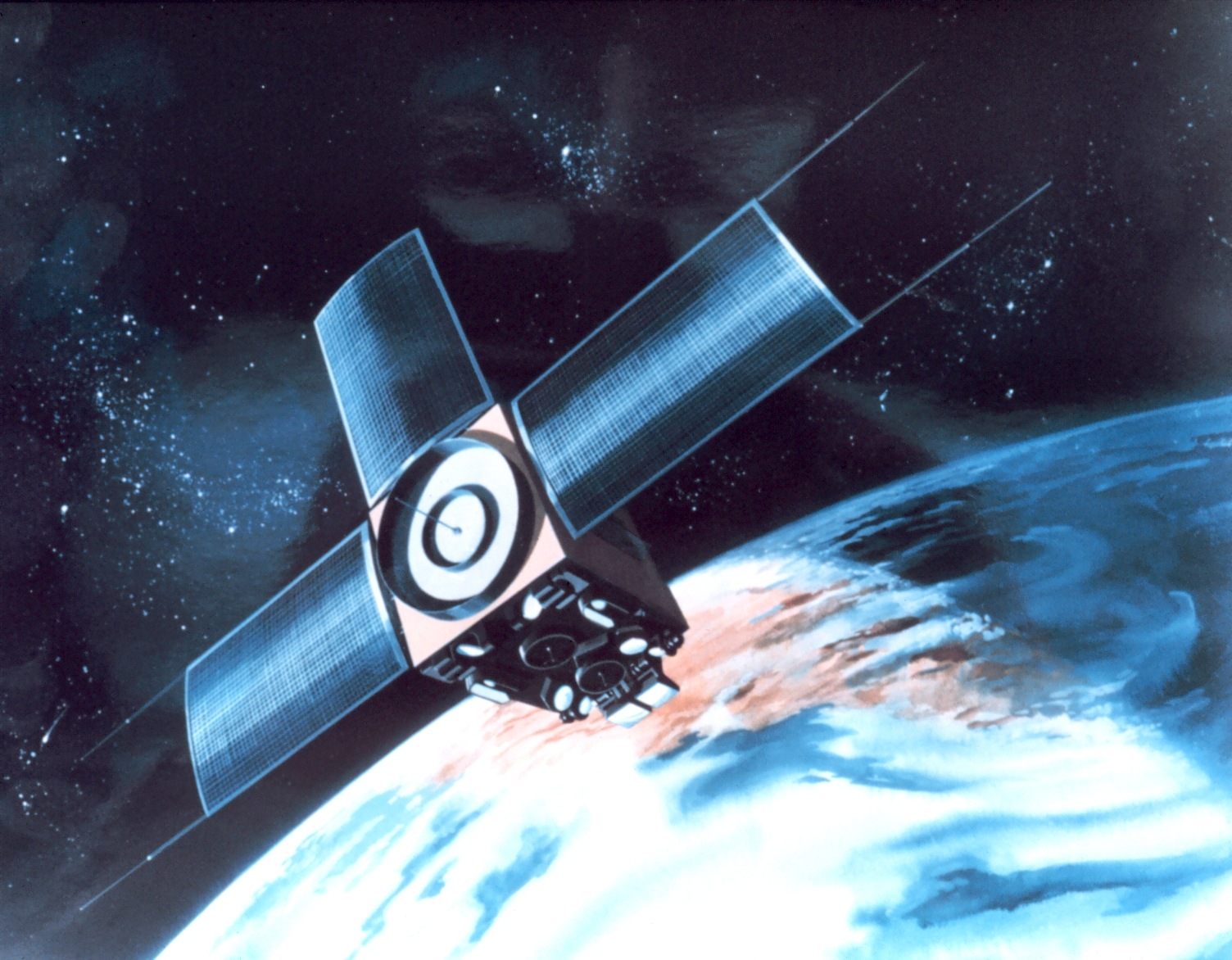
- TIROS-M
- Mission type: Weather
- Operator: ESSA / NASA
- COSPAR ID: 1970-008A
- SATCAT no.: 4320

Spacecraft properties
- Manufacturer: RCA Astro
- Launch mass: 309 kilograms (681 lb)

Start of mission
- Launch date: January 23, 1970, 11:31 UTC
- Rocket: Delta-N6
- Launch site: Vandenberg SLC-2W

End of mission
- Disposal: Decommissioned
- Deactivated: June 18, 1971

Orbital parameters
- Reference system: Geocentric
- Regime: Low Earth; Sun-synchronous
- Perigee altitude: 1,432 kilometers (890 mi)
- Apogee altitude: 1,478 kilometers (918 mi)
- Inclination: 101.99 degrees
- Period: 115 minutes
- Epoch: January 23, 1971

TIROS-M, also known as ITOS-1, was a weather satellite operated by the Environmental Science Services Administration (ESSA). It was part of a series of satellites called ITOS, or improved TIROS. TIROS-M was launched on a Delta rocket on January 23, 1970. The launch carried one other satellite, Australis-OSCAR 5. It was deactivated on June 18, 1971.

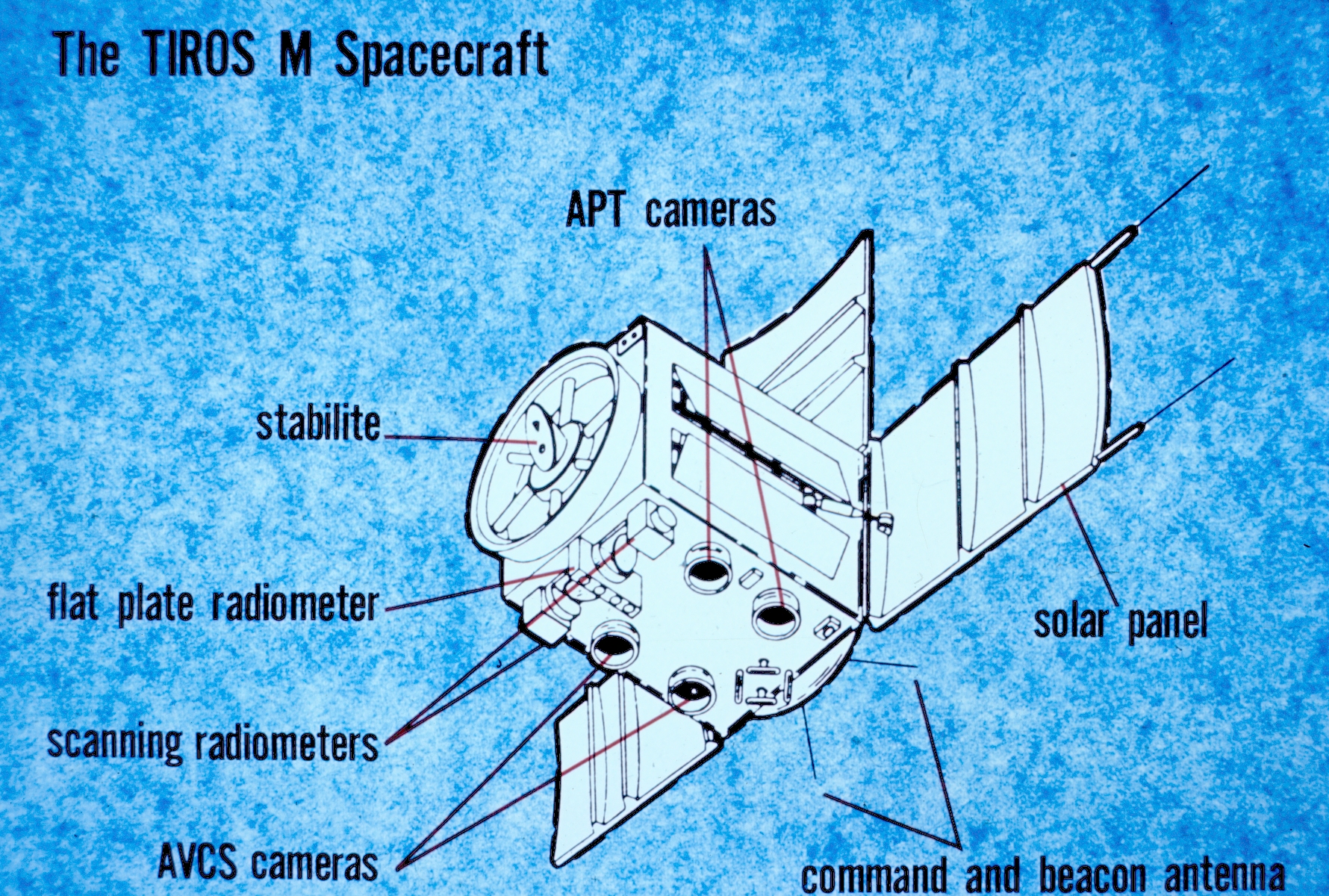
TIROS M diagram

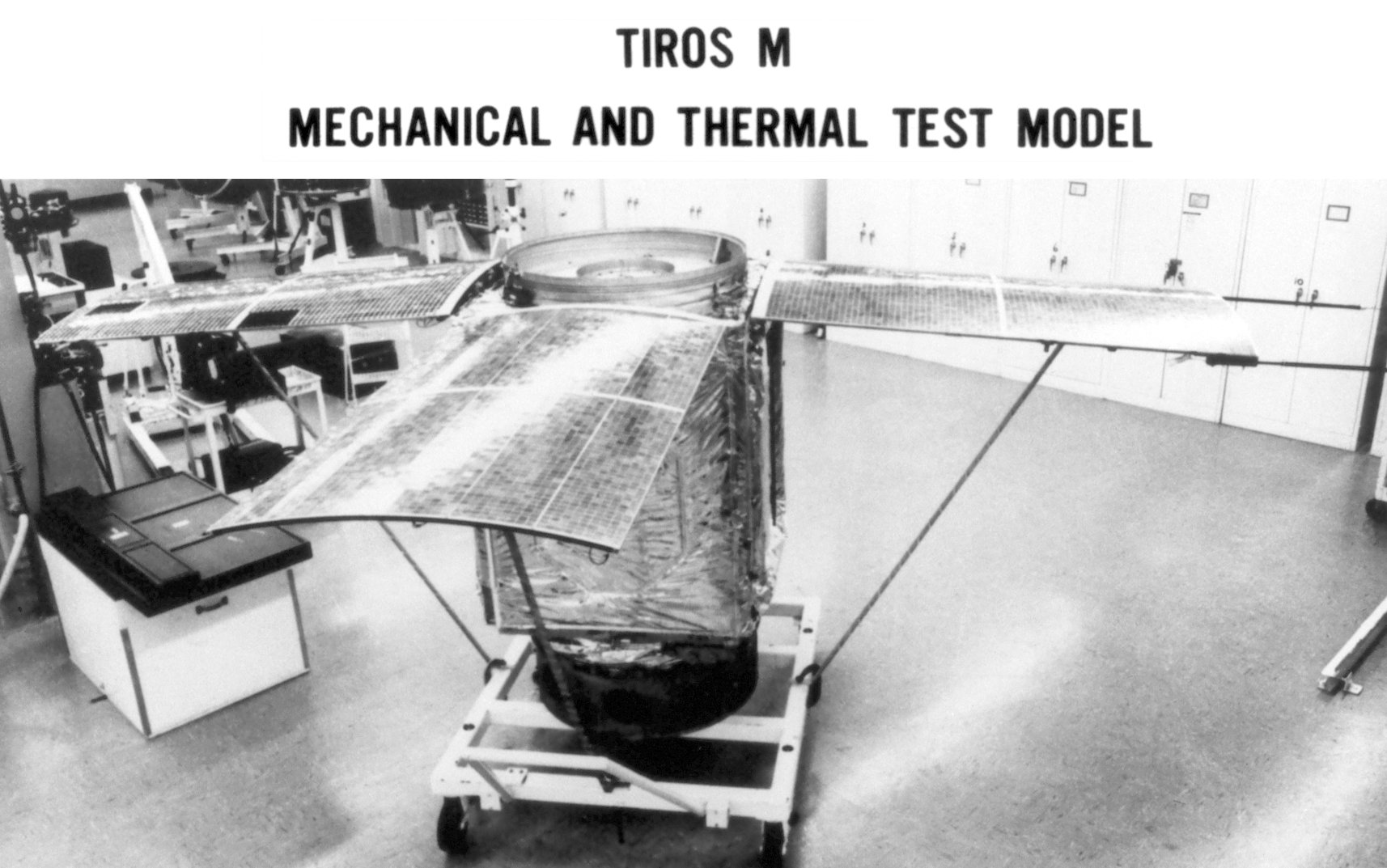
TIROS M mechanical and thermal test model

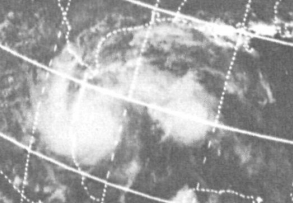
Image of Hurricane Ella prior to its landfall in northeast Mexico from September 11, 1970, taken by ITOS-1

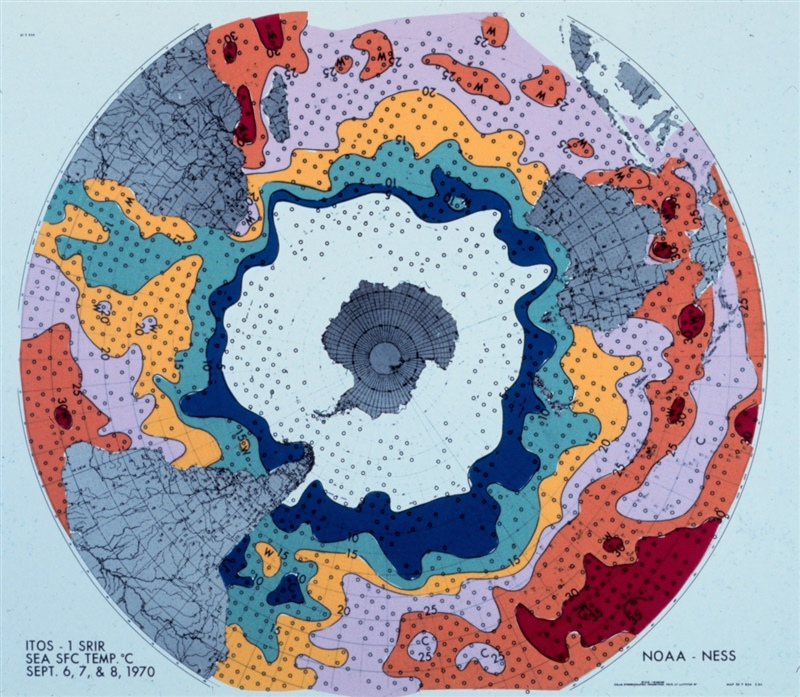
Sea-surface temperature map of the Southern Hemisphere created from ITOS data from September 6–8, 1970
