= TIROS-10 =

NASA weather satellite

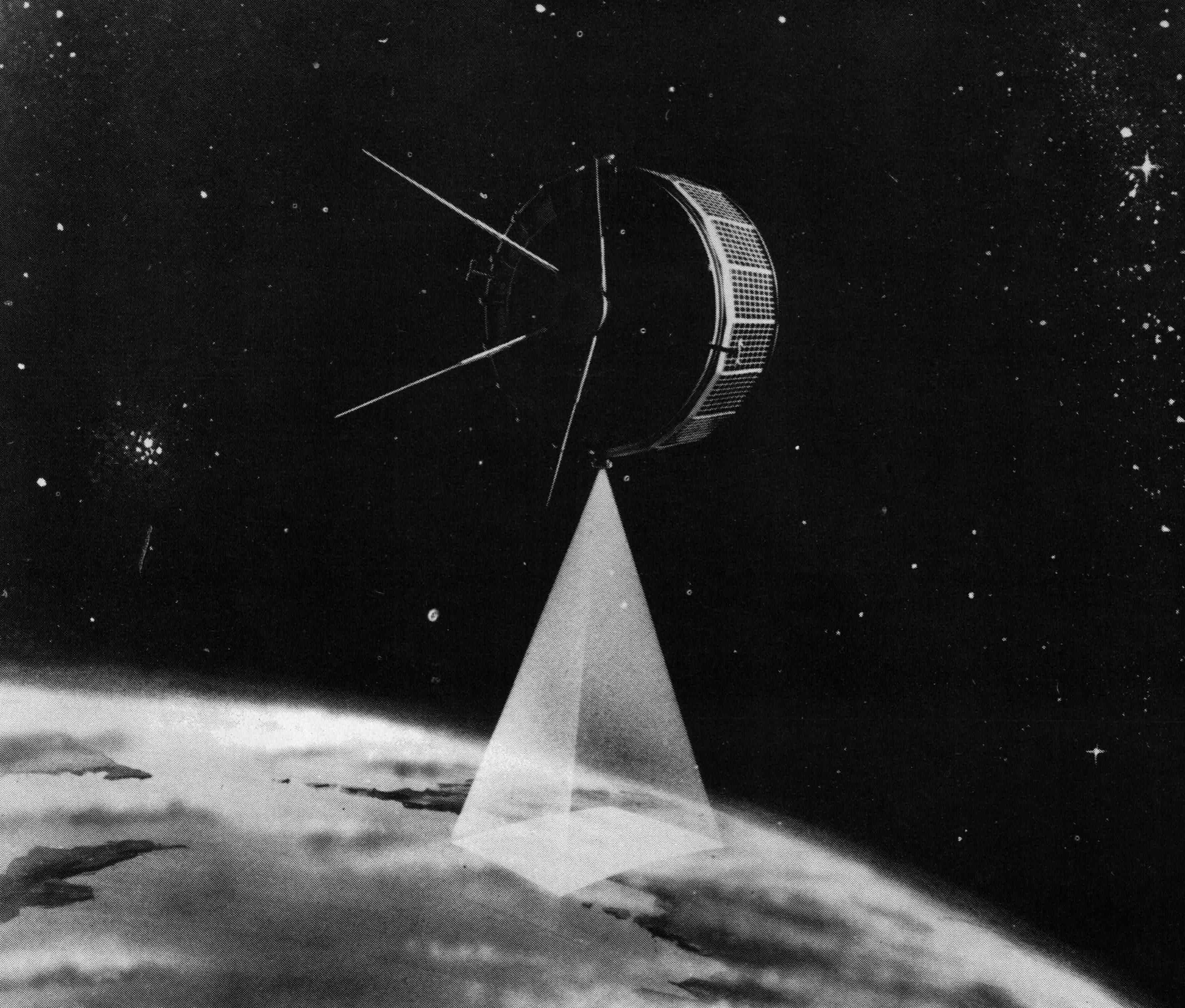
- TIROS-10
- Mission type: Weather satellite
- Operator: NASA
- COSPAR ID: 1965-051A
- SATCAT no.: 1430

Spacecraft properties
- Spacecraft type: TIROS
- Manufacturer: RCA / GSFC
- Launch mass: 138.30 kilograms (304.9 lb)
- Dimensions: 1.07 m × 0.56 m (3.5 ft × 1.8 ft)

Start of mission
- Launch date: July 2, 1965, 04:07 UTC
- Rocket: Thor-Delta C
- Launch site: Cape Canaveral LC-17B

End of mission
- Last contact: July 31, 1966

Orbital parameters
- Reference system: Geocentric
- Regime: Low Earth; Sun-synchronous
- Eccentricity: 0.005991
- Perigee altitude: 751 kilometers (467 mi)
- Apogee altitude: 837 kilometers (520 mi)
- Inclination: 98.65°
- Period: 100.76 minutes
- Epoch: July 2, 1965

Instruments
- Television Camera System

TIROS-10 (also called TIROS OT-1) was a spin-stabilized meteorological satellite. It was the tenth and last in a series of Television Infrared Observation Satellites.

== Launch ==
TIROS-10 was launched on July 2, 1965, by a Thor-Delta rocket from Cape Canaveral Air Force Station, Florida, United States. The spacecraft functioned nominally until July 31, 1966. The satellite orbited the Earth once every 100 minutes, at an inclination of 98°. Its perigee was 751 kilometers (467 mi) and apogee was 837 kilometers (520 mi).

== Mission ==
TIROS 10 was a Sun-synchronous meteorological spacecraft designed to develop improved capabilities for obtaining and using TV cloud cover pictures from satellites and operated as an interim operational satellite. The spin-stabilized spacecraft was in the form of an 18-sided right prism, 107 cm across opposite corners and 56 cm high, with a reinforced baseplate carrying most of the subsystems and a cover assembly. Electric energy was supplied to the spacecraft by approximately 9000 1-by 2-cm silicon solar cells that were mounted on the cover assembly and by 21 nickel-cadmium batteries. A single monopole antenna for reception of ground commands extended from the top of the cover assembly.

A pair of crossed-dipole telemetry antennas (235 MHz) projected down and diagonally out from the baseplate. Mounted around the edge of the baseplate were five diametrically opposed pairs of small solid-fuel thrusters that maintained the satellite spin rate between 8 and 12 rpm. Proper attitude was maintained to within a 1° to 2° accuracy by use of a magnetic control device consisting of 250 coils of wire wound around the outer surface of the spacecraft. The interaction by the induced magnetic field in the spacecraft and the Earth's magnetic field provided the torque necessary for attitude control.

The satellite spin axis could thus be varied while the satellite remained in the conventional TIROS "axial" mode. The satellite was equipped with two identical wide-angle TV cameras with 1.27-cm vidicon for taking earth cloudcover pictures. The pictures could be transmitted directly to either of two ground receiving stations or stored in a tape recorder on board for subsequent playback if the spacecraft was beyond the communication range of the station.

The satellite was launched into a near-polar orbit and successfully provided TV coverage of the entire daylight portion of the Earth. The TV system operated normally until September 30, 1965, and sporadically through July 31, 1966, when the spacecraft was deactivated.
