= ITOS-B =

American weather satellite

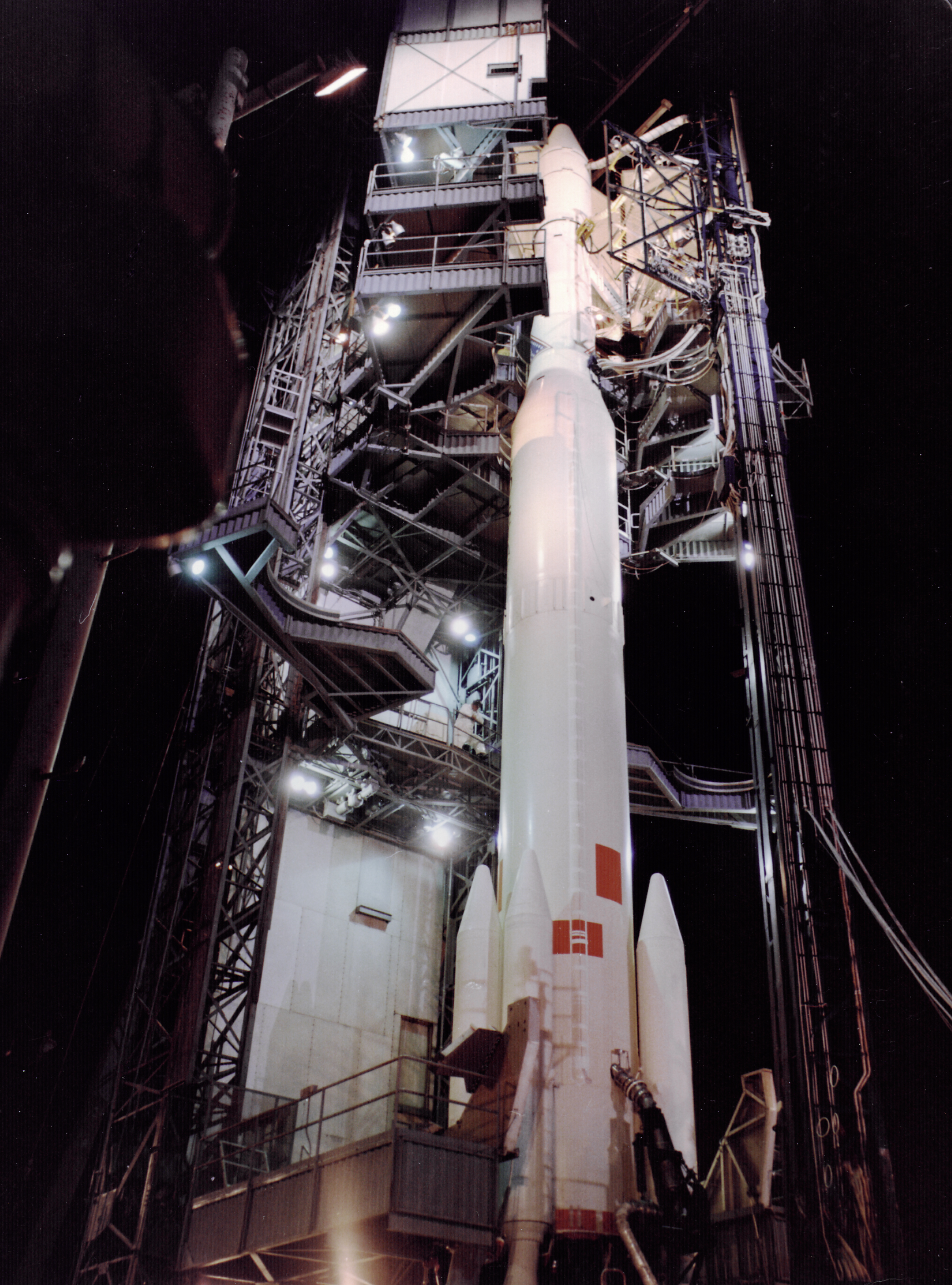
- Delta rocket with ITOS-B.
- Mission type: Weather
- Operator: NOAA
- COSPAR ID: 1971-091A
- Mission duration: Launch failure

Spacecraft properties
- Manufacturer: RCA Astro
- Launch mass: 687 kilograms (1,515 lb)

Start of mission
- Launch date: October 21, 1971, 00:00 UTC
- Rocket: Delta N6 (572/D-86)
- Launch site: Vandenberg SLC-2E

Orbital parameters
- Reference system: Geocentric
- Regime: Sun-synchronous
- Epoch: Planned

ITOS-B was a weather satellite operated by the National Oceanic and Atmospheric Administration (NOAA). It was part of a series of satellites called ITOS, or improved TIROS.

ITOS-B was launched on October 21, 1971 from Vandenberg Air Force Base, California, on a Delta N6 (sn. 572/D-86) rocket. It failed to achieve a successful Earth orbit. A malfunction in the second stage launch vehicle caused the spacecraft to reenter the Earth's atmosphere about 1 hour after lift-off.

== Description ==
ITOS-B was designed to provide improved operational infrared and visual observations of earth cloud cover for use in weather analysis and forecasting. Secondary objectives included obtaining both solar proton and global heat balance data on a daily basis. To accomplish these tasks, the Sun-synchronous spacecraft carried four cameras - 2 television cameras for automatic picture transmissions (APT) and two advanced vidicon camera system (AVCS) cameras. It also carried a low-resolution flat plate radiometer, a solar proton monitor, and two scanning radiometers that not only could measure emitted IR radiation but could also serve as a backup system for the APT and AVCS cameras.

The nearly cubical spacecraft measured 1 by 1 by 1.2 meters (3.3 ft × 3.3 ft × 3.9 ft). The TV cameras and infrared sensors were mounted on the satellite baseplate with their optical axes directed vertically earthward. The satellite was equipped with three curved solar panels that were folded during launch and were to be deployed after orbit was achieved. Each panel measured over 4.2 meters (14 ft) in length when unfolded and was covered with 3420 solar cells, each 2 centimeters (0.79 in) by 2 centimeters (0.79 in). A dynamics and attitude control system was designed to maintain desired spacecraft orientation through gyroscopic principles incorporated into the satellite design. Earth orientation was to be maintained by taking advantage of the precession induced from a momentum flywheel so that the satellite body precession rate of one revolution per orbit would provide the desired 'Earth looking' attitude. Minor adjustments in attitude and orientation could be made by means of magnetic coils and by varying the speed of the momentum flywheel.
