= Australis-OSCAR 5 =

Amateur radio satellite

- Names: AO-5
- COSPAR ID: 1970-008B
- SATCAT no.: 04321

Spacecraft properties
- Bus: AMSAT
- Manufacturer: University of Melbourne
- Launch mass: 17.7 kg (39 lb)

Start of mission
- Launch date: 23 January 1970, 11:31:02 UTC
- Rocket: Delta N6 (Delta D76)
- Launch site: Vandenberg, SLC-2W
- Contractor: Douglas Aircraft Company

Orbital parameters
- Reference system: Geocentric orbit
- Regime: Low Earth orbit
- Perigee altitude: 1432 km
- Apogee altitude: 1478 km
- Inclination: 102.04°
- Period: 115 minutes

Australis-OSCAR 5 (a.k.a. AO-5) is an amateur radio satellite that was launched into Low Earth Orbit on 23 January 1970 by a Thor Delta launcher from Vandenberg Air Force Base, Lompoc, California. AO-5 was launched piggyback with TIROS-M (ITOS-1) weather satellite).

== Spacecraft ==
Built by students at The University of Melbourne, Melbourne, Victoria, Australia. Battery powered, Australis-OSCAR 5 transmitted telemetry on both 2 meter (144.050 MHz at 50 mW) and 10 meter (29.450 MHz at 250 mW) bands that operated for 23 and 46 days respectively. Passive magnetic attitude stabilization was performed by carrying two bar magnets to align with the Earth's magnetic field in order to provide a favorable antenna footprint. The University of Melbourne compiled tracking reports from hundreds of stations in 27 countries.

== Firsts ==
- First amateur satellite to be remotely controlled.
- First amateur satellite launch coordinated by new AMSAT organization.
- Switch to Arabic numbering for this and future OSCAR satellites, from earlier Roman numeral usage (I, II, III, IV) by Project Oscar.

== Notes ==
- David Bellair and Stephen Howard, "Australis Oscar - Its Design, Construction and Operation," QST, July 1969, pp 58–61
- David Bellair and Stephen Howard, "Obtaining Data from Australis-Oscar 5," QST, August 1969, pp 70, 72, 82
- Jan King, "Proposed Experiments with Australis-Oscar 5," QST, December 1969, pp 54–55
- "Strays", QST, March 1970, p. 86 (a bibliography on AO-5)
- William Dunkerley Jr., "Australis Oscar 5: The Launch Story," QST, April 1970, p. 61
- Ray Soifer, "Australis-Oscar 5 Ionospheric Propagation Results", QST, October 1970, pp 54–57
- Jan King, "Australis-Oscar 5 Spacecraft Performance", QST, December 1970, pp 64–69
