= TIROS-9 =

NASA weather satellite

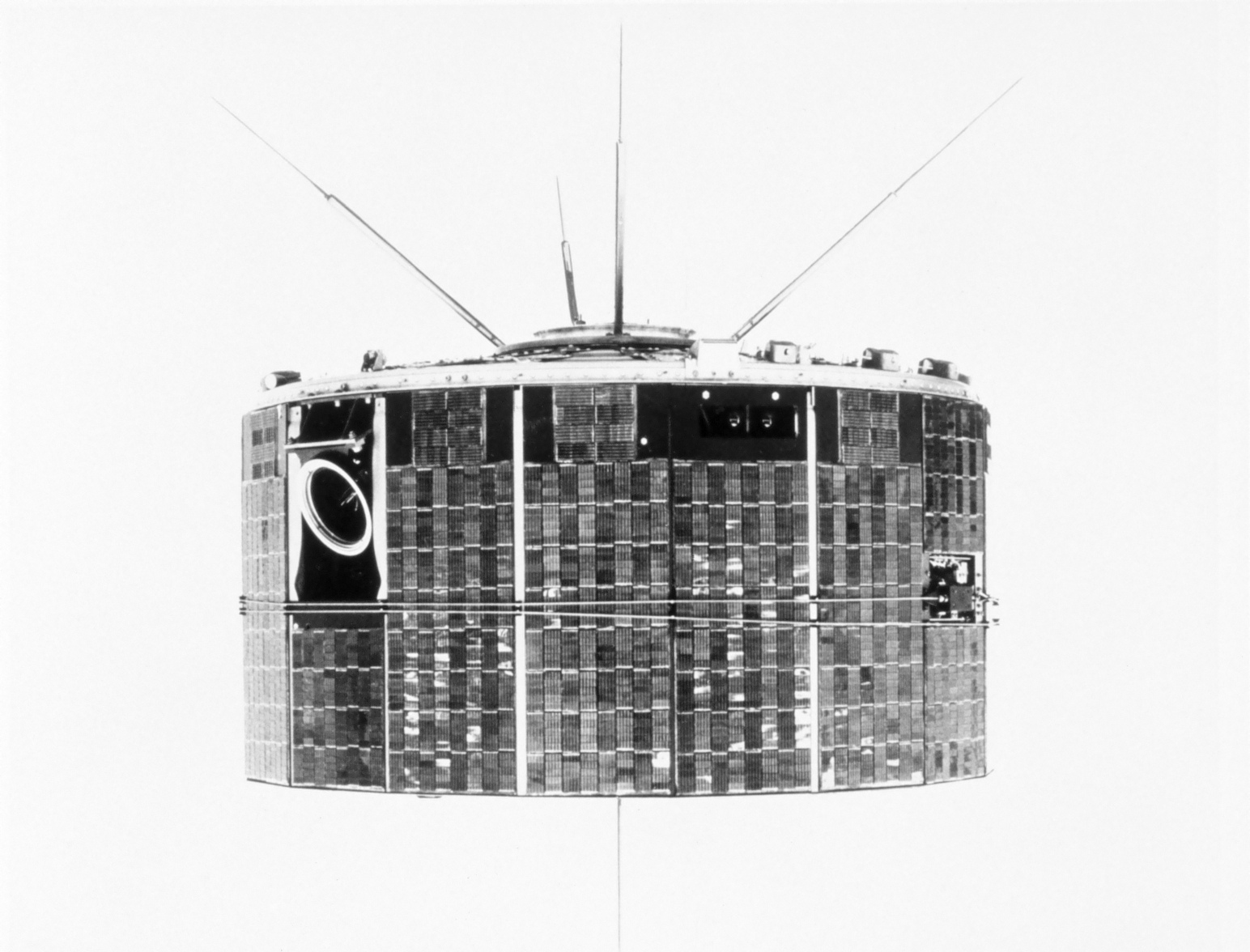
- TIROS-9 satellite
- Mission type: Weather satellite
- Operator: NASA
- COSPAR ID: 1965-004A
- SATCAT no.: 978

Spacecraft properties
- Spacecraft type: TIROS
- Manufacturer: RCA / GSFC
- Launch mass: 138.30 kilograms (304.9 lb)
- Dimensions: 1.07 m × 0.56 m (3.5 ft × 1.8 ft)

Start of mission
- Launch date: January 22, 1965, 07:52 UTC
- Rocket: Thor-Delta C 374/D-28
- Launch site: Cape Canaveral LC-17A

End of mission
- Last contact: February 15, 1967

Orbital parameters
- Reference system: Geocentric
- Regime: Low Earth
- Eccentricity: 0.11693
- Perigee altitude: 705 kilometers (438 mi)
- Apogee altitude: 2,582 kilometers (1,604 mi)
- Inclination: 96.43°
- Period: 119.23 minutes
- Epoch: January 22, 1965

Instruments
- Television Camera System

TIROS-9 (also called TIROS-I or A-54) was a spin-stabilized meteorological satellite. It was the ninth in a series of Television Infrared Observation Satellites.

== Launch ==
TIROS-9 was launched on January 22, 1965, by a Thor-Delta rocket from Cape Canaveral Air Force Station, Florida. The spacecraft functioned nominally until February 15, 1967. The satellite orbited the Earth once every 2 hours, at an inclination of 96°. Its perigee was 705 kilometers (438 mi) and apogee was 2,582 kilometers (1,604 mi).

== Mission ==
TIROS-9 was a spin-stabilized meteorological spacecraft designed to test experimental television techniques and infrared equipment. The satellite was in the form of an 18-sided right prism, 107 cm in diameter and 56 cm high. The top and sides of the spacecraft were covered with approximately 9000 1-by 2-cm silicon solar cells. It was equipped with 2 independent television camera subsystems for taking cloudcover pictures, plus an omnidirectional radiometer and a five-channel scanning radiometer for measuring radiation from the earth and its atmosphere. The satellite spin rate was maintained between 8 and 12 rpm by use of five diametrically opposed pairs of small, solid-fuel thrusters.

The TV system operated normally until April 1, 1965, when one of the wide-angle TV cameras failed. The other camera operated normally until July 26, 1965, and sporadically until February 15, 1967. TIROS 9 was the first satellite in the TIROS series to be placed in a near-polar orbit, thereby increasing TV coverage to the entire daylight portion of the Earth.
