= NOAA-1 =

American weather satellite (1970–1971)

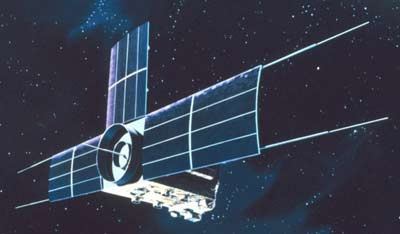
- Illustration of the NOAA-1 (ITOS-A) meteorological satellite
- Mission type: Weather
- Operator: NOAA
- COSPAR ID: 1974-106A
- SATCAT no.: 04793

Spacecraft properties
- Manufacturer: RCA Astro
- Launch mass: 306 kilograms (675 lb)

Start of mission
- Launch date: December 11, 1970, 11:35 UTC
- Rocket: Delta-N6
- Launch site: Vandenberg SLC-2W

End of mission
- Deactivated: August 19, 1971

Orbital parameters
- Reference system: Geocentric
- Regime: Sun-synchronous
- Eccentricity: 0.00319
- Perigee altitude: 1,422 kilometers (884 mi)
- Apogee altitude: 1,472 kilometers (915 mi)
- Inclination: 101.9 degrees
- Period: 114.8 minutes
- Epoch: December 11, 1970

Instruments
- APT, AVCS, FPR, SPME, SR

NOAA-1, also known as ITOS-A, was a weather satellite operated by the National Oceanic and Atmospheric Administration (NOAA). It was part of a series of satellites called ITOS, or improved TIROS.

NOAA-1 was launched on a Delta rocket on December 11, 1970. The launch carried one other satellite: CEP 1. It was deactivated by NOAA on August 19, 1971.

== Details ==
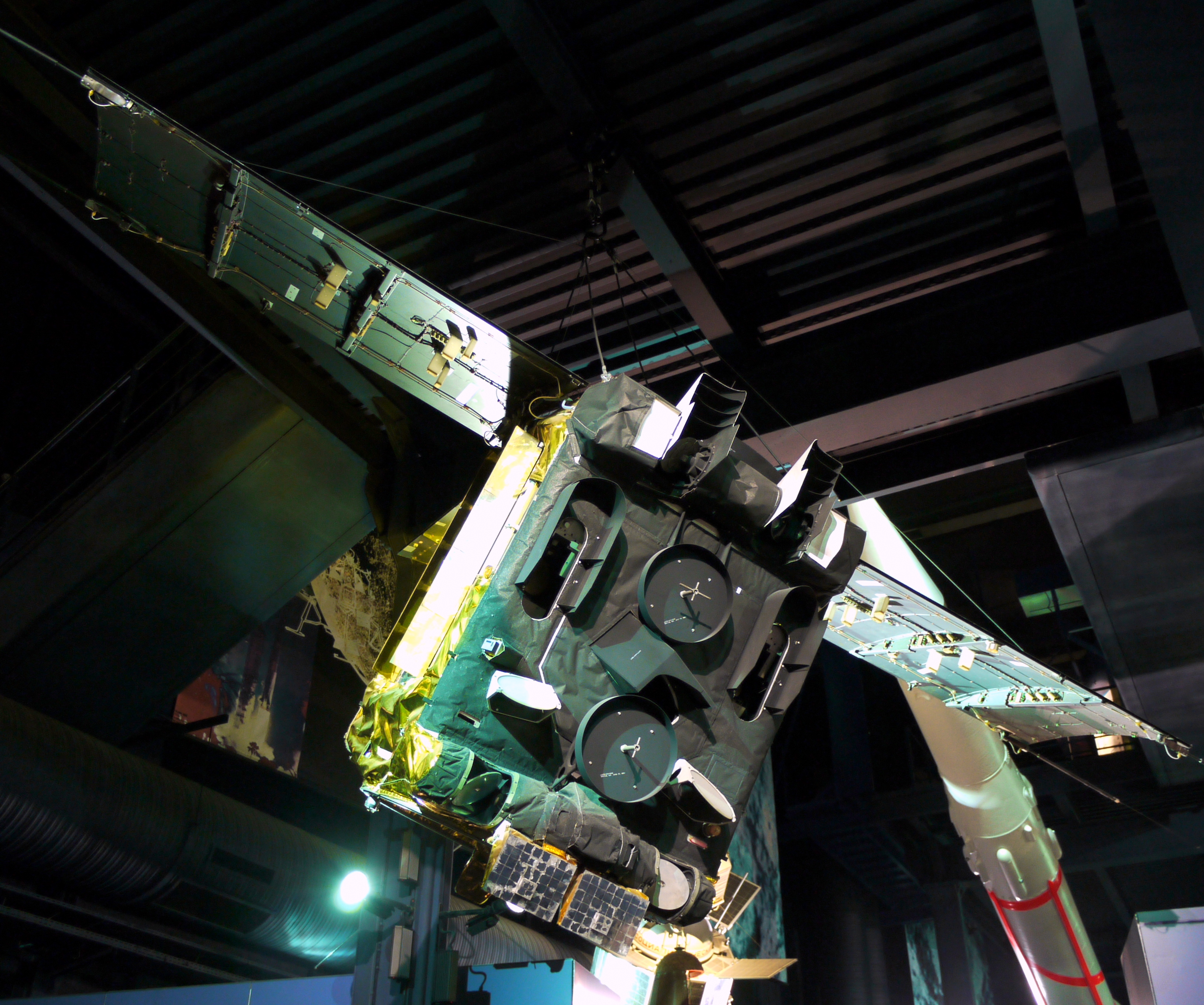
ITOS-A model at the Museum of Air and Space

The NOAA 1 sun-synchronous meteorological satellite was primarily designed to enhance the operational capability of infrared and visual observations of Earth's cloud cover, facilitating weather analysis and forecasting. Additionally, the satellite was tasked with regularly collecting solar proton data and monitoring global heat balance.

To achieve these objectives, NOAA 1 was equipped with four cameras: two television cameras for Automatic Picture Transmission (APT) and two Advanced Vidicon Camera System (AVCS) cameras. The satellite also featured a low-resolution flat plate radiometer, a solar proton monitor, and two scanning radiometers. These radiometers not only measured emitted infrared radiation but also served as backup systems for the APT and AVCS cameras.

The spacecraft had a nearly cubical structure, measuring 1 by 1 by 1.2 meters. The TV cameras and infrared sensors were mounted on the baseplate, oriented vertically towards Earth. The satellite was powered by three curved solar panels, which were folded during launch and deployed upon reaching orbit. When fully extended, each panel measured over 4.2 meters in length and was covered with 3,420 solar cells, each 2 by 2 centimeters in size.

NOAA 1's attitude control system utilized gyroscopic principles to maintain the desired orientation. The satellite's Earth-facing orientation was stabilized using precession induced by a momentum flywheel, achieving one revolution per orbit to maintain the correct attitude. Minor adjustments were made using magnetic coils and by varying the speed of the momentum flywheel.

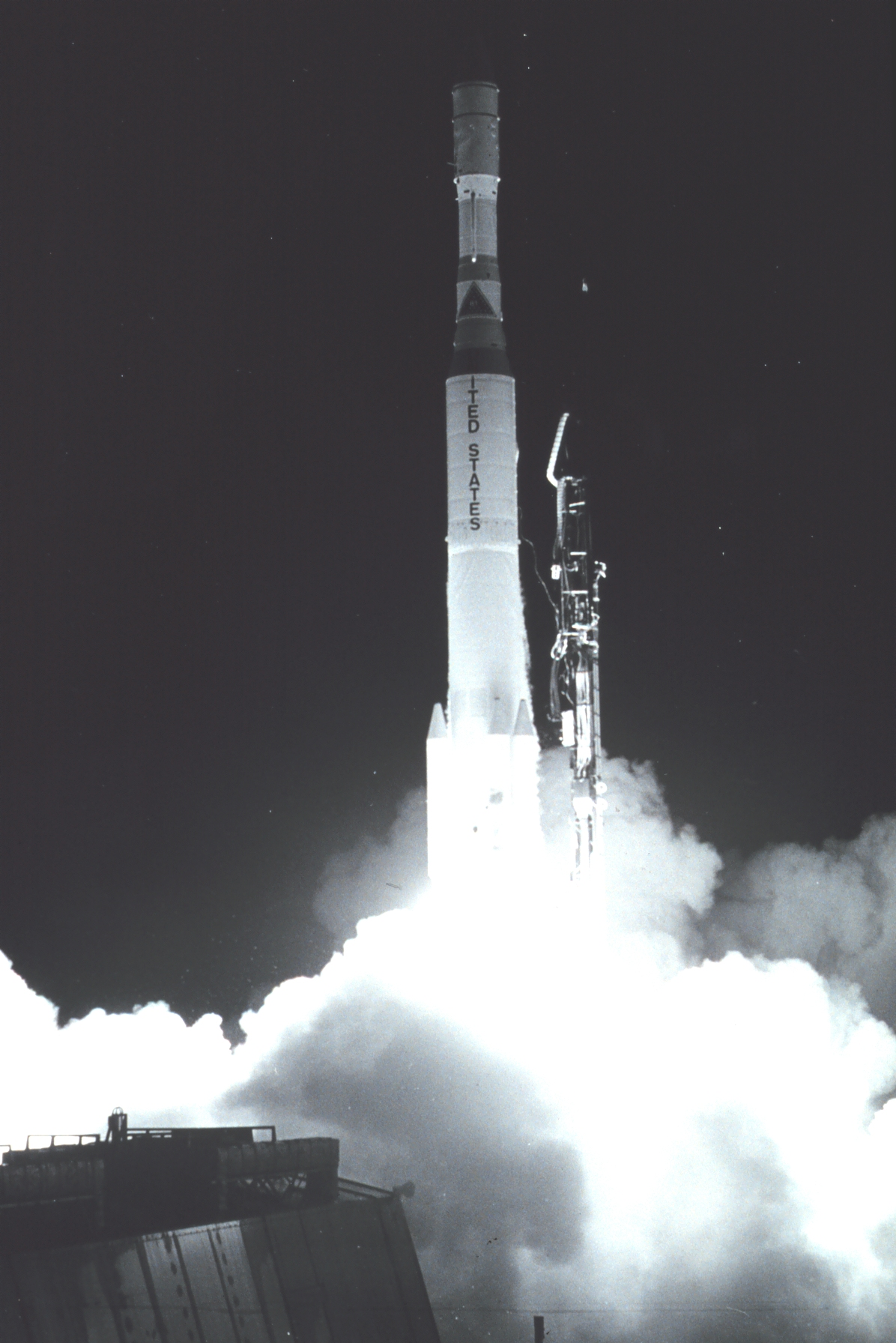
NOAA 1 (ITOS -A) lifts off on Launch Vehicle Delta 81

Launched into a near-polar orbit, NOAA 1 and its subsystems operated normally until May 29, 1971, when the incremental tape recorder malfunctioned, leading to a partial loss of solar proton data and a total loss of flat plate radiometer data. In response to overheating in the attitude control system, the APT and Direct Readout InfraRed (DRIR) subsystems were deactivated on June 20, 1971. The AVCS was subsequently turned off, and the scanning radiometer continued to function partially until the satellite was fully deactivated on August 19, 1971.
