= TIROS-N =

American weather satellite

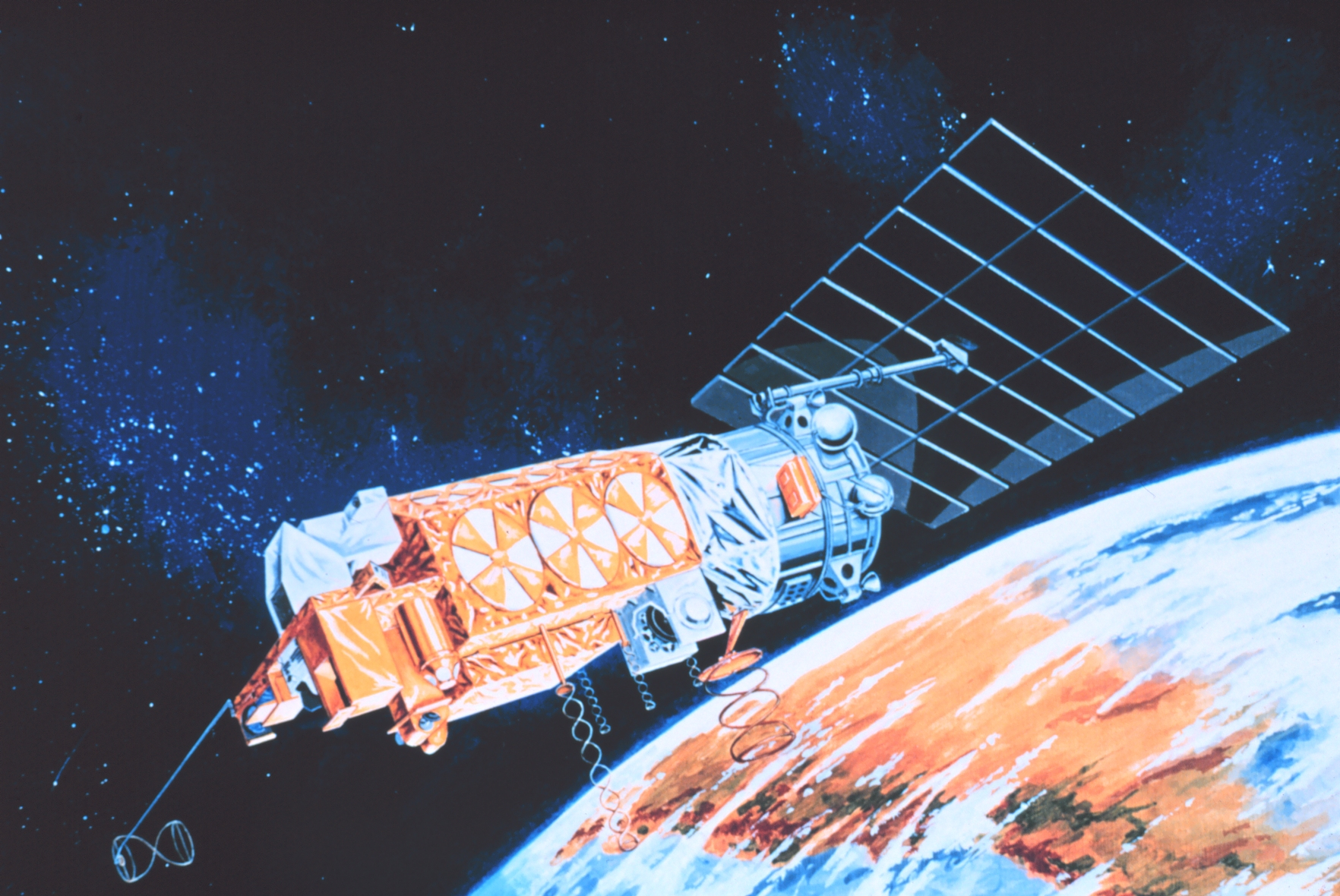
- Mission type: Weather
- Operator: NOAA
- COSPAR ID: 1978-096A
- SATCAT no.: 11060
- Mission duration: 2 years (planned); 868 days (achieved)

Spacecraft properties
- Spacecraft: TIROS-N
- Launch mass: 734 kg (1,618 lb)

Start of mission
- Launch date: 13 October 1978, 11:23:00 UTC
- Rocket: Atlas F
- Launch site: Vandenberg Air Force Base

End of mission
- Deactivated: 27 February 1981

Orbital parameters
- Reference system: Geocentric orbit
- Regime: Sun-synchronous orbit
- Perigee altitude: 829 km (515 mi)
- Apogee altitude: 845 km (525 mi)
- Inclination: 98.70°
- Period: 101.70 minutes
Instruments
- AVCS: Advanced Vidicon Camera System
- APT: Automatic Picture Transmission System
- FPR: Flat Plate Radiometer
- SPM: Solar Proton Monitor
- VTPR: Vertical Temperature Profile Radiometer
- VHRR: Very High Resolution Radiometer
- AVHRR: Advanced Very High Resolution Radiometer
- ASS: Atmospheric Sounding System
- SEM: Space Environment Monitor
- TOVS: TIROS Operational Vertical Sounder
- TIP: TIROS Information Processor
- MIR: Manipulated Information Rate processor
- CSU: Cross-Strap Unit

TIROS-N satellite is the first of the TIROS-N series. It is a weather satellite launched on 13 October 1978. It was designed to become operational during 2 years. Its mass is 734 kilograms. Its perigee to Earth is 829 kilometers. Its apogee is 845 kilometers away from Earth. Its inclination is 98.70°. It was managed by the U.S. National Oceanic and Atmospheric Administration (NOAA); designed and launched by NASA. The spacecraft was 3-axis stabilized. TIROS-N was operated for 868 days until deactivated by NOAA on 27 February 1981.

== Gallery of cyclones captured by this satellite ==
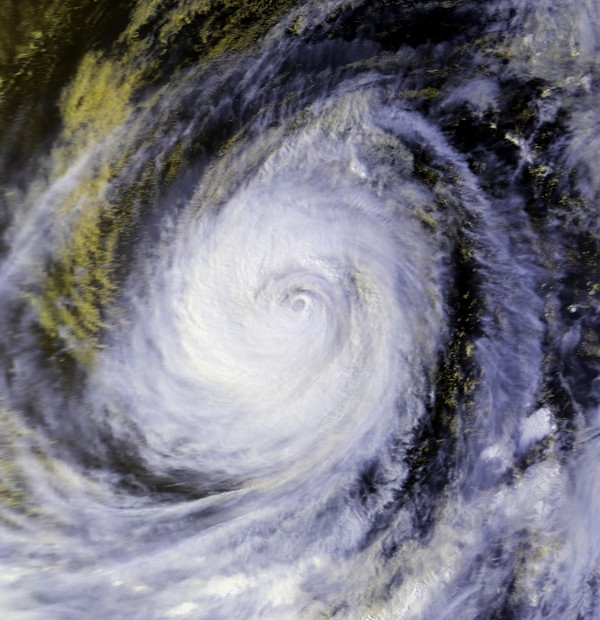
Typhoon Tip (14 October 1979) 2 days after reaching peak intensity.

Hurricane Bob (10 July 1979)

Tropical Storm Claudette (24 July 1979)

Hurricane Frederic (12 September 1979)

Hurricane Henri (17 September 1979)

Hurricane Gloria (8 September 1979)
