= TIROS-6 =

NASA weather satellite

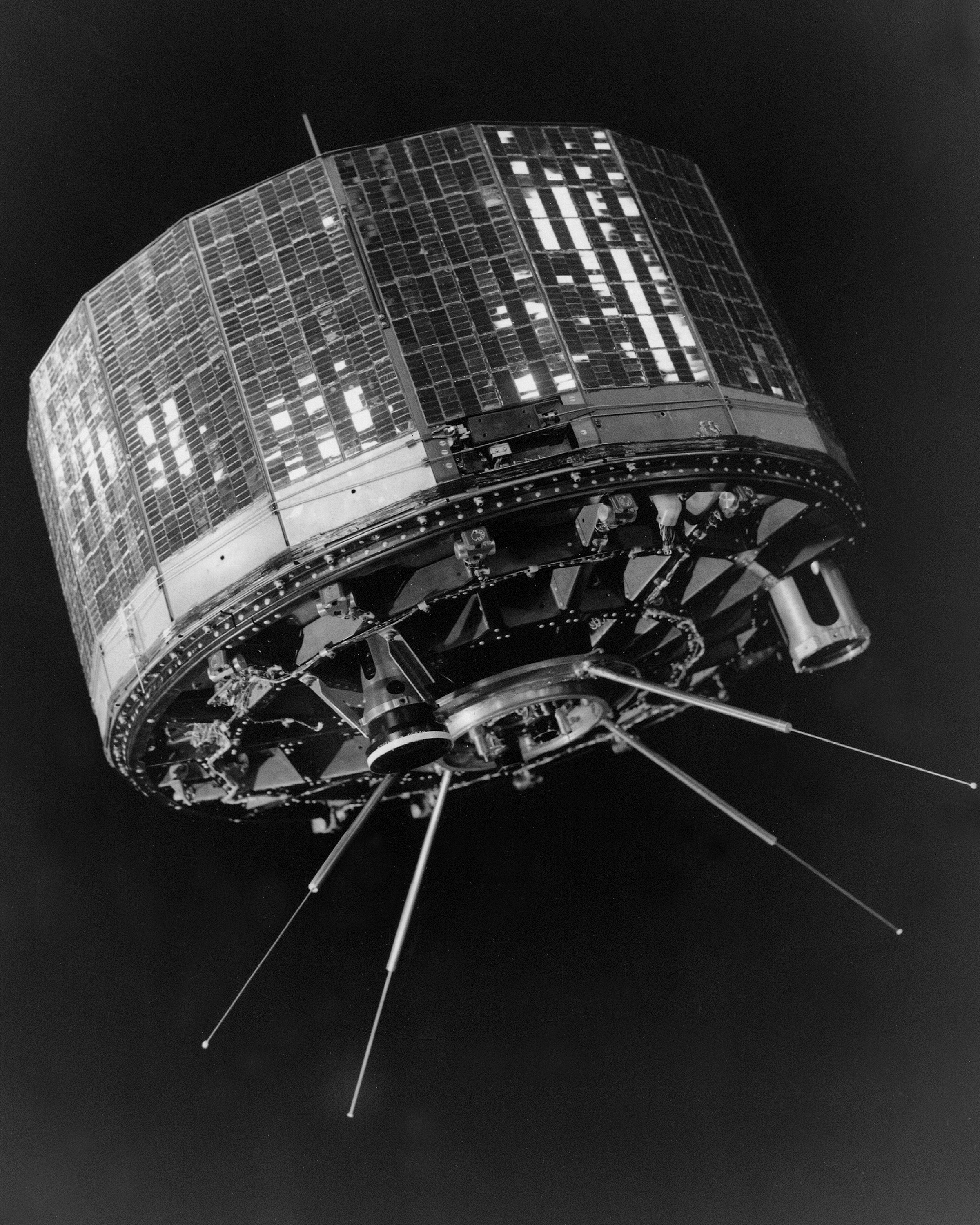
- TIROS-6.
- Mission type: Weather satellite
- Operator: NASA
- Harvard designation: 1962 αψ1
- COSPAR ID: 1962-047A
- SATCAT no.: 397
- Mission duration: 1 year and 1 month

Spacecraft properties
- Spacecraft type: TIROS
- Manufacturer: RCA Astro / GSFC
- Launch mass: 127.5 kilograms (281 lb)

Start of mission
- Launch date: September 18, 1962, 08:52 UTC
- Rocket: Thor-Delta
- Launch site: Cape Canaveral LC-17A

End of mission
- Last contact: October 21, 1963

Orbital parameters
- Reference system: Geocentric
- Regime: Low Earth
- Eccentricity: 0.00191
- Perigee altitude: 686 kilometers (426 mi)
- Apogee altitude: 712 kilometers (442 mi)
- Inclination: 58.32°
- Period: 98.70 minutes
- Epoch: September 18, 1962

Instruments
- Television Camera System

TIROS 6 (also called TIROS-F) was a spin-stabilized meteorological satellite. It was the sixth in a series of Television Infrared Observation Satellites.

== Launch ==
TIROS 6 was launched on September 18, 1962, by a Thor-Delta rocket from Cape Canaveral Air Force Station, Florida, United States. The spacecraft functioned nominally until October 21, 1962. The satellite orbited the Earth once every 1 hour and 38 minutes, at an inclination of 58.3°. Its perigee was 686 kilometers (426 mi) and apogee was 712 kilometers (442 mi).

== Mission ==
TIROS 6 was designed to further demonstrate the capability of a spacecraft to observe, record, and transmit TV cloud cover pictures for use in operational weather analysis and forecasting. The spin-stabilized satellite was in the form of an 18-sided right prism, 107 cm across opposite corners and 56 cm high, with a reinforced baseplate carrying most of the subsystems and a cover assembly. Electric energy was supplied to the spacecraft by approximately 9000 1-by 2-cm silicon solar cells mounted on the cover assembly and by 21 nickel-cadmium batteries.

A single monopole antenna for reception of ground commands extended from the top of the cover assembly. A pair of crossed-dipole telemetry antennas (235 MHz) projected down and diagonally out from the baseplate. The satellite spin rate was maintained between 8 and 12 rpm by the use of five diametrically opposed pairs of small solid-fuel thrusters mounted around the edge of the baseplate. Proper attitude was maintained to within a 1° to 2° accuracy by use of a magnetic control device consisting of 250 cores of wire wound around the outer surface of the spacecraft.

The interaction between the induced magnetic field in the spacecraft and the Earth's magnetic field provided the necessary torque for attitude control. TIROS-6 was equipped with two 1.27-cm vidicon TV cameras, one medium angle and one wide angle, for taking Earth cloudcover pictures. The pictures were transmitted directly to either of two ground receiving stations or were stored in a tape recorder on board for subsequent playback, depending on whether the satellite was within or beyond the communication range of the station.

TIROS-6 performed normally from launch until November 29, 1962, when the medium-angle camera vidicon failed. The wide-angle camera vidicon system failed on October 21, 1963, and the spacecraft was deactivated shortly thereafter.

== Gallery ==
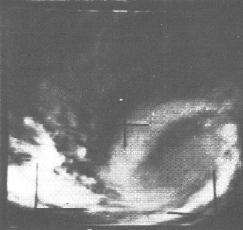
Super Typhoon Karen (Nov. 11, 1962). The eye of the storm is barely visible in the darker portion of the clouds.

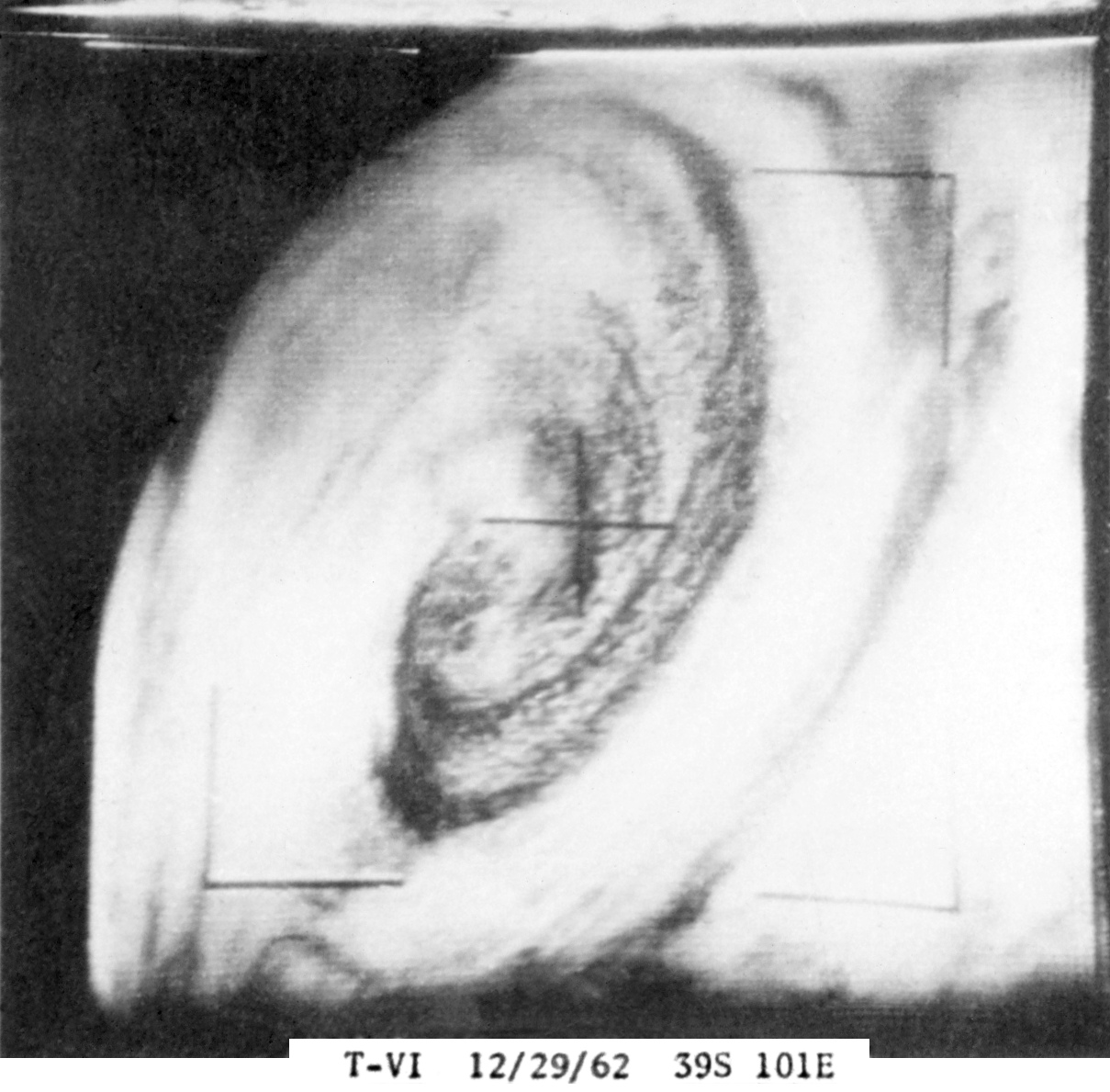
Extratropical cyclone centered at 39 S, 101E in the Indian Ocean (Dec. 29, 1962)

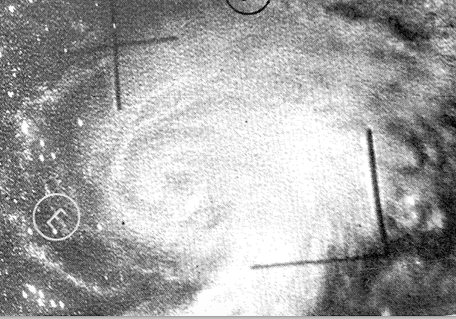
Hurricane Arlene (Aug. 10, 1963)

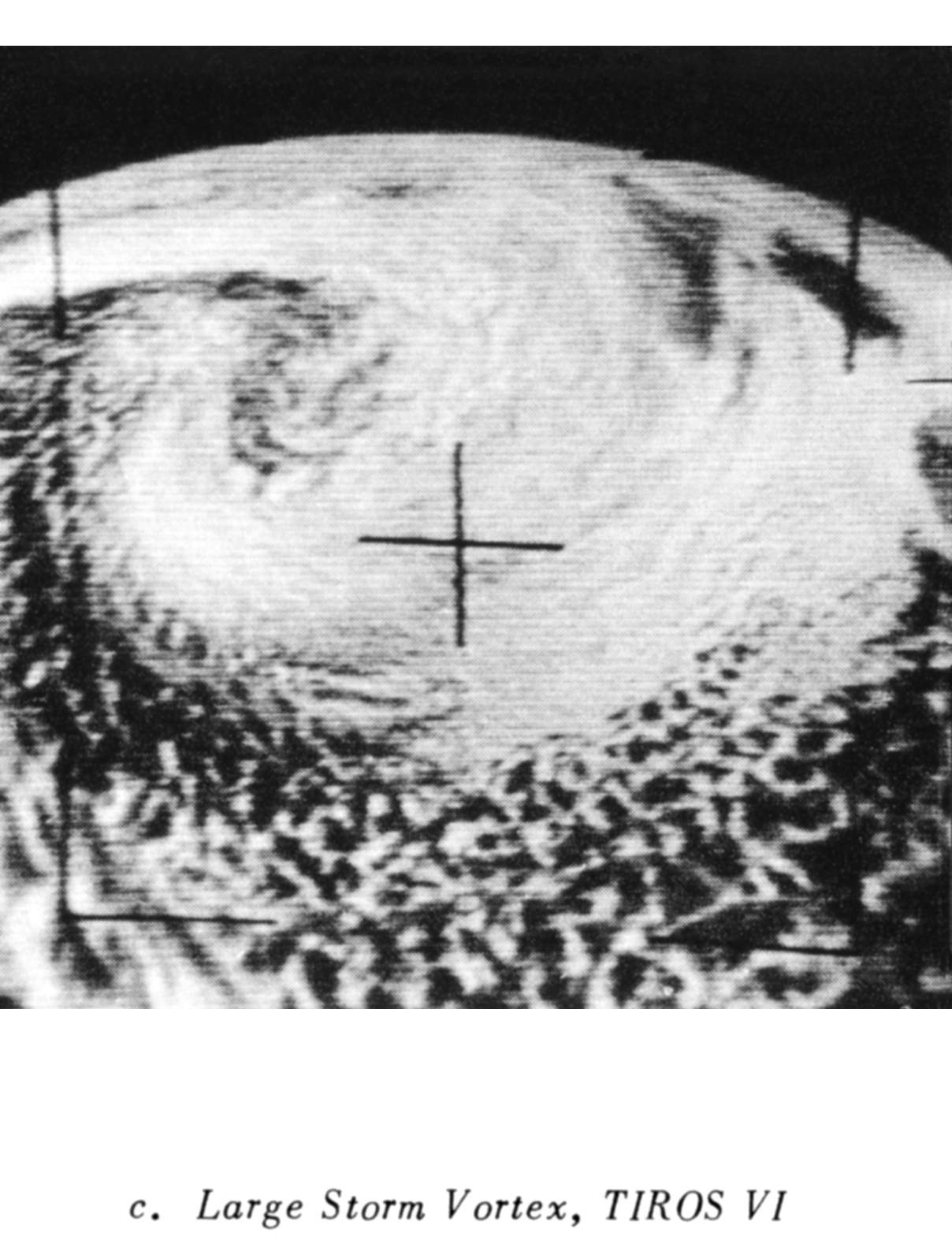
A large storm vortex (1963)

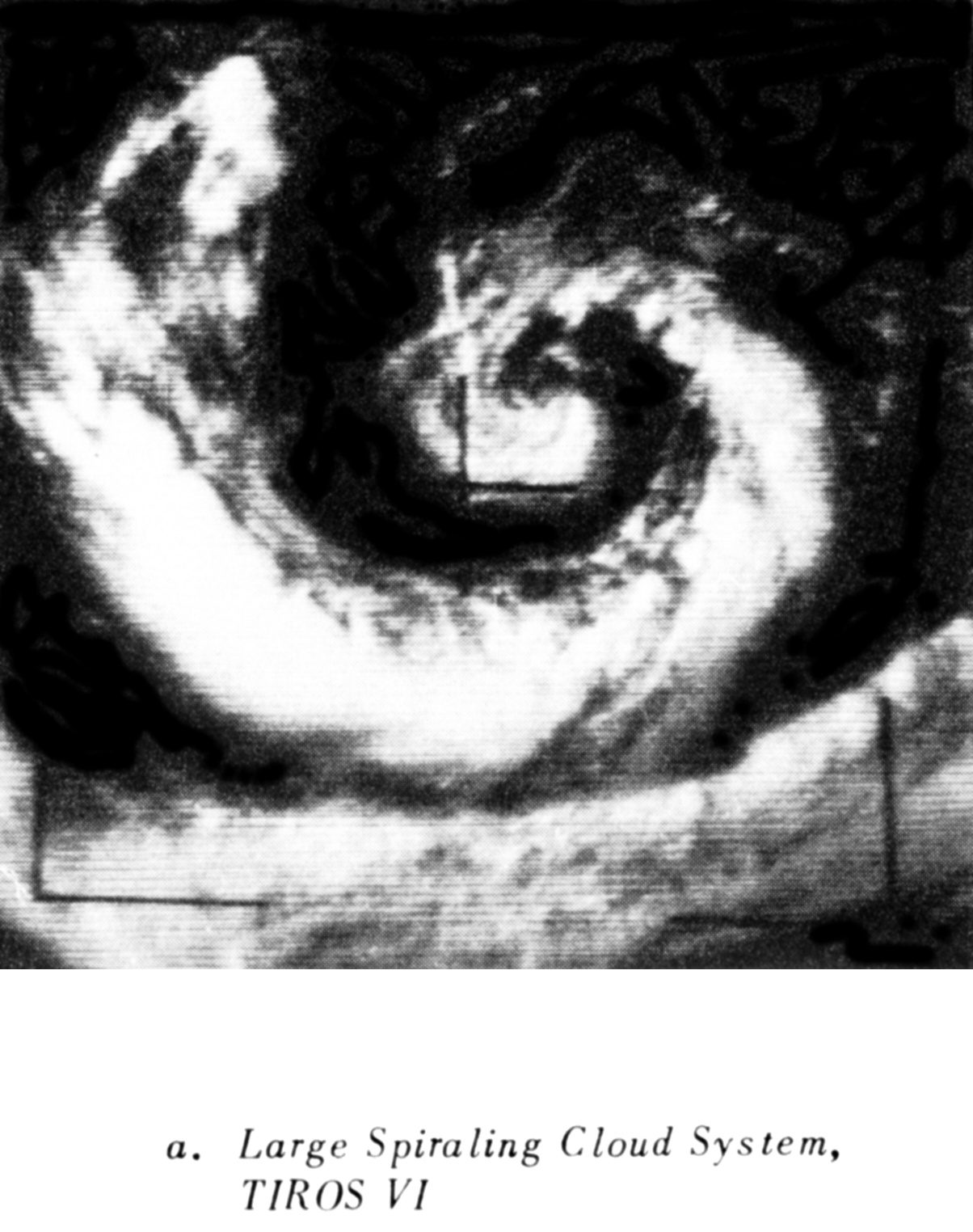
A large spiraling cloud system (1963)
