= TIROS-4 =

NASA weather satellite

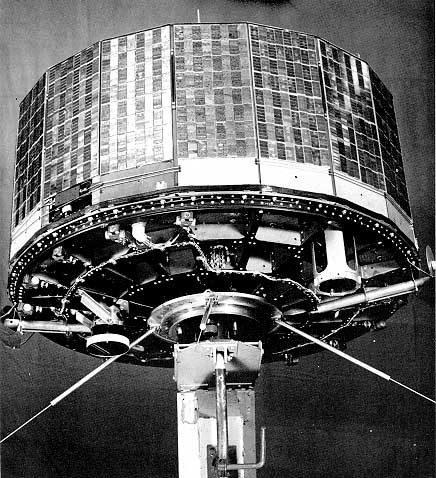
- Image of TIROS-4.
- Mission type: Weather satellite
- Operator: NASA
- Harvard designation: 1962 β 1
- COSPAR ID: 1962-002A
- SATCAT no.: 226
- Mission duration: 141 days

Spacecraft properties
- Spacecraft type: TIROS
- Manufacturer: RCA Astro / GSFC
- Launch mass: 129.3 kilograms (285 lb)

Start of mission
- Launch date: February 8, 1962, 12:29 UTC
- Rocket: Thor-Delta
- Launch site: Cape Canaveral LC-17A

End of mission
- Last contact: June 30, 1962

Orbital parameters
- Reference system: Geocentric
- Regime: Low Earth
- Eccentricity: 0.0075789
- Perigee altitude: 681 kilometers (423 mi)
- Apogee altitude: 789 kilometers (490 mi)
- Inclination: 48.3°
- Period: 99.5 minutes
- Epoch: February 8, 1962

Instruments
- Low Resolution Omnidirectional Radiometer; Widefield Radiometer; Scanning Radiometer; Television Camera System

TIROS-4 (also called TIROS-D and A9) was a spin-stabilized meteorological satellite. It was the fourth in a series of Television Infrared Observation Satellites.

== Launch ==
TIROS-4 was launched on February 8, 1962, by a Thor-Delta rocket from Cape Canaveral Air Force Station, Florida. The spacecraft functioned nominally until June 30, 1962. The satellite orbited the Earth once every 99 minutes and 30 seconds, at an inclination of 48.3°. Its perigee was 681 kilometers (423 mi) and apogee was 789 kilometers (490 mi).

== Mission ==
The satellite was in the form of an 18-sided right prism, 107 cm in diameter and 56 cm high. The top and sides of the spacecraft were covered with approximately 9000 1- by 2-cm silicon solar cells. It was equipped with two independent television camera subsystems for taking cloud cover pictures and three radiometers (two-channel low-resolution, omnidirectional, and five-channel scanning) for measuring radiation from the Earth and its atmosphere. The satellite spin rate was maintained between 8 and 12 rpm by the use of five diametrically opposed pairs of small solid-fuel thrusters.

The TIROS-4 spin axis could be oriented to within 1° to 2° accuracy by use of a magnetic control device consisting of 250 cores of wire wound around the outer surface of the spacecraft. The interaction between the induced magnetic field in the spacecraft and the Earth's magnetic field provided the necessary torque for attitude control. The flight control system also optimized the performance of the solar cells and television cameras and protected the 5 channel infrared radiometer from prolonged exposure to direct sunlight.

With the exception of the degraded response of the 5 channel scanning radiometer, the spacecraft performed normally until May 3, 1962, when one camera failed. On June 10, 1962, the other camera's tape recorder failed. The scanning radiometer provided usable data until June 30, 1962.

== Gallery ==
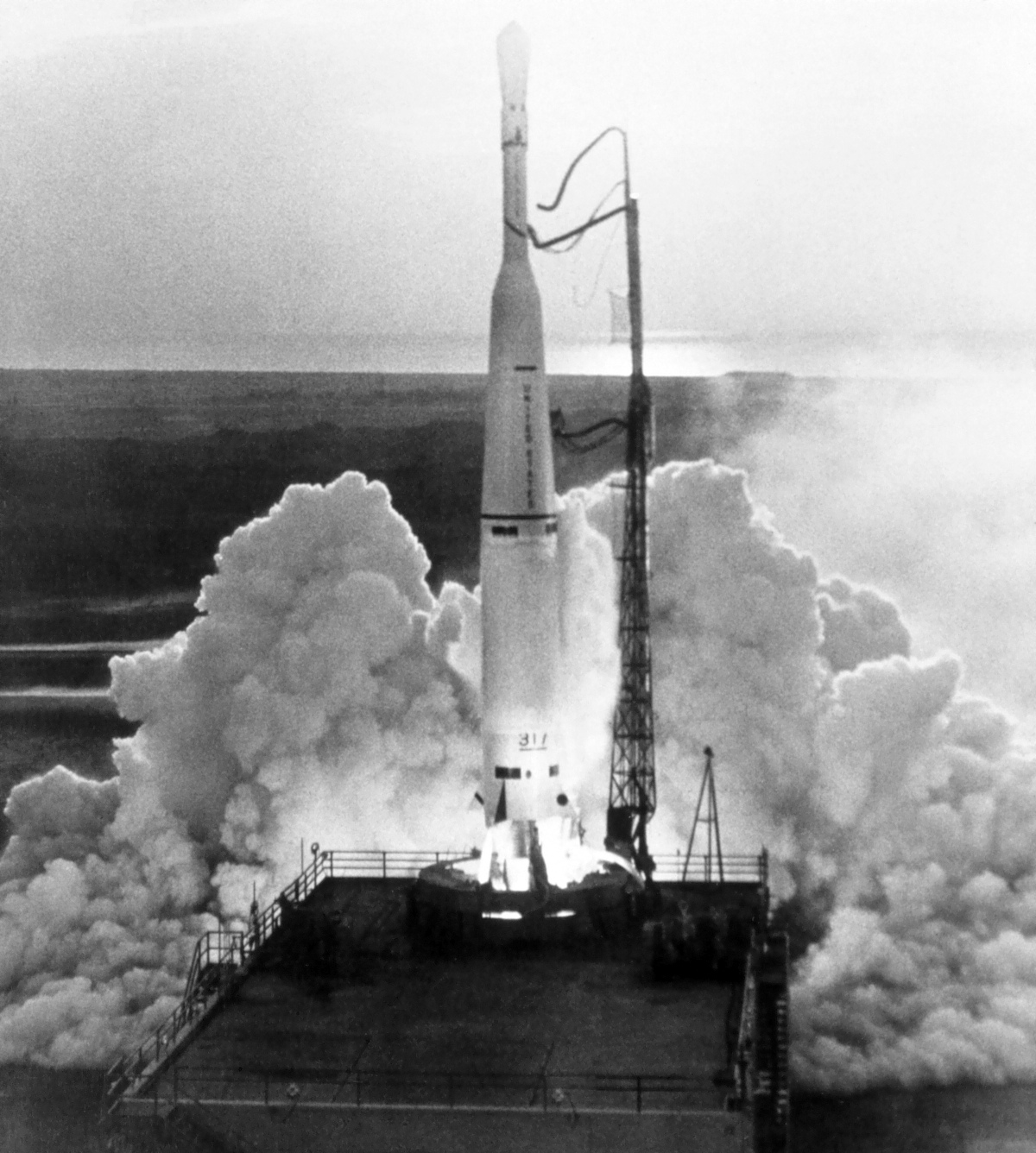
TIROS-4 launch on February 8, 1962, by a Thor-Delta rocket

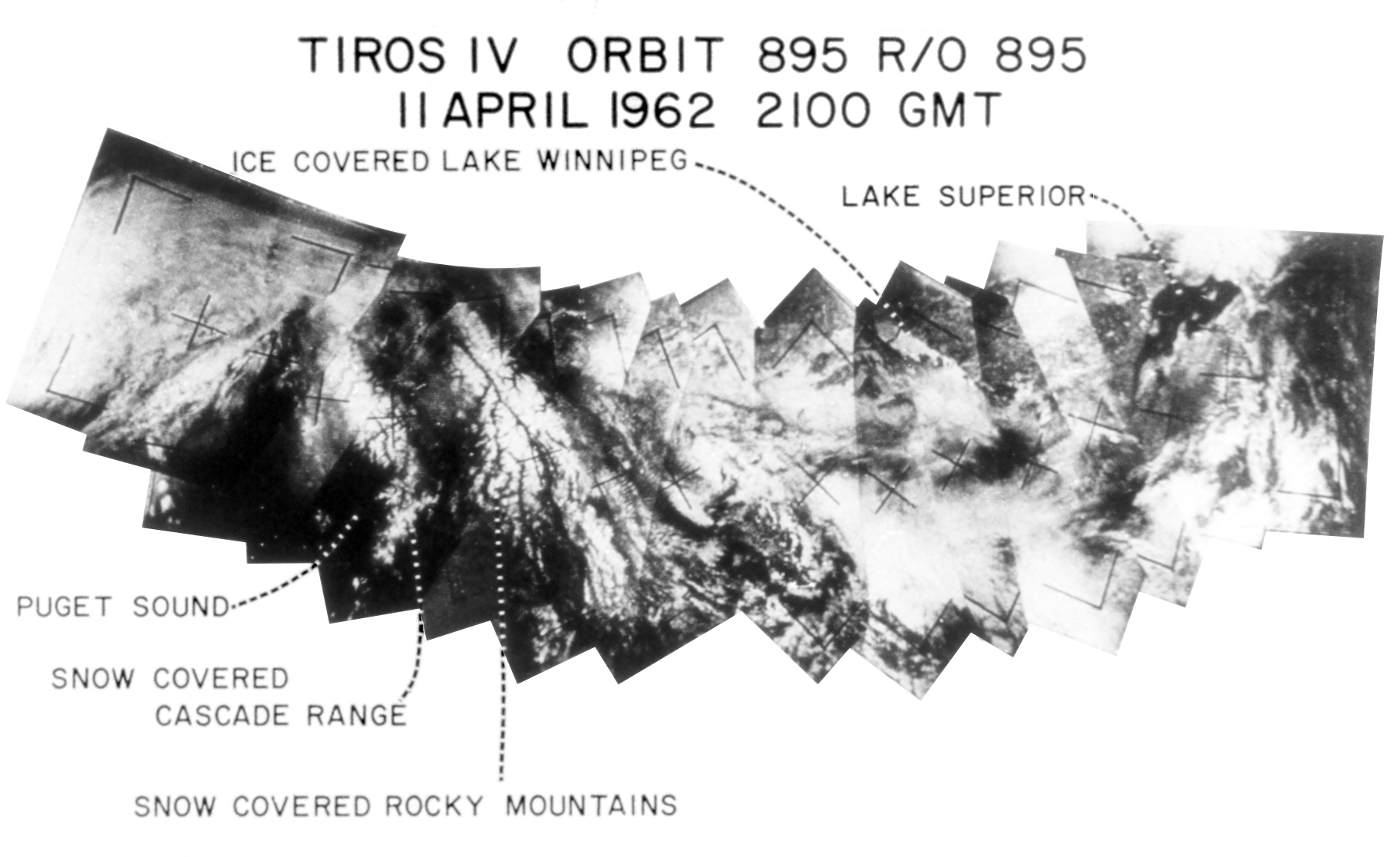
TIROS-4 images of northwestern United States on April 11, 1962

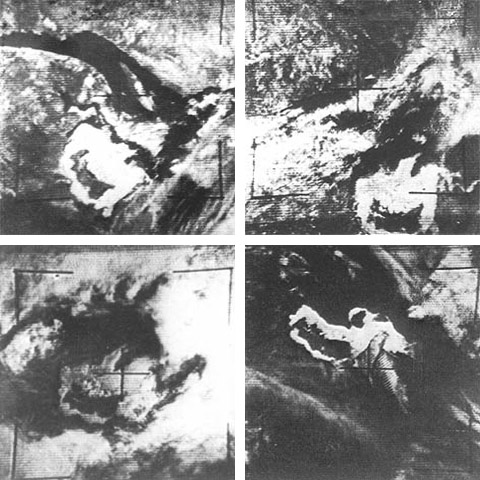
TIROS-4 pictures of Gulf of St. Lawrence and surroundings
