= Explorer 12 =

NASA satellite of the Explorer program

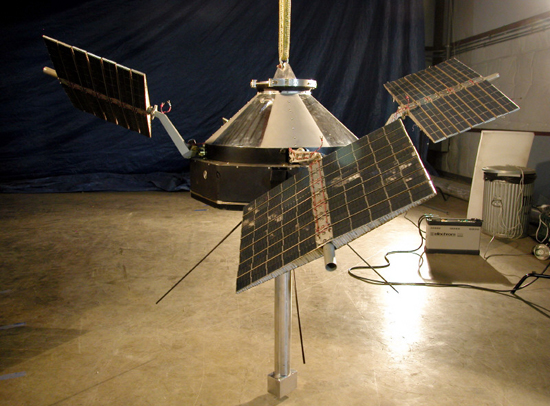
- Explorer 12 satellite
- Names: EPE-A; Energetic Particles Explorer-A; Explorer XII; NASA S-3
- Mission type: Space physics
- Operator: NASA
- Harvard designation: 1961 Upsilon 1
- COSPAR ID: 1961-020A
- SATCAT no.: 00170
- Mission duration: 365 days (planned); 112 days (achieved)

Spacecraft properties
- Spacecraft: Explorer XII
- Spacecraft type: Energetic Particles Explorer
- Bus: S-3
- Manufacturer: Goddard Space Flight Center
- Launch mass: 37.6 kg (83 lb)
- Power: 4 deployable solar arrays and batteries

Start of mission
- Launch date: 16 August 1961, 03:21:25 GMT
- Rocket: Thor-Delta A (Thor 312 / Delta 006)
- Launch site: Cape Canaveral, LC-17B
- Contractor: Douglas Aircraft Company
- Entered service: 16 August 1961

End of mission
- Last contact: 6 December 1961
- Decay date: 1 September 1963

Orbital parameters
- Reference system: Geocentric orbit
- Regime: Highly elliptical orbit
- Perigee altitude: 790 km (490 mi)
- Apogee altitude: 77,620 km (48,230 mi)
- Inclination: 33.40°
- Period: 1587.00 minutes

Instruments
- Charged particles Cosmic-Ray Experiment; Electrostatic Analyzer of Solar Plasma; Fluxgate Magnetometers; Proton-Electron Scintillation Detector; Solar Cell Damage Experiment

Explorer 12, also called EPE-A or Energetic Particles Explorer-A and as S3), was a NASA satellite built to measure the solar wind, cosmic rays, and the Earth's magnetic field. It was the first of the S-3 series of spacecraft, which also included Explorer 14, 15, and 26. It was launched on 16 August 1961, aboard a Thor-Delta launch vehicle. It ceased transmitting on 6 December 1961 due to power failure.

== Spacecraft ==
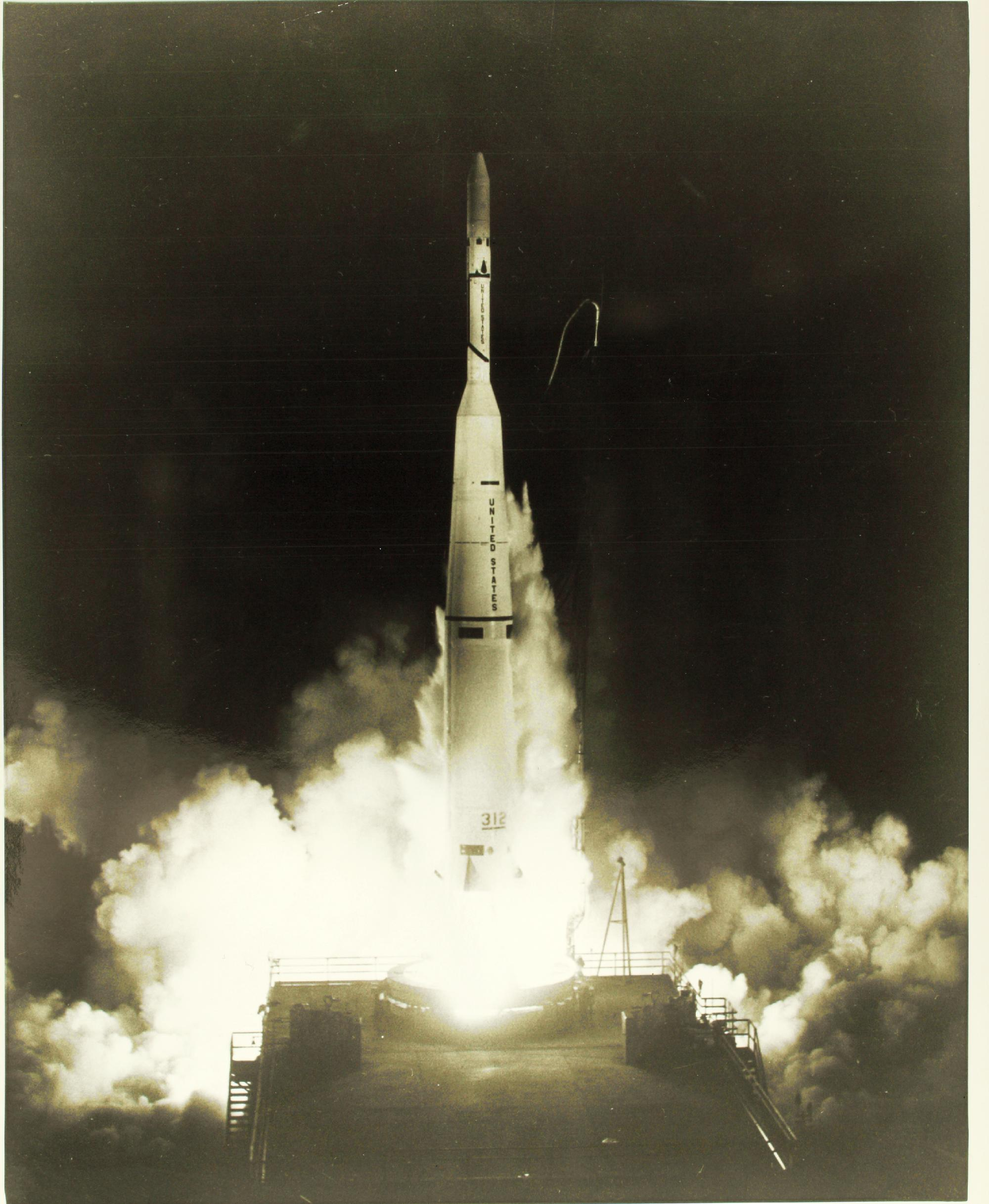
Explorer 12 launch

The spacecraft weighed 37.6 kg (83 lb). Explorer 12 was a spin-stabilized, solar-cell-powered spacecraft instrumented to measure cosmic-ray particles, trapped particles, solar wind protons, and magnetospheric and interplanetary magnetic fields.

== Instruments ==
Explorer 12 was designed to study space physics, and so had a multitude of instruments including a cosmic-ray detector, a particle trapper, and a magnetometer. Its instrumentation included 10 particle detection systems for the measurement of protons and electrons and their relation to magnetic fields, a solar cell damage experiment, optical aspect sensor and one transmitter. A 16-channel PFM / PM time-division multiplexed telemeter was used. The time required to sample the 16 channels (one frame period) was 0.324 seconds. Half of the channels were used to convey eight-level digital information, and the other channels were used for analog information. During ground processing of the telemetered data, the analog information was digitized with an accuracy of 1/100 of full scale. One analog channel was subcommutated in a 16-frame-long pattern and was used to telemeter spacecraft temperatures, power system voltages, currents, etc. A digital solar aspect sensor measured the spin period and phase, digitized to 0.041 seconds, and the angle between the spin axis and Sun direction to about 3° intervals. Good data was recorded for 90% of the mission.

== Experiments ==
=== Charged particles ===
The experiment was designed to measure the flux and energy spectrum of charged particles and cosmic rays and to determine their spatial and temporal distribution over the spacecraft orbit. The detectors included: (1) a shielded Anton type 302 omnidirectional Geiger–Müller tube, which detected protons with E>23 MeV and electrons with E>1.6 MeV, (2) an electron magnetic spectrometer utilizing three thin-windowed Anton type 213 directional Geiger–Müller tubes sensitive to electrons with energies from 40 to 100 keV, and (3) three directional cadmium sulfide crystals for measurements of the total flux of protons with energies from 1 keV to 10 MeV and electrons with energies from 200 eV to 500 keV. All directional detectors were mounted so that the axes of their fields of view were perpendicular to the satellite spin axis. (The initial spin period was 2.2 seconds.) Counts in each detector were accumulated for 10.24 seconds, and the contents of the accumulators were telemetered at the end of each sampling interval. The encoder accumulators were time shared so that each detector response was sampled once every 79 seconds. The experiment operated satisfactorily from launch until spacecraft failure on 6 December 1961.

=== Cosmic rays ===
The instrumentation for the Cosmic-Ray Experiment consisted of (1) a double scintillation counter that measured 55- to 500-MeV protons in six energy intervals and protons above 600 MeV, (2) a single scintillator that measured 1.4- to 22-MeV protons at five energy thresholds and electrons above 150 keV, and (3) a GM counter telescope that measured proton fluxes above 30 MeV. A complete set of measurements was made every 6.8 min. The experiment operated throughout the active lifetime of the spacecraft.

=== Electrostatic Analyzer of Solar Plasma ===
An electrostatic analyzer with a current collector was used to investigate boundary phenomena between the geomagnetic field and the interplanetary plasma and to monitor low-energy proton fluxes at lower altitudes. The instrument detected protons in the energy range 100 eV to 20 keV. The voltage across the plates rose to full value in about one-half second and then decayed in 155 s, during which time the collector plate current was sampled 470 times. Particles were accepted over a 10- by 80-deg solid angle that swept out a nearly hemispherical region of space as the payload spun. Proton current measurement had a dynamic range of 10 to the fourth power. The experiment apparently malfunctioned before injection into orbit and returned no useful data.

=== Fluxgate Magnetometers ===
This experiment was designed to measure the magnitude and direction of the Earth's magnetic field between 3 and 13 Earth radii. It consisted of three orthogonal fluxgate magnetometers mounted on the end of an 86.4 cm (34.0 in) boom. One magnetometer axis was within 2° of the spacecraft spin axis. Each of the three sensors had a range of -1000 to +1000 nT with a digitization uncertainty of 12 nT. The three components of the magnetic field were all measured within a 50-ms time period once every 327 ms. An inflight calibration system applied a known magnetic field to each sensor in turn once every 115 seconds. This experiment performed normally from launch through 6 December 1961.

=== Proton-Electron Scintillation Detector ===
This experiment was designed to measure the directional fluxes and spectra of low-energy trapped and auroral protons and electrons. It employed a 5-mg-thick powder phosphor scintillator covered with a 1000-A aluminum coating. Additional absorbers were inserted in the detector aperture by a 16-position stepped wheel. The aperture was pointed at 45° to the spin axis. Due to the thinness and type of phosphor, the detector in the pulse mode would respond only to low-energy ions, and, therefore, essentially measured the flux of protons that penetrated the absorbers and stopped in the phosphor. Both the pulse counting rate and the phototube current were telemetered once each frame period. Sixteen readings were telemetered in each wheel position, and thus one complete set of data was obtained every 256 frames (one wheel revolution=80 seconds). Protons in seven energy ranges were measured. The high energy limit was about 10 MeV for all ranges, and the low-energy cutoffs were 100, 135, 186, 251, 512, 971, and 1668 keV. The energy fluxes of electrons in three ranges were measured separately using scatter geometry, absorbers, and the phototube current. The low-energy cutoffs were 15, 26, and 31 keV, and the high-energy cutoff was about 100 keV for all three ranges. Except for saturation of some of the proton channels in the heart of the outer belt, the experiment worked properly throughout the life of the spacecraft.

=== Solar Cell Damage Experiment ===
Four banks of p-on-n solar cells were cemented to the satellite skin to measure the effects of the deterioration caused by direct exposure to radiation in the Van Allen radiation belts. On bank of cells remained unprotected, while the others had 3-, 20-, and 60-mil-thick coatings of protective glass. The unshielded strip of cells degraded very rapidly during the first two orbits. On each orbit, severe degradation began about 2.5 hours before perigee, when the altitude of the satellite was approximately 33,000 km (21,000 mi). After the first two orbits, the remaining output of the cells was only 50% of the initial output. The periods of severe degradation coincided with periods of peaked directional intensities of protons with energies between 150 kev and 4.5 mev. It is known that protons of this level would not penetrate the 20-mil glass shields. When the satellite ceased transmitting, the output of the unshielded cells had further degraded to 29% of the initial value. The solar cells with 3-mil glass shields degraded by approximately 6% over the lifetime of the satellite. No solar cell degradation was indicated of the banks with 20- and 60-mil shielding when their outputs were compared on 19 September and 3 December 1961, when the incident-Sun angle was the same.

== Launch ==
This satellite was launched from the Atlantic Missile Range by a Delta launch vehicle on 16 August 1961. Its objective was the investigation solar wind, interplanetary magnetic fields, distant portions of the Earth's magnetic field, and energetic particles in interplanetary space and in the Van Allen radiation belt.

== Mission ==
The spacecraft achieved orbit and all instrumentation operated normally. Its transmitter ceased operations on 6 December 1961, after sending 2568 hours of real time data. During its life of 112 days, it completed 102 orbits and data was acquired approximately 80% of the time. This satellite provided significant geophysical data on radiation and magnetic storms.

The spacecraft functioned well until 6 December 1961, when it ceased transmitting data apparently as a result of failures in the power system. Good data were recorded for approximately 90% of the active lifetime of the spacecraft. The initial spin rate was 28.0 rpm, and the spin axis direction was right ascension 48°, declination -28°. The direction was nearly constant with time, and the spin rate slowly increased with time to 34.3 rpm. Apogee direction varied from about 12:00 hours to 06:00 hours local time.

A back-up satellite of the Explorer-12 is on display in the Space Science exhibition station at the Steven F. Udvar-Hazy Center in Chantilly, Virginia.

== See also ==
- Explorer program
