= TIROS-3 =

NASA weather satellite

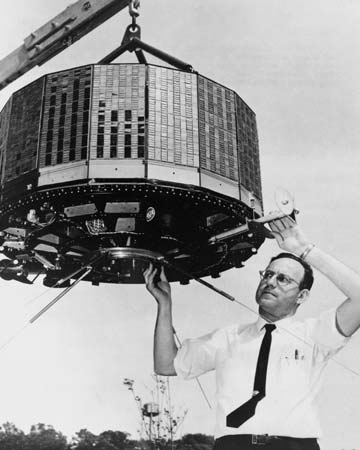
- TIROS-3 satellite
- Mission type: Weather satellite
- Operator: NASA
- Harvard designation: 1961 Ro 1
- COSPAR ID: 1961-017A
- SATCAT no.: 162
- Mission duration: 6 months

Spacecraft properties
- Spacecraft type: TIROS
- Manufacturer: RCA Astro / GSFC
- Launch mass: 129.3 kilograms (285 lb)

Start of mission
- Launch date: July 12, 1961, 10:19 UTC
- Rocket: Thor DM-19 Delta
- Launch site: Cape Canaveral LC-17A

End of mission
- Last contact: February 28, 1962

Orbital parameters
- Reference system: Geocentric
- Regime: Low Earth
- Eccentricity: 0.00489
- Perigee altitude: 742 kilometers (461 mi)
- Apogee altitude: 812 kilometers (505 mi)
- Inclination: 47.9°
- Period: 100.41 minutes
- Epoch: July 12, 1961

Instruments
- Low Resolution Omnidirectional Radiometer; Widefield Radiometer; Scanning Radiometer; Television Camera System

TIROS-3 (or TIROS-C) was a spin-stabilized meteorological satellite. It was the third in a series of Television Infrared Observation Satellites.

== Launch ==
TIROS-3 was launched on July 12, 1961, by a Thor-Delta rocket from Cape Canaveral Air Force Station, Florida. The spacecraft functioned nominally until January 22, 1962. The satellite orbited the Earth once every 98 minutes, at an inclination of 47.9°. Its perigee was 742 kilometers (401 nmi) and apogee was 812 kilometers (438 nmi).

The polar-orbiting weather satellite TIROS-3 was launched with automatic picture transmission capability in 1963, which eventually provided continuous cloud images to over 100 nations.

== Mission ==
The satellite was in the form of an 18-sided right prism, 107 cm in diameter and 56 cm high. The top and sides of the spacecraft were covered with approximately 9000 1- by 2-cm silicon solar cells. TIROS-3 was equipped with two independent television camera subsystems for taking cloud cover pictures, plus a two-channel low-resolution radiometer, an omnidirectional radiometer, and a five-channel infrared scanning radiometer. All three radiometers were used for measuring radiation from the Earth and its atmosphere.

The satellite spin rate was maintained between 8 and 12 rpm by use of five diametrically opposed pairs of small, solid-fuel thrusters. The satellite spin axis could be oriented to within 1- to 2-deg accuracy by use of a magnetic control device consisting of 250 cores of wire wound around the outer surface of the spacecraft. The interaction between the induced magnetic field in the spacecraft and the Earth's magnetic field provided the necessary torque for attitude control. The flight control system also optimized the performance of the solar cells and TV cameras and protected the five-channel infrared radiometer from prolonged exposure to direct sunlight.

The spacecraft performed normally until August 1961, when the scanning radiometer began to fail. Performance was sporadic until January 23, 1962. It was deactivated on February 28, 1962.

== Gallery ==
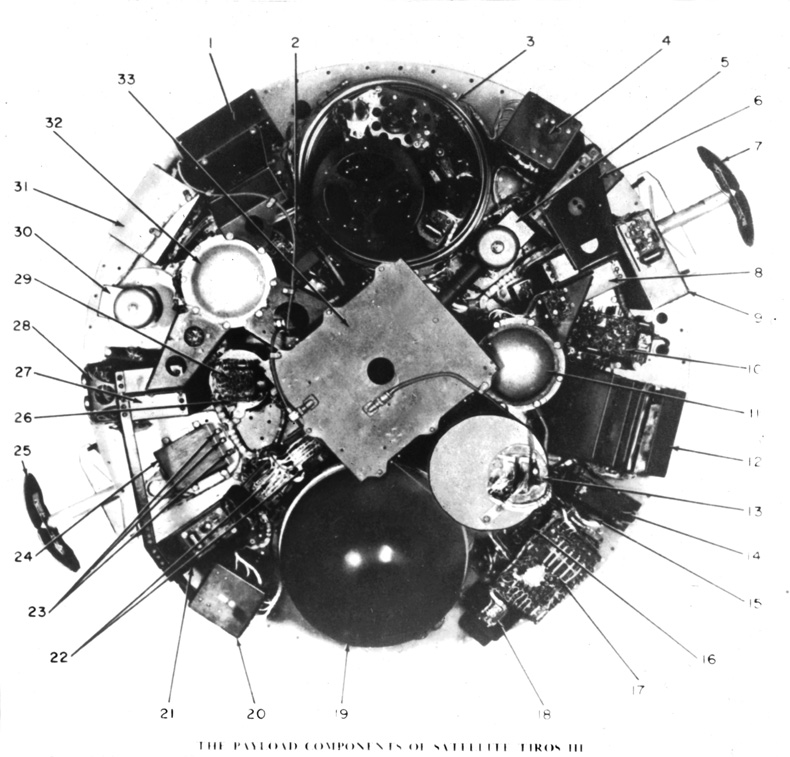
Major components of TIROS-3

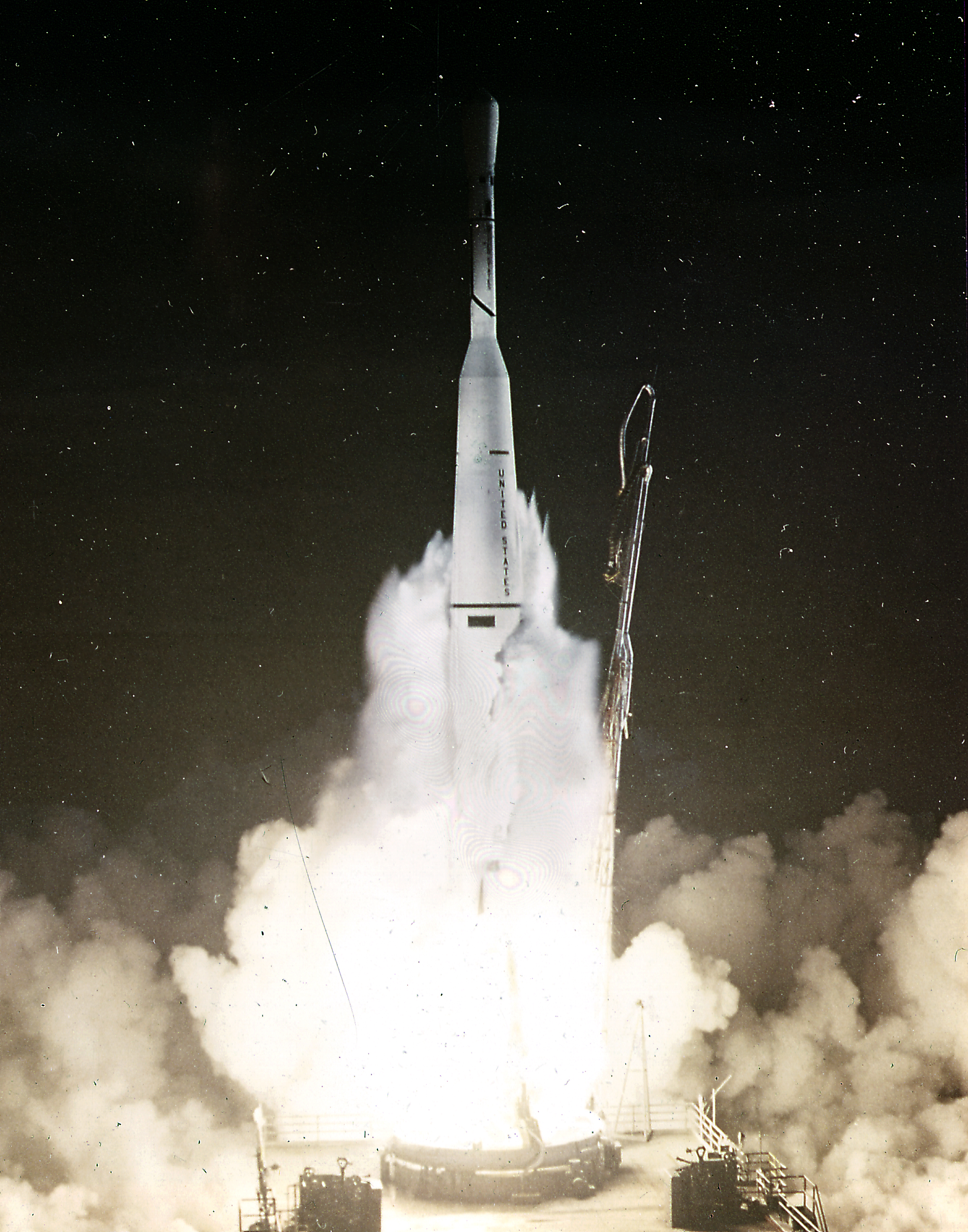
Launch of TIROS-3

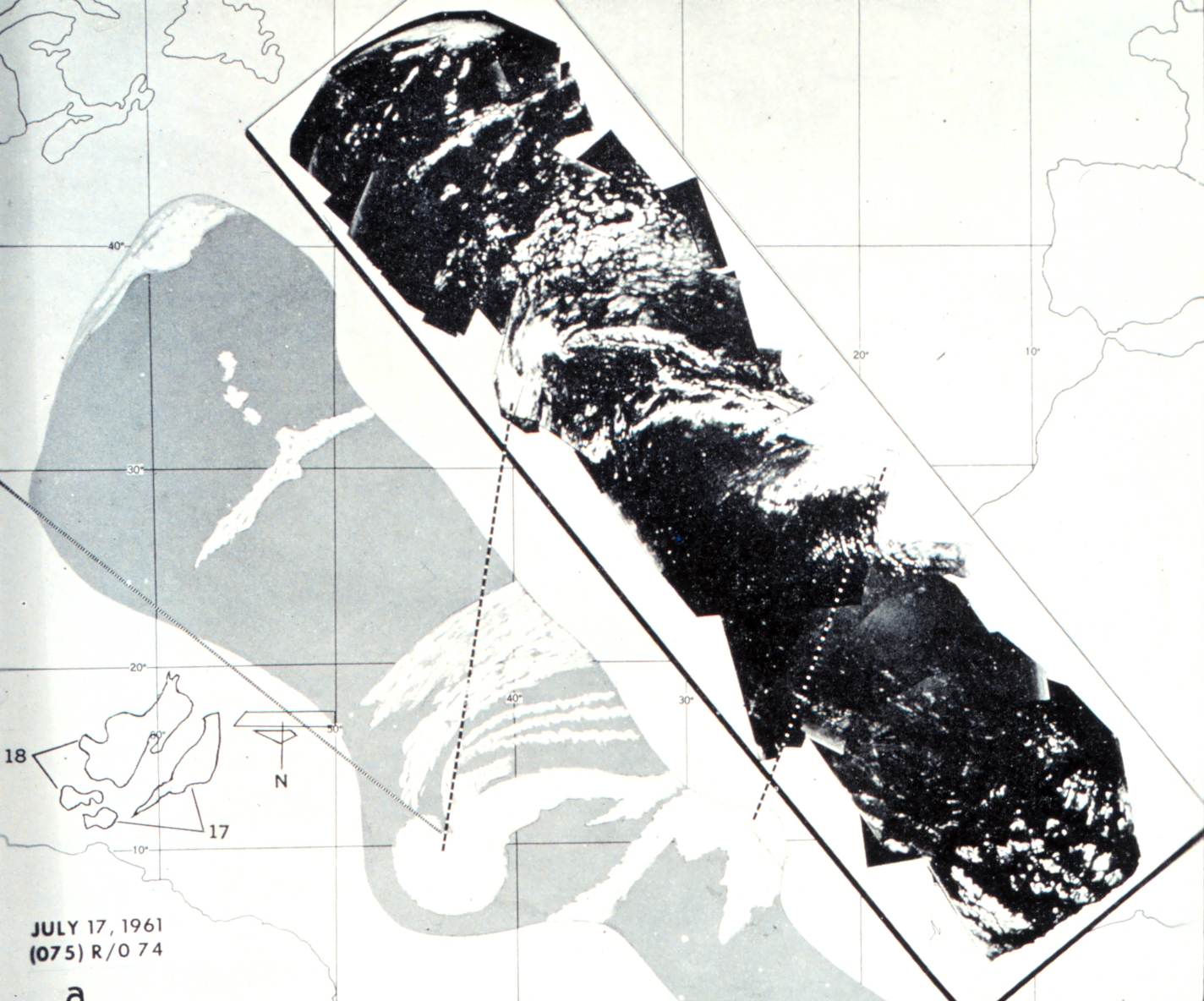
Composite of TIROS-3 pictures. The main cloud mass later developed into Hurricane Anna (17 July 1961)

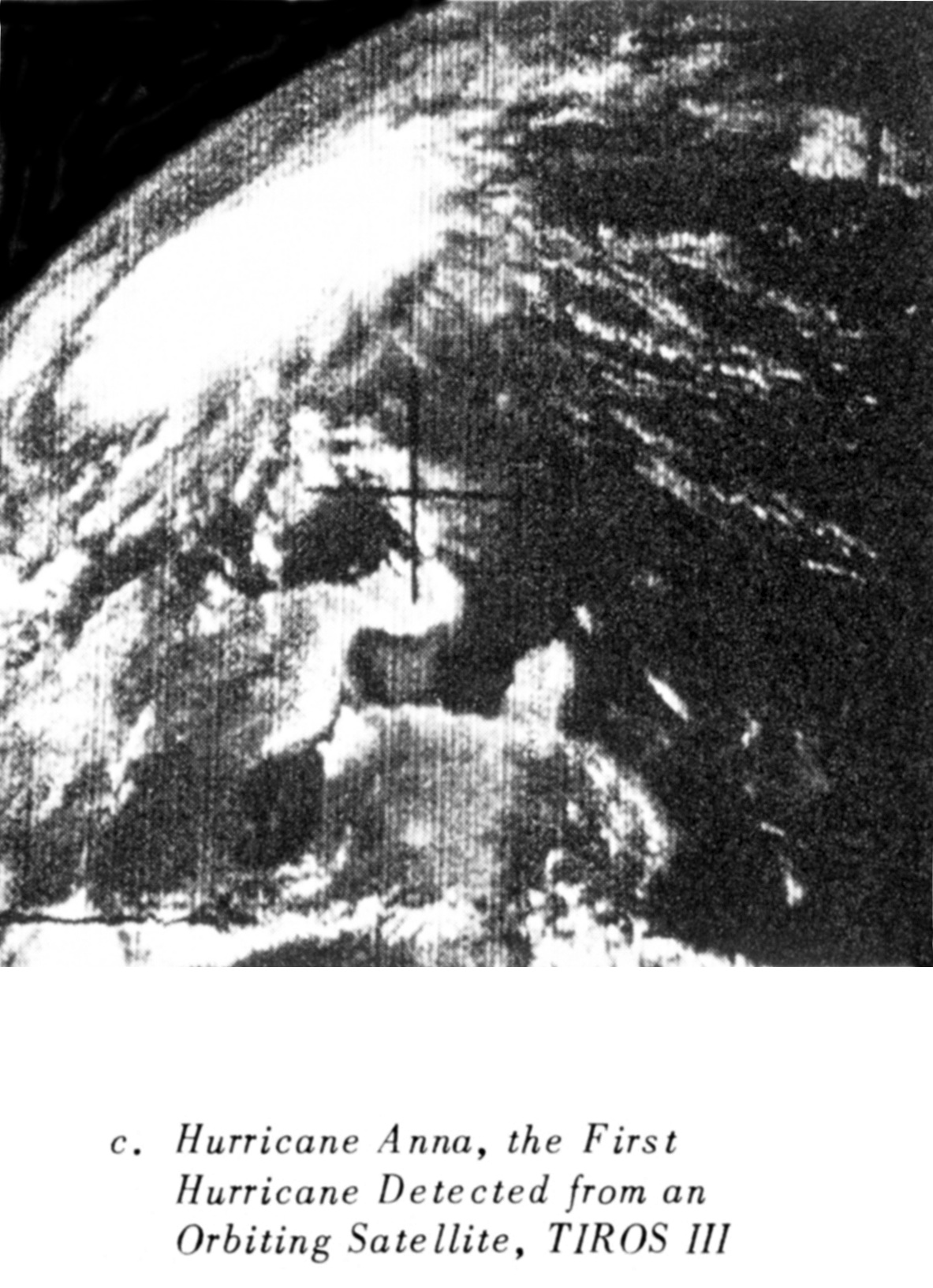
Hurricane Anna by TIROS-3 (July 1961)

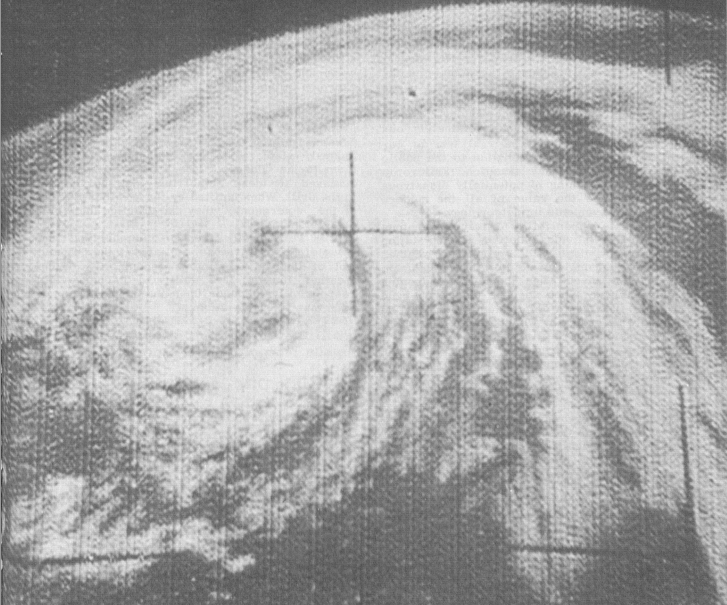
Tropical Storm Liza by Tiros-3 (19 July 1961)

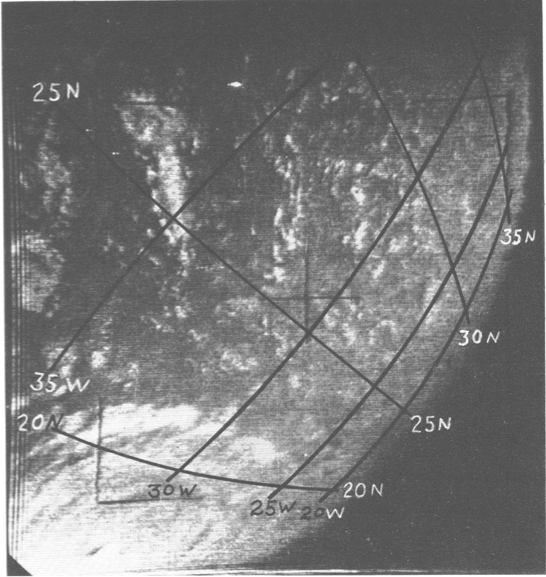
Hurricane Debbie by TIROS-3 (7 September 1961)

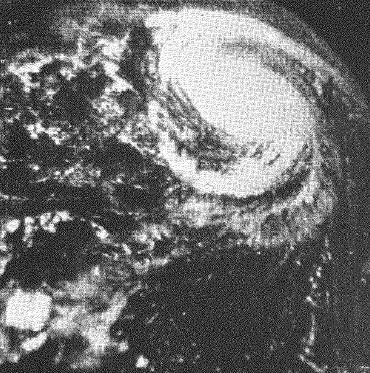
Hurricane Betsy by TIROS-3 (8 September 1961)

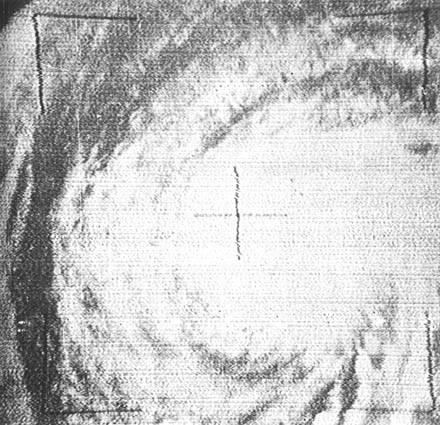
Hurricane Esther by TIROS-3 (10 September 1961)
