= TIROS-5 =

NASA weather satellite

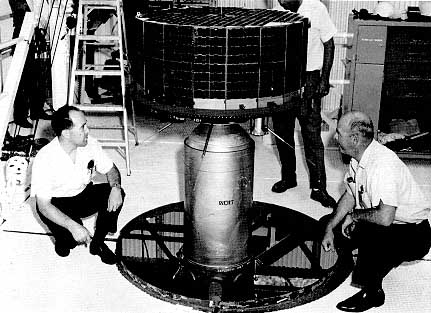
- TIROS 5 satellite during inspection.
- Mission type: Weather satellite
- Operator: NASA
- Harvard designation: 1962 αα1
- COSPAR ID: 1962-025A
- SATCAT no.: 309
- Mission duration: 11 months

Spacecraft properties
- Spacecraft type: TIROS
- Manufacturer: RCA Astro / GSFC
- Launch mass: 129.3 kilograms (285 lb)

Start of mission
- Launch date: June 19, 1962, 12:14 UTC
- Rocket: Thor-Delta
- Launch site: Cape Canaveral LC-17A

End of mission
- Last contact: May 14, 1963

Orbital parameters
- Reference system: Geocentric
- Regime: Low Earth
- Eccentricity: 0.02695
- Perigee altitude: 586 kilometers (364 mi)
- Apogee altitude: 972 kilometers (604 mi)
- Inclination: 58.08°
- Period: 100 minutes
- Epoch: June 19, 1962

Instruments
- Television Camera System

TIROS 5 (also called TIROS-E and A-50) was a spin-stabilized meteorological satellite. It was the fifth in a series of Television Infrared Observation Satellites.

== Launch ==
TIROS 5 was launched on June 19, 1962, by a Thor-Delta rocket from Cape Canaveral Air Force Station, Florida, United States. The spacecraft functioned nominally until June 30, 1962. The satellite orbited the Earth once every 1 hour and 30 minutes, at an inclination of 58°. Its perigee was 586 kilometers (364 mi) and apogee was 972 kilometers (604 mi).

== Mission ==
TIROS 5 was designed to further demonstrate the capability of a spacecraft to observe, record, and transmit TV cloud cover pictures for use in operational weather analysis and forecasting. The spin-stabilized satellite was in the form of an 18-sided right prism, 107 cm across opposite corners and 56 cm high, with a reinforced baseplate carrying most of the subsystems and a cover assembly. Electric energy was supplied to the spacecraft by approximately 9000 1- by 2-cm silicon solar cells mounted on the cover assembly and by 21 nickel-cadmium batteries.

A single monopole antenna for reception of ground commands extended from the top of the cover assembly. A pair of crossed-dipole telemetry antennas (235 MHz) projected down and diagonally out from the baseplate. The satellite spin rate was maintained between 8 and 12 rpm by the use of five diametrically opposed pairs of small solid-fuel thrusters mounted around the edge of the baseplate. Proper attitude was maintained to within a 1° to 2° accuracy by use of a magnetic control device consisting of 250 cores of wire wound around the outer surface of the spacecraft.

The interaction between the induced magnetic field in the spacecraft and the Earth's magnetic field provided the necessary torque for attitude control. TIROS-5 was equipped with two 1.27-cm vidicon TV cameras, one medium angle and one wide angle, for taking Earth cloudcover pictures. The pictures were transmitted directly to either of two ground receiving stations or were stored in a tape recorder on board for subsequent playback depending on whether the satellite was within or beyond the communication range of the station. The greater orbital inclination of TIROS 5 (58° vs 48° for previous TIROS spacecraft) extended the effective TV coverage from 65° N to 65° S lat.

With the exception of the failure of the medium-angle camera 17 days after launch, the satellite performed normally until May 14, 1963, when it was deactivated after the shutter electronics failed on the wide-angle camera.

== Gallery ==
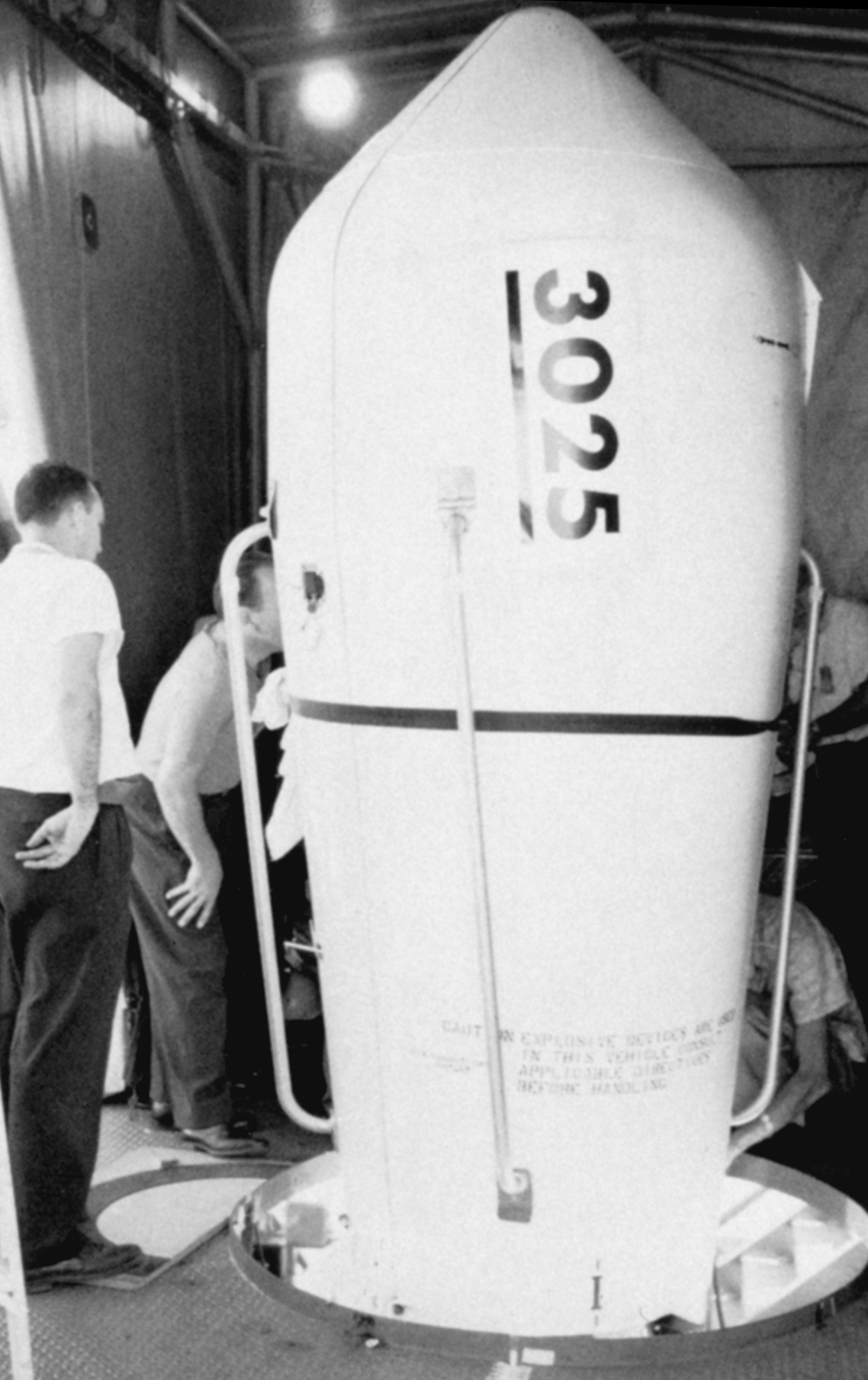
Securing cover for TIROS V satellite prior to launching

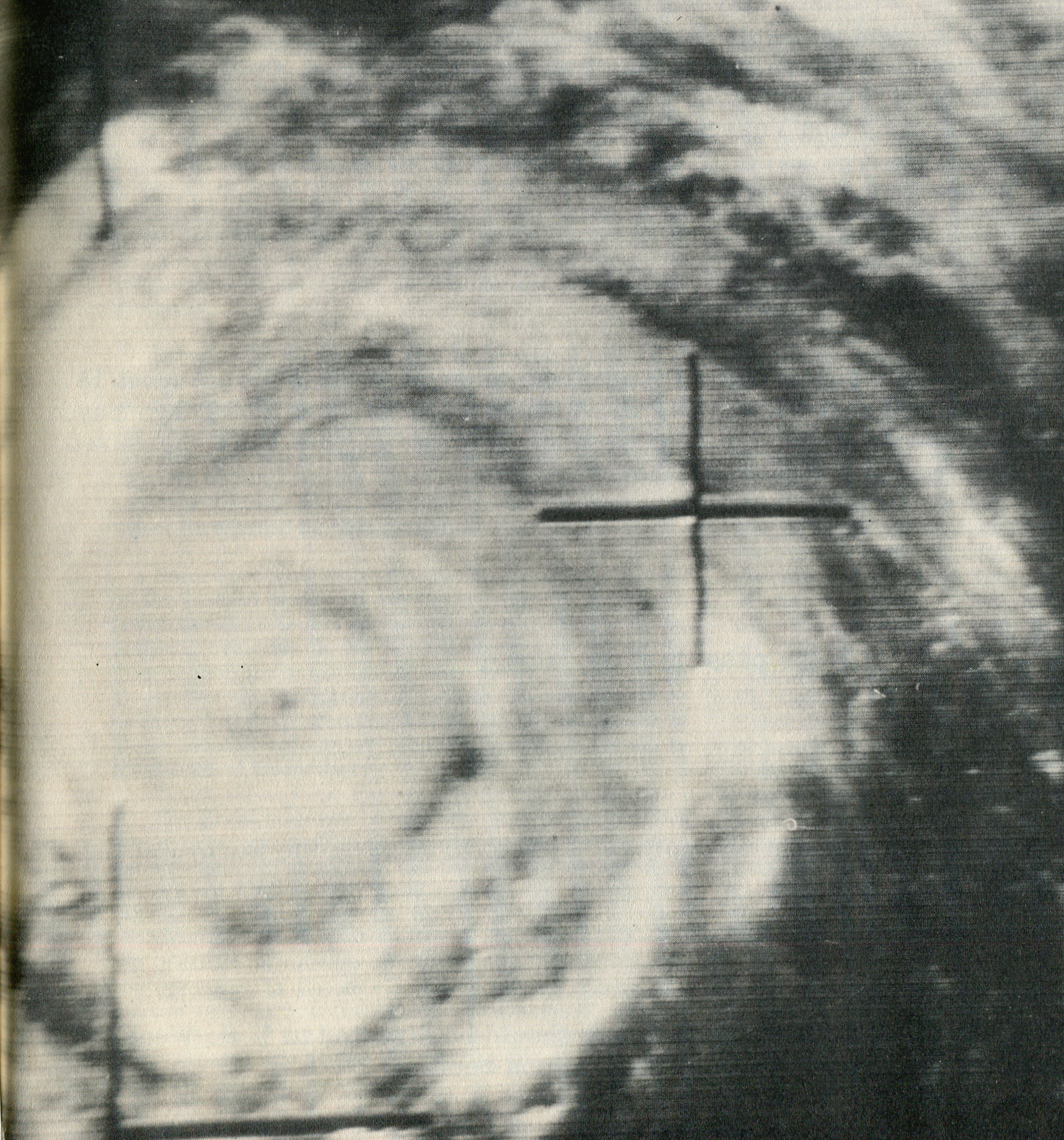
TIROS 5 image of Typhoon Ruth on August 18, 1962

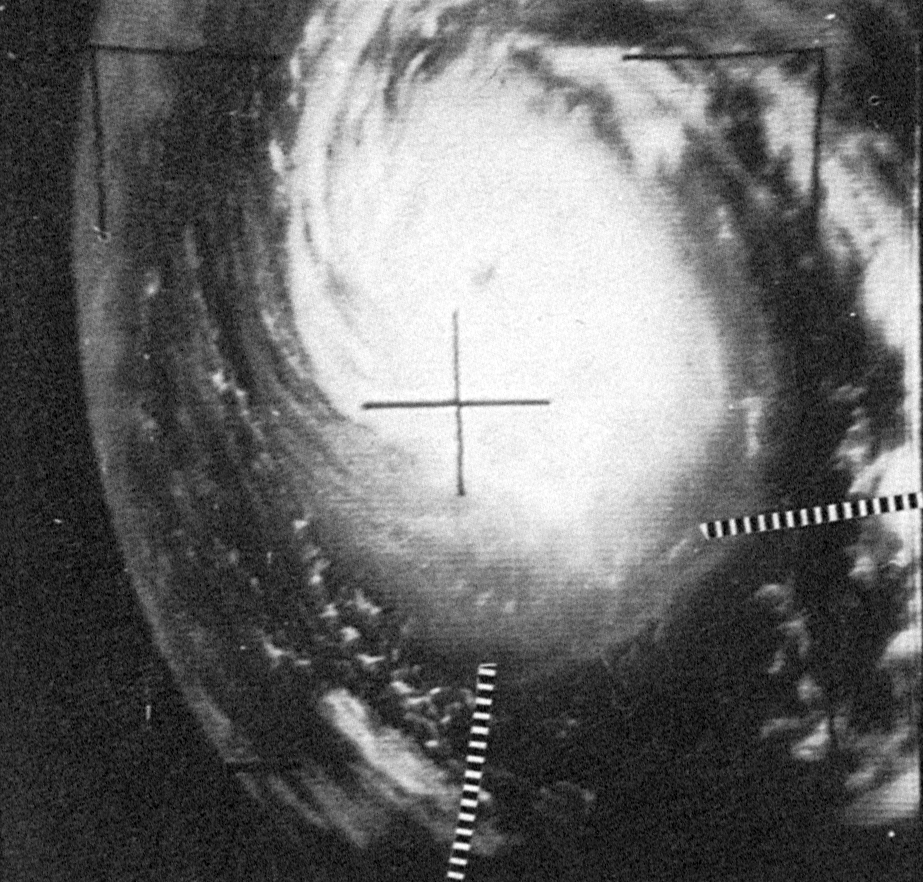
TIROS 5 image of Super Typhoon Amy on August 31, 1962

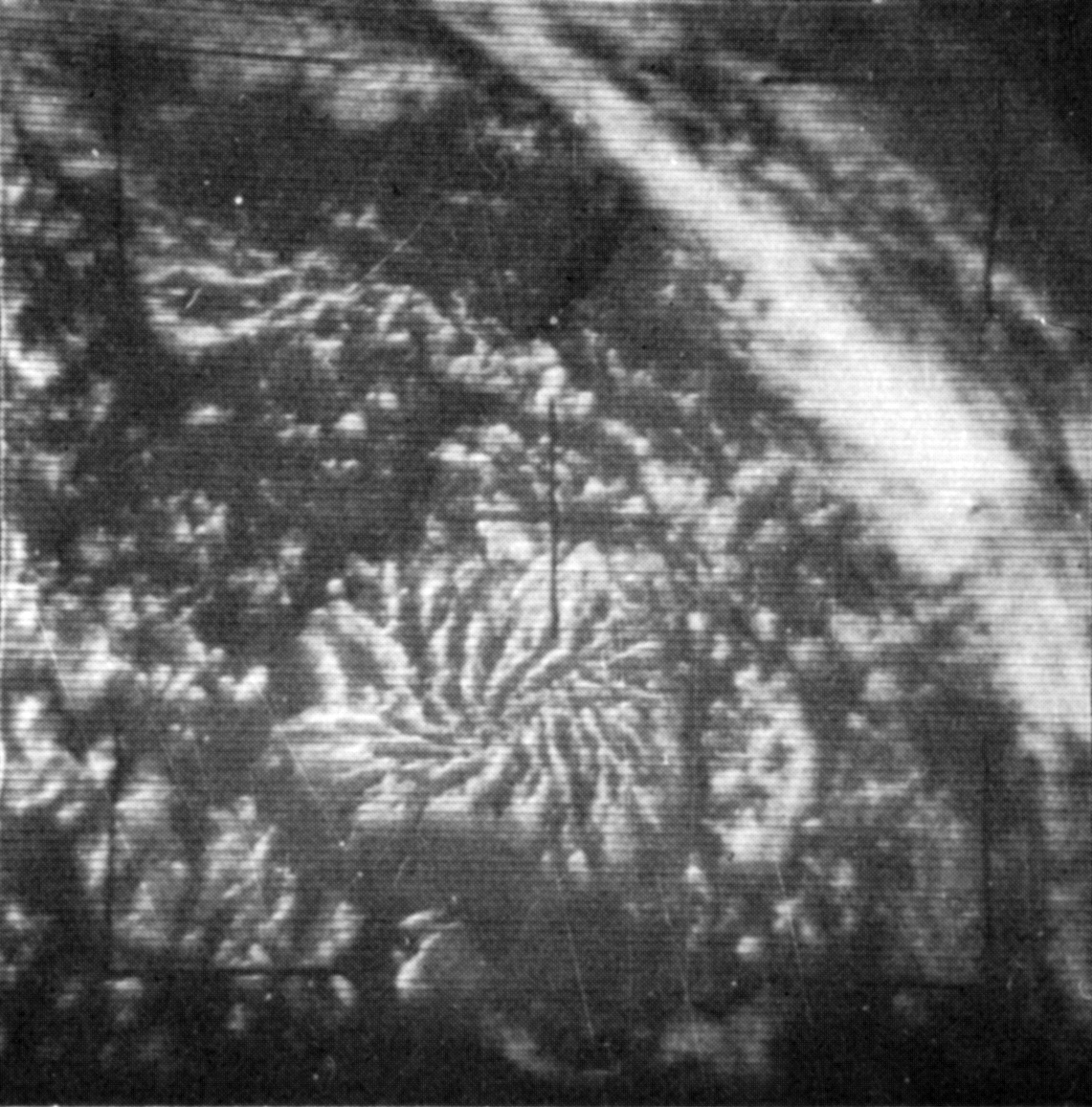
TIROS 5 image of Actinoform clouds over the Pacific, April 1965
