= Thor-Delta =

Expendable Rocket developed by USA during the Cold War to launch satellites

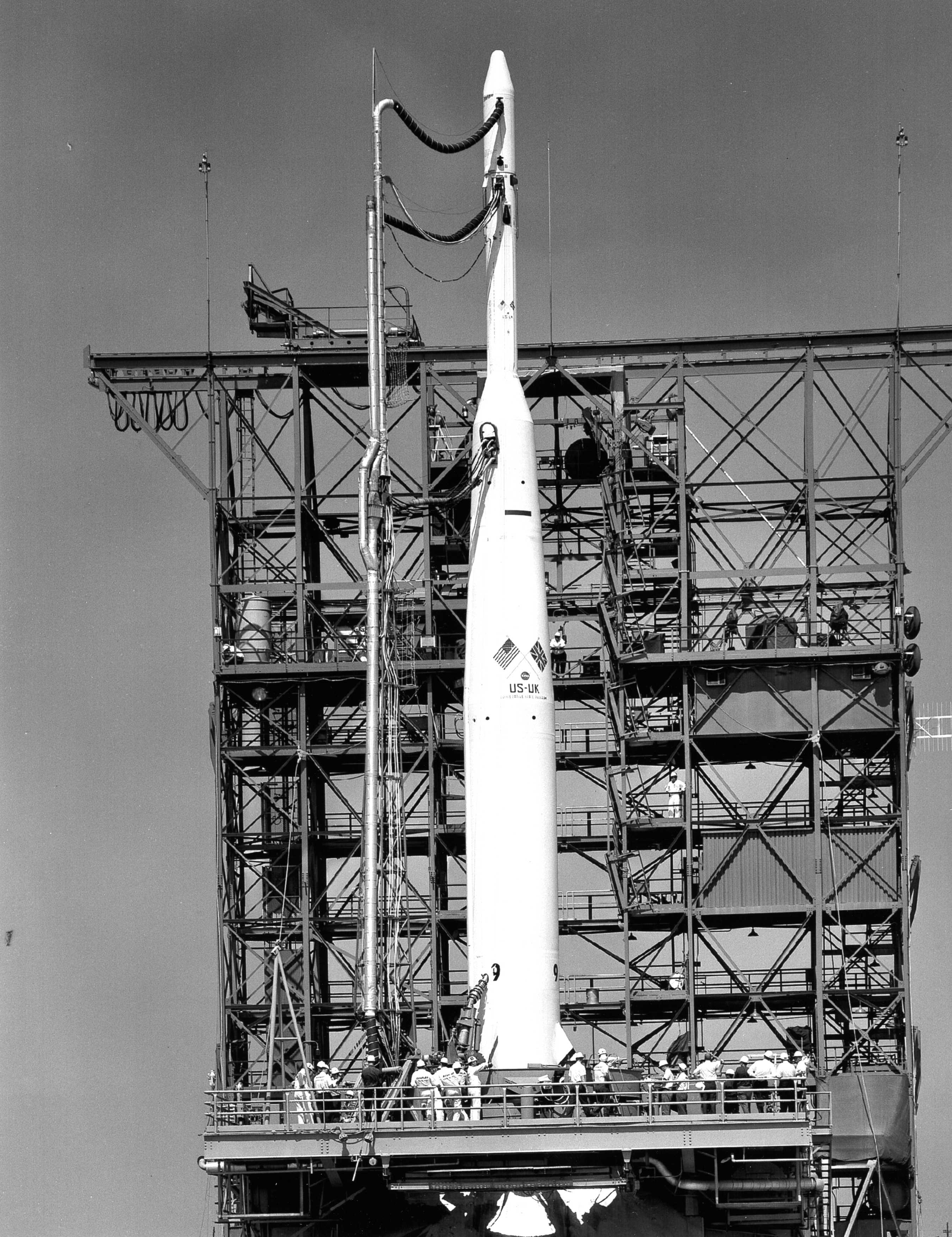
- Thor 320 Delta 9 rocket with UK first satellite Ariel 1, 26 April 1962
- Function: Expendable launch system
- Country of origin: United States

Capacity
- Payload to LEO: 270 kg

Launch history
- Status: Retired
- Launch sites: Cape Canaveral, LC-17
- Total launches: 12
- Success(es): 11
- Failure: 1
- First flight: 13 May 1960
- Last flight: 18 September 1962

First stage - Thor DM-19
- Engines: DM-18A / MB-3-I

Second stage Delta
- Engines: AJ-10-142

Third stage
- Engines: X-248A-7

The Thor-Delta, also known as Delta DM-19 or just Delta, was an early American expendable launch system used for 12 orbital launches in the early 1960s. A derivative of the Thor-Able, it was a member of the Thor family of rockets, and the first member of the Delta family.

The first stage was a Thor missile in the DM-19 configuration (DM-18A / MB-3-I engine). The second stage was the Delta (AJ-10-142 engine), which had been derived from the earlier Able stage. An Altair solid rocket motor (X-248A-7) was used as a third stage.

The basic design of the original Vanguard upper stages, featuring a pressure-fed nitric acid/UDMH, regeneratively cooled engine, was kept in place, but with an improved AJ10-118 engine. More significantly, the Delta stage featured cold gas attitude control jets allowing it to be stabilized in orbit for restart and more precise burns.

The Thor-Delta was the first rocket to use the combination of a Thor missile and a Delta upper stage. This configuration was reused for many later rockets, and a derivative, the Delta II, remained in service until 2018.

== Thor-Delta launches ==
The Thor-Delta launched a number of significant payloads, including the first communications satellite, Echo 1A; the first British satellite, Ariel 1; and the first active direct-relay communications satellite, Telstar 1. All 12 launches occurred from Cape Canaveral Air Force Station Launch Complex 17. The launch of Telstar 1 used pad B, while all other launches were from pad A. All launches were successful except the maiden flight, which failed to place Echo 1 into orbit due to a problem with the second stage.

=== Launch list ===
Date/time (UTC)	Rocket	S/N	Launch site	Payload	Function	Orbit	Outcome	Remarks
1960-05-13; 09:16:05	Thor DM-19 Delta	Thor 144; Delta 1	CCAFS LC-17A	Echo 1	Communication	MEO	Failure	Maiden flight of Thor-Delta, upper-stage attitude control system malfunctioned
1960-08-12; 09:39:43	Thor DM-19 Delta	Thor 270; Delta 2	CCAFS LC-17A	Echo 1A	Communications	MEO	Success	
1960-11-23; 11:13:03	Thor DM-19 Delta	Thor 245; Delta 3	CCAFS LC-17A	TIROS-2	Weather	SSO	Success	
1961-03-25; 15:17:04	Thor DM-19 Delta	Thor 295; Delta 4	CCAFS LC-17A	Explorer 10	Magnetospheric	HEO	Success	
1961-07-12; 10:25:06	Thor DM-19 Delta	Thor 286; Delta 5	CCAFS LC-17A	TIROS-3	Weather	SSO	Success	
1961-08-16; 03:21:05	Thor DM-19 Delta	Thor 312; Delta 6	CCAFS LC-17A	Explorer 12	Magnetospheric	HEO	Success	
1962-02-08; 12:43:45	Thor DM-19 Delta	Thor 317; Delta 7	CCAFS LC-17A	TIROS-4	Weather	SSO	Success	
1962-03-07; 16:06:18	Thor DM-19 Delta	Thor 301; Delta 8	CCAFS LC-17A	OSO-1	Solar	LEO	Success	
1962-04-26; 18:00:16	Thor DM-19 Delta	Thor 320; Delta 9	CCAFS LC-17A	Ariel 1	Ionospheric	LEO	Success	
1962-06-19; 12:19:01	Thor DM-19 Delta	Thor 321; Delta 10	CCAFS LC-17A	TIROS-5	Weather	SSO	Success	
1962-07-10; 08:35:05	Thor DM-19 Delta	Thor 316; Delta 11	CCAFS LC-17B	Telstar 1	Communication	MEO	Success	
1962-09-18; 08:53:08	Thor DM-19 Delta	Thor 318; Delta 12	CCAFS LC-17A	TIROS-6	Weather	SSO	Success	Final flight of Thor-Delta
