= TIROS-2 =

NASA weather satellite

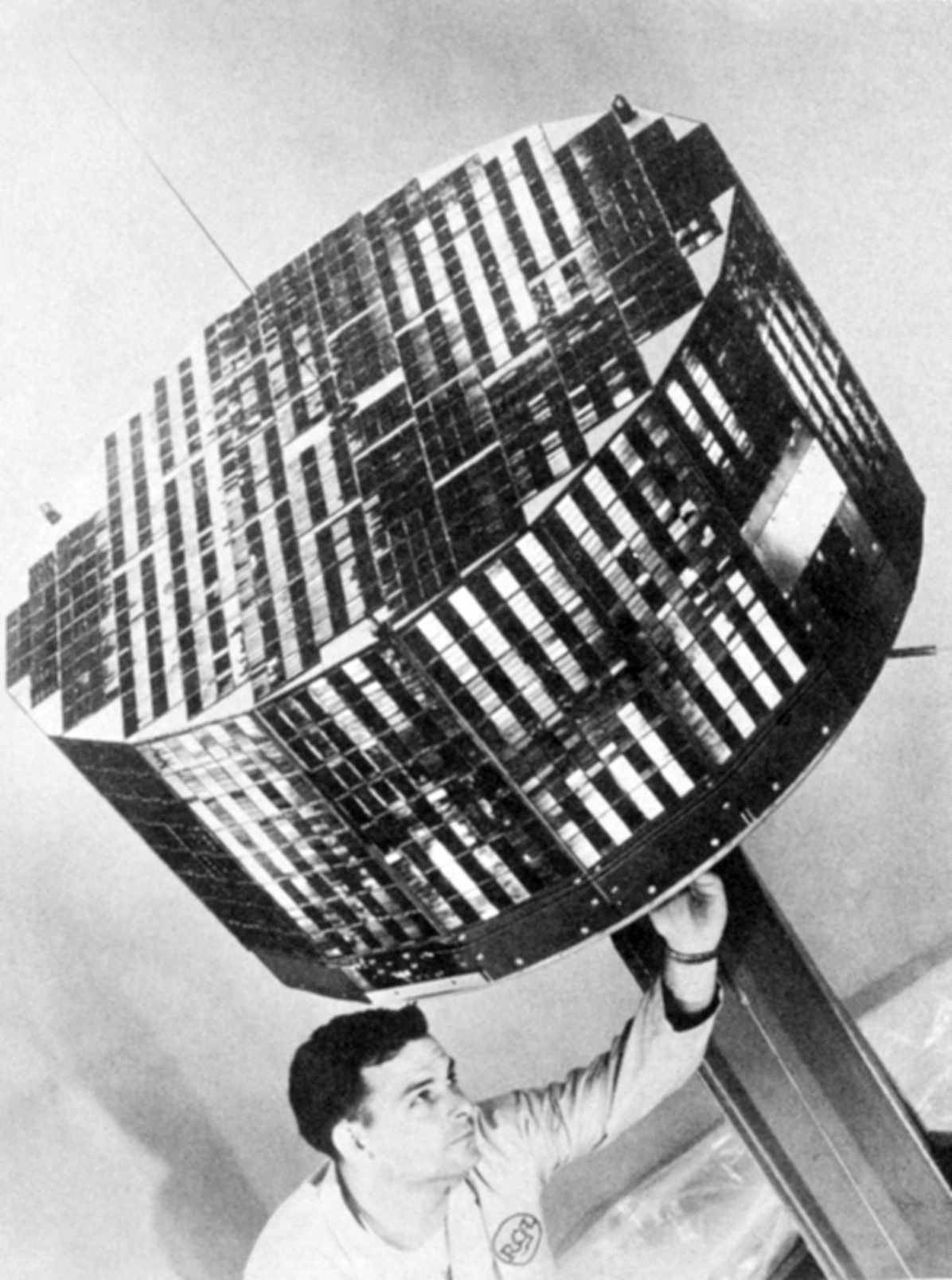
- TIROS-2 before launch
- Mission type: Weather satellite
- Operator: NASA
- Harvard designation: 1960 Pi 1
- COSPAR ID: 1960-016A
- SATCAT no.: 63
- Mission duration: 376 days

Spacecraft properties
- Spacecraft type: TIROS
- Manufacturer: RCA Astro; GSFC
- Launch mass: 127 kilograms (280 lb)

Start of mission
- Launch date: November 23, 1960, 11:13:03 UTC
- Rocket: Thor DM-19 Delta
- Launch site: Cape Canaveral LC-17A

End of mission
- Disposal: Natural re-entry
- Last contact: December 4, 1961
- Decay date: May 18, 2014

Orbital parameters
- Reference system: Geocentric
- Regime: Low Earth
- Semi-major axis: 6,755.43 kilometers (4,197.63 mi)
- Eccentricity: 0.0014596
- Perigee altitude: 374 kilometers (232 mi)
- Apogee altitude: 394 kilometers (245 mi)
- Inclination: 48.51 degrees
- Period: 92.09 minutes
- Epoch: December 8, 2013, 11:58:18 UTC

Instruments
- Widefield Radiometer; Scanning Radiometer; Television Camera System

TIROS-2 (or TIROS-B) was a spin-stabilized meteorological satellite. It was the second in a series of Television Infrared Observation Satellites. It re-entered on May 18, 2014.

== Spacecraft ==
TIROS-2 was an 18-sided right prism, 107 cm in diameter and 56 cm high, with 9,260 1 by 2 cm silicon solar cells covered the top and sides. Five small directly opposed pairs of solid-fuel thrusters maintained a spin of 8 to 12 rpm. For attitude control, the spacecraft used an infrared horizon sensor and a magnetic attitude control device, made of 250 cores of wire wound around the outer surface, which oriented the spin axis to a 1 to 2 degree accuracy. It also had a direction indicator for picture orientation.

The satellite had two independent television camera subsystems, one low-resolution and one high-resolution, for taking pictures of cloud cover. Each camera had a magnetic tape recorder for storing photographs while out of range of the ground station network. It also had a five-channel medium-resolution scanning radiometer and a two channel non-scanning low resolution radiometer for measuring radiation from the earth and atmosphere.

== Development ==
TIROS-2 was developed by a 44-year-old scientist named Dr. Morris Tepper, Chief Meteorological Satellite Program, NASA, and was affiliated with NASA's Goddard Space Flight Center. He also was born in Palestine in 1916. Morris Tepper would later come to The United States of America in 1922 and became a citizen in 1926. He would earn a professional membership which included The American Meteorological Society, The American Rocket Society, and eventually The Washington Academy of Science.

Morris Tepper was in the National Aeronautics and Space Administration. He would later become responsible for launching the satellite. During development, Dr. Tepper proposed the longer-term NASA Meteorological Satellite Program which included later TIROS satellites. This eventually included The Nimbus Program and the anticipated Aeros series. Due to this proposal by Dr. Tepper, NASA started to establish a program to support the work.

Morris Tepper worked alongside Mr. R. M. Rados who was a general contact and Dr. R. A. Stampfl, who was a project manager affiliated with NASA's Goddard Space Flight Center as well. Morris later retired from NASA and was formerly in Dep Dir, Earth Obs. Programs.

In 1959, NASA was temporarily housing its weather satellite group at the NRL known as TIROS. Marjorie Townsend was a part of the development for the ground equipment which was responsible for the infrared experiment.

At NASA, Marjorie Townsend's presence was often challenged due to one engineer calling her "stupid." But, she fought back and kept working out of desperation. Townsend later retired from NASA in 1980.

== Launch ==
TIROS-2 was launched on November 23, 1960, at 11:13:03 UTC, by a Thor-Delta rocket from Cape Canaveral, Florida. This was followed by the launch on November 11 which The Weather Bureau and NASA invited scientists from 21 nations to participate in the analysis of weather data gathered by TIROS II. With, the cooperation of the Department of Health, Education and Welfare, The Weather Bureau meteorologists issue first advisories on air pollution potential over the eastern United States.

The spacecraft functioned nominally until January 22, 1961, when components of the scanning radiometer started deteriorating. The satellite orbited the Earth once every 98 minutes, at an inclination of 48.5°. Its perigee was 609 kilometers (329 nmi) and apogee was 742 kilometers (401 nmi). On May 18, 2014, TIROS-2 naturally re-entered the atmosphere and vaporized before reaching the earth's surface.

== Instruments ==
TIROS 2 added two infrared radiometers to TIROS 1 instruments, which allowed more analysis of frontal zones.

== Gallery ==
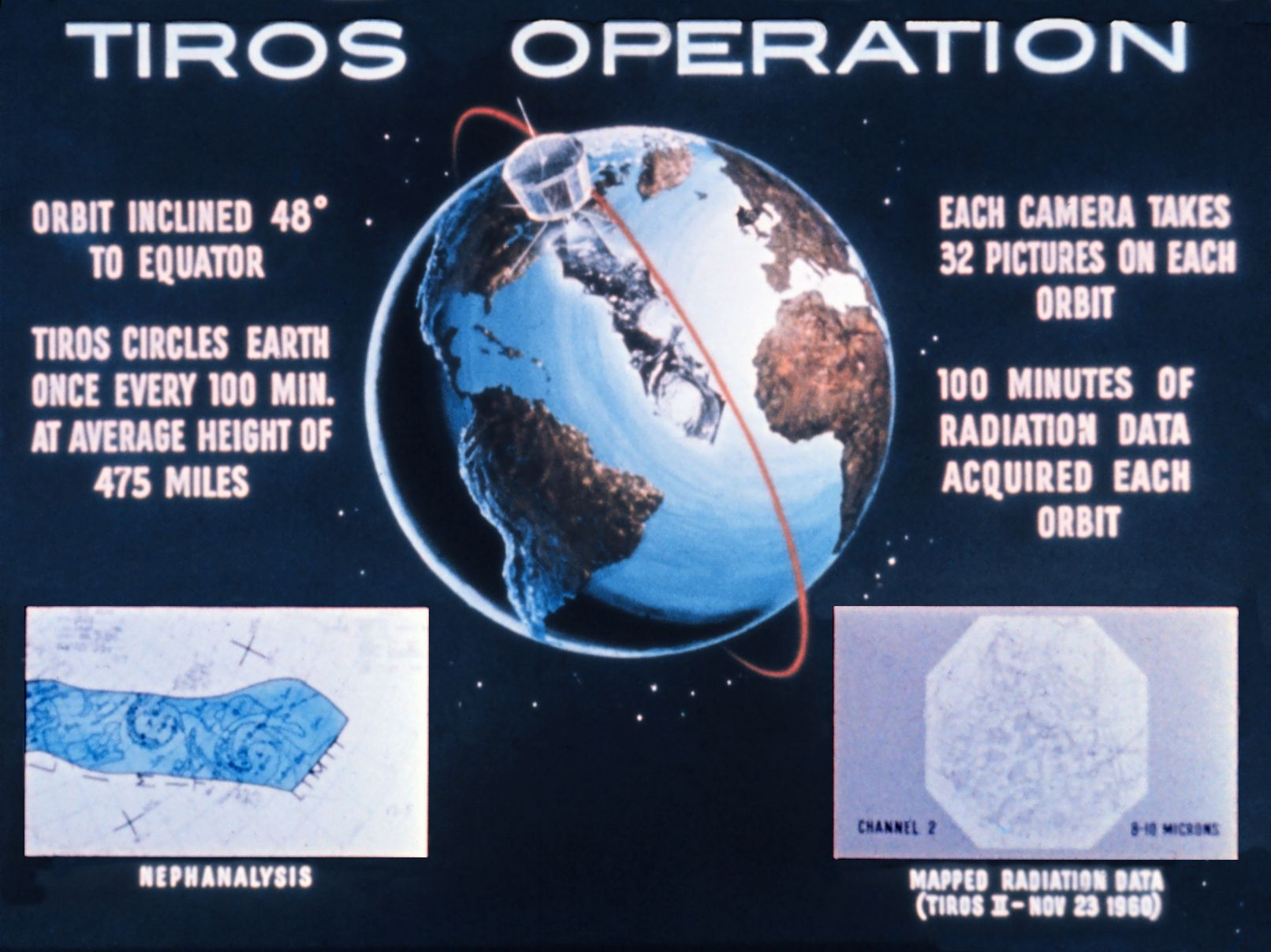
Graphic of TIROS-2 orbital path and examples of data products.

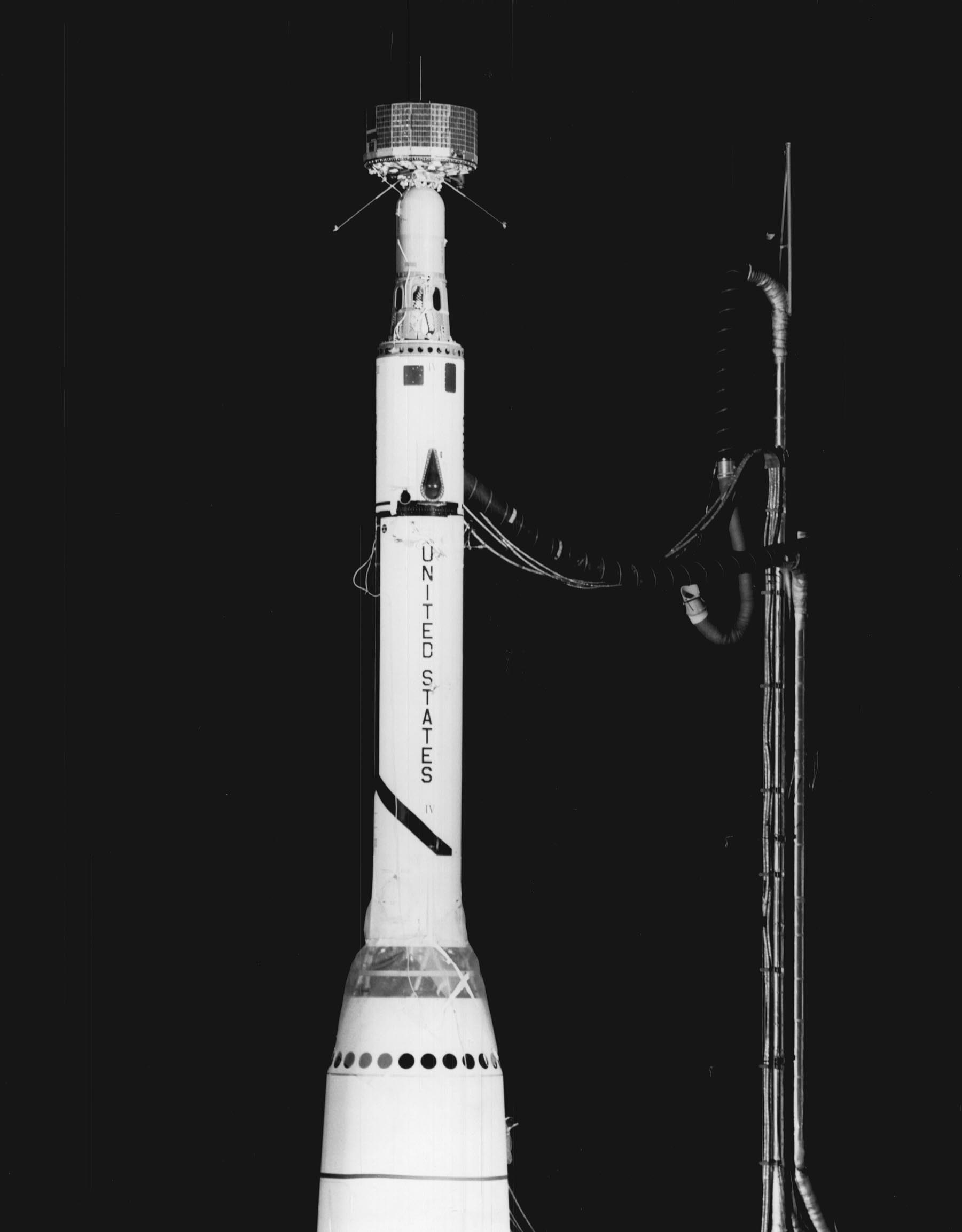
TIROS-2 satellite atop of a Delta rocket during a mock countdown on Pad 17A

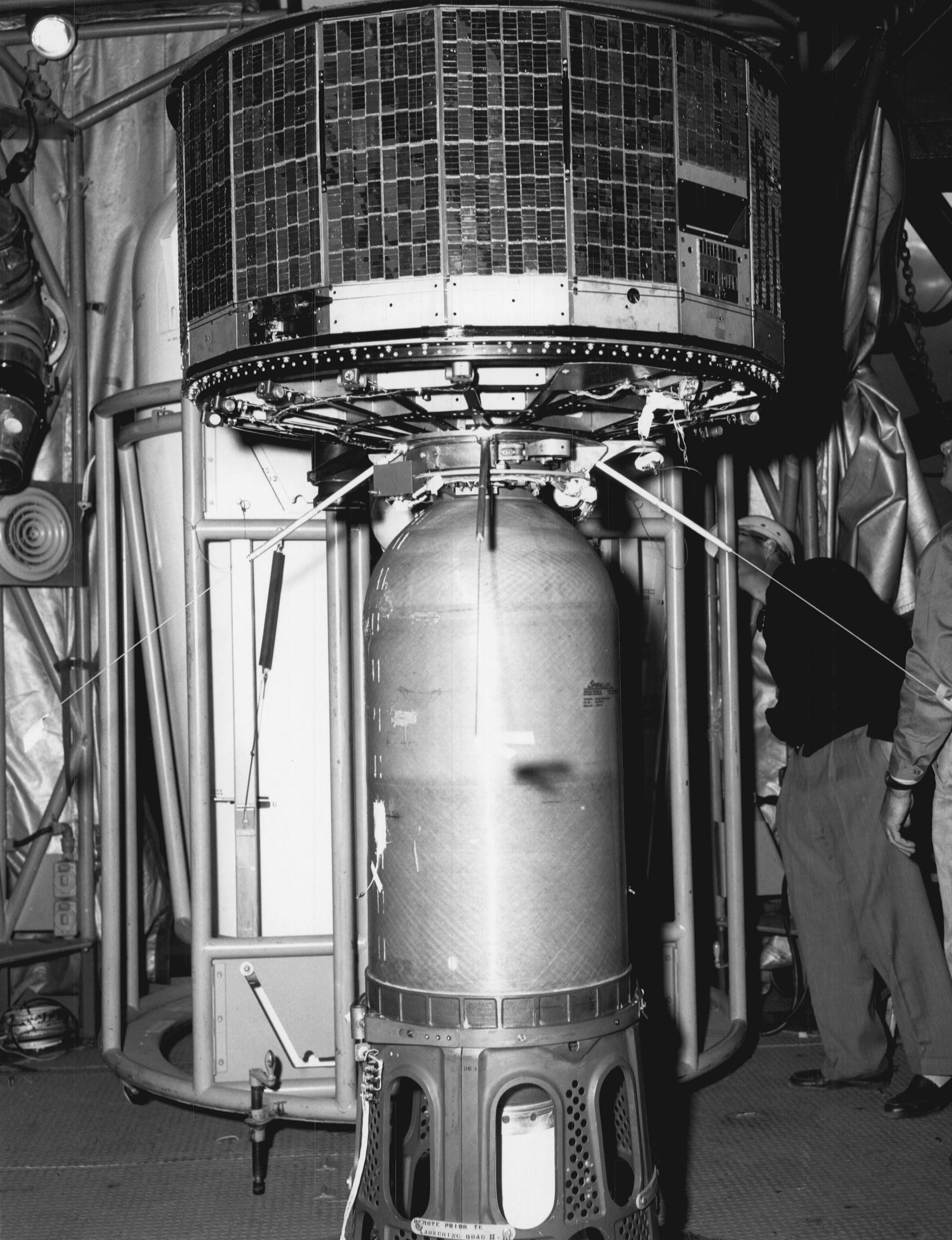
TIROS-2 satellite atop of launch vehicle, under hangar roof

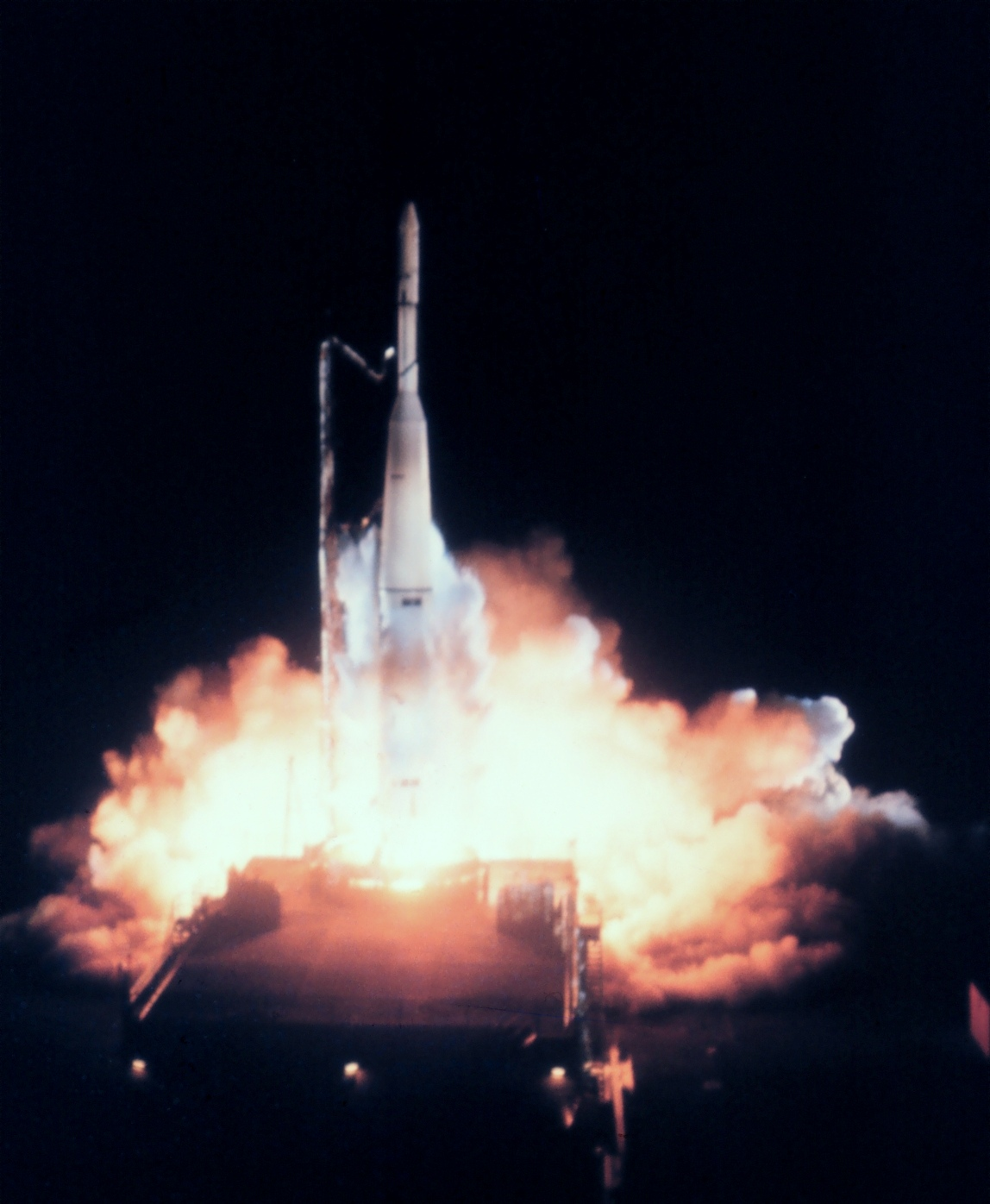
Launch of TIROS-2 on November 23, 1960

Universal Newsreel about the launching of the TIROS-2 satellite

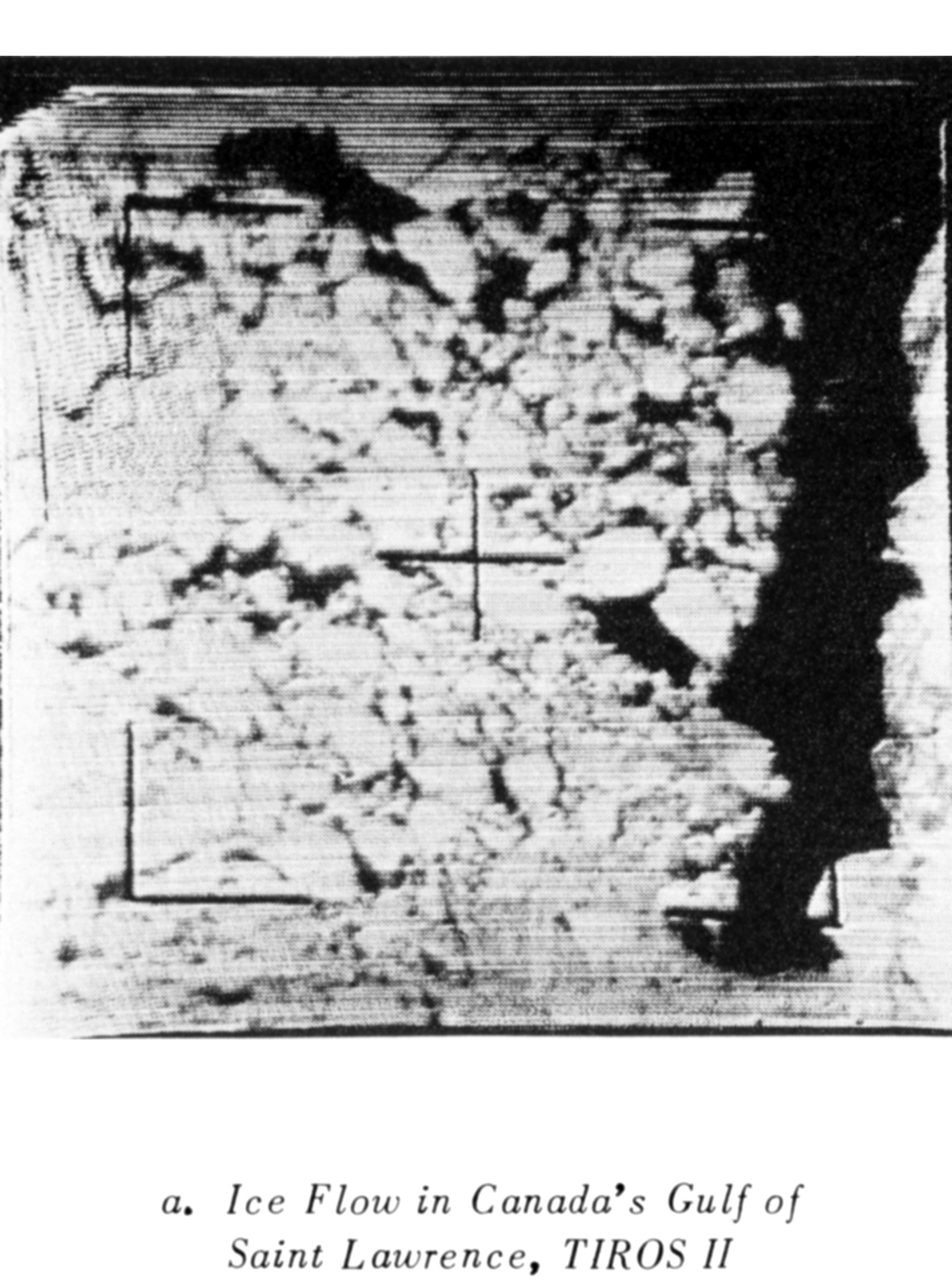
Ice floes as seen in Canada's Gulf of St. Lawrence by TIROS-2 in March 1961

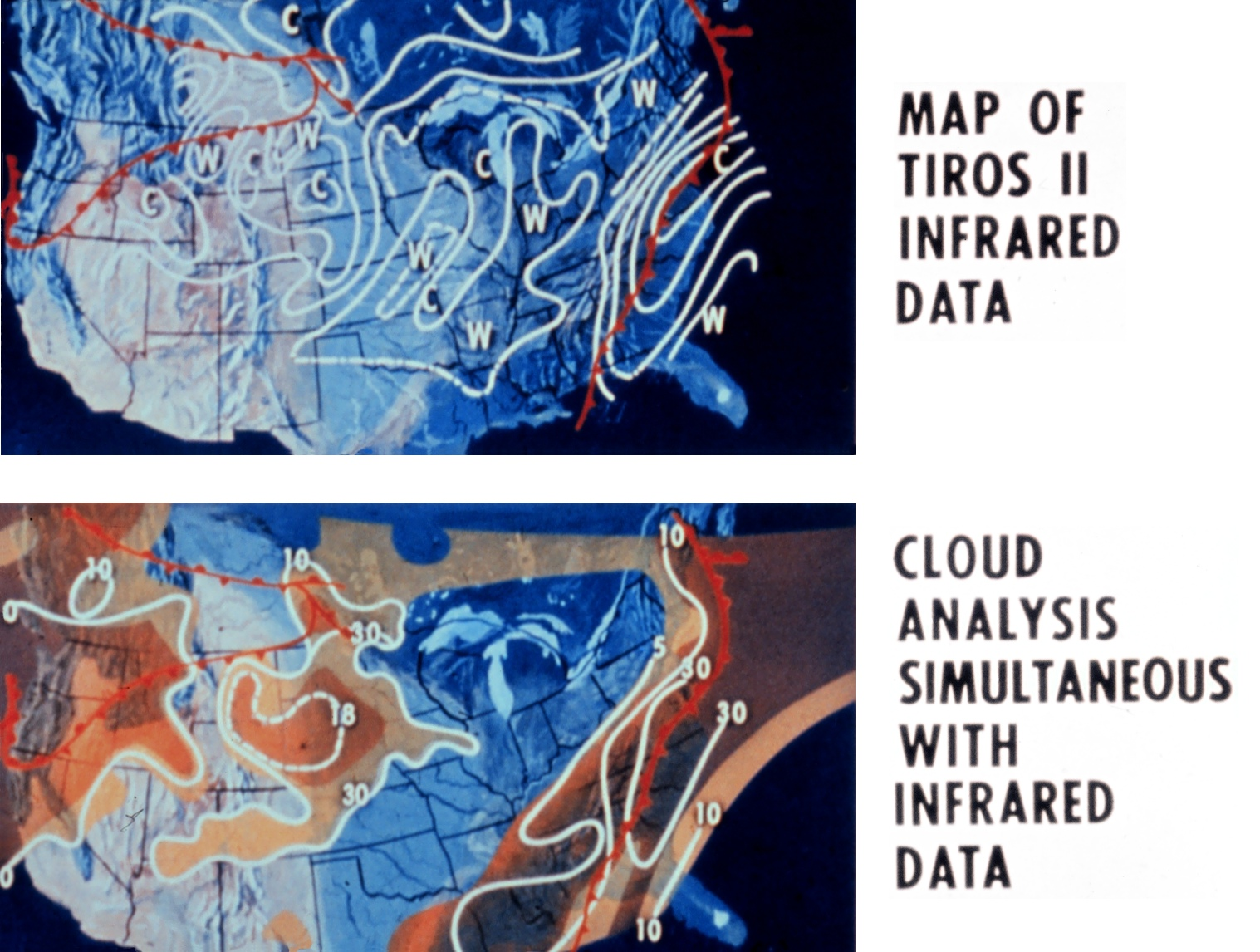
Map of TIROS II infrared imagery with accompanying cloud analysis
